= Music of the Lesser Antilles =

The music of the Lesser Antilles encompasses the music of this chain of small islands making up the eastern and southern portion of the West Indies. Lesser Antillean music is part of the broader category of Caribbean music; much of the folk and popular music is also a part of the Afro-American musical complex, being a mixture of African, European and indigenous American elements. The Lesser Antilles' musical cultures are largely based on the music of African slaves brought by European traders and colonizers. The African musical elements are a hybrid of instruments and styles from numerous West African tribes, while the European slaveholders added their own musics into the mix, as did immigrants from India. In many ways, the Lesser Antilles can be musically divided based on which nation colonized them.

The former British colonies include Trinidad and Tobago, whose calypso style is an especially potent part of the music of the other former British colonies, which also share traditions like the Big Drum dance. The French islands of Martinique and Guadeloupe share the popular zouk style and have also had extensive musical contact with the music of Haiti, itself once a French colony though not part of the Lesser Antilles. The former Dutch colonies of Curaçao, Bonaire and Aruba share the combined rhythm popular style. The islands also share a passion for kaseko, a genre of Surinamese music; Suriname and its neighbors Guyana and French Guiana share folk and popular styles that are connected enough to the Antilles and other Caribbean islands that both countries are studied in the broader context of Antillean or Caribbean music.

== Characteristics ==
While Lesser Antillean music is very often discussed as a music area, this division is of limited usefulness. The islands of the Lesser Antilles divide musically along linguistic lines, with the most significant overlap coming from Dominica and Saint Lucia, both primarily Anglophone but strongly influenced by a French colonial past. Because the islands are divided linguistically, the term Antillean music is usually used in reference to one such music area. Thus, for example, the Rough Guide to World Music features a chapter on "Antillean music", which is entirely about the French Antillean islands of Martinique and Guadeloupe, with a brief sidebar specifically about the Dutch Antilles.

In the context of Anglophone music, the term Antillean music most commonly refers to Trinidad and Tobago, home to the well-known calypso style. Music author Peter Manuel, for example, treats all the Anglophone islands as a subject of Trinidadian calypso traditions, while using the title Music of the Lesser Antilles for Francophone Antillean music. Manuel also, like many authors, treats Suriname and Guyana as integral aspects of Caribbean music; due to the Dutch colonial history of both countries, they are often grouped with Aruba and the Netherlands Antilles.

Nevertheless, Antillean music can be characterized by the prominence of the Carnival celebration (prominently from Trinidad and Tobago), and the importance of calypso-like song traditions. The Lesser Antilles is also home to a strong Indo-Caribbean population; though Indo-Caribbean music is found elsewhere in the Caribbean, the prominence of Indian-influenced styles is a hallmark of the Antillean music scenes. Regional forms can also be found outside of the Caribbean entirely, most notably in New York City, where Brooklyn's Labor Day Carnival features music and parades, mas and steel bands; this Carnival is distinct to New York, and reflects elements of a pan-Caribbean nature.

=== Calypso and calypso-like traditions ===
Calypso is most closely associated with the island of Trinidad, but it has spread throughout the Lesser Antilles, and abroad. Similar traditions can be found natively on many of Caribbean islands. Within the Antilles, most of the popular calypso stars have come from Trinidad and Tobago; the majority of the exceptions, such as Arrow from Montserrat, have come from other Anglophone islands. Music author Peter Manuel has argued that, despite the modern Anglophone focus to calypso-like song forms, their origins lie in the "Afro-French creole culture", and notes that the ancestor of the word calypso, cariso, was first used to refer to a Martinican singer.

The calypso song complex is characterized by satirical, political, risque and humorous lyricism, a competitive and celebratory nature and its function in social organization and informal communication. Jamaican mento is perhaps the best-known form of calypso-like music. The island of Carriacou is home to a calypso-like song style, as well as canboulay feasts, calinda songs, and steel bands, all similar to the related Trinidadian traditions, though distinct from them. Modern influences from Trinidad have organized the Carriacou song style, and there are competitions similar to calypso tents on the island. The Antiguan benna is part of the same song complex, featuring news-oriented and ribald, often satirical lyrics and a rhythmic, uptempo style.

=== Carnival ===
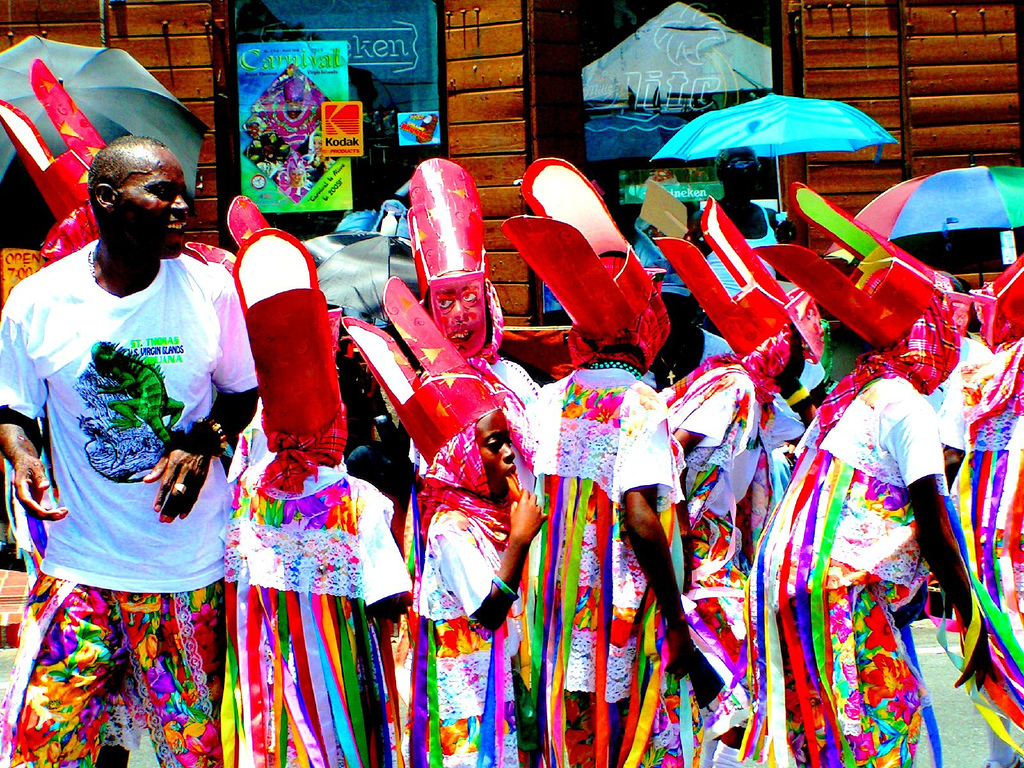
A Carnival troupe in the Virgin Islands

Annual Carnival celebrations are an important part of the culture of all the Lesser Antillean islands. Carnival is celebrated at varying times of year, either pre-Lent, Christmastime or in July and August, and feature a wide variety of dances, songs and parades. Contests are common, especially Calypso King and Queen contests, which are held on most of the British Antillean islands, the U.S. Virgin Islands as well as French Saint Martin and elsewhere. The British Antillean Carnivals are also mostly united by the J'ouvert tradition, which involves calypso and soca band parades and are the highlight of their celebrations.

Summer Carnivals include those on Antigua, Saint Vincent and the Grenadines, Sint Eustatius, Saint John, Saint Lucia, Grenada, Saba, Nevis and Anguilla, the latter two of which are especially known for popular calypso competitions. Christmastime Carnivals are held on Montserrat, Saint Croix, Saint Martin and Saint Kitts; Montserrat's distinctive Carnival includes masquerades and steelbands, and both islands also feature calypso competitions. The Carnival of Sint Maarten, which takes place a month after Easter, is known for the burning of King Moui-Moui as the culmination of the festival. Many islands, especially the French and Dutch Antilles, are home to pre-Lenten Carnivals, including Martinique, Aruba, Saint-Barthélemy, Bonaire, Curaçao, Dominica, Saint Thomas and Guadeloupe.

== British Antilles ==
There are many popular traditions common to the English-speaking islands of the Lesser Antilles. Calypso, originally an old folk music–based genre from West Africa, is popular throughout the islands; other popular traditions, like soca originally from Trinidad, are also well known throughout the region. Steel drum ensembles is also found throughout the English-speaking Lesser Antilles (and abroad), especially in Trinidad and Tobago as well as Antigua and Barbuda. The British Antilles also share in certain folk traditions. Eastern Caribbean folk calypso is found throughout the area, as are African-Caribbean religious music styles like the Shango music of Trinidad. Variants of the Big Drum festival occur throughout the Windward Islands, especially in Saint Vincent and the Grenadines. Carnival is an important folk music celebration on all the islands of the Lesser Antilles, and the rest of the Caribbean.

Calypso is part of a spectrum of similar folk and popular Caribbean styles that spans benna and mento, but remains the most prominent genre of Lesser Antillean music. Calypso's roots are somewhat unclear, but we know it can be traced to 18th-century Trinidad and other Caribbean islands like Saint Lucia. Modern calypso, however, began in the 19th century, a fusion of disparate elements ranging from the masquerade song lavway, French Creole belair and the stick fighting chantwell. Calypso's early rise was closely connected with the adoption of Carnival by Trinidadian slaves, including camboulay drumming and the music masquerade processions. Popular calypso arose in the early 20th century, with the rise of internationally known calypsonians like Attila the Hun and Roaring Lion. calypso remained popular throughout the Caribbean in the later 20th century, the islands began producing calypso stars. In the 1970s, a calypso variant called soca arose, characterized by a focus on dance rhythms rather than lyricism. Soca has since spread across the Caribbean and abroad.

The Mongoose Play, a popular Kittitian production of folk theatre and music

Steel drums are a distinctively Trinidadian ensemble that evolved from improvised percussion instruments used in Carnival processions. By the late 1930s, bamboo tubes, a traditional instrumental, were supplemented by pieces of metal used percussively; over time, these metal percussion instruments were pitched to produce as many as twenty-some tones. Steel bands were large orchestras of these drums, and were banned by the British colonial authorities. Nevertheless, steel drums spread across the Caribbean, and are now an entrenched part of the culture of Trinidad and Tobago.

Though Trinidadian popular music is by far the most well-known style of Lesser Antillean music, the other Anglophone islands are home to their own musical traditions. Carriacou and Grenada are home to Carnival celebrations that feature distinct form of calypso, canboulay feasts, calinda stick-fighting songs and the steelband accompanied jouvert, as well as the Big Drum dance, which is also found in Saint Vincent and the Grenadines. Grenada and Saint Vincent and the Grenadines share other musics as well including the funereal music of the saraca rite, a call-and-response form with both European and African lyrics.

== French Antilles ==
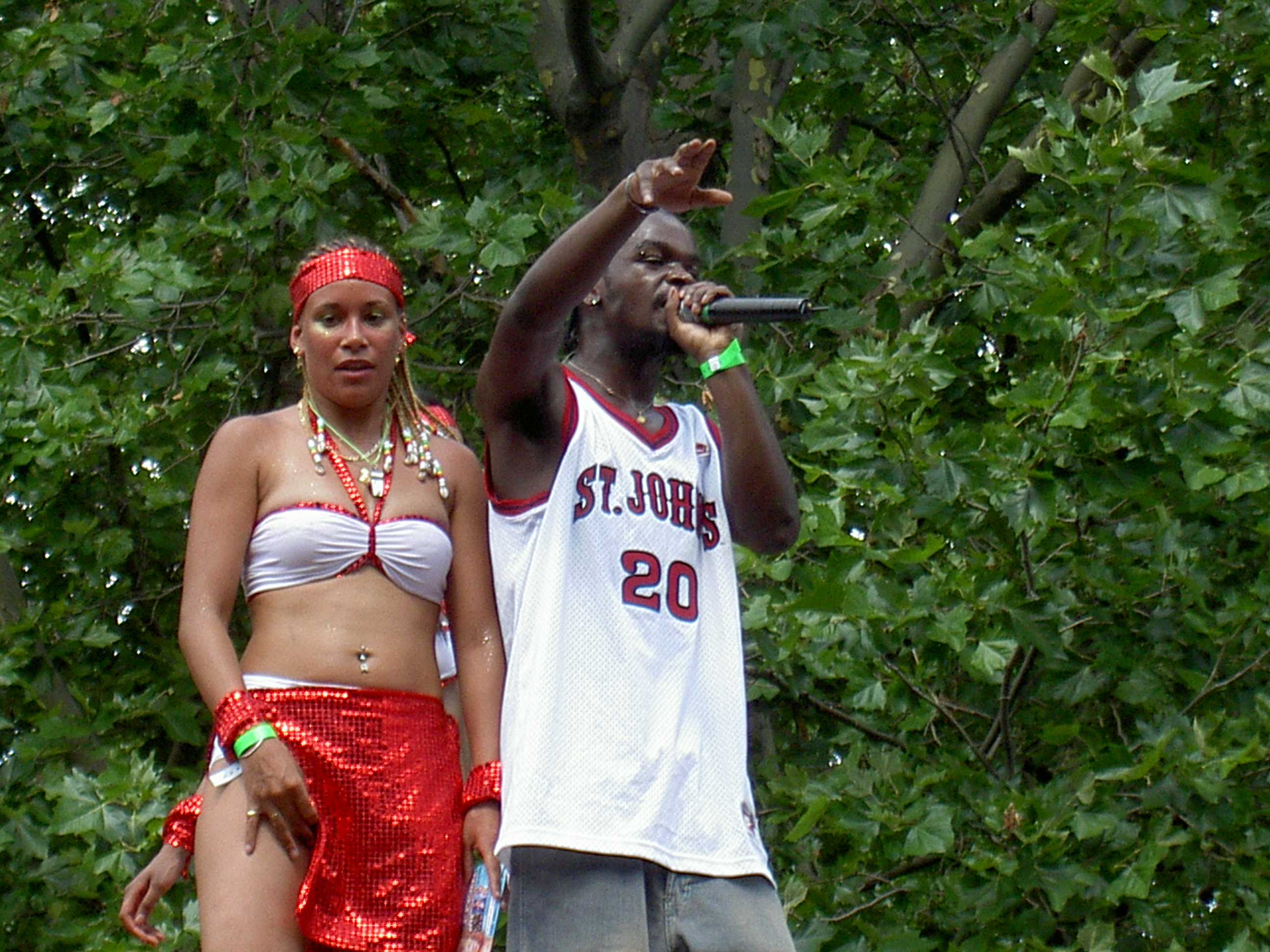
French Antillean Carnival in Paris

French Creole music is most famously associated with Martinique and Guadeloupe, though the islands of Saint Lucia and Dominica are also home to French Antillean music. Creole music is characterized by the prominence of the quadrille dance, distinct from the French version and related to the Haitian mereng. The quadrille is a potent symbol of French Antillean culture.

Martinique and Guadeloupe are also home to their own distinct folk traditions, most influentially including Guadeloupan gwo ka and Martinican tambour and tibwa. Gwo ka is a type of percussion music which consists of seven basic rhythms and variations on them. It has been modernized into gwo ka moderne, though traditional rural performances (lewoz) are still common. Tambour and ti bwa ensembles are the origin of several important Martinican popular styles, including chouval bwa and biguine, and also exerted an influence on zouk. Lucian folk music features ensembles of fiddle, cuatro, banjo, guitar and chak-chak (a rattle), with the banjo and cuatro being of iconic importance, and recreational, often lyric song forms called jwé. The French Creole folk music of Dominica is based on the quadrille, accompanied by ensembles called jing ping. Folk storytelling (kont) and songs (bélé) are also a major part of the country's musical identity.

=== Cadence-lypso ===
Cadence-lypso is the Dominican kadans of the 1970s. The leading figure in the promotion of the Cadence-lypso was the Dominican group Exile One (based on the island of Guadeloupe) and Grammacks that featured the Haitian Cadence rampa or compas with the Trinidadian calypso, hence the name cadence-lypso; however, most of the bands repertoire was kadans.

This fusion of kadans and calypso accounts only for a small percentage of the band's repertoire: Exile One like all Dominica kadans bands featured reggae, calypso and mostly kadans or compas music.

The Dominican kadans has evolved under the influence of Dominican and Caribbean/Latin rhythms, as well as rock guitars, soul-style vocals and funk bass and horn styles - music from the United States. By the end of the 1970s, Gordon Henderson defined Cadence-lypso as "a synthesis of Caribbean and African musical patterns fusing the traditional with the contemporary". It was pushed in the 1970s by groups from Dominica, and was the first style of Dominican music to find international acclaim.

Exile One, based in Guadeloupe, is a leading Dominican kadans group of the 1970s that was very influential in the development of caribbean music. The full-horn section kadans band Exile One led by Gordon Henderson was the first to introduce the newly arrived synthesizers to their music that other young cadence or compas bands from Dominica, Haiti (mini-jazz) and the French Antilles emulated in the 1970s.

=== Zouk ===
The inspiration for Zouk's style of rhythmic music comes from the Haitian compas, as well as music called cadence-lypso - Dominica cadence popularized by Grammacks and Exile One. Elements of gwo ka, tambour, ti bwa and biguine vidé are prominent in zouk. Though there are many diverse styles of zouk, some commonalities exist. The French Creole tongue of Martinique and Guadeloupe is an important element, and are a distinctive part of the music. Generally, zouk emphasises star singers, with little attention given to instrumentalists, and performances consist almost entirely of studio recordings.

Ethnomusicologist Jocelyn Guilbault believes zouk's evolution was influenced by other Caribbean styles especially Dominica cadence-lypso, Haitian cadence and Guadeloupean biguine. Zouk arose in the late 1970s and early 1980s, using elements of previous styles of antillean music, as well as importing other genres.

The band Kassav' remain the best known zouk group. Kassav' drew in influences from balakadri and bal granmoun dances, biguine's and mazurka's, along with more contemporary Caribbean influences like compas, reggae and salsa music. Zouk live shows soon began to draw on American and European rock and heavy metal traditions, and the genre spread across the world, primarily in developing countries.

Zouk has diversified into multiple subgenres. These include zouk-love, pop ballads by artists like Edith Lefel and Gilles Floro, Zouk-R&B, and ragga-zouk bands like Lord Kossity who fused the genre with other influences.

=== Zouk-love ===
Zouk Love is the French Antilles cadence or compas, characterized by a slow, soft and sexual rhythm. The lyrics of the songs often speak of love and sentimental problems.

The music kizomba from Angola and cabo-love from Cape Verde are also derivatives of this French Antillean compas music style, which sounds basically the same, although there are notable differences once you become more familiar with these genres. A main exponent of this subgenre is Ophelia Marie. Other Zouk Love artists come from the French West Indies, the Netherlands, and Africa.

Popular artists include French West Indian artists Edith Lefel and Nichols, or like Netherlands based Suzanna Lubrano and Gil Semedo, the African artist Kaysha.

=== Bouyon ===
Bouyon (Boo-Yon) is a form of popular music of Dominica, also known as jump up music in Guadeloupe and Martinique. The best-known band in the genre is Windward Caribbean Kulture (WCK), who originated the style in 1988 by experimenting elements of kadans (or cadence-lypso), lapo kabwit drumming, the folk style jing-ping, and a quick-paced electronic drum pattern. From a language perspective, Bouyon draws on English and Dominican Creole French. More recently, deejays with raggamuffin-style vocals (bouyon-muffin) have moved to the fore, updating the sound for the New Generation.

Due to the popularity of Triple K International, Ncore, and the New generation of bouyon bands who toured the French Antilles, a popular offshoot of bouyon from Guadeloupe is called bouyon gwada. The jump up had its heyday from the 90s with songs such as Met Veye WCK, but remained stamped background music or carnival. Over the years, thanks to inter-trade with the Dominicans and the mass participation of Guadeloupe at the World Creole Music Festival, the flagship group as Triple kay and MFR band began to democratize and local artists were inducted including the remix Allo Triple kay with Daly and "Big Ting Poppin 'Daly alone.

A popular offshoot within the bouyon gwada is called bouyon hardcore, a style characterized by its lewd and violent lyrics. Popular Bouyon gwada musicians include, Wee Low, Suppa, Doc J, Yellow gaza, etc.

=== Popular folk music ===
Though zouk is the most well-known form of modern French Antillean music, the island of Martinique has also produced the chouval bwa and biguine styles, which were especially popular in the early 20th century. Chouval bwa is includes multiple distinctive instruments and internationally famous performers like Claude Germany, Dede Saint-Prix, Pakatak and Tumpak, while biguine has achieved international fame since the 1920s and has since been modernized and adapted for pop audiences, making it a major influence on zouk. Between the 1930s and 1950s, the dance biguine was popular among the islands' dance orchestras. The biguine uses a cinquillo variant related to that found in other Caribbean genres like méringue and Compas. In the 1940s and 1950s, these dance bands absorbed influences from Cuban, American and Haitian popular music.

== Dutch Antilles ==
The islands of Curaçao, Bonaire, Aruba, Sint Eustatius and Saint Martin share musical styles, as well as maintain their own sets of folk and popular dances, ranging from the impromptu Statian road block to calypso, zouk and soca. African, indigenous and European ancestry predominate, though more recent immigrants have brought musical styles from Lebanon, China and India. In popular music, the islands are known for the Combined Rhythm, like local favorites the Happy Peanuts and Expresando Rimto i Ambiente. Kaseko music from the mainland country Suriname is also popular. Traditional music of Aruba and the Netherlands Antilles, however, is primarily African, characterized by the use of complex, highly developed polyrhythms, dance styles and drums like the tambú. Other African-derived instruments include metal percussion rods, agan, the rasp wiri, aerophones like the cachu trumpet, becu transverse double-reed wind instrument, and the bow benta.

The tambu is an instrument, and a form of music and dance found on Aruba, Bonaire (where it is sometimes known as bari), and Curaçao. The tambu is an especially important symbol of Curaçaoan identity. Instrumentation for the tambu uses the agan, chapi, triangle, wiri and other instruments, many of which are also part of the African-derived muziek di zumbi, or spirit music, of Curaçao. Curaçao's folk music also includes a rich tradition of work songs with apentatonic lyrics sung in Guene or a Papiamento variant called seshi. The Simadan harvest festival is found across the islands, and features the cachu trumpet, made from a cowhorn. Bonaire's Simadan festival is also notable for the use of the becu, an aerophone made from the stalk of a sorghum plant, and the kinkon, made from a conch shell and known elsewhere as the carco. Folk song forms range from the harvest seu, simadan and wapa. Other songs were imported beginning in the 19th century, including the South American joropo and pasillo, Spanish Caribbean merengue and other new songs, dances and instruments. This diverse mixture was the origin of the Dutch Antilles' most distinctive and long-standing popular tradition, the tumba.

The smaller islands of Saint Martin, Saba and Sint Eustatius largely share in the same folk instruments, dances and songs as their neighbors; however, these islands remain largely unstudied. Saba is home to a vital percussive music tradition, most closely associated with private parties, using instrumentation similar to Curaçao, Bonaire and Aruba. Saint Martin is home to a national dance form called the ponum, which dates to the 19th century and was only displaced by string bands in the mid-20th century. Saint Martin is also home to a calypso-like quimbe song form, that remains a major part of the island's culture.

== Indo-Antillean ==
Indo-Caribbean people in the Lesser Antillean music area are clustered in Guyana, Suriname, and Trinidad and Tobago. Indo-Caribbean folk traditions include the chowtal songs from the springtime festival phagwa, and Hindi bhajans which are still sung at temples despite there being few people who understand Hindi. Guyanese and Trinidadian Indo-Caribbeans developed a tradition that fused elements of calypso with the folk music of North India, a style that was referred to as local music.

Indo-Caribbean music plays a vital role in various annual festivals like the springtime phagwa, where chowtal is traditionally performed competitively and in teams. Indo-Caribbean Shia Muslims celebrate Hosay (Muharram) with floats accompanied by barrel drums called tassa. Wedding music is another important part of Indo-Caribbean music, and is dominated by tan singing. Tan singing is accompanied by the dholak drum and dhantal, and sometimes includes verbal duels influenced by picong. Indo-Caribbean popular music gained international attention in the late 1980s, with the rise of chutney music. Chutney is a dance music, in its modern form accompanied by soca instrumentation, such as synthesizers and pressure drums. This style is called chutney-soca.
