= Music of Martinique =

The music of Martinique has a heritage which is intertwined with that of its sister island, Guadeloupe. Despite their small size, the islands have created a large popular music industry, which gained in international renown after the success of zouk music in the later 20th century. Zouk's popularity was particularly intense in France, where the genre became an important symbol of identity for Martinique and Guadeloupe. Zouk's origins are in the folk music of Martinique and Guadeloupe, especially Martinican chouval bwa, and Guadeloupan gwo ka. There's also notable influence of the pan-Caribbean calypso tradition and Haitian kompa.

== Folk music ==
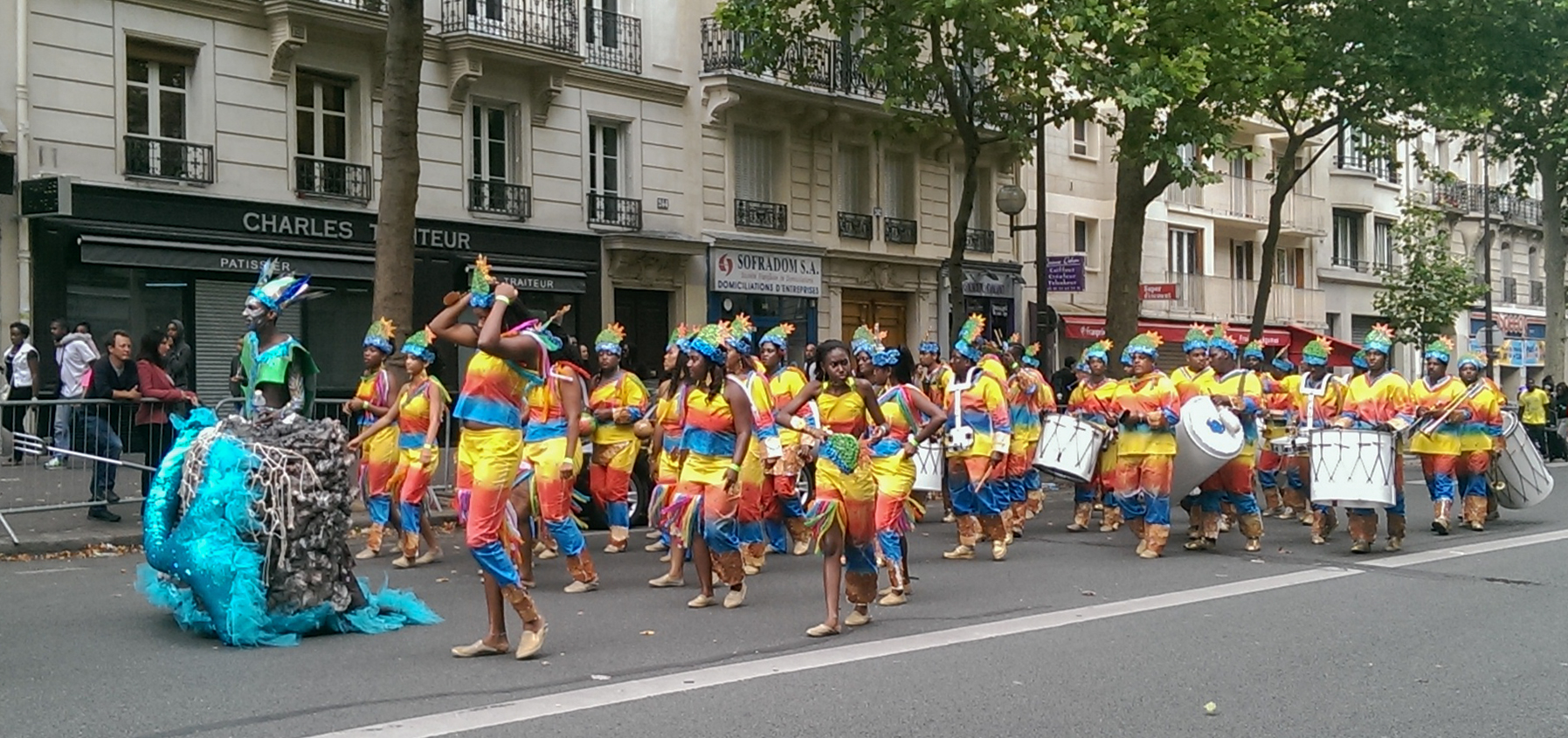
A band from Martinique during the 2014 Tropical Carnival of Paris

Carnival is a very important festival, known as Vaval on Martinique. Music plays a vital role, with Martinican big bands marching across the island. Vaval declined following World War II, bouncing back with new band formats and new traditions only in the 1980s. Like Guadeloupe, Martinique features participatory, call-and-response style songs during its Vaval celebrations.

In the early 20th century on Martinique, Creole bands travelled on trucks or small carts during Vaval, playing a music known as biguine vidé (or just videé). After the decline of Vaval in World War II, the tradition began anew in the 1980s, when large marching bands of fifty or more people became common, including a number of horn players, percussionists and dancers. These large bands, known as groups à pied, are each identified with a neighborhood.

=== Biguine vidé ===
Biguine vidé is an up-tempo version of the biguine rhythm, combining other carnival elements. It participatory music, with the bandleader singing a verse and the audience responding. Modern instrumentation includes a variety of improvised drums made from containers of all kinds, plastic plumbing, bells, tanbou débonda, bélé chacha, tibwa and bélé drums. Aside from the biguine vidé bands, Vaval includes song and costume contests, masquerading and zouk parties.

=== Bélé ===
The bel air (or bélé) is a legacy of the slave music tradition. The bélé itself is a huge tambour drum that players ride as though it was a horse. It is characterized, in its rhythm, by the "tibwa" (two wooden sticks) played on a length of bamboo mounted on a stand to the tambour bélé, and is often accompanied by a chacha (a maracas). The tibwa rhythm plays a basic pattern and the drum comes to mark the highlights and introduce percussion improvisations.

It is organized in a certain way, the first entry of the singer ( lavwa ) and choir ( lavwa Deye or "answer"). Then the "Bwatè" (player ti bwa) sets the pace, followed by bélé drum. Finally, the dancers take the stage. A dialogue is created between the dancers and the "tanbouyè" (drummer). The "answer" play opposite the singer, the audience can also participate. As a family, together singers, dancers, musicians and audiences are lured by its mesmerizing rhythms. The bélé song-dances include, bélé dous, bélé pitjè, biguine bélé, bélé belya, and gran bélé

The bélé is the origin of several important Martiniquan popular styles, including chouval bwa and biguine, and also exerted an influence on zouk.

Edmond Mondesir is a popular bélé musician from Martinique.

=== Chouval bwa ===
Chouval bwa is a kind of Martinican traditional music, featuring percussion, bamboo flute, accordion, and comb and paper-type kazoo. The music originated among rural Martinicans, as a form of celebratory holiday music played to accompany a dance called the manege (which translates as merry-go-round; chouval bwa is a Creole version of cheval bois, which refers to the wooden horses seen on merry-go-rounds). Chouval bwa percussion is played by a drummer on the tanbour drum and the ti bwa, a percussion instrument made out of a piece of bamboo laid horizontally and beaten with sticks; the most traditional ensembles also use accordions, chacha (a rattle) and the bel-air, a bass version of the tanbour.

=== Quadrille ===
In French Caribbean culture, especially of the Lesser Antilles, the term kwadril is a Creole term referring to a folk dance derived from the quadrille. kwadril dances are in sets consisting of proper quadrilles, plus creolized versions of 19th-century couple dances: biguines, mazouks and valses Créoles.

Instrumentation consists of variable combinations of accordion, guitar, violin, tanbou dibas, chacha (either a single metal cylinder as in Martinique, or calabash without a handle, held in both hands), malakach (maracas), triangle, bwa (tibwa) and syak, a bamboo rasp one metre long, grooved on both top and bottom, held with one end on the belly and the other on a door or wall and scraped with both hands.

== Popular music ==
Though Martinique and Guadeloupe are most frequently known only for the internationally renowned zouk style, the islands have also produced popular musicians in various updated styles of traditional biguine, chouval bwa and gwo ka. The world-famous zouk band Kassav' remains easily the most famous performers from the island. Chouval bwa has been popularized by Claude Germany, Tumpak, Dédé Saint-Prix, and Pakatak.

Martinique is also the birthplace of the Gibson Brothers who achieved significant chart success worldwide, most notably with their single "Cuba".

=== Biguine ===
Biguine is a Martinican form of clarinet and trombone music which can be divided into two distinct types:

- bidgin bélè or drum biguine – originates in slave bèlè dances and characterized by the use of bélè drums and tibwa rhythm sticks, along with call and response, nasal vocals and improvised instrumental solos; has its roots in West African ritual dances, though ceremonial components do not survive in Haitian biguine.
- orchestrated biguine – originates in Saint-Pierre in the 18th century, highly influenced by French music though vocals are usually in creole.

Evolving out of string band music, biguine spread to mainland France in the 1920s. Early stars like Alexandre Stellio and Sam Castandet became popular. Its popularity abroad died relatively quickly, but it lasted as a major force in popular music on Martinique until Haitian compas took over in the 1950s and mini-jazz artists like Les Gentlemen and Les Vikings de Guadeloupe became popular in the late 1960s. In the later part of the 20th century, biguine musicians like clarinet virtuoso Michel Godzom helped revolutionize the genre.

=== Cadence (Kadans)/Compas ===
In the 1970s, a wave of Haitian, mostly musicians, to Dominica and the French Antilles (Guadeloupe and Martinique) brought with them the kadans (another word named for the genre compas), a sophisticated form of music that quickly swept the island and helped unite all the former French colonies of the Caribbean by combining their cultural influences. These Haitians drew upon previous success from mini-jazz artists like Les Gentlemen, Les Leopards, and Les Vikings de Guadeloupe.

Later in the decade and into the 1980s, the French Antilles became home to a style of cadence music called cadence-lypso. Gordon Henderson's Exile One innovated this style, as well as turned the mini-jazz combos into guitar-dominated big bands with a full-horn section and the newly arrived synthesizers, paving the way for the success of large groups like Grammacks, Experience 7, among others. Drawing on these influences, the supergroup Kassav' invented zouk and popularized it with hit songs like "Zouk-La-Se Sel Medikaman Nou Ni". Kassav' formed from Paris in 1978.

=== Mini-jazz ===
Mini-jazz was formed in the mid-60s characterized by the rock bands formula of two guitars, one bass, drum-conga-cowbell, some use an alto sax or a full horn section, others use a keyboard, accordion or lead guitar. However, all these small jazz or bands had their guitars with sophisticated styles. The 1970s were dominated by mini-jazz, which still used a variant of the méringue style. One of the mini-jazz groups, Tabou Combo, became the most popular ensemble of Haiti. From Haiti the mini-jazz formula replicated in the French Antilles in the 1970s.

=== Cadence-lypso ===
The most influential figure in the promotion of Cadence-lypso was the Dominican group Exile One (based on the island of Guadeloupe) that featured mostly the cadence rampa of Haiti and calypso music from the English speaking caribbean. It was pushed in the 1970s by groups from Dominica, and was the first style of Dominican music to find international acclaim.

Dominica cadence music has evolved under the influence of Dominican and Caribbean/Latin rhythms, as well as rock and roll, soul, and funk music from the United States. By the end of the 1970s, Gordon Henderson defined Cadence-lypso as "a synthesis of Caribbean and African musical patterns fusing the traditional with the contemporary".

Aside from Exile One, other bands included the Grammacks, Black Roots, Black Machine, Naked Feet, Belles Combo, Mantra, Black Affairs, Liquid Ice, Wafrikai, Midnighte Groovers and Milestone, while the most famous singers included Bill Thomas, Chubby Marc, Gordon Henderson, Linford John, Janet Azouz, Sinky Rabess, Tony Valmond, Jeff Joseph, Mike Moreau, Anthony Gussie and Ophelia Marie.

=== Zouk ===
The inspiration for Zouk's style of rhythmic music comes from the Haitian compas, as well as music called cadence-lypso - Dominica cadence popularized by Grammacks and Exile One. Elements of gwo ka, tambour, ti bwa and biguine vidé are prominent in zouk. Though there are many diverse styles of zouk, some commonalities exist. The French Creole tongue of Martinique and Guadeloupe is an important element, and are a distinctive part of the music. Generally, zouk is based around star singers, with little attention given to instrumentalists, and is based almost entirely around studio recordings.

Music authors Charles De Ledesma and Gene Scaramuzzo trace zouk's development to the Guadeloupean gwo ka and Martinican bèlè (tambour and ti bwa) folk traditions. Ethnomusicologist Jocelyn Guilbault, however, describes zouk as a synthesis of Caribbean popular styles, especially Dominica cadence-lypso, Haitian cadence, Guadeloupean biguine. Zouk arose in the late 1970s and early 1980s, using elements of previous styles of Antillean music, as well as imported genres.

=== Zouk-love ===
Zouk Love is the French Antilles cadence or compas, characterized by a slow, soft and sexual rhythm. The lyrics of the songs often speak of love and sentimental problems.

The music cabo-love from Cape Verde are also derivative of this French Antillean compas style, which sounds basically the same, although there are notable differences once you become more familiar with these genre. A main exponent of this subgenre is Ophelia Marie. Other Zouk Love artists come from the French West Indies, the Netherlands, and Africa.

Popular artists include French West Indian artists Edith Lefel and Nichols, or like Netherlands based Suzanna Lubrano and Gil Semedo, the African artist Kaysha.

=== Bouyon (Jump up) ===
Bouyon (Boo-Yon) is a form of popular music of Dominica. Bouyon was developed in the 1980s by bands like WCK, combining elements of kadans (or cadence-lypso), lapo kabwit drumming, the folk style jing-ping, and a quick-paced electronic drum pattern. More recently, deejays with raggamuffin-style vocals have moved to the fore, updating the sound for the New Generation.

In Guadeloupe and Martinique, "Jump up" refers generally to bouyon music.

=== French Antilles hip hop ===
The French Antilles hip hop is a style of hip hop music originating from the French departments of Guadeloupe and Martinique in the Caribbean. Usually in French and Antillean creole, the French Antilles hip hop is most popular in the French Antilles and France.

== Music festivals ==
Two large, international music festivals have further bolstered Martinique's music scene. Jazz à la Martinique and Carrefour Mondial de Guitare alternate years. The country's best jazz musicians are featured during Jazz à la Martinique, but major worldwide players like Branford Marsalis also perform. Honoring the guitar, Carrefour Mondial de Guitare celebrates a wide range of guitar genres, including flamenco, blues, jazz, rock, and pop. Both festivals last approximately a week, with concerts in various locations throughout Martinique. Recently, Franck Nicolas presented "Bélé-Jazz", a style of jazz using the bélé rhythms as its basis.

== See also ==
- Canboulay
