= Culture of Dominica =

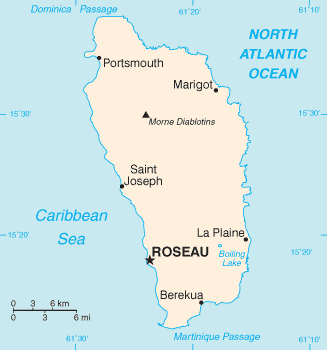
Map of Dominica

The culture of Dominica is formed by the inhabitants of the Commonwealth of Dominica. Dominica is home to a wide range of people. Although it was historically occupied by several native tribes, it was the Taíno and Kalinago tribes that remained by the time European settlers reached the island. "Massacre" is a name of a river dedicated to the murders of the native villagers by both French and British settlers, because the river "ran red with blood for days." Each (French and British) claimed the island and imported slaves from Africa. The remaining Kalinago now live on a 3,700-acre (15 km^{2}) Kalinago Territory on the east coast of the island. They elect their own chief.

Dominica is often seen as a society that is migrating from collectivism to that of individualism. The economy is a developing one that previously depended on agriculture. Signs of collectivism are evident in the small towns and villages that are spread across the island.

Dominican cuisine is similar to that of other Caribbean countries. Common main courses comprise meat (usually chicken, but can be goat, lamb, or beef) covered in sauce. The sauces are either spicy pepper sauces, or concoctions made from local fruit. A huge variety of local fruit, from tamarind to passion fruit, are served on the island, usually in juice or sauce form. Soursop is peeled and eaten raw. Sorrel, a red flower that only blooms around Christmas, is boiled into a bright red drink.

== National psyche ==
Dominica draws on a mix of cultures. Names of French places appear as often as English. African language, foods and customs often mingle with European traditions as part of the island's Creole culture. The Caribs still carve dugouts (canoes), build houses on stilts, and weave distinctive basketwork. Rastafarian and Black pride influences are also common. The Bahá'í Faith in Dominica is practiced by about 1% of the population. However, the core of Dominican culture is deeply embedded in the European culture, specifically that of the British. This is reflected in the etiquette, courtesies, mannerisms, bureaucracies and so on, observed throughout the island.

With an almost 80% Roman Catholic population, conservative and traditional values are strong. Family holds an important place in Dominican society. To a great enough extent that a government poster warning Dominicans of the dangers of transporting illegal drugs lists separation from family (followed by imprisonment and loss of life) as the number one deterrent to the crime.

== Amerindians ==
The first settlers on the island arrived to the Commonwealth of Dominica about 400 BC. The Arawak, a group of peaceful hunter-gatherers established villages after island-hopping across the Eastern-Caribbean. The more aggressive hunter-gatherers, the Kalinago, annihilated the Arawaks and took hold of the island. The majority of native Caribbean people on other Caribbean islands were killed by European colonists. The local Dominican Caribbean natives were able to hide in areas that were hard for European soldiers to find. The English Queen granted a 3,700-acre (15 km^{2}) territory in east coast of Dominica for the native Caribbeans in 1903. Today, there are only 3000 Caribs remaining after years of brutal treatment by the Spanish, French and English. They live in eight villages, and they elect their own chief.

On the east side of the island, the descendants of the Caribs continued to practice their time-honoured culture and crafts of canoe building and basket weaving. Their society, however, has developed and modernized. The Amerindians' influence remains on the island through their artifacts and the sounds of modern language. For example, the word hurricane originated from the Amerindian word huracan.

== Other settlers ==
When Christopher Columbus passed by the island he did give Dominica its name, but left no other settlers on the island. It would be years before English and French settlers came to the island. These two European superpowers fought relentlessly for the island, and their cultures each took hold. However, African slaves have also left an indelible mark on the island.

French influences include the island's native language, Kwéyòl, food, and many location names. The British government won the island, and the influences of government as well as the official language are distinctly theirs. Africans also influenced the Creole and food, as well as the distinctive local style of dress.

== Carnival ==
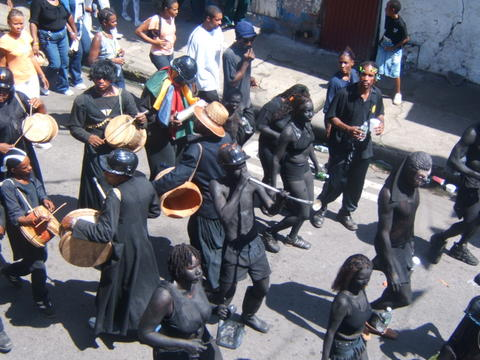
Good Hope Black Devils jumping up in Roseau Carnival 2006

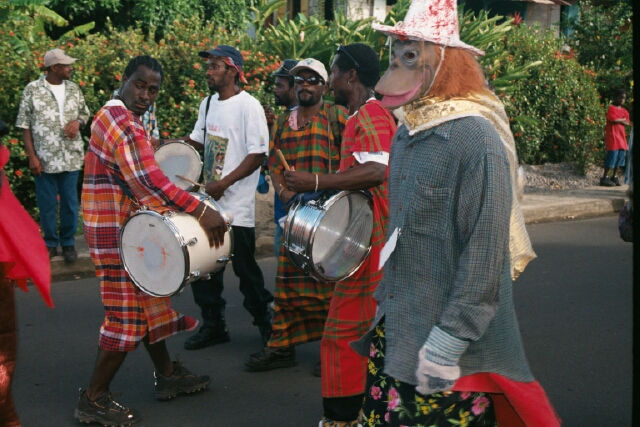
A Dominican Carnival costume band

Chanté mas (masquerade song) and Lapo kabwit is a form of Carnival music of Dominica. It is performed by masquerading partygoers in a two-day parade, in a call-and-response format call "lavwé", with a lead female singer or "chantwèl" dancing backwards in front of the drummer on a tambou lélé. The Carnival has African and French roots and is otherwise known as Mas Dominik, considered to be the most original Carnival in the Caribbean. Dominica's carnival is known to be the most original and least commercialized giving the carnival its name, the original mas.

The chanté mas tradition started to become dominated by imported calypso and steel pan music in the early 1960s. After a fire in 1963, the traditional carnival was banned, though calypso and steelpan continued to grow in popularity. Calypso appealed to Carnival partygoers because the lyrical focus on local news and gossip was similar to that of chanté mas, despite a rhythmic pattern and instrumentation that contrast sharply with traditional Dominican Mas Domnik music.

Though the traditional Chanté mas and Lapo kabrit declined in popularity due to imported calypso and steel pan music, several villages on Dominica, such as Grand Bay, has preserved the unique Dominican tradition. On modern Dominica, Chanté mas and lapo kabrit has become a part of bouyon music.

Each year, Dominicans celebrate the Catholic Carnival, a festival held for three days before Ash Wednesday. Due to the country's French heritage, a majority of citizens are Catholic, but many non-Catholics also celebrate Carnival. Activities include the Calypso Monarch Competition, Carnival Queen Pageant, and Carnival parades and parties.

== Music ==
Music and dance are important facets of Dominica's culture. The annual independence celebrations show an outburst of traditional song and dance preceded since 1997 by weeks of Creole expressions such as "Creole in the Park" and the "World Creole Music Festival". Dominica gained prominence on the international music stage when in 1973, Gordon Henderson founded the group Exile One and an original musical genre that he coined "Cadence-lypso", which paved the way for modern Creole music.

The 11th annual World Creole Music Festival was the first activity held there since its completion on 27 October 2007, part of the island's celebration of independence from Great Britain on 3 November. A year-long reunion celebration began in January 2008 marking 30 years of independence.

Carnival had arrived with the French, indentured laborers and the slaves, who could not take part in Carnival, formed their own, parallel celebration called canboulay (from the French cannes brulées, meaning burnt cane) — the precursor for Trinidad's carnival and has played an important role in the development of Trinidad's culture. During the carnival season, the slaves performed songs in tents called Kaiso — later Calypso tents. Many early kaiso or calypso were performed in the French creole language and led by a griot or chantwell. As Trinidad became a British colony, the chantwell became known as the calypsonian. The British government tried to ban the celebration of carnival due to its aggressive overtone; this led to canboulay Riots between the Afro-creoles and the police, which banned the use of Stick fighting and African percussion music in 1881. They were replaced by bamboo "Bamboo-Tamboo" sticks beaten together, which were themselves banned in turn. In 1937 they reappeared, transformed as an orchestra of frying pans, dustbin lids and oil drums. These steelpans or pans are now a major part of the Trinidadian music scene.

Calypso's early rise was closely connected with the adoption of Carnival by Trinidadian slaves, including canboulay drumming and the music masquerade processions. The French brought Carnival to Trinidad, and calypso competitions at Carnival grew in popularity, especially after the abolition of slavery in 1834. From Trinidad, the carnival, calypso and steel pan spread to the entire English speaking Caribbean islands. Calypso in the Caribbean includes a range of genres, including: the Benna genre of Antiguan and Barbudan music; Mento, a style of Jamaican folk music that greatly influenced ska and reggae; Ska, the precursor to rocksteady and reggae; Spouge, a style of Barbadian popular music.

In Dominica, the chanté mas and lapo kabwit tradition started to become dominated by imported calypso and steel pan music in the early 1960s. After a fire in 1963, the traditional carnival was banned, though calypso and steelpan continued to grow in popularity. Calypso appealed to Carnival partygoers because the lyrical focus on local news and gossip was similar to that of chanté mas, despite a rhythmic pattern and instrumentation which contrast sharply with traditional Dominican "Mas Domnik" music. Many of the traditional chanté mas (masquerade songs) were performed to the calypso beat and later the new reggae beat coming out of Jamaica.

Calypsonians and Calypso Monarch competitions emerged and became extremely popular. Steelbands emerged all around Dominica and the rest of the Caribbean islands. Calypso music has been popular in Dominica since the 1950s; the first Calypso King was crowned in 1959. Bands such as Swinging Stars, The Gaylords, De Boys an Dem, Los Caballeros and Swinging Busters surfaced and began to cut records. The emergence of radio, first WIDBS and later Radio Dominica helped to spread the music.

In the 1960s, a number of Haitian musicians to the French Antilles (Guadeloupe and Martinique) brought with them the kadans (another word named for the genre "compas"), a sophisticated form of music that quickly swept the island and helped unite all the former French colonies of the Caribbean by combining their cultural influences. Webert Sicot, the originator of cadence recorded three LPs albums with French Antilles producers: two with "Celini disques" in Guadeloupe and one with "Balthazar" in Martinique. Haitian compas or cadence bands were asked to integrate Antillean musicians. Consequently, the leading "Les Guais troubadours", with influential singer Louis Lahens, among other bands, played a very important role in the schooling of Antilleans to the méringue compas or kadans music style. Almost all existing Haitian compas bands have toured these islands that have since adopted the music and the dance of the meringue. These were followed by French Antillean mini-jazz artists like Les Gentlemen, Les Leopards, and Les Vikings de Guadeloupe.

In 1969, Gordon Henderson of Dominica decided that the French Overseas Department of Guadeloupe had everything he needed to begin a career in Creole music. From there, lead singer Gordon Henderson went on to be the founder of a kadans fusion band, the Vikings of Guadeloupe – of which Kassav's co-founder Pierre-Eduard Decimus was a member. At some point he felt that he should start his own group and asked a former school friend Fitzroy Williams to recruit a few Dominicans to complete those he had already selected. The group was named Exile One. The band added various Caribbean styles to their musical identity such as reggae, calypso and mostly cadence or compas as the band moved to Guadeloupe. In 1973, Exile One (based on the island of Guadeloupe) initiated a fusion of cadence and calypso "Cadence-lypso" that would later influence the creation of soca music. The Trinidadian Calypso and Haitian kadans or méringue were the two dominants music styles of Dominica so Exile One, that featured calypso, reggae and mostly kadans or compas, called its music Cadence-lypso however, most of the band's repertoire was kadans.

Later in 1975, Lord Shorty of Trinidad visited his good friend Maestro in Dominica where he stayed (at Maestro's house) for a month while they visited and worked with local kadans artists. You had Maestro experimenting with calypso and cadence ("cadence-lypso"). A year later Maestro died in an accident in Dominica and his loss was palpably felt by Shorty, who penned "Higher World" as a tribute. In Dominica, Shorty had attended an Exile One performance of cadence-lypso, and collaborated with Dominica's 1969 Calypso King, Lord Tokyo and two calypso lyricists, Chris Seraphine and Pat Aaron in the early 1970s, who wrote him some kwéyòl lyrics. Soon after Shorty released a song, "Ou Petit", with words such as "Ou dee moin ou petit Shorty" (meaning "you told me you are small Shorty"), a combination of calypso, cadence and kwéyòl. Soca's development includes its fusion of calypso, cadence, and Indian musical instruments—particularly the dholak, tabla and dhantal—as demonstrated in Shorty's classic compositions "Ïndrani" and "Shanti Om".

Due to the popularity of Exile One, there was a virtual explosion of kadans bands from Dominica - Grammacks, Liquid Ice, Midnight Groovers, Black Affairs, Black Machine, Mantra, Belles Combo, Milestone, Wafrikai, Black roots, Black Blood, Naked Feet and Mammouth among others. Leading vocalists of the period include Gordon Henderson, Jeff Joseph, Marcel "Chubby" Marc, Anthony Gussie, Mike Moreau, Tony Valmond, Linford John, Bill Thomas, SinkyRabess and Janet Azouz among others. Dominican kadans bands became popular in Martinique, Guadeloupe, Haiti and other islands in the Caribbean and Africa.

The full-horn section kadans band Exile One led by Gordon Henderson was the first to introduce the newly arrived synthesizers to their music that other young cadence or méringue bands from Haiti (mini-jazz) and the French Antilles emulated in the 1970s. Gordon Henderson's Exile One turned the mini-jazz combos into guitar-dominated big bands with a full-horn section and the newly arrived synthesizers, paving the way for the success of large groups like Grammacks, Experience 7, among others. Drawing on these influences, the supergroup Kassav' invented zouk and popularized it in the 1980s.

Kassav' was formed in 1979 by Pierre-Edouard Décimus and Paris studio musician Jacob F. Desvarieux. Together and under the influence of well-known Dominican and Guadeloupean kadans-lypso or compas bands like Experience 7, Grammacks, Exile One and Les Aiglons they decided to make Guadeloupean carnival music recording it in a more fully orchestrated yet modern and polished style. Kassav' created its own style "zouk" by introducing an 11-piece gwo ka unit and two lead singers, tambour bélé, ti bwa, biguine, cadence-lypso: calypso and mostly Cadence rampa or compas with full use of the MIDI technology. Kassav was the first band in the Caribbean to apply the MIDI technology to their music. In the 1980s they took Caribbean music to another level by recording in the new digital format. The style lost ground in the late 1980s due to the strong presence of cadence or compas, the main music of the French Antilles.

A special style within the zouk is "zouk love", characterized by a slow, soft and sexual rhythm. The inspiration for the zouk love style of rhythmic music comes from the Haitian compas, as well as music called cadence-lypso — Dominica cadence as popularized by Grammacks and Exile One. The lyrics of the songs often speak of love and sentimental problems.

The music kizomba from Angola and cola-zouk or cabo love from Cape Verde are derivatives of this French Antillean compas music style, which sounds basically the same, although there are notable differences once you become more familiar with these genres. A main exponent of this subgenre is Ophelia Marie of Dominica. Other Zouk Love artists come from the French West Indies, the Netherlands, and Africa.

In Brazil, the zouk rhythm is used to dance the Brazilian Lambada. Since the addition of many new steps changed the characteristics from Lambada, a new name was given to this dance "Zouk-lambada", which was originally called "zouk Love", later just "zouk". Today, the Brazilian Zouk has changed, and the name "Traditional Zouk" has been given to the dance that was first taught by Adilio and Renata in the beginning of the '90s, which is now didactically used all over the world.

In the late '80s, the WCK or Windward Caribbean Kulture, was formed by a group of highly creative young Dominican musicians. The band heralded in a new and much needed resurgence of live music and created a new wave in Dominicas musical evolution. They began experimenting with a fusion of cadence-lypso, the native lapo kabwit drum rhythms and elements of the music of jing ping bands. This group came together to fill a void left by several of Dominica's most internationally recognized bands such as Exile One and Grammacks. While the Cadence-Lypso sound is based on the creative use of acoustic drums, an aggressive up-tempo guitar beat and strong social commentary in the native Creole language, the new sound created by WCK, focused more on the use of technology with a strong emphasis on keyboard rhythmic patterns.

The band played a blend of the local Cadence-lypso and traditional Jing ping, chanté mas and lapo kabwit rhythms, which would later be labelled "bouyon", a genre which they are credited with creating. Dominican-born Derick "Rah" Peters is considered to be one of the most influential figures in the development of the bouyon genre. Bouyon as popularized largely by the WCK band blends in jing ping, cadence-lypso, and traditional dances namely bèlè, quadrille, chanté mas and lapo kabwit, mazurka, zouk and other styles of Caribbean music. From a language perspective, Bouyon draws on English and Kwéyòl.

Bouyon music is popular across the Caribbean and is known as "bouyon gwada" or jump up music in Guadeloupe and Martinique. A popular offshoot within the bouyon gwada is called "bouyon hardcore", a style characterized by its lewd and violent lyrics. This musical style is characterized by texts "slackness" sexually explicit. It is a form of radicalized bouyon of Dominica. Some call it bouyon gwada (Guadeloupe bouyon) to mark its difference and its themes are often the same.

== Literature ==
English printer William Smith introduced publishing to Dominica with the Dominica Gazette periodical in 1765, and a three-part poem entitled "The Shipwreck" in 1767. In later centuries, the island's literary scene featured Phyllis Shand Allfrey, Lennox Honychurch, Jean Rhys, and Daniel Thaly among other writers.

== Cuisine ==
Dominica's cuisine is similar to that of other Caribbean islands, particularly Trinidad and St Lucia. Like other Commonwealth Caribbean islands, Dominicans have developed a distinct twist to their cuisine. Breakfast is an important daily meal, typically including saltfish, dried and salted codfish, and "bakes," fried dough. Saltfish and bakes are combined for a fast-food snack that can be eaten throughout the day; vendors on Dominica's streets sell these snacks to passersby, together with fried chicken, fish and fruit and yogurt "smoothies". Other breakfast meals include cornmeal porridge, which is made with fine cornmeal or polenta, milk and condensed milk and sugar to sweeten. Traditional British-influenced dishes, such as eggs, bacon and toast, are also popular, as are fried fish and plantains.

Common vegetables include Plantain, Tania (a root vegetable), Yam, Potato, rice and peas. Meat and poultry typically eaten include chicken (which is very popular), beef, and fish. These are often prepared in stews with onions, carrots, garlic, ginger and herbs like thyme. The vegetables and meat are browned to create a rich dark sauce. Popular meals include rice and peas, brown stew chicken, stew beef, fried and stewed fish, and many different types of hearty fish broths and soups. These are filled with dumplings, carrots and ground provisions.

== Religion ==
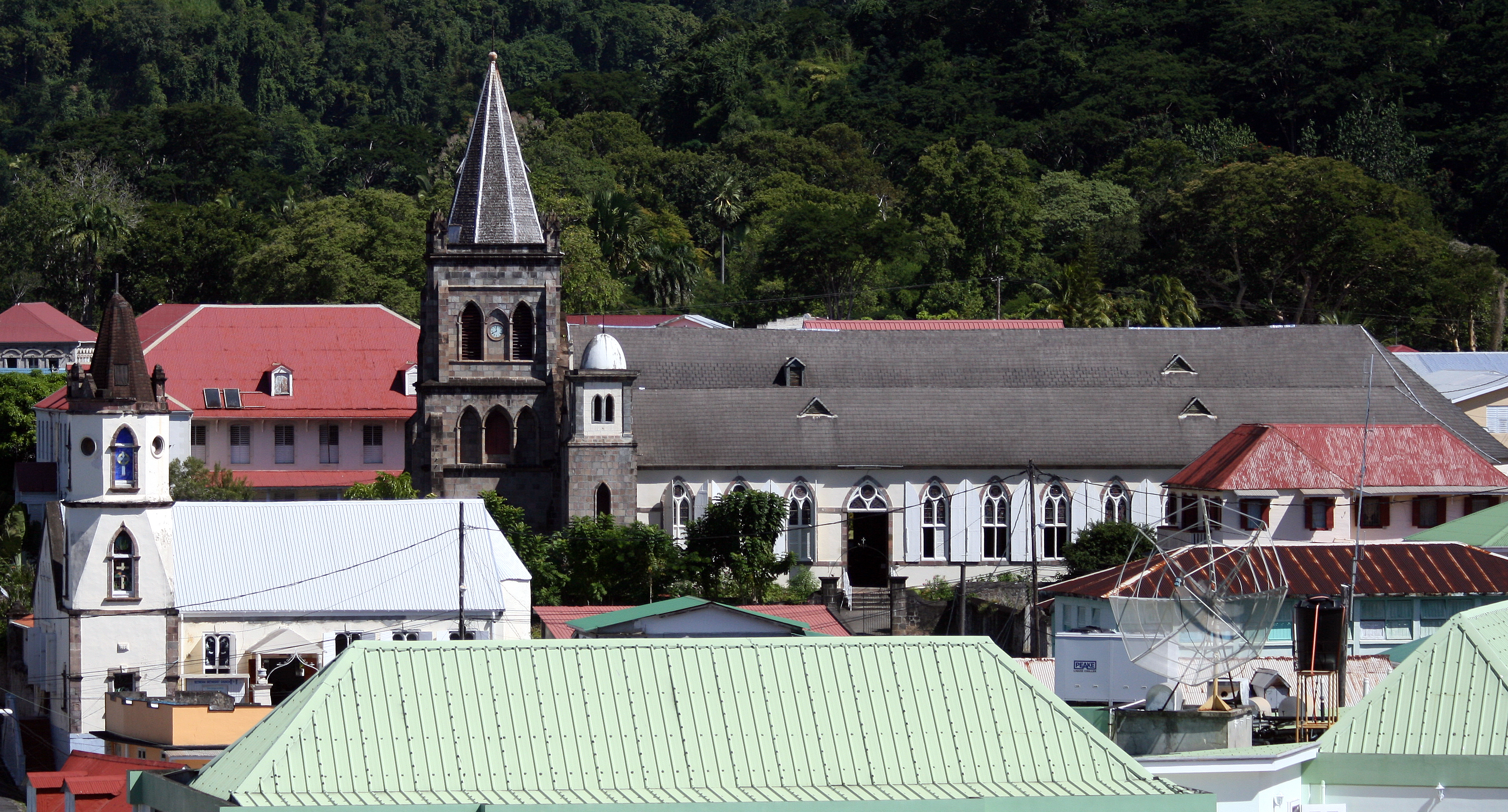
Churches in Roseau, Dominica

According to the 2001 population and housing census, approximately 61 percent of Dominica's population is Roman Catholic. Followers of evangelical churches represent 18 percent of the population, Seventh-day Adventists 6 percent, and Methodists 3.7 percent. Minority religious groups and denominations, whose members range from 1.6 percent to 0.2 percent of the population, include Rastafarians, Jehovah's Witnesses, Anglicans, and Muslims. According to the census, 1.4 percent of the population belongs to "other" religious groups, including Baptist, Nazarene, Church of Christ, Brethren Christian, and the Baha'i Faith; 6 percent of the population claims no religious affiliation.

The Constitution provides for freedom of religion, and other laws and policies contributes to the generally free practice of religion. The law at all levels protects this right in full against abuse, either by governmental or private actors. The Government generally respects religious freedom in practice. In 2008, the U.S. government received no reports of societal abuses or discrimination based on religious affiliation, belief, or practice.

== See also ==
- Public holidays in Dominica
- List of museums in Dominica
- Dominican tea culture
