= Music of Guadeloupe =

The music of Guadeloupe encompasses a large popular music industry, which gained in international renown after the success of zouk music in the later 20th century. Zouk's popularity was particularly intense in France, where the genre became an important symbol of identity for Guadeloupe and Martinique. Zouk's origins are in the folk music of Guadeloupe and Martinique, especially Guadeloupan gwo ka and Martinican chouval bwa, and the pan-Caribbean calypso tradition.

== Folk music ==
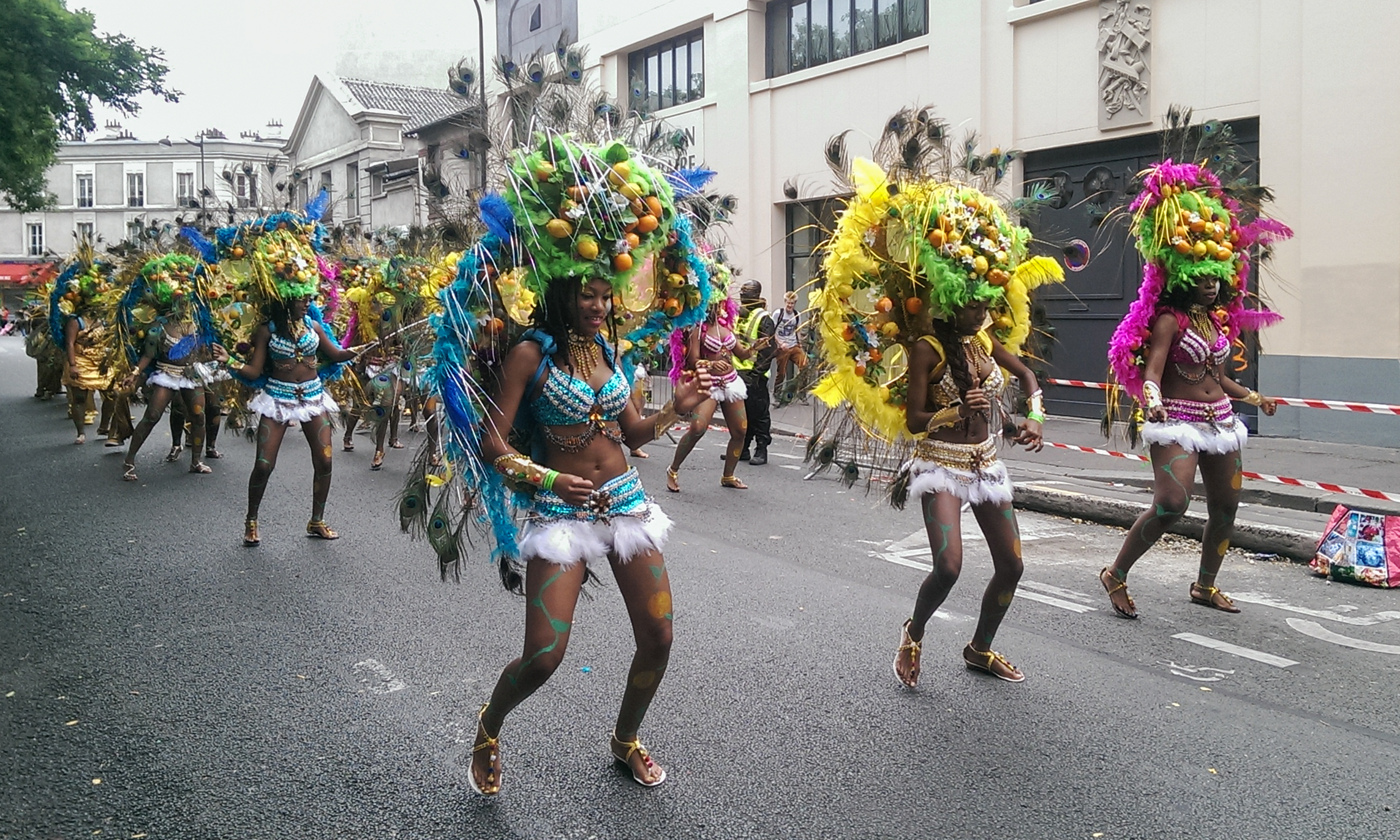
A band from Guadeloupe during the 2014 Tropical Carnival of Paris

Carnival is a very important festival in Guadeloupe and Martinique. Music plays a vital role, with Guadeloupean gwo ka ensembles, zouk music and guadeloupean big bands marching across the island, and travelling and performing music known as C (or just videé) in a manner akin to Brazilian samba schools. Carnival in both islands declined following World War II, bouncing back with new band formats and new traditions only in the 1980s. Both islands feature participatory, call-and-response style songs during their Carnival celebrations.

=== Biguine vidé ===
Biguine vidé is an up tempo version of the biguine rhythm, combining other carnival elements. It is participatory music, with the bandleader singing a verse and the audience responding. It allows one to grab an improvised percussion instrument and join in. Traditionally, Carnival includes dances of African origin, including laghia, haut-taille, grage, calinda and bel-air. Traditional instruments include the chacha, tibwa, maké, boula, tanbou chan and tanbou bas drums. Aside from the biguine vidé bands, Vaval includes song and costume contests, masquerading and zouk parties.

=== Gwo ka ===
Gwo ka played in Basse-Terre.

Gwo ka is a family of hand drums used to create a form of folk music from Guadeloupe. There are seven basic rhythms in gwo ka, and multiple variations on each. Different sizes of drums establish the foundation and its flourishes, with the largest, the boula, playing the central rhythm and the smaller, markeur (or maké) drums embellishes upon it and interplays with the dancers, audience or singer. Gwo ka singing is usually guttural, nasal and rough, though it can also be bright and smooth, and is accompanied by uplifting and complex harmonies and melodies.

Rural Guadeloupans still use gwo ka drums in communal experiences called lewozes; this is the most traditional manifestation of gwo ka in modern Guadeloupe. Gwo ka is also played at Carnival and other celebrations. A modernized and popularized form of gwo ka is well known on the islands; it is known as gwo ka moderne.

=== Balakadri ===
Guadeloupean balakadri persisted into the 20th century and, despite disruption after World War II, made a comeback in the 1980s. The Guadeloupean-administered island of Marie-Galante has also had a vital and well-documented balakadri tradition. As in Martinique (and the Creole-speaking islands of Saint Lucia and Dominica), kwadril dances are in sets consisting of proper quadrilles, plus creolized versions of 19th-century couple dances: biguines, mazouks and valses Créoles.

== Popular music ==
Though Guadeloupe and Martinique are most frequently known only for the internationally renowned zouk style, the islands have also produced popular musicians in various updated styles of traditional biguine, chouval bwa and gwo ka. The world-famous zouk band Kassav' remains easily the most famous performers from the island, while the Guadeloupan Carnival band Akiyo has become the only group in that style to record commercially.

=== Cadence (Kadans)/Compas ===
In the 1970s, a wave of Haitian, mostly musicians, to Dominica and the French Antilles (Guadeloupe and Martinique) brought with them the kadans, a sophisticated form of music that quickly swept the island and helped unite all the former French colonies of the Caribbean by combining their cultural influences. These Haitians drew upon previous success from mini-jazz artists like Les Gentlemen, Les Leopards, and Les Vikings de Guadeloupe.

Later in the decade and into the 1980s, the French Antilles became home to a style of cadence music called cadence-lypso. Gordon Henderson's Exile One innovated this style, as well as turned the mini-jazz combos into guitar-dominated big bands with a full-horn section and the newly arrived synthesizers, paving the way for the success of large groups like Grammacks, Experience 7, among others. Drawing on these influences, the supergroup Kassav' invented zouk and popularized it with hit songs like "Zouk-La-Se Sel Medikaman Nou Ni". Kassav' formed from Paris in 1978.

=== Mini-jazz ===
Mini-jazz was formed in the mid-60s characterized by the rock bands formula of two guitars, one bass, drum-conga-cowbell, some use an alto sax or a full horn section, others use a keyboard, accordion or lead guitar. However, all these small jazz or bands had their guitars with sophisticated styles. The 1970s were dominated by mini-jazz, which still used a variant of the méringue style. One of the mini-jazz groups, Tabou Combo, became the most popular ensemble of Haiti. From Haiti the mini-jazz formula replicated in the French Antilles in the 1970s.

=== Cadence-lypso ===
The most influential figure in the promotion of Cadence-lypso was the Dominican group Exile One (based on the island of Guadeloupe) that featured mostly the cadence rampa of Haiti and calypso music from the English speaking caribbean. It was pushed in the 1970s by groups from Dominica, and was the first style of Dominican music to find international acclaim.

Dominica cadence music has evolved under the influence of Dominican and Caribbean/Latin rhythms, as well as rock and roll, soul, and funk music from the United States. By the end of the 1970s, Gordon Henderson defined Cadence-lypso as "a synthesis of Caribbean and African musical patterns fusing the traditional with the contemporary".

Aside from Exile One, other bands included the Grammacks, Black Roots, Black Machine, Naked Feet, Belles Combo, Mantra, Black Affairs, Liquid Ice, Wafrikai, Midnighte Groovers and Milestone, while the most famous singers included Bill Thomas, Chubby Marc, Gordon Henderson, Linford John, Janet Azouz, Sinky Rabess, Tony Valmond, Jeff Joseph, Mike Moreau, Anthony Gussie and Ophelia Marie.

=== Zouk ===
The inspiration for Zouk's style of rhythmic music comes from the Haitian compas, as well as music called cadence-lypso - Dominica cadence popularized by Grammacks and Exile One. Elements of gwo ka, tambour, ti bwa and biguine vidé are prominent in zouk. Though there are many diverse styles of zouk, some commonalities exist. The French Creole tongue of Martinique and Guadeloupe is an important element, and are a distinctive part of the music. Generally, zouk is based around star singers, with little attention given to instrumentalists, and is based almost entirely around studio recordings.

Music authors Charles De Ledesma and Gene Scaramuzzo trace zouk's development to the Guadeloupean gwo ka and Martinican bèlè (tambour and ti bwa) folk traditions. Ethnomusicologist Jocelyne Guilbault, however, describes zouk as a synthesis of Caribbean popular styles, especially Dominica cadence-lypso, Haitian cadence, Guadeloupean biguine. Zouk arose in the late 1970s and early 1980s, using elements of previous styles of Antillean music, as well as imported genres.

=== Zouk-love ===
Zouk Love is the French Antilles cadence or compas, characterized by a slow, soft and sexual rhythm. The lyrics of the songs often speak of love and sentimental problems.

The music kizomba from Angola and cabo-love from Cape Verde are also derivatives of this French Antillean compas style, which sounds basically the same, although there are notable differences once you become more familiar with these genres. A main exponent of this subgenre is Ophelia Marie. Other Zouk Love artists come from the French West Indies, the Netherlands, and Africa.

Popular artists include French West Indian artists Edith Lefel and Nichols, or like Netherlands based Suzanna Lubrano and Gil Semedo, the African artist Kaysha.

=== Gwo ka moderne ===
A more modernized version of gwo ka is gwo ka moderne, which adds new instruments ranging from conga or djembe drums and chimes to electric bass guitar. At root, however, these styles all use the same fundamental seven rhythms as folk gwo ka. Zouk legends Kassav' played an important role in the modernization of gwo ka, giving urban credibility to a style that was seen as backward and unsophisticated; they initially played in a gro ka format, using songs from the gwo ka Carnival tradition of mas a St. Jean and even placing an homage to traditionalist drumming legend Velo on their earlier albums.

Gwo ka moderne artists include Pakala Percussion, Van Lévé and Poukoutan'n, alongside more pop-influenced musicians like Marcel Magnat and Ti Celeste, while Gerard Hubert and others have fused gwo ka with zouk. The most famous modern gwo ka performer, however, is William Flessel, whose Message Ka in 1994 became an international hit.

=== Bouyon gwada ===
Bouyon (Boo-Yon) is a form of popular music of Dominica, also known as jump up music in Guadeloupe and Martinique. The best-known band in the genre is Windward Caribbean Kulture (WCK), who originated the style in 1988 by experimenting with a fusion of cadence-lypso, jing ping and other traditional dances.

Due to the popularity of Triple K International, Ncore, and the New generation of bouyon bands who toured the French Antilles, a popular offshoot of bouyon from Guadeloupe is called bouyon gwada. The jump up had its heyday from the 90s with songs such as Met Veye WCK, but remained stamped background music or carnival. Over the years, thanks to inter-trade with the Dominicans and the mass participation of Guadeloupe at the World Creole Music Festival, the flagship group as Triple kay and MFR band began to democratize and local artists were inducted including the remix Allo Triple kay with Daly and "Big Ting Poppin 'Daly alone.

A popular offshoot within the bouyon gwada is called bouyon hardcore, a style characterized by its lewd and violent lyrics. Popular Bouyon gwada musicians include, Wee Low, Suppa, Doc J, Yellow gaza, etc.

=== French Antilles hip hop ===
The French Antilles hip hop is a style of hip hop music originating from the French departments of Guadeloupe and Martinique in the Caribbean. Usually in French and Antillean creole, the French Antilles hip hop is most popular in the French Antilles and France.'

Sidney Duteil (born Patrick Duteil in 1955 in Argenteuil, Val-d'Oise), better known as Sidney, is a French musician, rapper, DJ, television and radio host, and occasional actor of Guadeloupean origin. He is well known in France for his connection with the beginnings of the French hip hop scene.

== See also ==
- Music of France#Overseas music
