= Music of Dominica =

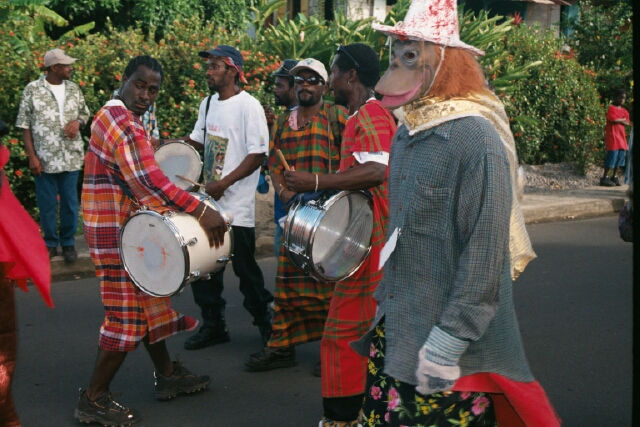
A Dominican Carnival costume band

The music of Dominica includes a variety of genres including all the popular genres of the world. Popular music is widespread, with a number of native Dominican performers gaining national fame in imported genres such as calypso, reggae, soca, kompa, zouk and rock and roll. Dominica's own popular music industry has created a form called bouyon, which combines elements from several styles and has achieved a wide fanbase in Dominica. Groups include WCK (Windward Caribbean Kulture), Native musicians in various forms, such as reggae (Nasio Fontaine, Lazo, Brother Matthew Luke), kadans (Ophelia Marie, (Exile One, Grammacks) and calypso (The Wizzard), have also become stars at home and abroad.

There is also "Cadence-lypso", the Dominica kadans, which has set the stage for some of the region's most significant musical developments such as zouk and bouyon (another Dominican creation).

Like the other Francophone musics of the Lesser Antilles, Dominican folk music is a hybrid of African and European elements. The quadrille is an important symbol of French Antillean culture, and is, on Dominica, typically accompanied by a kind of ensemble called a jing ping band. In addition, Dominica's folk tradition includes folk songs called bélé, traditional storytelling called kont, masquerade, children's and work songs, and Carnival music.

Until the late 1950s, the Afro-Dominican culture of most of the island was repressed by the colonial government and the influence of the Roman Catholic Church, both of which taught that African-derived music was evil, demonic and uncultured. This perception changed in the mid- to late 20th century, when Afro-Dominican culture came to be celebrated through the work of promoters like Cissie Caudeiron.

== Characteristics ==
Dominica's terrain is rugged, which has fostered distinct regional traditions. The northern, eastern, southern, western and central parts of the island are music areas. The villages of Wesley and Marigot are also unique in their preservation of English language and music rather than the more French-based styles of the rest of the island.

Dominican folk music is an oral tradition, learned informally through watching others perform. As of 1987, most performers of traditional music were either over 50 years old or under 35, which indicates an ongoing revival of previously declining traditions. Music is evaluated based on both characteristics of the music, such as complex syncopated rhythms, as well as social factors, such as the ability of the performers to improvise and respond to their surroundings and to keep the audience excited and participating in the music.

Characteristics of Dominican music include the West African use of call and response singing, clapping as a major part of rhythm and lyrical, dance and rhythmic improvisation. Lyrics are almost all in Dominican Creole French, and are traditionally sung by women (chantwèl), while the instrumental traditions are predominantly practiced by men. Drums, generically known as lapo kabwit, are the most prominent part of Dominica's instrumental tradition.

== Folk music ==
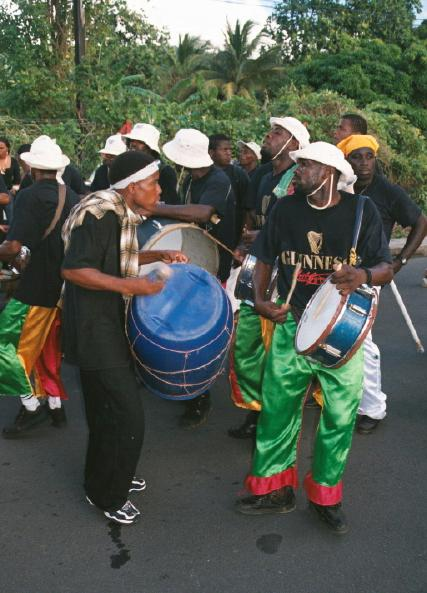
A Dominican drumming band

Dominican folk music includes, most influentially, the French Antillean quadrille tradition, the jing ping style of dance music, as well as bélé and heel-and-toe polka. Traditional Carnival music includes chanté mas and lapo kabwit. Folk music on Dominica has historically been a part of everyday life, including work songs, religious music and secular, recreational music.

The quadrille is one of the most important dance of the Dominican folk tradition, which also includes the lancer and distinctive forms of several dances, many of them derived from European styles. The bidjin (biguine), mereng (méringue), sotis (schottische), polka pil (pure polka), vals o vyenn (Viennese waltz) and mazouk (mazurka) are particularly widespread.

=== Bélé ===
Bélé are folk songs of West African origin, traditionally performed recreationally in the evening during the full moon, and more rarely, lavèyé (wakes). The bélé tradition has declined in the 20th and 21st century, but is still performed for holidays like Easter, Independence Day, Christmas, Creole Day (Jounen Kwéyòl) and patron saint festivals held annually in the Parishes of Dominica, especially in the Fèt St.-Pierre and the Fèt St.-Isidore for fishermen and workers respectively.

All bélé are accompanied by an eponymous drum, the tanbou bélé, along with the tingting (triangle) and chakchak (maracas). Bélés start with a lead vocalist (chantwèl), who is followed by the responsorial chorus (lavwa), then a drummer and dancers. Traditional dances revolve around stylized courtship between a male and female dancer, known as the kavalyé and danm respectively. The bélé song-dances include the bélé soté, bélé priòrité, bélé djouba, bélé contredanse, bélé rickety and bélé pitjé.

=== Quadrille ===
The quadrille is a dance form that is an important symbol of French Antillean culture, not just in Dominica, but also Martinique, Guadeloupe and other Francophone islands. Dominican quadrilles are traditionally performed by four sets of couples in subscription picnics or dances, and in private parties. However, the quadrille tradition now only survives at holidays and festivals.

The Dominican quadrille generally has four figures, the pastouwèl, lapoul, lété and latrinitez. Some regions of Dominica, such as Petite Savanne, are home to local variants such as the caristo. Many quadrilles are found across Dominica under a wide variety of names. In addition to the standard quadrille, the lancer is also an important Dominican dance.

Accompaniment for the quadrille is provided by a four-instrument ensemble called a jing ping band.

=== Jing ping ===
Jing Ping is a kind of folk music originated on the slave plantations of Dominica, also known colloquially as an accordion band. In Dominican folk music, jing ping bands accompany a circle dance called the flirtation, as well as the Dominican quadrille.

Jing ping bands are made up of a boumboum (boom pipe), syak or gwaj (scraper-rattle), tambal or tanbou (tambourine) and accordion. The double bass and banjo are also sometimes used. Bamboo flutes led the jing ping ensembles before the 1940s, when accordions were introduced. The Dominican flute tradition declined as a result, despite their additional use in serenades, until being revived after the National Independence Competitions.

=== Chanté mas ===
The chanté mas (masquerade song) tradition is based around pre-calypso Carnival music performed in a responsorial style by partygoers. The Dominican Carnival masquerade lasted for two days of parading through the streets, with a singer dancing backwards in front of the drummer on a tanbou lélé. Chanté mas lyrics are traditionally based on gossip and scandal, and addressed the personal shortcomings of others.

=== Other folk music ===
Dominica's folk musical heritage includes work songs, storytelling, children's music and masquerade songs. Dominican work songs are accompanied by the tambou twavay drum, and are performed by workers while gathering fruit, building roads, fishing, moving a house or sawing wood. Many are responsorial, and are generally short and simple, with the lyrical text and rhythm tying into the work to be accompanied. On modern Dominica, work songs are rarely performed.

The kont, or storytelling, folk tradition of Dominica was focused around entertainment for night-time festivals, funeral wakes and feasts and festivals. Modern kont is mostly performed during major festival competitions. Most kont storytellers work with local traditions, such as legends and history, and provide an ethical or moral message. A one line theme song, often based around a duet between two characters, recurs throughout most kont performances.

Unlike most Dominican folk songs, children's songs and musical games are mostly in English. They were originally in the same Creole as the rest of the island, but have come to be primarily of English, Scottish, and Irish derivation. Children's musical traditions include ring games and circle dances, and music accompanied by thigh-slapping and circle dancing.

== Early popular music ==
Dominican popular music history can be traced back to the 1940s and '50s, when dance bands like the Casimir Brothers and, later, The Swinging Stars, became famous across the island. Their music was a dance-oriented version of many kinds of Caribbean and Latin popular music, such as Cuban bolero, Brazilian samba, the merengue from the Dominican Republic, Trinidadian calypso, and American funk.

By the beginning of the 1960s, calypso and Trinidadian steelpan became the most popular styles of music on Dominica, replacing traditional Carnival music like chanté mas and lapo kabwit. Early recording stars from this era included Swinging Busters, The Gaylords, De Boys an Dem and Los Caballeros, while chorale groups also gained fans, especially Lajenne Etwal, Siflé Montan'y and the Dominica Folk singers. These early popular musicians were aided by the spread of radio broadcasting, beginning with WIDBS and later Radio Dominica.

Of these early popular musicians, a few pioneering the use of native influences. The Gaylords’ hits, such as "Ti Mako", "Pray for the Blackman", "Lovely Dominica" and "Douvan Jo", were either English or the native Creole, (kwéyòl). By the end of the 1960s and beginning of the 1970s, American rock and roll, soul and funk had reached Dominica and left lasting influences. Funky rock-based bands like Voltage Four, Woodenstool and Every Mother's Child became popular.

The first internationally known bands from Dominica were 1970s groups such as Exile One and Grammacks. These bands were the stars of the cadence-lypso scene, which was the first style of Dominican music to become popular across the Caribbean. By the 1980s, however, Martinican zouk and other styles were more popular. In 1988, WCK formed, playing an experimental fusion of cadence-lypso with the island’s jing ping sound. The result became known as bouyon, and has re-established Dominica in the field of popular music.

=== Calypso ===
In the 1960s, calypso and steelband music became very popular and indeed replaced lapo kabwit and chanté mas as the music of carnival, particularly in the capital Roseau. Many of the traditional songs were performed in the new calypso beat. Calypsonians and Calypso Monarch competitions emerged and became extremely popular. Steelbands emerged all around the country. The older musicians and bands had moved on and were replaced by the younger musicians. Bands such as Swinging Stars, The Gaylords, De Boys an Dem, Los Caballeros and Swinging Busters surfaced and began to cut records. The emergence of radio, first WIDBS and later Radio Dominica helped to spread the music.

Calypso has been popular in Dominica since the 1950s; the first Calypso King was crowned in 1959. Popular calypso in Dominica has always been closely associated with steelpan music. The first wave of Dominican steelpan includes such bands as Esso, Shell and Regent, Vauxhall and Old Oak.

=== Cadence (kadans)/compas ===
In the 1970s, a wave of Haitian, mostly musicians, to Dominica and the French Antilles (Guadeloupe and Martinique) brought with them the kadans, a sophisticated form of music that quickly swept the island and helped unite all the former French colonies of the Caribbean by combining their cultural influences. This was followed by mini-jazz like Les Gentlemen, Les Leopards, Les Vikings de Guadeloupe and others.

Later in the decade and into the 1980s, the French Antilles became home to a style of cadence music called cadence-lypso. Gordon Henderson's Exile One innovated this style, as well as turned the mini-jazz combos into guitar-dominated big bands with a full-horn section and the newly arrived synthesizers, paving the way for the success of large groups like Grammacks, Experience 7, among others. Drawing on these influences, the supergroup Kassav' invented zouk and popularized it with hit songs including "Zouk-La-Se Sel Medikaman Nou Ni". Kassav' formed in Paris in 1978.

=== Cadence-lypso ===
The most influential figure in the promotion of Cadence-lypso was the Dominican group Exile One (based on the island of Guadeloupe) that featured mostly the cadence rampa of Haiti and calypso music from the English-speaking Caribbean. It was pushed in the 1970s by groups from Dominica, and was the first style of Dominican music to find international acclaim.

Dominica cadence music has evolved under the influence of Dominican and Caribbean/Latin rhythms, as well as rock and roll, soul, and funk music from the United States. By the end of the 1970s, Gordon Henderson defined Cadence-lypso as "a synthesis of Caribbean and African musical patterns fusing the traditional with the contemporary".

Aside from Exile One, other bands included the Grammacks, Black Roots, Black Machine, Naked Feet, Belles Combo, Mantra, Black Affairs, Liquid Ice, Wafrikai, Midnighte Groovers and Milestone, while the most famous singers included Bill Thomas, Chubby Marc, Gordon Henderson, Linford John, Janet Azouz, Sinky Rabess, Tony Valmond, Jeff Joseph, Mike Moreau and Anthony Gussie. Ophelia Marie is a popular singer of cadence-lypso in the 1980s.

Cadence-lypso was influenced by nationalist movement that espoused Rastafari and Black Power. Many groups performed songs with intensely ideological positions, and much of the repertoire was in the vernacular Creole language.

Gordon Henderson, Exile One's leader and founder, coined the name "Cadence-lypso" in his full band that used a full-horn section and was the first to use the synthesizers in kadans. Many mini-jazz from Haiti and the French Antilles followed this format. The band is considered by some to be one of the pioneers of soca. During the early 1970s, they initiated a fusion of cadence and calypso "Cadence-lypso" that would later become soca music.

Exile One was the most promoted Creole band of the Caribbean. The first to sign a production contract with major label Barclay Records. The first to export kadans music to the four corners of the globe: Japan, the Indian Ocean, Africa, North America, Europe, The Cape Verde islands.

== Recent popular music ==
During the 1980s, cadence-lypso’s popularity declined greatly. Some Dominican performers remained famous, such as Ophelia, a very renowned singer of the period. Popular music during this time was mostly zouk, a style pioneered by the French Antillean band Kassav, who used styles of folk music of Martinique and Guadeloupe. Soca, a kind of Trinidadian music, was also popular at the time, producing bands like Windward Caribbean Kulture. The '80s also saw a rise in popular for jazz and the formation of several jazz bands, while groups like Exile One began exploring tradition rhythms from jing ping and lapo kabwit.

=== Zouk ===
The inspiration for Zouk's style of rhythmic music comes from the Haitian compas, as well as music called cadence-lypso – Dominica cadence popularized by Grammacks and Exile One. Elements of gwo ka, tambour, ti bwa and biguine vidé are prominent in zouk. Though there are many diverse styles of zouk, some commonalities exist. The French Creole tongue of Martinique and Guadeloupe is an important element, and are a distinctive part of the music. Generally, zouk is based around star singers, with little attention given to instrumentalists, and is based almost entirely around studio recordings.

Music authors Charles De Ledesma and Gene Scaramuzzo trace zouk's development to the Guadeloupean gwo ka and Martinican bèlè (tambour and ti bwa) folk traditions. Ethnomusicologist Jocelyn Guilbault, however, describes zouk as a synthesis of Caribbean popular styles, especially Dominica cadence-lypso, Haitian cadence, Guadeloupean biguine. Zouk arose in the late 1970s and early 1980s, using elements of previous styles of Antillean music, as well as imported genres.

=== Zouk-love ===
Zouk Love is the French Antilles cadence or compas, characterized by a slow, soft and sexual rhythm. The lyrics of the songs often speak of love and sentimental problems.

The music kizomba from Angola and cabo-love from Cape Verde are also derivatives of this French Antillean compas style, which sounds basically the same, although there are notable differences once you become more familiar with these genres. A main exponent of this subgenre is Ophelia Marie of Dominica. Other Zouk Love artists come from the French West Indies, the Netherlands, and Africa.

Grammacks, Exile One, Ophelia Marie, and many Dominican bands played cadence-lypso (Dominica Kadans) that later influenced zouk love in the French Antilles. Nowadays, zouk-love is called the French Antilles cadence or compas. Popular artists include French West Indian artists Edith Lefel and Nichols, or like Netherlands-based Suzanna Lubrano and Gil Semedo, the African artist Kaysha.

=== Soca ===
The calypsonian Lord Shorty of Trinidad was the first to define his music as "soca" during 1975 when his hit song “Endless Vibrations” was causing major musical waves on radio stations and at parties and clubs not just throughout his native T&T but also in far off metropolitan cities like New York, Toronto and London. Soca was originally spelled Sokah which stands for the “Soul of Calypso” with the “kah” part being taken from the first letter in the Sanskrit alphabet and representing the Power of movement as well as the East Indian rhythmic influence that helped to inspire the new soca beat. Shorty stated in a number of interviews that the idea for the new soca beat started with the rhythmic fusion of Calypso rhythms with East Indian rhythms that he used in his hit "Indrani" recorded in 1972. The soca beat was solidified as the popular new beat that most of the T&T Calypso musicians would start adopting by the time Shorty had recorded his big crossover hit “Endless Vibrations” in 1974.

Shorty also recorded a mid-year album in 1975 called “Love In The Caribbean” that contains a number of crossover soca tracks before setting off on an album distribution and promotion tour. During his 1975 “Love In The Caribbean” album promotion and distribution tour Shorty pass thru the isle of Dominica on his way back to Trinidad and saw Dominica's top band Exile One perform at the Fort Young Hotel. Shorty was inspired to compose and record a Soca and Cadence-lypso fusion track called “E Pete” or “Ou Petit” which can be viewed as the first of its kind in that particular Soca style. Shorty sought and got help with the Creole lyrics he used in the chorus of his “E Pete” song by consulting with Dominica's 1969 Calypso King, Lord Tokyo, and two creole lyricists, Chris Seraphine and Pat Aaron while he was in Dominica. The song “E Pete” thus contains genuine Creole lyrics in the chorus like "Ou dee moin ou petit Shorty" (meaning "you told me you are small Shorty"), and is a combination of Soca, Calypso, Cadence-lypso and Creole.

Shorty's 1974 Endless Vibrations and Soul of Calypso brought Soca to regional and international attention and fame and helped to solidify the rapidly growing Soca Movement led by Shorty.

Soca developed in the early 1970s and grew in popularity in the late 1970s. Soca's development as a musical genre included its early fusion of calypso with Indian musical instruments, particularly the dholak, tabla and dhantal, as demonstrated in Lord Shorty's classic compositions "Ïndrani", "Kalo Gee Bull Bull" and "Shanti Om".

=== Bouyon ===
Bouyon is a fusion of Jing ping, Cadence-lypso and traditional dances namely bèlè, Quadrille, chanté mas and lapo kabwit, Mazurka, Zouk and other styles of Caribbean music, developed by a band called Windward Caribbean Kulture (later WCK). WCK was among the most prominent of '80s Dominican soca bands. They began using native drum rhythms such as lapo kabwit and elements of the music of jing ping bands, as well as ragga-style vocals. Bouyon is popular across the Caribbean, and is known as jump up music in Guadeloupe and Martinique.

The best-known band in the genre was Windward Caribbean Kulture "WCK" in 1988 by experimenting a fusion of Jing Ping and Cadence-lypso. While the Cadence-lypso sound is based on the creative usage of acoustic drums, an aggressive up-tempo guitar beat, and strong social commentary in the local Creole language, this new music created by the "WCK" band focused more on the use of modern technology with strong emphasis on keyboard rhythmic patterns.

Bouyon has diversified into multiple subgenres. These include bouyon soca, bouyon-muffin, reketeng, and bouyon gwada.

=== Bouyon soca ===
Bouyon soca, sometimes referred to as Jump up soca, is a fusion genre that typically blends old bouyon rhythms from the '90s and soca music. Bouyon soca is a term coined by non-Dominican producers and musicians, mainly from St Lucia, who embrace both Soca from Trinidad and Bouyon music from Dominica and so find it natural to produce blends of both music genres. Bouyon is a music genre that originated in Dominica that is distinguishable from its older "colleague" Soca.

In Dominica while there may have been the occasional fusions, bouyon has always maintained a very clear, recognizable and different style from soca. Outside of Dominica the Bouyon Soca fusion style is popular in islands like Antigua, Saint Lucia, Guadeloupe and Martinique and is a natural evolution from Zouk and Soca fusions that were popular there during the 1980s.

WCK's "Conch Shell"
WCK (Windward Caribbean Kulture) is one of the most prominent popular musicians of Dominica, and has performed styles such as bouyon and soca.

== Alternative music ==
Religious music, influenced by American gospel, has become an important part of Dominican popular music in the 1990s. Calypso has also retained much popularity in Dominica, as has Jazz. The band Impact has fused jazz with Caribbean music. Other styles include steelpan, which has declined popularity despite the efforts of groups like Dancehall.

== Music institutions and festivals ==
The Caribbean Carnival is an important part of Dominican culture. Originally featuring masquerade songs (chanté mas) and other local traditions, traditional Carnival, Mas Domnik, came to be dominated by imported calypso music and steel bands in the early 1960s; calypso appealed to Carnival-goers because the lyrical focus on local news and gossip was similar to that of chanté mas, despite a rhythmic pattern and instrumentation which contrast sharply with traditional Dominican Mas Domnik music. After a fire in 1963, the traditional Carnival was banned, though calypso and steelpan continued to grow in popularity. Modern Carnival on Dominica takes place on the Monday and Tuesday before Ash Wednesday, and is a festive occasion during which laws against libel and slander are suspended. The modern Dominican Carnival is heavily based on the Trinidadian celebration, but is not as commercialized due to a lack of corporate sponsorship.

The World Creole Music Festival takes place on the island of Dominica, in Festival City, Roseau, which is run by the governmental Dominica Festivals Commission. The National Independence Competitions are an important part of Dominican musical culture. They were founded by Chief Minister of Dominica Edward Olivier Leblanc in 1965, and promote the traditional music and dance of Dominica. The government of Dominica also promotes Dominican music through the Dominican Broadcasting Station, which broadcasts between 20% and 25% local music as a matter of policy.
