= World Creole Music Festival =

Music festival in Dominica

The World Creole Music Festival (WCMF) is an annual three-day music festival hosted on the island of Dominica during the final weekend in October, as a conclusion to Creole heritage month. WCMF was launched to promote Dominican tourism and create a platform for indigenous Dominican music. WCMF is a noted festival of Dominica, and it provides entertainment dedicated to the advancement of global Creole culture and music.

The festival begins on the last Friday in October each year. Entertainers from the Caribbean, French Antilles, Africa and North America attend. WCMF is part of a three-week festival that also features the Cadence-Lypso Competition and Creole In The Park.

== About ==
The festival has focused on musical genres with roots in various forms of musical fusion from various countries of the Creole-speaking world. At its core, the festival hosts a number of Bouyon artists, a percussion focused genre which was created by Dominican Cornell Phillip and his brothers. Other genres are showcased at the festival, including Cadence-lypso, Konpa, Zouk, Soukous, and Zydeco - a genre developed in the US state of Louisiana. Most genres have French, English or Creole lyrics, with styles derived from African, Caribbean and European folk and dance music.

The festival is noted for building regional cooperation and network capabilities in tourism, culture, and entertainment while catering to over 10,000 patrons, one hundred international and regional media partners and about of twenty cultural and musical acts each year, with the number of artists growing each year. In 2025, approximately 7,000 attendees from outside of Dominica attended the festival.

The festival is managed by the Dominica Festivals Committee (DFC), under the Ministry of Tourism office within the government's cabinet. Within the ministry, Discover Dominica leads all cultural and tourism marketing, with the DFC in charge of the operations of the festival. formerly headed by executive director Claudine Springer from 2014 to 2016, Natalie Clarke from 2012 to 2014, and Val "Young Bull" Cuffy, who had a decade-long tenure in charge of the festival. Cuffy served as a consultant to the DFC through 2016. In 2024, Ayodale Andrew was appointed as the Festivals and Events Manager.

The festival is held at the Windsor Park stadium in Roseau, Dominica. WCMF attracts regional and international media coverage each year, due to its extensive line-up and coincidence with the country's Creole Heritage celebrations.

== History ==
The festival began in 1997 during International Creole Month, October. The festival was introduced to highlight the unique music of the island and promote tourism, particularly lagging tourist arrivals during the island's Independence celebrations. The event coincides with Dominica Independence Day on November 3. WCMF is dubbed "The Festival That Never Sleeps" because of its evening kickoffs which last into the early morning.

== Performances ==
The World Creole Music Festival has played host to Creole entertainers including Kassav', Tabou Combo, Exile One, Gramacks/New Generation, WCK, Triple Kay Global, T-Vice, First Serenade, Zouk Machine, Magnum Band, Zin, Taxi Creole, Carimi, Ophelia Marie, Michele Henderson, Tanya St. Val, Sakis, and Francky Vincent.

In 2026, American artist Ne-Yo was announced to headline, alongside Trinidad and Tobago's Machel Montano, the UK's reggae singer Maxi Priest. Other artists such as Fridayy, Les Aiglons, Jean-Marc Ferdinand, Maurane Voyer from Martinique, Diblo Dibala, Full Blown, V’ghn, the DYP Band featuring Shemmy J, Tall Boy, Sedale, Hollywood HP, Nerdy, Andrew Biscuit and Ezra D’Funmachine from Saint Lucia will perform Creole and Caribbean music.

Many of the performers slated to perform at the festival also attend or give performances at secondary events throughout the city in the days before and after the festival as a part of the independence celebrations.

== Notable years ==
=== 2016 World Creole Music Festival ===
In September 2015, the festival's scheduled events for October of that year were cancelled due to Tropical Storm Erika. The storm devastated the island, but the festival was able to return in June 2016. Under the guidance of then Executive Director Claudine Springer, the festival launched live on television across the Caribbean, in the US, and via the web portals of the Discover Dominica Authority, the tourism board of the country, for remote viewing. The festival blended Caribbean culture with diverse musical styles.

Timaya, Midnite Groovers, Kreyol La, Original Bouyon Pioneers, La Grand Mechant Zouk, Popcaan, Triple Kay International, Ophelia, Extasy, Dédé St. Prix, Morgan Heritage, Kes The Band & Mr. Killa, Wyclef Jean, WCK, Breve, T-Micky, Gentleman, Michele Henderson, Asa Bantan and Akon comprised the official lineup of the 19th edition of the festival.

Following the festival's 19th edition, in August 2016, Springer resigned abruptly. The festival was then slated for 2017 in a new venue, and with an updated program.
