= Dominican music =

Dominican music may refer to:

- Music of the Dominican Republic
- Music of Dominica
