= Gilles Floro =

French singer

Gilles Floro (born in Guadeloupe April 18, 1964 – died in Gourbeyre, Guadeloupe June 22, 1999), was a popular French Antillean zouk love singer.
