= Kreyol La =

Haitian compas band

- Origin: Pétion-Ville, Haiti
- Genre: Compas
- Years active: 2005–present
- Label: Para Music Group
- Members: T-Jo Zenny; Stanley Hérissé; Fabrice Fombrun; Antonio Guillaune

Kreyol La (often stylized as Kreyōl La) is a Haitian compas band. The group has performed throughout the world, most notably in the Caribbean, Canada, France and the United States through various concerts, carnivals, and festivals.

== History ==
Kreyol La was founded in January 2005 after the disbandment of Konpa Kreyol. When keyboardist David Dupoux started his own band with Mikaben called Krezi Mizik, the rest of Konpa Kreyol led by Tjo Zenny became Kreyol La. Initially, Kreyol La was much less sophisticated than its predecessor, imploring a sound that was closer to the street culture of Port-au-Prince but paved the way for it in becoming a key contributor to the electronic scene of the New Generation of Compas. Since March 2008, after an experience with drum machines, Kreyol La has been retooled in evolving into a “full band” format, harmonizing the keyboards, guitar, bass, drums and percussion of old that drew closer to the sounds of Konpa Kreyol. Until the release of Invictus in 2015, it arguably has become one of the more sophisticated album release to date while making the case for exceeding the musical direction of Konpa Kreyol.

== Members ==
Current

- Tjo Zenny – lead vocals (2005–)
- Stanley Hérissé – bassist and musical director
- Fabrice Fombrun – keyboard
- Antonio Guillaune – drummer

Former

- Joubert Charles – manager (2005–2010; deceased, 2010 Haiti earthquake)
- Ti Ansyto – vocals (2005–2014)
- Vladmir Alexis – drummer (2005–2014)

== Discography ==
Studio albums

- Viktwa (2006)
- Evolution (2010)
- Invictus (2015)
- Domination (2018)
- Emotion (2020)
