= Jocelyne Guilbault =

Canadian ethnomusicologist and popular music scholar

- Born: Quebec, Canada
- Education: Université de Montréal; University of Michigan
- Occupations: Ethnomusicologist, Professor
- Years active: 1980–present
- Employer: University of California, Berkeley
- Notable work: Governing Sound: The Cultural Politics of Trinidad’s Carnival Musics

Jocelyne Guilbault is a Canadian ethnomusicologist and professor of music at the University of California, Berkeley. She is known for her research on Caribbean music, popular music studies, and the politics of representation in postcolonial societies, particularly in the West Indies.

== Early life and education ==
Guilbault was born in Quebec, Canada. She received her bachelor’s and master’s degrees from the Université de Montréal before earning her Ph.D. from the University of Michigan.

== Academic career ==
Guilbault began her teaching career at the University of Ottawa in 1984, where she worked until 1998. Since 1999, she has been a professor at the University of California, Berkeley. Her research and teaching focus on critical theoretical and methodological issues in ethnomusicology and popular music studies. She emphasizes a multidisciplinary approach, drawing from music, anthropology, cultural studies, and history.

Her research is deeply informed by the history of the West Indies, where she has explored topics such as colonial legacies, diasporic formations, national identities, and the politics of representation. In her work, Guilbault highlights the creative agency of musicians, audiences, and music industry workers in confronting and resisting power structures.

== Research and publications ==
Guilbault's early fieldwork examined the politics of traditionality and modernity in the village music of Saint Lucia. Her later work on Zouk music expanded these themes on a global scale, and she has since focused extensively on Trinidad's calypso and soca music scenes. Guilbault's publications explore the intersections of music, governance, and market forces in postcolonial societies.

Her notable works include:

- Governing Sound: The Cultural Politics of Trinidad’s Carnival Musics (2007)
- Roy Cape: A Life on the Calypso and Soca Bandstand (2014), co-authored with Roy Cape
- Zouk: World Music in the West Indies (1993)
- Sounds of Vacation: Political Economies of Caribbean Tourism (2019), co-edited with Timothy Rommen

== Awards ==
In May 2025, she was awarded an Honorary Doctorate from McGill University for her groundbreaking contributions to ethnomusicology and popular music studies.
