= The Wizzard =

The Wizzard (born Merlin St. Hilaire) is a calypso musician from Dominica. He began performing in church as a young man, then competed in the carnival calypso tent in 1988, placing second. In 1989, he won the competition with "Feed My Brother" and "Young an' Restless"; that year, he also placed second at the Independence Calypso competition. He retained his Calypso King title in 1990, as well as placing second representing Dominica at the Caribbean Broadcasting Union Song Festival.
