= Akiyo =

- Gender: Female

Origin
- Origin: Japanese
- Meaning: Different meanings depending on the kanji used

Akiyo (written: 明代, 啓代 or 聡生) is a feminine Japanese given name. Notable people with the name include:

- Akiyo Asaki (朝木 明代; 1944–1995), Tokyo councilwoman who died under mysterious circumstances
- Akiyo Nishiura (西浦 聡生; born 1983), Japanese mixed martial artist and kickboxer
- Akiyo Noguchi (野口 啓代; born 1989), Japanese rock climber
