= Claude Germany =

French Antillean musician

- Origin: Martinique
- Genre: Chouval bwa

Claude Germany is a French Antillean musician, known as a player of chouval bwa.
