= Marce et Tumpak =

Marcé et Toumpak
- Origin: Martinique
- Genre: Chouval bwa

Marce et Tumpak is a Martinican pop band that uses elements of both traditional and modern music. Their instrumentation includes folk drums like the tibwa and ka, as well as a wooden flute. The lead singer is Marce (né Bernard Pago).
