= Lewoz =

Lewoz are the traditional rural musical performances in Martinique and Guadeloupe, as opposed to the modernized gwo ka moderne.

== See also ==
- Music of Martinique and Guadeloupe
