= Cadence-lypso =

French Caribbean music genre

- Stylistic origins: Cadence rampa; calypso
- Cultural origins: Early 1970s, Dominica, Guadeloupe
- Derivative forms: Zouk; bouyon

Fusion genres
- Kizomba; coladeira; kuduro; reggaeton

Cadence-lypso is a fusion of cadence rampa from Haiti, Jazz, Blues and calypso from Trinidad and Tobago that has also spread to other English speaking countries of the Caribbean. Originated in the 1970s by the Dominican band Exile One, it spread and became popular in the dance clubs around the Creole world and Africa as well as the French Antilles.

Gordon Henderson is the leader and founder of Exile One, and the one who coined the term cadence-lypso.

== History ==
Dominican contemporary music, that is the music played by the dance bands from the 1950s, has played a very important role in Dominica national life. Dominica musical landscape has seen many changes in the intervening period from 1950. In the forties and fifties, there were bands such as the Casimir Brothers of Roseau. The Swinging Stars emerged at the end of the fifties. Their music was a dance-oriented version of many kinds of Caribbean and Latin popular music.

By the beginning of the 1960s, calypso and Trinidadian steelpan became the most popular styles of music on Dominica, replacing traditional Carnival music like chanté mas and lapo kabwit, particularly in the capital Roseau. Many of the traditional carnival songs were performed in the new calypso beat. Calypsonians and calypso monarch competitions emerged and became extremely popular. It was in the 1960s that the trend towards drawing on original music, traditional music and songs of Dominica began. This was probably best exemplified by the music of the Gaylords and to a lesser extent, De Boys and Dem. Gaylords unleashed a string of hits such as "DouvanJou", "Ti Mako", songs in Dominican Creole French as well as powerful nationalist songs in English, as "Lovely Dominica" and "Pray for the Blackman". These songs were performed to calypso rhythms and later the new reggae beat coming out of Jamaica.

Early recording stars from this era included Swinging Busters, The Gaylords, De Boys an Dem and Los Caballeros, while chorale groups also gained fans, especially Lajenne Etwal, Siflé Montan'y and the Dominica folk singers. These early popular musicians were aided by the spread of radio broadcasting, beginning with WIDBS and later Radio Dominica. The emergence of radio, first WIDBS and later Radio Dominica helped to spread the music.

In the late 1960s and early 1970s, the influence of rock, soul and funk music from the United States was reflected in Dominican contemporary dance music. New groups originating mainly from the high school student population emerged. Groups such as Every Mother's Child, Woodenstool and Voltage Four specialized in rock and funk. The Latin-rock music of Carlos Santana and Afro-rock music of Osibisa became powerful influences on younger bands, and were very popular in the dance halls.

=== The Cadence era ===
In the early 1960s, Haitian musicians introduced to the Caribbean, specifically, Dominica and the French Antilles (Guadeloupe and Martinique) the cadence rampa or méringue, a sophisticated form of music that quickly swept the islands and helped unite all the former French colonies of the Caribbean by combining their cultural influences.

In the early 1970s, the Dominican Kadans band Exile One was born, based on the island of Guadeloupe. Its members were top rate Dominican musicians originating from bands such as Woodenstool, Voltage and De Boys and Dem. Trinidadian Calypso and Haitian kadans or méringue were the two dominants music styles of Dominica so Exile One, that featured calypso, reggae and mostly kadans or méringue, called its music Cadence-lypso however, most of the bands repertoire was kadans.

Due to the popularity of Exile One, There was a virtual explosion of kadans bands from Dominica - Grammacks, Liquid Ice, Midnight Groovers, Black Affairs, Black Machine, Mantra, Belles Combo, Milestone, Wafrikai, Black roots, Black Blood, Naked Feet and Mammouth among others. Leading vocalists of the period include Gordon Henderson, Jeff Joseph, Marcel "Chubby" Marc, Anthony Gussie, Mike Moreau, Tony Valmond, Linford John, Bill Thomas, SinkyRabess and Janet Azouz among others. Dominica kadans bands became popular in Martinique, Guadeloupe, Haiti and other islands in the Caribbean, Latin America and Africa.

The music of Santana and Osibisa also influenced this new form as evidenced in the use of guitars, keyboards, horns and percussion. At that time too, the society was in nationalist ferment. The Black Power and Rastafarian Movements, with their black pride, pro-African and anti-colonial ideological positions, influenced the young musicians tremendously. This was reflected in the music in terms of band names such as Wafrikai, Black Machine, Black Roots, Black Affairs and Black Blood, a definitive identification with blackness, with Africa. This was reflected in the melody, in the use of certain instruments such as keyboards, guitars and horns. This was also reflected in lyrical content, the positive, nationalist and social commentary of cadence-lypso. Cadence-lypso reflected and exuded the nationalist ferment of the seventies.

There were a number of other important aspects of cadence-lypso music which impacted on our culture and society as well as the future direction of Dominica's contemporary music. Cadence-lypso used the Creole language as its prime means of expression, again feeding into our language traditions and our folk song traditions. Oral traditions such as proverbs were every much utilized in the music. Cadence-music was popular among the young and the old and united the generations. For the younger people, this music which was making Dominica famous overseas was also serving as a platform of protest against the ills of society and for conscious-raising. This music was popular among the older folk because of its similarity or relationship to rhythms of jing ping music and the use of the Creole language.

During the 1980s, cadence-lypso popularity declined greatly. Some Dominican performers remained famous, such as Ophelia, and became Dominica's first kadans female singer to achieve international star status. She is sometimes referred to as "Dominica's Lady of Song", the "First Lady of Creole", and "la grande dame de la musique Antillaise". She has toured widely in France and had concerts broadcast over much of the Francophone world. Her first recording was "Ay Dominique," a "lament for Dominica as the country underwent political problems in the 1970s". When the record was released, it immediately became a hit in Guadeloupe and Martinique although this was towards the end of the dominance of Dominican music in the French West Indies.

Recently, efforts have begun to revitalize cadence-lypso and Creole music generally through the holding of the World Creole Music Festival in Dominica. This festival attracts top bands of the French Creole-speaking world and in Africa. Exile One, Jeff Joseph//new Generation Grammacks, Anthony Gussie and Tony Valmond/Liquid Ice have released a number of albums as well as remastered vintage cadence hits of the 1970s.

== Origin ==
The most influential figure in the development of Cadence-lypso was the Dominican group Exile One (based on the island of Guadeloupe) that combined calypso music from the English speaking Caribbean and the cadence rampa of Haiti with influences of Dominican traditional music.

Cadence-lypso came from calypso from Trinidad and cadence rampa from Haiti, with influences from jing ping, the Dominican traditional music.

Cadence-lypso has evolved under the influence of Dominican and Caribbean/Latin rhythms, as well as rock guitars, soul-style vocals and funk bass and horn styles - music from the United States. By the end of the 1970s, Gordon Henderson defined Cadence-lypso as "a synthesis of Caribbean and African musical patterns fusing the traditional with the contemporary". It was pushed in the 1970s by groups from Dominica, and was the first style of Dominican music to find international acclaim. Cadence-lypso was instrumental in the evolution of soca and zouk music in the Caribbean and the French West Indies.

Aside from Exile One, other bands included the Grammacks, Black Roots, Black Machine, Naked Feet, Belles Combo, Mantra, Black Affairs, Liquid Ice, Wafrikai, Midnight Groovers, Bill-O-Men and Milestone, while the most famous singers included Bill Thomas, Chubby Marc, Gordon Henderson, Linford John, Janet Azouz, Sinky Rabess, Tony Valmond, Jeff Joseph, Mike Moreau and Anthony Gussie. Ophelia Marie is a popular singer of cadence-lypso in the 1980s.

Cadence-lypso was influenced by nationalist movement that espoused Rastafari and Black Power. Many groups performed songs with intensely ideological positions, and much of the repertoire was in the vernacular Creole language.

== Women in Cadence ==
Cadence, from its conception and through time, has classically been a male-dominated genre. Ophelia Marie is a popular singer of cadence-lypso from Dominica in the 1980s. She is sometimes referred to as "Dominica's Lady of Song", the "First Lady of Creole", and "la grande dame de la musique Antillaise".

Ophelia emerged and became Dominica's first kadans female singer to achieve international star status. She is considered to be the "Godmother of Cadence", and has toured widely in France and had concerts broadcast over much of the Francophone world. Her first recording was "Ay Dominique," a "lament for Dominica as the country underwent political problems in the 1970s". The song became a popular anthem among Dominicans, and she began recording with Gordon Henderson, placing herself at the forefront of cadence-lypso. Ophelia's contribution to the development of regional music, particularly cadence, is well known, ever since she burst onto the music scene in 1979 with her popular hit "Aie Dominique" and later "Chante d'amour".

She often sung about women's issues, a rarity at the time, and was among the first women to sing at the Théâtre Noir, Cirque d'Hiver and the Théâtre de la Renaissance. She was the first non-French winner of the Maracas d'Or Award from Société Pernod, and has been awarded International Women's Year in 1985, the Sisserou Award of Honour (the second highest award in Dominica), a Lifetime Award in 2005 and a Golden Drum Award in 1984. In 2005, Ophelia hosted the fifth Dynamith d'Or Caribbean Music Awards. She has inspired CHS's own Charmed Simplicity "BIG UP"

== NCCU cadence-lypso competition ==
The NCCU launched its Cadence-lypso Show/Competition June 20, 2012 at 10:00am at its head offices in Roseau. Mr. Leroy Charles, NCCU Cadence-lypso Show promoter, presented the background of Cadence-lypso and applauded NCCU for taking the step to preserve Dominica's indigenous music.

NCCU President, Mr. Dexter Ducreay stated that NCCU took this initiative to give back to Dominica and keep the Cadence art form alive. Fifteen individuals and groups will be selected to compete at the show at the Newtown Savannah. The winner will walk away with an attractive prize of $15,000. Inspiring addresses were also delivered by Honourable Justina Charles, Minister of Culture, Youth and Sports. Honourable Ian Douglas, Minister for Tourism and Legal Affairs and Chief Cultural Officer, Mr. Raymond Lawrence. They all confirmed support for the show. The various media houses were also present as partners in this Cadence Show venture. The show was held at the Newtown Savannah and was well-attended by Cadence lovers who danced and grooved to the infectious music, which comprised old school and new fusions of the Cadence-lypso beat. The show was organised by the NCCU as part of efforts to revitalise Cadence and to help develop and expose young talent in keeping with the International Year of Cooperatives 2012.

== See also ==
- Caribbean music
- Calypso music
- Cadence rampa (kadans)
- Music of Dominica
- Music of Guadeloupe
- World Creole Music Festival
