= Ophelia Marie =

Dominican singer (born 1951)

- Born: 28 March 1951 (age 75); Willemstad, Curaçao
- Origin: Dominica
- Genres: Lypo; Cadence-lypso; Zouk; World music
- Years active: Late 1970s – present
- Members: Ophelia Marie

Ophelia Marie, also known as Ophelia Olivaccé-Marie (born 28 March 1951), is a popular singer of cadence-lypso from Dominica in the 1980s. She is sometimes referred to as "Dominica's Lady of Song", the "First Lady of Creole", and "la grande dame de la musique Antillaise".

Ophelia emerged and became Dominica's first Lypo female singer to achieve international star status. She is considered to be the "Godmother of Cadence", and has toured widely in France and had concerts broadcast over much of the Francophone world.

Her signature tune is "Aie Dominique", which was also her first recording, and became an iconic anthem for Dominicans. Ophelia's musical idol is the South African singer Miriam Makeba

== Biography ==
Born in Willemstad, Curaçao to Dominican parents, Ophelia grew to appreciate music from a very young age as a result of her father's musical prowess. At the age of 9 she moved to the village of Pointe Michel, Dominica, where she attended the St. Luke's Primary School. As a young girl, she was part of a group called the "Five O's", which performed at church functions.

Her husband and manager, McCarthy Marie, encouraged her to start her solo career. Her first recording was "Aie Dominique," a "lament for Dominica as the country underwent political problems in the 1970s". The song became a popular anthem among Dominicans, and she began recording with Gordon Henderson, placing herself at the forefront of cadence-lypso. Her debut recording album was the self-titled "Ophelia", which went on to sell 100,000 copies.

She has often sung about women's issues, a rarity at the time, and was among the first women to sing at the Théâtre Noir, Cirque d’Hiver and the Théâtre de la Renaissance. She was the first non-French winner of the Maracas d’Or Award from Société Pernod, and has been awarded International Women's Year in 1985, the Sisserou Award of Honour (the second highest award in Dominica), a Lifetime Award in 2005 and a Golden Drum Award in 1984. In 2005, Ophelia hosted the fifth Dynamith d'Or Caribbean Music Awards. She has inspired CHS's own Charmed Simplicity "BIG UP".

== Education ==
1957–64	St. Luke’s Primary School, Pointe Michel, Dominica
1964–69	Convent High School, Roseau, Dominica
1972–75	University of the West Indies, Cave Hill, Barbados

DEGREES:
1975	BA (General), University of the West Indies, Cave Hill, Barbados
1977	Commonwealth Youth Programme Diploma in Advanced Youth Work, University of Guyana
1984	Certificate in Theory of Music, Grade IV, Kairi School of Music, Roseau, Dominica

== Career ==
1975	French Teacher, Dominica Grammar School, Roseau, Dominica (1975–76)
1988	Chief Cultural Officer, Cultural Division, Old Mill Cultural Centre, Canefield (1988–89)
1993	Coordinator ENCORE Project (1993–95)
2001	Deputy Director of Tourism, National Development Corporation, Roseau, Dominica (2001–06)

== Works ==
ALBUMS
1979	Ophelia
1981	Chanson d'Amour
1982	Live in Paris
1983	Emigration
1986	Trahison
1990	Love Vibrations
1991	Special
1992	Vengeance
1994	L'anmou, L'anmou
1996	Dominica Ahead
1997	Best of Ophelia
2001	Noel Oh
2005	Hypnotique

SINGLE
1980	Gloria and Magnifcat

VIDEO ALBUM
1992	Dominica Sweet

== Awards ==
Year	Award
1981	Maracas d'Or award, Société Pernod, France
1984	Golden Drum award, Dominica
1985	Prominent Women's award, Dominica
1986	Award for Musical Fortitude, Sint Maarten
1996	FAME Lifetime Award, Dominica
1998	Most Outstanding Female Vocalist, FAME Awards, Dominica
1999	Sisserou Award of Honour, Dominica
2003	Award for Outstanding Contribution to Creole Music, Dominica Festival Committee, Dominica
2005	Lifetime Award, Cable and Wireless, Dominica
2006	Caribbean Cultural Icon award, CARIFESTA IX, Port of Spain, Trinidad

== See also ==
- Music of Dominica
