= Cadence rampa =

Dance music genre

- Native name: Kadans, kadans ranpa
- Other names: Cadence
- Stylistic origins: Méringue
- Cultural origins: Early 1960s, Haiti

Regional scenes
- North America (esp. Haiti, French West Indies, Dominica, Trinidad and Tobago, Canada and Panama); Europe (esp. France and Portugal); Africa (esp. Cape Verde and Angola); South America (esp. Brazil)

Cadence rampa (Haitian Creole: kadans ranpa, [kadãs ɣãpa]), or simply kadans, is a dance music and modern méringue popularized in the Caribbean by the virtuoso Haitian sax player Webert Sicot in the early 1960s. Cadence rampa was one of the sources of cadence-lypso. Cadence and compas are two names for the same Haitian modern méringue.

== Ethnology ==
Cadence rampa literally means rampart rhythm.

== History ==
Webert Sicot left Nemours Jean-Baptiste's compas band and called his music cadence to differentiate it from compas especially when he took it abroad, and so the rivalry between Sicot and Nemours created these names. Sicot created a new rhythm, cadence rampa, to counter compas, but it was only in a spirit of competition. The rhythm of cadence rampa was identical to compas except for the addition of the second drum that sounded on every fourth beat.

In the 1930s several biguine artists from Martinique and Guadeloupe moved to France, where they achieved great popularity in Paris, especially in the wake of the colonial exhibition in 1931. Early stars like Alexandre Stellio and Sam Castandet became popular in Paris. Between the 1930s and 1950s, the dance beguine was popular among the islands' dance orchestras. Its popularity abroad died relatively quickly, but it lasted as a major force in popular music in Martinique and Guadeloupe until Haitian cadence and compas took over in the 1950s. In the later part of the 20th century, biguine musicians like clarinet virtuoso Michel Godzom helped revolutionize the genre. The signature sound of the biguine is the interplay between the clarinet and trombone, both solo and as a duet, which can still be heard today throughout Antilles music, from the most traditional forms like cadence or the pop sounds of today's zouk.

The Sicot brothers, Maestro Webert Sicot and composer Raymond Sicot, are well regarded in the Caribbean for their rigorous harmonic skills. They introduced the méringue-cadence to the Caribbean, specifically the French Antilles of Martinique and Guadeloupe around 1962, from where it spread to Dominica. From the 60s to the 70s, Dominica, Guadeloupe and Martinique were replete with cadence bands like Selecta, La Perfecta, Les Aiglons, Grammacks, Exile One, Les Vikings de Guadeloupe, and Abel Zenon et son combo.

== Style ==
Cadence music is characterized by a constant uptempo rhythm, hence the name cadence. Its percussive aspect comes from the drum (in particular, the steady one-beat bass drum), an accentuated use of cymbals and, to a lesser extent, the high hat plus a distinct beat of the cowbell, tok, to-tok, tok-tok-tok, and a conga drum beating a dash of méringue.

== See also ==
- Cadence-lypso
- Caribbean music
- Méringue
- Music of Dominica
- Music of Guadeloupe
- Music of Haiti
- Music of Martinique
