= Gramacks =

Cadence-lypso group from Dominica

Grammacks
- Origin: Saint-Joseph, Dominica
- Genres: Kadans; Cadence-lypso; World music
- Years active: 1970 – 1985
- Members: Jeff Joseph; Georges Thomas; Curvin Anthony Serrant; Anthony George; Elon Rodney; Mc Donald Prosper; Anthony Pierre; Bill Thomas

Gramacks (or "Les Gramacks", also spelled with two Ms) was a cadence-lypso group from Dominica.

== Biography ==
The band is from Saint-Joseph, a village from Dominica. The group was formed in 1970, after a band from Roseau failed to show up to perform at the village. The founding members were Anthony "Curvin" Serrant (lead guitar), Anthony "Tetam" George (bass guitar), Elon "Bolo" Rodney (drums), Alickson JnoBaptiste (lead singer), and Mc Donald "McKie" Prosper (keyboards). Georges "Soul" Thomas (guitar) joined shortly thereafter, and Jeff Joseph eventually replaced JnoBaptiste as lead singer afterwards. Bolo, Mackie, Soul and Joseph were former students of the Dominica Grammar School, while Tetam and Curvin were from St Mary's Academy, hence the name Gramacks. The band did not have instruments initially. Locally, they had their first success in the summer of 1972, at the Harlem Festival in Newtown. The band took out a loan to purchase instruments, but despite performing often, they struggled with repaying the loan.

Joseph went to Guadeloupe to look for opportunities. The Dominican band Exile One were experiencing success in the French-speaking Caribbean – and to a lesser extent in mainland France – with the style cadence-lypso; this encouraged Gramacks to embrace the style and meet the Guadeloupean producer Henri Debs in 1974. With Debs, the band recorded several singles, including "Soukouyant" and "Soliel Tous Chaud", which became hits in the Caribbean. The two bands were influential figures in the promotion of cadence-lypso in the 1970s. They were an inspiration for the French Antilles band Kassav' and the emergence of zouk in the 1980s. The full-horn section kadans band Exile One led by Gordon Henderson, and Gramacks (led by Jeff Joseph) introduced the newly arrived synthesizers to their music that other young cadence or compas bands from Haiti (mini-jazz) and the French Antilles emulated in the 1970s.

Gramacks achieved international fame with Woo Mi Deba (Wooy Mis Debas) – recorded in France in 1976 – which was popular in the Caribbean and France. This allowed them to go on an extensive European tour. In 1977, Gramacks were invited to perform at each stage of the Tour de France. By this point Trinidadian horn player Bill Thomas had joined the band. Thomas recruited fellow Trinidadian Gaby, a saxophonist. In 1979, Gramacks performed at the halftime show of Super Bowl XIII. The group's final album, Roots Caribbean Rock, was released in 1984. Jeff Joseph went solo in 1985. Creative differences and financial mismanagement caused the band to break up with members pursuing individual solo projects.

Jeff Joseph later formed Volt Face with Georges Décimus of Kassav' and singer Dominik Coco. In 1997, Joseph formed Gramacks New Generation, with greater reggae influence, inviting drummer Charles Laube and keyboardists Ras Tea and Christian Moore. Gramacks headlined the first World Creole Music Festival in Dominica in 1997. In 2009, the original members, excluding Joseph, reunited with the release of the album Get Up. Jeff Joseph, aged 57, died on 23 November 2011 after a stroke. He received an official funeral service, with the day declared a national day of mourning.

== Band members ==
- Singer: Jeff Joseph and Georges "Soul" Thomas
- Guitarist: Anthony "Curvin" Serrant
- Bassist: Anthony "Tepam" George
- Drummer: Elon "Bolo" Rodney
- Keyboard player: Mc Donald "Mckie" Prosper
- Trombone player: Anthony "Bone" Pierre 1976-1980
- Trumpet player: Bill "Billo" Thomas 1974-1976

== Discography ==
=== Gramacks ===
- Gramacks
- Symbol of determination in Paris
- Gramacks international
- Woo Mi Deba (1976)
- African connection
- Leurs derniers succès
- Gramacks and Hippomène
- Politik Anthology (1981)
- La vie disco
- Ka allez haut
- International (1977)
- Paroles en bouche pas maître (1977)
- Roots Caribbean Rock (1984)
- The Gramacks featuring Jeff Joseph
- Pa ka gadé douvan
- Creole mix : maxi single
- Party party / Hot music : 2 titres
- Make you dance
- The Gramacks
- Gramacks 1974-1976
- The very best of
- Gramacks Best of
- Gramacks New Collector
- Get Up

=== Gramacks new generation ===
- Gramacks New Generation
- Jeff Joseph and Gramacks New Generation
- Live
- Best of Gramacks New Generation Live
- Live à St Joseph
- Gramacks forever
- Get Up
