= Compas =

Music genre of Haiti

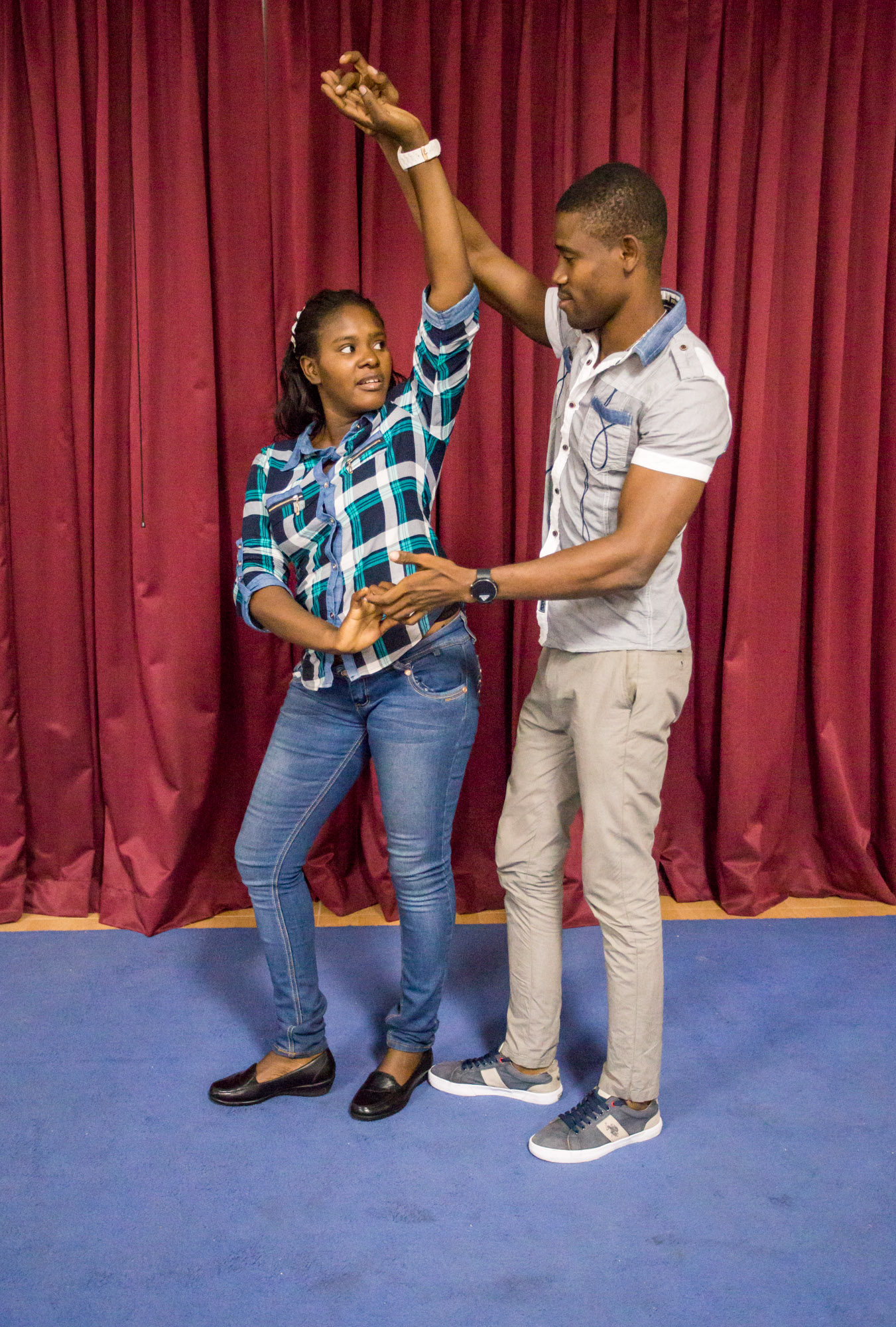
- Dancers performing to Compas music closely, highlighting the genre's intimate style
- Stylistic origins: Méringue
- Cultural origins: 1955, Haiti
- Derivative forms: Cadence rampa; cadence-lypso; zouk; coladeira

Fusion genres
- Champeta; kizomba; soca; reggaeton

Regional scenes
- North America (esp. Haiti, the French West Indies, Dominica, Trinidad and Tobago, Canada, Panama and the Dominican Republic); Portugal; France; South America (esp. Brazil and Colombia)

The Compas of Haiti
- UNESCO Intangible Cultural Heritage
- Country: Haiti
- Reference: 02273
- Region: Latin America and the Caribbean

Inscription history
- Inscription: 2025 (20th session)
- List: Representative

Compas (French pronunciation: [kɔ̃pa]; Haitian Creole: konpa dirèk; French: compas direct), also known as konpa or kompa, is a modern méringue dance music genre of Haiti. The genre was created by Nemours Jean-Baptiste following the creation of Ensemble Aux Callebasses in 1955, which became Ensemble Nemours Jean-Baptiste in 1957. The frequent tours of the many Haitian bands have cemented the style in all the Caribbean. Therefore, compas is the main music of several countries such as Dominica and the French Antilles. Whether it is called zouk, where French Antilles artists of Martinique and Guadeloupe have taken it, or compas in places where Haitian artists have toured, this méringue style is influential in part of the Caribbean, Portugal, Cape Verde, France, part of Canada, and South and North America.

Nemours Jean-Baptiste (1918–1985) was an important figure in the creation and popularization of konpa dirèk. Born in Port-au-Prince, Jean-Baptiste grew up in a musically inclined family, and his early exposure to various forms of music shaped his later innovations. In the 1950s, Haiti's music scene was heavily influenced by traditional meringue, but Jean-Baptiste wanted to modernize this sound by incorporating elements of Latin and jazz music, which were becoming popular across the Caribbean at the time. The Ensemble Aux Callebasses, later became the Ensemble Nemours Jean-Baptiste. His ensemble introduced a new style of meringue with more structured rhythms and harmonic arrangements, characterized by the inclusion of electric guitars, saxophones, and a strong brass section.

Compas blends African, Latin and European influences, reflecting Haiti's cultural heritage resulting from their colonial past. The music's adaptable nature allowed it to break class barriers in Haiti, being embraced by both the elites and working-class communities. As konpa evolved in the 1960s and 1970s, it began to influence other Caribbean genres like Dominican merengue and zouk in the French Antilles, contributing to its international reach. Jean-Baptiste's contributions established konpa as a cornerstone of Haitian cultural identity.

In 2025, Compas was recognized as intangible cultural heritage by UNESCO.

== Etymology and characteristics ==
The word "compas" means "measure" or "rhythm" in Spanish, and one of the most distinctive characteristics of compas is the consistent pulsating tanbou beat, a trait common to many styles of Caribbean music. Compas Direct (which is a trademark registered in the United States by Nemours Jean-Baptiste's heirs Dr Yves Nemours Jean-Baptiste and Mrs. Yvrose Jean-Baptiste) translates as direct beat. In Creole, it is officially spelled as konpa, but it is most popularly spelled with an "m" in place of the "n" (as in kompa) even though it is considered a botched spelling translation that resulted from a phonetic misunderstanding between French and Haitian Creole, the latter with a newly standardized orthography which has only been established since 1979 that contains no m-sounding consonants before b's and p's unlike in French.

== History ==
Konpa (compas) emerged in Haiti during the mid-20th century, a time of significant cultural and political change. The genre was created and popularized by Nemours Jean-Baptiste, who founded Ensemble Aux Callebasses in 1955. Two years later, the group became Ensemble Nemours Jean-Baptiste, solidifying its place in Haitian music history. Before konpa's creation, traditional Haitian meringue dominated the local music scene. However, Jean-Baptiste sought to modernize this style by incorporating elements of Latin and jazz music, which were gaining traction across the Caribbean. This new approach added structure to the rhythms and harmonies, characterized by the use of electric guitars, saxophones, and brass instruments, creating a danceable and accessible sound.

Konpa's rise coincided with the presidency of François "Papa Doc" Duvalier in the late 1950s and 1960s. Duvalier's administration emphasized promoting Haitian culture to foster national unity, and konpa became a symbol of modern Haitian identity. Its rhythm and broad appeal allowed it to remove social barriers, becoming popular among both the Haitian elite and working-class communities. This unique ability to bring people together through music helped konpa cement its place as Haiti's leading musical genre.

As konpa gained popularity in Haiti, it began to spread internationally, especially during the 1960s and 1970s. Haitian immigrants carried the genre to places like the United States, Canada, France, and the Dominican Republic, where it influenced and blended with other styles of music. For example, konpa played a significant role in shaping zouk music in the French Antilles, as well as influencing Dominican merengue. The adaptability of konpa ensured its reach far beyond Haiti's borders, making it an integral part of the Haitian diaspora's cultural identity.

By the 1980s, konpa continued to evolve with the emergence of new styles such as kompa gouyad, a slower, more sensual variation of the genre. Modern bands have further adapted the music to incorporate elements of contemporary genres like reggae, hip-hop, and R&B, keeping konpa relevant for younger generations.

=== Rise in Popularity: Regional Growth ===
In the early 1960s, konpa began spreading beyond Haiti through the efforts of Nemours Jean-Baptiste and other Haitian musicians like Webert Sicot. They toured the Caribbean extensively, visiting countries such as Curaçao, Aruba, Saint Lucia, Dominica, and particularly the French islands of Martinique and Guadeloupe. These tours helped introduce the Caribbean to the sounds of meringue-compas and cadence rampa, styles pioneered in Haiti. Webert Sicot, a saxophonist and creator of cadence rampa, collaborated with producers in Martinique and Guadeloupe, recording multiple albums that further popularized the genre in the region.

As Haitian bands gained popularity in the French Antilles, local musicians began adopting the style, incorporating elements of konpa into their music. Influential groups like Les Guais Troubadours, featuring the singer Louis Lahens, played a key role in teaching Antillean musicians the rhythms of meringue-compas and cadence rampa. This exchange helped create a strong connection between Haiti and the French Antilles, turning konpa into one of the most loved music genres in the region. By the late 1960s, nearly all prominent Haitian bands had performed in these islands, solidifying konpa's influence throughout the Caribbean.

=== Rise in Popularity: Global Expansion ===
In the 1970s and 1980s, konpa reached new heights as Haitian bands toured extensively, gaining fans across the Caribbean, Europe, Africa, and the Americas. Legendary groups such as Tabou Combo, Les Freres Dejean, and Les Shleu-Shleu brought konpa to an international stage. Tabou Combo, in particular, became one of the most recognized konpa bands. Their music gained immense popularity in Panama, where locals embraced konpa as part of their cultural identity, calling it "reggae haitiano." The band's world tours also brought Haitian music to Senegal, Japan, and other countries, earning them global recognition.

During this period, konpa also became a staple in New York City's Haitian community, with performances in venues like Central Park drawing large crowds. Artists like Coupe Cloue, known for his humorous lyrics and laid-back style, expanded konpa's reach to West Africa, where he was crowned "king" during his tours. Meanwhile, groups like Orchestre Septentrional D'Haiti preserved the tradition of large orchestras, representing the northern style of konpa. These tours and performances cemented konpa's status as a global genre, deeply connected to Haiti's culture and diaspora.

As konpa continued to evolve and gain popularity on a global scale, it also underwent significant transformations within Haiti itself. While large orchestras like Orchestre Septentrional upheld the traditional style of konpa, a new wave of smaller, more intimate bands began to emerge. This shift marked the rise of the mini-jazz movement, which reflected changing tastes and the influence of urban culture in Haiti during the mid-20th century. These smaller bands brought innovation to konpa, blending its established rhythms with fresh elements to create a more modern and accessible sound.

=== Mini-jazz and small bands ===
During and after the US occupation, the word "jazz" has become synonymous with music bands in Haiti. So the mini-jazz is a reduced méringue-compas band.The movement started in the mid-1960s when young, small neighborhood bands played compas featuring paired electric guitars, electric bass, drum set-conga-timbales and two cowbells, one for the timbales and the other to be played with the floor tom; some use an alto sax or a full horn section, others use a keyboard or accordion.This trend, launched by Shleu-Shleu after 1965, came to include a number of groups from Port-au-Prince neighbourhoods, especially the suburb of Pétion-Ville. Les Corvington, Tabou Combo, Les Difficiles, Les Loups Noirs, Les Frères DéJean, Les Fantaisistes de Carrefour, Bossa Combo and Les Ambassadeurs (among others) formed the core of this middle-class popular music movement. As Compas gained popularity, it was associated with Haiti's urban middle class. The music reflected the values of elites, distancing itself from the traditional African musical forms, reinforcing division of class and race.

The mini-jazz movement not only reshaped the sound of konpa but also influenced how the music was performed and consumed. These smaller bands often performed in more intimate venues, such as nightclubs and local events, which helped make the music more accessible to urban audiences. Their simplified setups made it easier for mini-jazz bands to tour and perform across Haiti, spreading their innovative take on konpa to new audiences. The movement's popularity extended beyond Haiti, with bands like Tabou Combo gaining international recognition and bringing mini-jazz to the global stage. This evolution highlighted the adaptability of konpa, allowing it to remain relevant in a rapidly modernizing society while retaining its core rhythmic identity. As for konpa, it has many different characteristics to it.

== Musical Characteristics and Instruments ==
Konpa is known for its steady rhythm, smooth melodies, and energetic beats, which make it a popular dance music. One of the key instruments is the tanbou, a traditional Haitian drum, which gives the music its driving rhythm. The drum set, congas, and timbales are also used to create the lively percussion that defines konpa.

Instruments like electric guitars are central to konpa. They are often played with a rhythmic strumming style, adding melody and groove to the music. Brass instruments such as saxophones and trumpets add a bright, vibrant sound, while some bands use keyboards or accordions to bring in additional harmonies.

The music blends these instruments to create a unique sound that is upbeat and easy to dance to. This combination of traditional and modern instruments reflects Haiti's cultural mix, with influences from African, Latin, and European music styles.

== Dance style ==
The dance-style that accompanied compas in 1957, is a two-step dance called carré (square) introduced by Nemours Jean-Baptiste in 1962. As a méringue, a ballroom dance, compas is danced in pairs. Sometimes partners dance holding each other tightly and romantically; in this case often most of the moves are made at the hips.

Konpa dancing is a smooth, flowing style that matches the rhythm of the music. It is often danced in pairs, with close partner movements that emphasize connection and coordination. The dance involves a lot of hip swaying, gentle footwork, and turns, making it both elegant and fun. The lead partner usually guides the other with subtle hand or body movements, creating a graceful and synchronized flow.

In Haitian social gatherings, konpa dancing is a key activity, bringing people together for celebrations like weddings, festivals, and community events. Over time, konpa dancing has evolved, with modern influences adding new twists and moves while keeping its traditional charm. Compared to other Caribbean dance styles, konpa dancing tends to be more intimate and fluid, unlike the fast-paced, energetic movements of merengue or salsa.

At concerts and festivals, konpa bands encourage the crowd to dance, and the music often creates an atmosphere of joy and unity. In large events like Haitian Carnival or diaspora festivals, people of all ages join in, showcasing the dance's importance as a cultural expression. This strong connection between the music and the dance keeps konpa alive as a central part of Haitian identity and celebration

== Derivatives of Compas ==
=== Zouk ===
With the Kwaze le 8 Contredanse from southern Haiti, the compas is part of Haitian culture. During the 1970s and 1980s, it was very successful in the Caribbean and contributed to the influence of Zouk in the French West Indies. Nevertheless, Zouk and its rhythm are still mainly influenced by Mazouk and Biguine from Martinique, as well as by Gwoka from Guadeloupe, traditional music from the French Antilles.

=== Coladeira ===
In the 1960s, the coladeira emerged as a livelier counterpart to the morna. The coladeira is played in fast double time, accompanying informal pop-style couple dances. Its main influences seem to be obscure folk processional music of the same name, commercial African American music, the morna and, above all, modern French Caribbean pop music. Most often it is played by a modern dance band, i.e. with drums, bass, electric guitars, etc. From the 1960s to the 1980s, Haitian artists and groups such as Claudette & Ti Pierre, Tabou Combo and especially Gesner Henry a.k.a. Coupé Cloué and the Dominican group Exile One were very popular in Africa. In addition, the French West Indies group Kassav' and other West Indian musicians, whose main music is Zouk, have toured Cabo Island on various occasions. Many Cape Verdean artists play zouk and compas. A good example is the talented Tito Paris dança ma mi Criola (1994), one of the most popular songs of all time in Cabo Verde; this CD contained music close to Haiti Tabou Combo, Caribbean Sextet, Tropicana and French Antilles Kassav', etc. Cape Verdean artists were exposed to zouk and compas in the US and France. Acculturation has been aided by the growth of overseas communities (especially in New England) whose population now exceeds that of Cape Verde itself (about 300,000). Today, the new generation of Cape Verdean artists play a rhythm close to "Zouk love" and Konpa.

== Representation of Compas in Literature and Media ==
Although Konpa has had a significant cultural impact globally, it is still underrepresented in academic literature, with a major content gap. Scholarship has often highlighted other Caribbean genres such as reggae, salsa, and Soca, leaving little room for analysis on the evolution of Compas and its influence. This lack of recognition in literature may be a result of historical marginalization within Caribbean studies, where Haitian cultural contributions are commonly overlooked.

Additionally, cultural stereotypes contribute to this underrepresentation. Konpa is often viewed as just a form of entertainment, which diminishes its deep history and cultural significance. Haitian music, including Konpa, is frequently misinterpreted and underappreciated despite its strong connections to Haitian identity and resistance.

A significant amount of Haitian history is passed down orally, which makes documentation and academic analysis difficult. Cultural traditions such as Compas use oral transmissions historically in the Caribbean, which have traditionally been marginalized by European academic frameworks that prefer written narratives over oral ones. This has contributed to the lack of focus and studies on Konpa music and dance, leaving it quite unexplored.

Konpa also faces a lack of representation in the media compared to other Caribbean genres. This disproportion comes from global industries that support selective representation in media, that prefer to promote economically dominant genres. Stereotypes that ignore Konpas' cultural and historical significance are reinforced by these actions. Additionally, the use of Haitian Creole in Konpa music restricts its media reach, making it less accessible to non-Creole-speaking populations.

In the mid-2020s, compas began experiencing popularity in the Latin music world with artists such as Ryan Castro, Rawayana, and Beéle blending the genre with Latin sounds. In 2026, compas became eligible under the category for Best Contemporary Tropical Album at the Latin Grammy Awards. However, the category requires the recording to be predominately in Spanish or another language spoken in Hispanic America, thus excluding the genre's native language roots.

== See also ==
- Culture of Haiti
- Haitian Carnival
- Music of Latin America
