= Exile One =

Caribbean cadence musical group

- Origin: Dominica, West Indies
- Genres: Kadans; Cadence-lypso; Zouk; World music
- Years active: Early 1970s–present
- Members: Gordon Henderson; Vivian Wallace; Fitzroy Williams; Julie Mourillon

Exile One is a cadence musical group founded by Gordon Henderson in the 1970s with musicians invited over from Dominica, to be based in Guadeloupe. The band was influential in the development of Caribbean music. It became famous throughout the Caribbean, Europe, Africa and the Indian Ocean. Exile One opened the way for numerous Cadence-Lypso artists as well as for Zouk.

== History ==
In 1969, Gordon Henderson (the "Creole father of soul" and "Godfather of Cadence-lypso") decided that the French Overseas Department of Guadeloupe had everything he needed to begin a career in Creole music. From there, lead singer Gordon Henderson went on to found a kadans fusion band, the Vikings of Guadeloupe – of which Kassav' co-founder Pierre-Eduard Decimus was a member. At some point he felt that he should start his own group and asked a former school friend Fitzroy Williams to recruit a few Dominicans to complete those he had already selected. The group was named Exile One. During the early 1970s, they initiated a fusion of cadence and calypso "Cadence-lypso" that would later have influence on the evolution of a certain style of soca music.

The full-horn section kadans band Exile One led by Gordon Henderson introduced the newly arrived synthesizers to their music that other young cadence or compas bands from Dominica, Haiti (mini-jazz) and the French Antilles emulated in the 1970s. In the early 1980s, lead guitarist Julie Mourillon of Exile One formed a new group called Roots of Exile. Together, they launched a new beat dubbed "Island Boogie", a fusion of cadence-lypso and North American funk and soul music and toured Africa and Europe.

Exile One and Grammacks were two influential figures in the promotion of cadence-lypso in the 1970s. They were inspirational for Kassav and the emergence of zouk in the 1980s. Exile One was the first kadans band to sign a production contract with a major label called Barclay Records, and the first to export kadans music to the four corners of the globe: Japan, the Indian Ocean, Africa, North America, Europe and The Cape Verde islands.

== Gordon Henderson ==
Gordon Henderson was born in Roseau, Dominica, grew up in the town of Portsmouth and received his secondary education at the St. Mary's Academy in Roseau, where he joined the "glee club" and participated in talent shows, activities which encouraged the pursuit of a career in music.

Gordon Henderson musical career began with short stints with various teenage bands performing at talent shows and dances around the Island. In the late 1960s he formed his own quartet called Voltage Four, patterned on American group Booker T and the MGs or The Meters, and mainly toured the French Islands of Martinique and Guadeloupe. In 1970, Henderson moved to Guadeloupe to become the lead singer of "Les Vikings" of Guadeloupe, a group that toured the French Departments of Guiana, Martinique, St. Martin and Metropolitan France. He wrote and recorded a song titled “Love” with the Vikings which became a huge hit across the Caribbean and particularly in Suriname and later the Netherlands.

Gordon Henderson is the leader and founder of the famous musical group Exile One and the one who coined the name Cadence-lypso. The group became known for having created Cadence-lypso defined by Henderson as “a synthesis of Caribbean rhythmic patterns...” The music combined Haitian cadence and the Anglo-calypso music with Creole in a manner that Haitians as well as Jamaicans could identify. Cadence-lypso revolutionized Caribbean music while Gordon Henderson’s Exile One visited every Caribbean country on a regular basis to perform. Record licenses existed in Jamaica, Barbados, Colombia, and Japan among other places. The group became a household name in several African countries and the islands of the Indian Ocean.

In 1975, Exile One became the first Creole act to sign a major recording contract with the French label Barclay, today a part of Universal. Exile One would go on to sell gold records. Gordon Henderson went on to produce other artists including, Ophelia, a fellow Dominican who is known as the Creole lady of song. He also took time off to study the French language and researched Creole culture. In forty years, Gordon Henderson and Exile One has worked with scores of different musicians.

In the 1980s he got involved in creating Tropic FM in Paris, France, a radio station now known as Media Tropical targeting the Caribbean Diaspora in France. He produced and hosted a TV show called Feel the World Beat that was broadcast on selected PBS stations in the US and the RFO-SAT network. Henderson spearheaded the creation of an annual international music event in Dominica, The World Creole Music Festival, featuring the best performers of Creole music.

A Brazilian version of a Gordon Henderson's composition "Jamais voir ça" sold more than 2.5 million copies, recorded by Carlos Santos with the title "Quero Voce". In addition Henderson has been the recipient of numerous gold records for sales of over 100,000 in France.

Henderson has received numerous awards at home and abroad, among them the AFRICAR MUSIC AWARDS in the Ivory Coast, the Golden Drum, the National Meritorious award, Lime Lifetime Achievement, the DFC lifetime achievement (twice), and the CIAO award Washington, among others.

Among his other achievements he is author of a book titled Zoukland, and credits as producer and performer of more than 30 long-playing recording projects. Publications references include: The Pop Music of a Continent (African All Stars) by Chris Stapleton and Chris May; Zouk: World Music in the West Indies by Jocelyne Guilbault (University Chicago Press); and World Music/The Rough Guide by The Penguin Group.

== Members ==
The original members of Exile One.

- Gordon Henderson - Lead vocal, organ
- Fitzroy Williams - Organ, synthesizer
- Oliver Cruickshank - Drums
- Julie Mourillon - Guitar, chorus
- Vivian Wallace - Bass, chorus
- Kremlin Fingal - Trumpet, chorus
- Pierre Labor - Sax, chorus
