= Zouk =

French Antillean music genre

- Stylistic origins: Cadence rampa; compas; cadence-lypso; bélé; biguine; gwo ka
- Cultural origins: Early 1980s, French Antilles (esp. Guadeloupe and Martinique)
- Typical instruments: Gwo ka; tibwa; shak shak; brass; synthesizer; guitar; bass guitar; drum machine
- Derivative forms: Zouk-love, Kizomba

Regional scenes
- French West Indies; Dominica; Haiti; Central Africa; Brazil; Colombia; France

Zouk is a musical movement and dance pioneered by the French Antillean band Kassav' in the early 1980s. It was originally characterized by a fast tempo (120–145 bpm), a percussion-driven rhythm, and a loud horn section. Musicians from Martinique and Guadeloupe eventually added MIDI instrumentation to their compas style, which developed into a genre called zouk-love. Zouk-love is effectively the French Lesser Antilles' compas, and it gradually became indistinguishable from compas.

== Zouk béton ==
The original fast carnival style of zouk, best represented by the band Kassav', became known as "zouk béton", "zouk chiré", or "zouk hard". Zouk béton is considered a synthesis of various French Antillean dance music styles of the 20th century, including kadans, konpa, and biguine.

== See also ==
- Brazilian Zouk
- Music of Latin America
- Music of Martinique
- Music of Guadeloupe
- Music of France
