= List of Caribbean music genres =

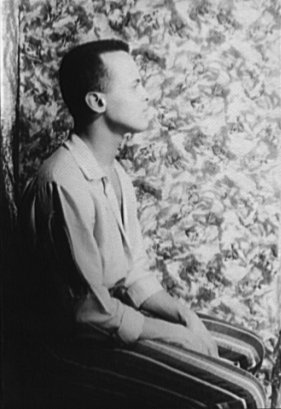
Harry Belafonte, a Jamaican-American pop-calypso singer in 1954

Caribbean music genres are very diverse. They are each synthesis of African, European, Asian and Indigenous influences, largely created by descendants of African enslaved people (see Afro-Caribbean music), along with contributions from other communities (such as Indo-Caribbean music). Some of the styles to gain wide popularity outside the Caribbean include, bachata, merengue, palo, mambo, baithak gana, bouyon, cadence-lypso, calypso, soca, chutney, chutney-soca, compas, dancehall, jing ping, parang, pichakaree, punta, ragga, reggae, dembow, reggaeton, Wilders, salsa, and zouk. Caribbean music is also related to Central American and South American music.

The history of Caribbean music originates from the history of the Caribbean itself. That history is one of the native land invaded by outsiders; violence, slavery, and even genocide factor in.

Following Christopher Columbus' landing in 1492, Spain laid claim to the entire Caribbean. This claim was met with dissatisfaction from both the natives and Spain's neighbors in Europe; within a few years, battles between the European powers raged across the region. These battles, alongside the various European diseases which accompanied them, decimated the native tribes who inhabited the islands.

Thus the Caribbean was colonized as part of the various European empires. Native cultures were further eroded when the Europeans imported African slaves to work the sugar and coffee plantations on their island colonies. In many cases, native cultures (and native musics) were replaced by those imported from Africa and Europe.

At this point, whatever common Caribbean culture existed was splintered. Each of the European powers had imposed its own culture on the islands they had claimed. In the late 20th century, many Caribbean islands gained independence from colonial rule but the European influences can still be heard in the music of each subtly different culture.

Island-specific culture also informs the music of the Caribbean. Every island has its distinct musical styles, all inspired, to one degree or another, by the music brought over from the African slaves. As such, most Caribbean music, however unique to its own island culture, includes elements of African music - heavy use of percussion, complex rhythmic patterns, and call-and-response vocals. In many cases, the difference between one style and another comes down to the rhythms utilized in each music; every island has its own rhythmic sensibilities.

The complex deep origins of Caribbean music are best understood with a knowledge of Western Hemisphere colonial immigration patterns, human trafficking patterns, the resulting melting pot of people each of its nations and territories, and thus resulting influx of original musical influences. Colonial Caribbean ancestors were predominantly from West Africa, West Europe and India. In the 20th and 21st centuries immigrants have also come from Taiwan, China, Indonesia/Java and the Middle East. Neighboring Latin American and North American (particularly hip hop and pop music) countries have also naturally influenced Caribbean culture and vice versa. While there are musical commonalities among Caribbean nations and territories, the variation in immigration patterns and colonial hegemony tend to parallel the variations in musical influence. Language barriers (Spanish, Portuguese, English, Hindustani, Tamil, Telugu, Arabic, Chinese, Hebrew, Yiddish, Yoruba, African languages, Indian languages, Amerindian languages, French, Indonesian, Javanese and Dutch) are one of the strongest influences.

Divisions between Caribbean music genres are not always well-defined, because many of these genres share common relations, instrumentation and have influenced each other in many ways and directions. For example, the Jamaican mento style has a long history of conflation with Trinidadian calypso. Elements of calypso have come to be used in mento, and vice versa, while their origins lie in the Caribbean culture, each uniquely characterized by influences from the Shango and Shouters religions of Trinidad and the Kumina spiritual tradition of Jamaica. Music from the Spanish-speaking areas of the Caribbean are classified as tropical music in the Latin music industry.

== Antigua and Barbuda ==
By the mid-20th century Antigua and Barbuda had active calypso and steelpan scenes as part of its annual Carnival celebration. Hell's Gate, along with Brute Force and the Big Shell Steelband, were the first Caribbean steelbands to be recorded and featured on commercial records thanks to the efforts of the American record producer Emory Cook. Short Shirt, Swallow, and Obstinate were among the most popular calypsonians who competed in the island's annual calypso competition.

=== Benna ===
Benna is an uptempo Antiguan folk song, also spelled bennah and known as ditti. It is characterized by lyrics that focus on scandalous gossip, performed in a call and response style. It has also been a means of folk communication, spreading news and political commentary across the island. Other genres include:

- Extempo
- Iron Band
- Pan music
- Soca

== Bahamas ==
- Goombay
- Junkanoo
- Rake-and-scrape
- Bahamian Rhyming Spiritual

== Barbados ==
- Folk
- Tuk
- Spouge
- Fling
- Calypso jazz
- Iron Band
- Ragga Socee
- Reggae
- Soca
- Bashment Soca

== Belize ==
- Punta
- Punta rock
- Chumba
- Fedu
- Brukdown
- Reggae
- Dancehall
- Cumbia
- Bachata

== Colombia ==
- Berroche
- Bullerengue
- Champeta
- Chandé
- Chalupa
- Cumbia
- Cumbión
- Fandango
- Garabato
- Grito e' monte
- Guacherna
- Guaracha
- Jalao
- Lumbalú
- Mapalé
- Merecumbé
- Millo
- Parrandín
- Paseaito
- Perillero
- Porro
- Reggaeton
- Salsa
- Son Faroto
- Son de Negro
- Son Sabanero
- Son Palenquero
- Tambora (Golpe de tambora)
- Terapia
- Zafra
- Vallenato y sus aires:
  - Paseo
  - Son
  - Merengue
  - Puya
  - Tambora
- Abambucao
- Romanza vallenata
- Piqueria
- Calipso
- Foxtrot
- Mazurka
- Mento
- ModeUp
- Dancehall
- Pasillo Isleño
- Polka
- Praise Hymn
- Quadrille
- Reggae
- Schottis
- Socca
- Ska
- Vals isleño
- Zouk

== Cuba ==
- Abwe
- Afro-Cuban jazz
- Areito
- Bakosó
- Batá and yuka
- Batá-rumba
- Bembe
- Boogaloo
- Bolero
- Chachachá
- Changui
- Charanga
- Conga
- Columbia
- Comparsa
- Criolla
- Cuban hip hop
- Cuban jazz
- Cubatón
- Danzón
- Danzonete
- Dengue
- Descarga
- Filín
- Folk
- Guaguanco
- Guajira
- Guaracha
- Guarapachangueo
- Habanera
- Latin Jazz
- Mambo
- Mozambique
- Nueva trova
- Paca
- Pachanga
- Pilón
- Pregón
- Punto guajiro
- Reggae en Español
- Rock
- Rumba
- Salsa
- Son
- Son-batá
- Songo
- Son Montuno
- Timba
- Trova
- Tumba francesa
- UPA
- Yambú

== Dominica ==
=== Chanté mas ===
Chanté mas (masquerade song) is a tradition from the music of Dominica, based in Carnival celebrations and performed by groups of masquerading partygoers. They use the call-and-response format, and lyrics are often light-hearted insulting, and discuss local scandals and rumors. Other genres include:

- Bélé
- Calypso music
- Bouyon music
- Cadence-lypso
- Jing-Ping
- Kadans
- Mini-jazz
- Quadrille
- Zouk

soca music

== Dominican Republic ==
- Bachata
- Bolero
- Latin Rap
- Merengue
- Perico Ripiao
- Pambiche
- Palo music
- Tumba
- Zapateo
- Carabiné
- Merengue House
- Salsa
- Mangulina
- Son
- Trapchata
- Zarambo
- Dominican Rock
- Dominican Dembow

== Dutch West Indies ==
Bari is a festival, dance, drum and song type from the Dutch Antillean island of Bonaire. It is led by a single singer, who improvises. Lyrics often concern local figures and events of importance.

Quimbe is a topical song form from the Dutch Antillean St Maarten. It traditionally accompanies the ponum dance and drumming, but is now often performed without accompaniment. Lyrics include gossip, news and social criticism, and use clever puns and rhymes. Performance is often competitive in nature.

Tumba is a style of Curaçao music, strongly African in origin, despite the name's origin in a 17th-century Spanish dance. Traditional tumba is characterized by scandalous, gossiping and accusatory lyrics, but modern tumba often eschews such topics. It is well known abroad, and dates to the early 19th century. It is now a part of the Carnival Road March.

Other genres include:

- Latin Rap
- Ritmo Kombiná
- Tambú
- Seú
- Wals
- Zumbi

== Guadeloupe ==
- Balakadri
- Biguine
- Bolero
- Bouyon gwada
- Cadence-lypso
- Gwo ka
- Hip hop
- Kadans
- Quadrille
- Mini-jazz
- Zouk

== Guyana ==
Shanto is a form of Guyanese music, related to both calypso and mento, and became a major part of early popular music through its use in Guyanese vaudeville shows; songs are topical and light-hearted, often accompanied by a guitar. Other genres include:

- Chutney
- Chutney Soca
- Dancehall
- Calypso

== Haiti ==
=== Compas / kompa ===
Compas, short for compas direct, is the modern méringue (mereng in creole) that was popularized in the mid-1950s by the sax and guitar player Nemours Jean-Baptiste. His méringue soon became popular throughout the Antilles, especially in Martinique and Guadeloupe. Webert Sicot and Nemours Jean-Baptiste became the two leaders in the group. Sicot then left and formed a new group and an intense rivalry developed, though they remained good friends. To differentiate himself from Nemours, Sicot called his modern méringue, Cadence rampa.

In Creole, it is spelled as konpa dirèk or simply konpa. It is commonly spelled as it is pronounced as kompa.

=== Méringue ===
Evolving in Haiti during the mid-1800s, the Haitian méringue (known as the mereng in creole) is regarded as the oldest surviving form of its kind performed today and is its national symbol. According to Jean Fouchard, mereng evolved from the fusion of slave music genres (such as the chica and calenda) with ballroom forms related to the French-Haitian contredanse (kontradans in creole). Mereng's name, he says, derives from the mouringue music of the Bara, a tribe of Madagascar. That few Malagasies came to the Americas casts doubt on this etymology, but it is significant because it emphasizes what Fouchard (and most Haitians) consider the African-derived nature of their music and national identity. Méringue has lost popularity to konpa.

=== Mizik rasin ===
Mizik rasin is a musical movement that began in Haïti in 1987 when musicians began combining elements of traditional Haitian Vodou ceremonial and folkloric music with rock and roll. This style of modern music reaching back to the roots of Vodou tradition came to be called mizik rasin ("roots music") in Haitian Creole or musique racine in French. In context, the movement is often referred to simply as rasin or racine.

Starting in the late 1970s (with discontent surrounding the increasing opulence of the Duvalier dictatorship), youth from Port-au-Prince (and to a lesser extent Cap-Haïtien and other urban areas) began experimenting with new types of life. François Duvalier's appropriation of Vodou images as a terror technique, the increase in U.S. assembly and large-scale export agriculture, the popularity of disco, and Jean-Claude Duvalier's appreciation of konpa and chanson française disillusioned many youth and love.

To question the dictatorship's notion of "the Haitian nation" (and thus the dictatorship itself), several men began trying a new way of living, embodied in the Sanba Movement. They drew upon global trends in black power, Bob Marley, "Hippie"-dom, as well as prominently from rural life in Haiti. They dressed in the traditional blue denim (karoko) of peasants, eschewed the commercialized and processed life offered by global capitalism, and celebrated the values of communal living. Later, they adopted matted hair which resembled dreadlocks, but identified the style as something which existed in Haiti with the term cheve simbi, referring to water spirits.

In the 1990s, commercial success came to the musical genre that came to be known as mizik rasin, or "roots music". Musicians like Boukman Eksperyans, and Boukan Ginen, and to a lesser extent RAM, incorporated reggae, rock and funk rhythms into traditional forms and instrumentation, including rara, music from kanaval, or traditional spiritual music from the rural hamlets called lakous, like Lakou Souvnans, Lakou Badjo, Lakou Soukri, or Lakou Dereyal.

=== Twoubadou ===
Twoubadou is another form of folk music played by peripatetic troubadours playing some combination of acoustic, guitar, beat box and accordion instruments singing ballads of Haitian, French or Caribbean origin. It is in some ways similar to Son Cubano from Cuba as a result of Haitian migrant laborers who went to work on Cuban sugar plantations at the turn of the century. Musicians perform at the Port-au-Prince International Airport and also at bars and restaurants in Pétion-Ville.

=== Other ===
- Kompa
- Cadence rampa (kadans)
- Coumbite (kombite)
- Haitian Gospel
- Haitian hip hop (rap kreyòl)
- Haitian rock (rock kreyòl)
- Kontradans
- Mini-jazz
- Rabòday
- Rara music
- Rara tech
- Vodou drumming
- Zouk

== Honduras ==
The music of Honduras is varied. Punta is the main "ritmo" of Honduras, with similar sounds such as Caribbean salsa, merengue, reggae, reggaeton, And kompa all widely heard especially in the North, to Mexican rancheras heard in the interior rural part of the country. Honduras' capital Tegucigalpa is an important center for modern Honduran music, and is home to the College for Fine Arts.

Folk music is played with guitar, marimba and other instruments. Popular folk songs include La ceiba and Candú.

Other genres include:

- Reggaeton
- Rock
- Garifuna music
- Bachata
- Matamuerte
- Classical music
- Merengue
- Hip Hop
- Pop Latino
- Cumbia
- Salsa
- Spanish rock

== Jamaica ==
Jamaica has sometimes been considered the world's least populous cultural superpower, especially with its influence on music. The music of Jamaica includes Jamaican folk music and many popular genres, such as mento, ska, rocksteady, reggae, dub music, dancehall, reggae fusion and related styles.

Mento, often considered Jamaica's first popular music genre, developed in the late 19th and early 20th centuries. It is a lively, acoustic form of music that blends African rhythms with European folk melodies, reflecting the island's cultural hybridity. Characterized by the use of instruments such as the banjo, rumba box (a bass instrument), and hand drums, mento often features humorous and satirical lyrics that comment on social issues and everyday life. The genre gained popularity in the 1940s and 1950s, serving as a precursor to ska and reggae.

Ska emerged in the late 1950s as Jamaica's first truly modern music genre. It combined elements of mento, American jazz, rhythm and blues, and Caribbean calypso. Known for its upbeat tempo, offbeat guitar strumming, and prominent brass sections, ska became a symbol of national pride in post-independence Jamaica. The genre's themes often addressed social and political issues while maintaining a danceable and celebratory feel. Ska would later evolve into rocksteady, a slower and more soulful offshoot.

Rocksteady, which gained popularity in the mid-1960s, marked a transition from ska to reggae. It slowed down the tempo of ska, emphasizing smoother rhythms and more introspective lyrics. The bassline became a central feature, and themes often revolved around love, social struggles, and Rastafarian beliefs. Rocksteady was short-lived as a dominant genre but played a crucial role in shaping reggae, with many iconic Jamaican artists beginning their careers in this style.

Reggae, Jamaica's most globally recognized genre, emerged in the late 1960s. It is characterized by its slow tempo, offbeat rhythm, and socially conscious lyrics that address issues such as poverty, oppression, spirituality, and resistance. Reggae became a vehicle for the Rastafarian movement, promoting messages of peace, unity, and liberation. Bob Marley, one of the genre's pioneers, brought reggae to international prominence, making it a symbol of Jamaican identity and cultural influence worldwide.

Dub music, a subgenre of reggae, originated in the late 1960s and early 1970s as producers experimented with remixing tracks. It emphasizes instrumental versions of songs, featuring heavy use of reverb, echo, and bass. Dub is known for its innovative sound manipulation techniques, often creating a hypnotic and immersive listening experience. The genre greatly influenced electronic music and remix culture globally.

Dancehall emerged in the late 1970s and became one of Jamaica's most popular and enduring genres. It is characterized by its digital rhythms, faster tempos, and often risqué or humorous lyrics. Dancehall reflects urban Jamaican life, with themes ranging from romance and partying to social critique. The genre gave rise to iconic artists like Shabba Ranks, Beenie Man, and Sean Paul, who helped popularize it internationally.

Reggae fusion, a modern evolution of Jamaican music, blends reggae and dancehall with elements of pop, hip-hop, R&B, and other genres. Emerging in the late 20th century, reggae fusion appeals to global audiences while maintaining its Jamaican roots. Artists like Shaggy, Sean Paul, and Rihanna have incorporated reggae fusion into their music, continuing Jamaica's legacy of cultural influence on the world stage.

Genres:

- Two-tone
- African reggae
- Ambient dub
- Burru
- Dancehall reggae
- Dancehall
- Dembow
- Drum and bass
- Dub
- Dub poetry
- Dub reggae
- Dub techno
- Dubstep
- Dubtronica
- Gerreh
- Gospel reggae
- Jungle (music)
- Kumina
- Lovers rock
- Mento
- Nagos
- Nyabinghi
- Rockers
- Pop reggae
- Ragga jungle
- Ragga soca
- Raggacore
- Raggamuffin
- Ragga
- Reggae fusion
- Reggae pop
- Reggae rock
- Reggaeton
- Reggae
- Rocksteady
- Roots reggae
- Rub-a-Dub
- Ska jazz
- Ska punk
- Ska reggae
- Ska revival
- Ska rock
- Skacore
- Ska
- Steppers
- Tambo
- Third wave ska
- Toasting (Jamaican music)
- Raggamuffin
- Ragga
- Singjay

== Martinique ==
- Bèlè (Bel Air)
- Biguine
- Chouval bwa
- Hip hop
- Jump up
- Kadans
- Mini-jazz
- Quadrille
- Zouk
- Mazouk (Mazurka)

== Puerto Rico ==
- Aguinaldo
- Bachata
- Balada
- Bolero
- Boogaloo
- Bomba
- Cha-Cha-Chá
- Classical
- Dancehall
- Danza
- Décima
- Dembow
- Guaracha
- Jíbaro
- Latin Freestyle
- Latin Hip-Hop
- Latin House
- Latin Jazz
- Latin Pop
- Latin Rock
- Latin Trap
- Mambo
- Merengue
- Merenhouse
- Plena
- Reggae
- Reggae en Español
- Reggaeton
- Salsa
- Salsa Romántica
- Spanish Dancehall
- Seis
- Son

== Saint Kitts and Nevis ==
- Big Drum
- Calypso
- Soca
- Steelpan
- Stringband music

== Saint Lucia ==
Jwé is a kind of rural music from Saint Lucia, performed informally at wakes, beach parties, full moon gatherings and other events, including débòt dances. Jwé uses raunchy lyrics and innuendos to show off verbal skills, and to express political and comedic commentaries on current events and well-known individuals. One well-known technique that has entered Lucian culture is lang dévivé, which is when the singer says the opposite of his true meaning. Other genres include:

- Calypso
- Extempo
- Kont
- Soca
- Zouk
- Dancehall
- Dub
- Reggae

== Saint Vincent and the Grenadines ==
Big Drum is a style found in Saint Vincent and the Grenadines and elsewhere in the Windward Islands, especially Carriacou. It is accompanied by drums traditionally made from tree trunks, though rum kegs are now more common. Satirical and political lyrics are common, performed by a female singer called a chantwell and accompanied by colorfully costumed dancers. Big Drum is performed at celebrations like weddings and the launchings of new boats. Chutney-soca is another genre.

== Suriname ==
Kaseko is a music genre that originated in Suriname. The term Kaseko is probably derived from the French expression casser le corps (break the body), which was used during slavery to indicate a very swift dance. It is a fusion of numerous popular and folk styles. It is rhythmically complex, with percussion instruments including skratji (a very large bass drum). Songs are typically call-and-response.

Other genres include:

- Baithak Gana
- Indo-Caribbean
- Aleke
- Kawina

== Trinidad and Tobago ==
=== Calypso ===
Calypso is a Trinidadian music, which traditionally uses a slow tempo to accompany vocalist-composers, or calypsonians. Songs are often improvised and humorous, with sexual innuendo, political and social commentary, and picong, a style of lyricism that teases people in a light-hearted way. Calypso is competitively performed in calypso tents at Carnival. Calypso uses rhythms derived from West Africa, with cut time, and features dance as an important component. Calypso's roots were frequently ascribed to the Bahamas, Jamaica, Bermuda or the Virgin Islands. Calypso can be traced back to at least 1859, when a visiting ornithologist in Trinidad ascribed calypso's origins in British ballads. While calypso has a diverse heritage, calypso became a distinct genre when it developed in Trinidad. The word caliso refers to topical songs in the dialect of Saint Lucia, and may be linguistically related to the word calypso.

=== Cariso ===
Cariso is a kind of Trinidadian folk music, and an important ancestor of calypso music. It is lyrically topical, and frequently sarcastic or mocking in the picong tradition, and is sung primarily in French creole by singers called chantwells. Cariso may come from carieto, a Carib word meaning joyous song, and can also be used synonymously with careso.

=== Chutney ===
Chutney is a form indigenous to the southern Caribbean, popular in Guyana, Trinidad, Jamaica and Suriname. It derives elements from traditional Indian music and popular Trinidadian Soca music.

=== Soca ===
Soca is a style of Caribbean music originating in Trinidad and Tobago.

Soca originally combined the melodic lilting sound of calypso with insistent cadence|cadence-lypso percussion (which is often electronic in recent music), and Indian musical instruments—particularly the dholak, tabla and dhantal—as demonstrated in Shorty's classic compositions "Ïndrani" and "Shanti Om". During the 80's, the influence of zouk which was derived from cadence-lypso music from Dominica as popularized by the French Antillean band Kassav' had a major impact on the development of modern soca music.

=== Other ===
- Afrosoca
- Chut-kai-pang
- Chutney-soca
- Caribbean pop
- Gospelypso
- Indo-Caribbean
- Kaiso
- Pan music
- Parang
- Pichakaree
- Rapso
- Yahdees

== Venezuela ==
- Musica llanera
- Merengue
- Gaita
- Tambores
- Salsa

== Virgin Islands ==
=== Careso ===
- Careso is a Virgin Islander song form, which is now entirely performed for special holiday and appreciation or education events, by folkloric ensembles. It is similar to quelbe in some ways, but has more sustained syllables, a more African melodic style and an all female, call and response format with lyrics that function as news and gossip communicator, also commemorating and celebrating historical events.

=== Other ===
- Scratch band
- Bamboula
- Masquerade music

=== Quelbe ===
Quelbe is a form of Virgin Islander folk music that originated on St. Croix, now most commonly performed by groups called scratch bands. Traditionally, however, quelbe was performed informally by solo singers at festivals and other celebrations. Hidden meanings and sexual innuendos were common, and lyrics focused on political events like boycotts.

== Yucatán, Mexico ==
- Bolero
- Chachachá
- Conga
- Criolla
- Danzón
- Guaracha
- Mambo
- Marimba
- Salsa
- Son
- Troval
- Cumbia
