= Fox Fuse =

US music company

- Type: LLC
- Genre: soca, chutney, chutney soca, chutney parang, reggae, dancehall, parang, Bouyon music, Bouyon soca, hip-hop, pop
- Founded: 2007
- Founder: Rhona Fox
- Headquarters: Tampa, Florida, United States
- Area served: Worldwide
- Key people: Zack Cohen (CEO)
- Services: Digital Distribution of music, music marketing and music promotion / distribution of Promotional recordings
- Owner: Rhona Fox; Zack Cohen
- Website: www.foxfuse.com

Fox Fuse is a digital music label for Caribbean music and is the largest label worldwide for soca and chutney music. Based in Tampa, Florida (previously in New York City), Fox Fuse has worked with clients such as Pitbull, Lil Jon and Shaggy, and has some of the performers and producers in Caribbean music exclusively-signed to its roster.

== Music label ==
Fox Fuse entered the music distribution business in February 2012, releasing Trinidadian soca star Farmer Nappy's album 'You Make Me...Surrender.' Fox Fuse also released Farmer Nappy's hit album "Big People Party" in February 2014.

On February 17, 2015, Fox Fuse released its first executive-produced compilation titled 'Get Soca 2015,' which debuted at #3 on the Billboard's Reggae Albums chart and remained on the chart for seven consecutive weeks. 'Get Soca 2015' was also featured on the United States iTunes store homepage, during its week of release and it went on to peak at #3 on the United States iTunes store Reggae section Top Albums chart, #3 on the Canadian iTunes store World/Reggae Top Albums chart, and #10 on the United Kingdom iTunes store Reggae Top Albums chart.

In May 2015, Fox Fuse released 'Stand And Be Counted' by Trinidadian Gospel reggae star Positive, which debuted at #9 on Billboard Top Reggae Albums chart, a major accomplishment for Caribbean Gospel music.

In July 2015, Billboard cited Fox Fuse as being the "world’s largest distributor of Cropover music." Fox Fuse released its second executive-produced compilation to celebrate the 2015 Cropover season, titled 'Fox Fuse Presents: Crop Over Soca 2015.'

In keeping with its mission statement of providing a powerful channel for quality Caribbean music to the global audience, according to its website, Fox Fuse has over 70 exclusively-signed label partners, which includes production houses, producers and artists. In August 2015, the Daily News (New York) stated that Fox Fuse "is currently the world’s largest music label for contemporary soca music."

== Artist management ==
Fox Fuse delved into the artist management business in 2012 with Jamaican dancehall artist Stein.

== History ==
Fox Fuse was founded in 2007 by Rhona Fox. The company made a name for itself as a media-marketing agency for Caribbean music, representing acts such as Shaggy, Gyptian, Richie Spice, Kevin Lyttle, Drupatee Ramgoonai, and Machel Montano. Fox Fuse has also represented concerts like Best of the Best in Miami in 2009 and 2010, working with acts such as Diddy, Flo Rida, Rick Ross and Nicki Minaj. Rhona Fox served as the official spokesperson for the concert for those two years. In 2012, Fox Fuse became a partnership when former VP Records licensing manager, Zack Cohen, joined the company and it evolved into a music label.

== Notable people ==
- Rhona Fox (CEO)
- Zack Cohen (CEO)
