= Bouyon soca =

Music genre

Bouyon Music
- Stylistic origins: Bouyon, Soca music
- Cultural origins: Early 2000s, Dominica
- Typical instruments: Drum set, Drum machine, Horn section, two synthesizers, rhythmic guitar, bass guitar, rhythmic accordion, pulsating conch shell

Local scenes
- Dominica; Saint Lucia; Antigua; British Virgin Islands; U.S. Virgin Islands; French Antilles; St Vincent; Trinidad and Tobago

Other topics
- Windward Caribbean Kulture

Bouyon soca is a fusion-genre of bouyon music originating from Dominica and soca music originating from Trinidad and Tobago and the other English speaking Caribbean islands. Bouyon soca typically blends old bouyon music rhythms from the 90s' and soca music creating a unique style soca sound. The style of music was made more popular to the Caribbean region by the likes of the producer Dada and artists ASA from Dominica with collaborations from Trinidadian and St.Vincent artist such as Skinny Fabulous, Bunji Garlin, Iwer George and Machel Montano. Noticeable hits includes Famalay and Conch Shell. With noticeable Bouyon flavored rhythms and sounds with the essence of Soca tempo and lyrical attributes.

== History ==
The nineties in Dominica have been dominated by a new musical form called bouyon music. The best-known band in the genre is Windward Caribbean Kulture (WCK), who originated the style in 1988 by experimenting with a fusion of Cadence-lypso and Jing ping. They began using native drum rhythms such as lapo kabwit and elements of the music of jing ping bands, as well as ragga-style vocals.

From a language perspective, Bouyon draws on English and Dominican Creole French with influences from the chanté mas tradition. Bouyon involves chanting rather than singing and is very much influenced by dancehall-reggae-rap language style, coming out of Jamaica. Bouyon-muffin and reketeng is an offshoot of this tendency. While bouyon lyrics comment on everyday life in the cultural sense, they can also contain explicit social commentary in the political sense.

== Origin ==
Bouyon soca, sometimes referred to as Jump up soca, is a fusion genre that typically blends old bouyon rhythms from the '90s and soca music. Bouyon soca is a term coined by Dominican producers and musicians, who embrace both Soca from Trinidad and Bouyon music from Dominica and so find it natural to produce blends of both music genres. Bouyon is a music genre that originated in Dominica that is distinguishable from its older "colleague" Soca.

In Dominica while there may have been the occasional fusions, bouyon has always maintained a very clear, recognizable and different style from soca. Outside of Dominica the Bouyon Soca fusion style is popular in islands like Antigua, Saint Lucia, Guadeloupe and Martinique and is a natural evolution from Zouk and Soca fusions that were popular there during the 1980s.

== Popularity ==
Bouyon soca is a fusion of bouyon and soca produced mainly in Caribbean Island if Dominica. Donovan bands have been mixing both sounds since the 90's. However, producers from Saint Lucia have been experimenting with fusing bouyon and soca from the early 2000s, when Saint Lucian artist Ricky T released a song "Pressure boom" in 2007 which blended the two genres this hit song helped the fusion to become more popular throughout the English speaking Caribbean. In modern times the songs Famalay and Conch Shell from Dominican producers Dada and lyrics from Trinidad and St.Vincent Artists such as Skinny Fabulous and Machel Montano has cemented the future of genre.

This style of Soca is mostly, but not exclusively, produced in both Dominica and Saint Lucia. However, Dominica being the lead in the creative space of the sound will always shape the inspiration and direction of the genre.
