= Olatunji Yearwood =

Trinidadian musician

- Born: Olatunji Yearwood; September 3, 1985 (age 41); Port of Spain
- Origin: Trinidad and Tobago; Blackpool, Lancashire
- Genres: Soca, Afrosoca, Calypso
- Occupations: Singer, Songwriter
- Instruments: Vocals
- Years active: 2005–present
- Label: FOX FUSE

Olatunji Yearwood (born September 3, 1985), better known by his mononym Olatunji, is a Trinidadian soca artist.

== Career ==
Yearwood was born in Trinidad to Edward Yearwood, a well-known composer and mother Mairoon Ali, a Trinidadian actress, radio personality and teacher. He established himself as a Soca talent early on when he entered and won multiple talent shows while still in his teens, including the national Junior Calypso Monarch competition. His shot to global fame when he won Trinidad's famous Soca Groovy Monarch/International Soca Monarch in 2015, performing his blockbuster single "Ola." He is the last International Groovy Soca Monarch champion, as the competition's format was changed in 2016 to exclude that category.

Yearwood was featured in The Fader Magazine as the face of Afrosoca music, an emerging genre that fuses Soca and Afrobeats. He sees the release of his debut international album 'Awakening' on July 1, 2016, from FOX FUSE - the world's largest label for soca music.

In September 2018, Yearwood was featured as a contestant on The X Factor UK (Series 15). During his audition, a technical glitch resulted in the wrong backing track initially being played, however, once fixed, accompanied by two backup dancers, he went on to sing his original song called "Bodyline". His performance eventually resulted in a standing ovation from all four judges and, thus, four "yeses" allowing him to proceed to the next round. He made it to the live shows, and performed another bespoke song, "Jiggle It", but became the first contestant to be eliminated.

== Discography ==
=== Singles ===
- "Get Wild" 2007
- "Wine On Me" (2010)
- "Call Meh" (2011)
- "Wa Do" (2012)
- "Bam Bam (Taliban)" (2012)
- "Tadow" (2013)
- "Winning Good (Bharati Laraki)" (FOX FUSE, 2014)
- "Ola" (FOX FUSE, 2014)
- "Oh Yay" (FOX FUSE, 2015)
- "With Meh" (2015)
- "Seasonally" (2015)
- "Bang, Bang" (2015)
- "OLTL (One Life To Live)" featuring System32 (FOX FUSE, 2015)
- "Oh Yay Remix" featuring Runtown (FOX FUSE, 2016)
- "Tun Fo Meh" (FOX FUSE, 2016)
- "Bodyline" (FOX FUSE, 2017)
- "Mating Call" (FOX FUSE, 2018)
- "Thank Mama" (2018)
- "Angel" (2020)
- "Drunk History" (2020)
- "Engine Room" (2022)
- "Inventor (Iza Man)" (2023)
- "TLY (Trinidad Love You)" (2025)
- "She Tempo" (2025)
- "Capital" (2025)

=== Albums ===
- Awakening (FOX FUSE, 2016)
