= Pena de Pavão de Krishna =

Carnival block from Belo Horizonte, Brazil

- Foundation: 2013; 12 years ago
- Symbol: A peacock feather
- Location: Belo Horizonte

Pena de Pavão de Krishna (Portuguese for 'Krishna's Peacock's feather') is a carnival block in Belo Horizonte, Brazil. It was founded in 2013. The block parades in the Sunday of the carnival week playing Afoxê.

The block's themes are inspired in the Indian culture. One of its characteristics is the intonation of the Om mantra before rehearsals and the parade. Another is the adoption of violins as one of the main musical instruments. The block's name comes from lyrics of “Trilhos Urbanos”, a song from Caetano Veloso.

== History ==
The first parade happened in 2013 in the Floresta neighbourhood.

In 2014, the block expanded, and gathered around two thousand paraders, this time at Jardim América neighbourhood.

In 2015, the block gathered around 4 thousand paraders at Praça 15, in the Lagoinha neighbourhood, following towards Pedreira Prado Lopes. The parade in that year was the first to have a giant doll of Sri Krishna, weighing 37 kilos. It was brought by Tiago Pindaíba, also known as palhaço Pindaíba.
