= Shekere =

Percussion instrument from West Africa

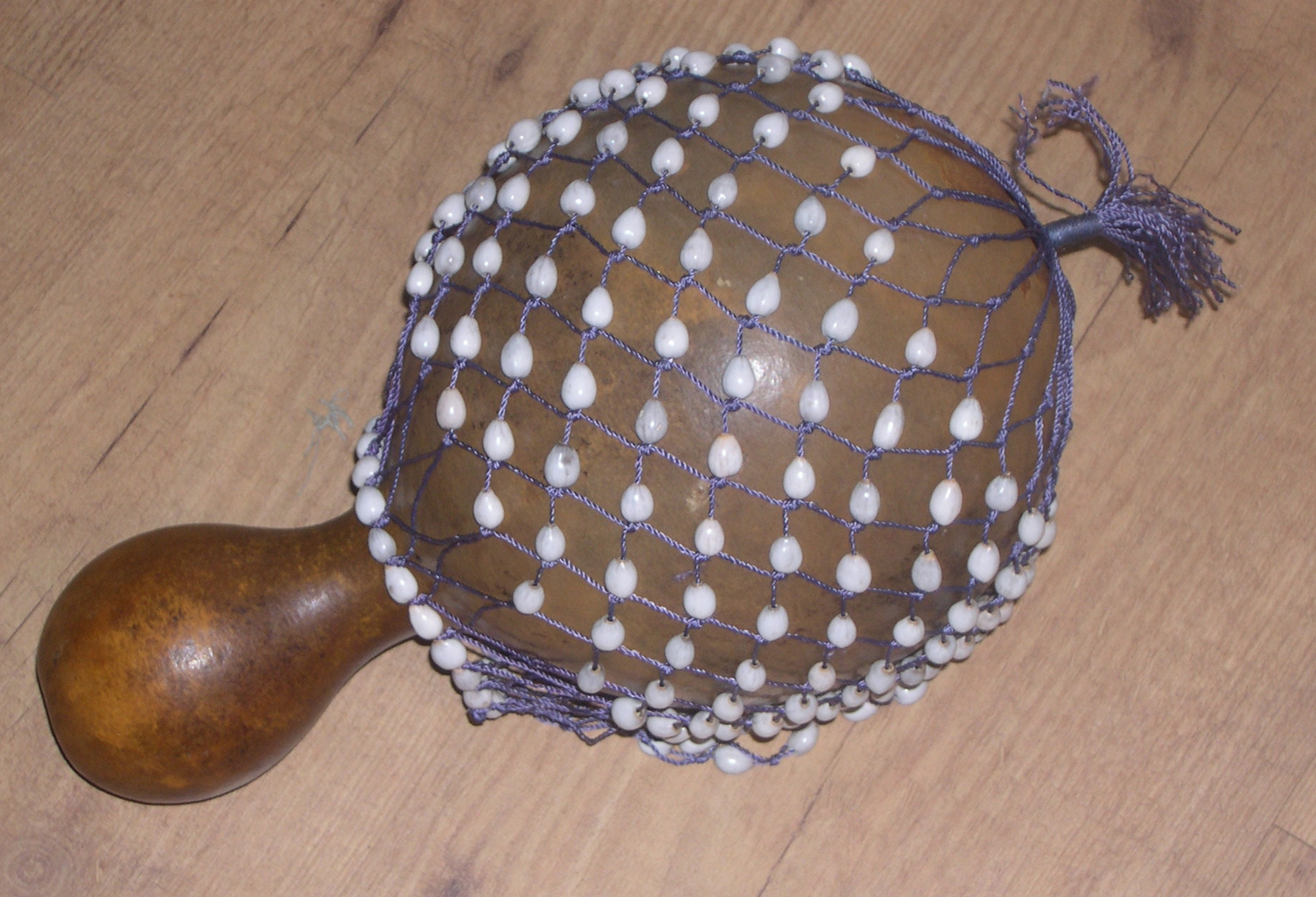
- Shekere

Percussion instrument
- Classification: Percussion
- Hornbostel–Sachs classification: idiophone

Related instruments
- Afoxé, Abwe

Musicians
- Madeleine Yayodele Nelson

The shekere (from Yoruba Ṣẹ̀kẹ̀rẹ̀) is a percussion instrument consisting of a dried gourd with beads or cowries woven into a net covering the gourd.

It originated from Ife kingdoms but later expanded during the old Oyo Empire. There are multiple ways to produce sounds with the instrument. It can be shaken or hit against the hand. The instrument can also rest in the palm of one hand while other hand holds the handle of the gourd. A twisting wrist motion is used so that the gourd moves while beads remain in place causing friction and sound different than when the instrument is simply shaken or struck. The shekere originated in Yorubaland in West Africa, which comprises the countries of Nigeria, Benin, and Togo.

While originating with the Yoruba people, the instrument is common throughout West Africa and Latin America and is central to folk music traditions of many cultures as well as being utilized within some popular music styles. In Ghana the instrument is referred to as axatse. In Latin America the instrument is commonly known as cabaça. Other names for the instrument include afuxê, afoxé, cabaca, cabasa, and cabaza depending on the language and culture.

The shekere is made from vine gourds that grow on the ground. The shape of the gourd determines the sound of the instrument. A shekere is made by drying the gourd for several months then removing the pulp and seeds. After it is scrubbed, skillful bead work is added as well as colour.

== Varieties ==
In Cuba, the chekeré, also known as aggué (abwe), is a large, hollow gourd (~50 cm long, approx. 19 1/2 in) almost entirely surrounded by a network of cords, to which many coloured beads are attached. Widely used in Afro-Cuban sacred and popular music, it may be twisted, shaken or slapped producing a subtle variety of effects; musically, it is more flexible than maracas.

In Brazil, this African gourd rattle is called a xequerê. It consists of the gourd (cabaça) cut in the middle and then wrapped in a net in which beads or small plastic balls are threaded. The afoxé is a similar, smaller instrument.

Shekere
Basic groove on shekere
