= Shannon Dudley =

American historian

Shannon Dudley is an American historian, focusing in ethnomusicology, Caribbean music, popular music, and national identity, currently the Adelaide D. Currie Cole Endowed Professor at the University of Washington.

== Published works ==
- Carnival Music in Trinidad: Experiencing Music, Expressing Culture (2003), ISBN 9780195138337, Oxford University Press.
