= Frankie McIntosh =

Saint Vincentian musician

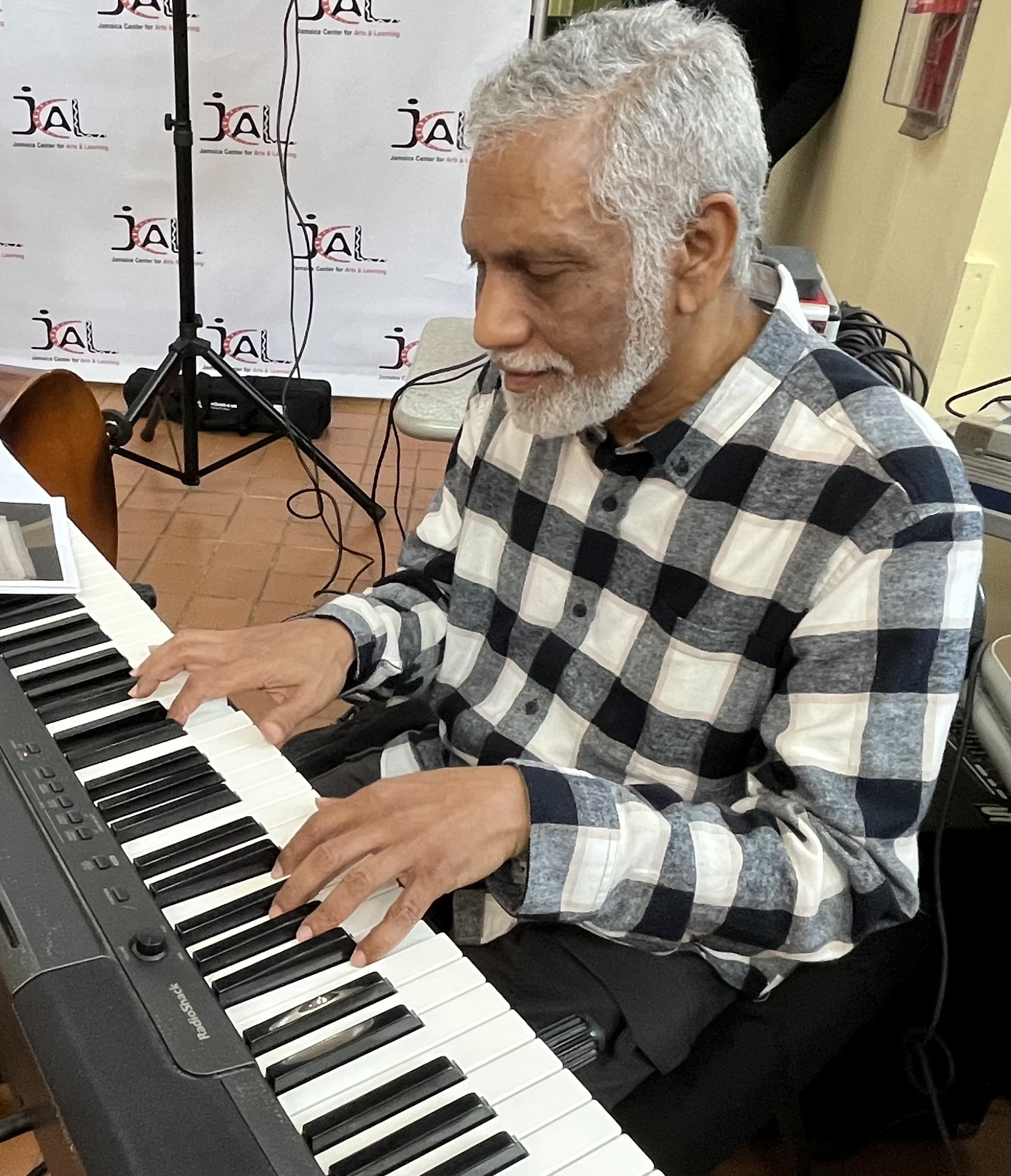

Background information
- Born: 1946 (age 79–80); Kingstown, St Vincent and the Grenadines
- Genres: Calypso, soca, jazz
- Occupations: Music arranger and pianist
- Instrument: Keyboards
- Years active: 1960–present
- Labels: Straker's Records, Charlie’s Records, B's Records

Franklyn McIntosh (born 1946) is a St Vincent-born pianist and arranger of calypso and soca music. He is recognized as one of the pioneer music arrangers who helped usher in the soca style of West Indian popular music in the 1970s and 1980s.

As a calypso/soca arranger, McIntosh scored out the music parts for the band that accompanies the calypso or soca singer. Melodic lines for horns (saxophone, trumpet, and sometimes trombone) and bass, as well as charts for guitars and keyboards, were written out for use by musicians at recording sessions and on the bandstand for live performances.

== Early life and musical training ==
Frankie McIntosh was born and reared in Kingstown, the capital city of the Caribbean nation St Vincent and the Grenadines. As a youngster he received musical instruction from his father, saxophonist and band leader Arthur McIntosh, and later classical piano lessons. At the age of ten he began playing in his father's calypso dance orchestra, the Melotones. He established his own band at the age of fourteen. After graduating from high school and a year's teaching English literature in a local intermediate secondary school, he relocated to Antigua in 1967 where he played piano for the popular Laviscount Combo. In 1968 McIntosh joined the wave of Caribbean immigrants who landed in Brooklyn, where he studied and earned a BA degree in classical piano from Brooklyn College (1978) and an MA in Jazz Studies from NYU (1988).

== Performing and arranging career in Brooklyn ==
While studying at Brooklyn College McIntosh made a living by playing with Brooklyn calypso dance orchestras led by Lio Smith and Syd Joe, and small jazz ensembles led by Jimmy Tyler, Snug Mosley, and Donald Maynard.

In 1977 he began his serious arranging career with calypsonian Alston “Becket” Cyrus. Their album, Disco Calypso, included one of Becket's biggest hits, “Coming High." Amsterdam News cultural critic Dawad Philip praised the song and McIntosh for his forward thinking "talent and musical Wizardy." A second song on the album, “Calypso Disco” made it onto the sound track of the 1977 Hollywood film The Deep.

In 1978 McIntosh joined forces with fellow St Vincent expatriate and record producer Granville Straker. Serving as musical director and leader of the studio band the Equitables, McIntosh composed musical arrangements and oversaw the recordings of hundreds of calypso/soca albums for Straker's Records as well as Brooklyn's two other calypso labels, Charlie's Records, and B's Records.

Over the next two decades McIntosh arranged for nearly every leading calypso/soca singer from the West Indies who came to New York to record and perform. Among his most notable collaborators from Trinidad were Mighty Sparrow, Lord Kitchener, Calypso Rose, Shadow, Chalk Dust, Duke, and Explainer. He also arranged for a number of so-called "small island" singers including Becket and Winston Soso from St Vincent and Short Shirt and Swallow from Antigua. Regarding Frankie's impact on the music, Nelson King, culture critic for the Vincentian and Caribbean Life, noted: "As the music moved into the 1980s, McIntosh emerged in the forefront of the new soca style, with arrangements famous for their innovative horn lines, catchy synthesizer figures, and sophisticated harmonic settings," Reviewing over a decade of work by McIntosh, critic Les Slater concluded: "McIntosh stands, along with Leston Paul, as the first among equals in the business of arranging calypso music which, as of the later 1970s, became a much bigger deal than it used to be.

In recent years McIntosh has returned to his jazz interests, playing in a small ensemble with steel panist Garvin Blake. He arranged Blake’s 2014 CD, Parallel Overtones, a recording that Les Slater noted: “exudes top-tier quality and finesse….It certainly is fine testament to Blake on both counts that the great Frankie McIntosh has been a collaborative presence for years on Blake’s music ventures."

During his Honorary Doctorate award ceremony, an official from the University of the West Indies summed up Frankie's accomplishments, proclaiming he had "an indestructible mark on authentic Caribbean music and ipso facto, bona fide Caribbean Culture. He was not constrained by nationality of other parochial interests in the deployment of his talent. With a totally Pan-Caribbean and Diasporic sensibility, he found time for teaching and assisting younger performers, arrangers, and musicians, not just the big popular names."

=== Noteworthy Soca/Calypso arrangements ===
- "Calypso Disco" by Alston Becket Cyrus (1977, Casablanca Records) - Appeared in the Hollywood Movie The Deep (https://www.youtube.com/watch?v=9XRIdhzDZbw)
- "Don't Back Back", by Sparrow (1984, Charlie's Records) - Won Trinidad Carnival Road March (https://www.youtube.com/watch?v=R7QJbb1pVk4&list=PLcldY-KYUdTwM_4E-rEr0IUnjWi1vaMYG&index=31
- "Is Thunder" by Duke (1987, Lem's Records) - Won Trinidad Carnival Road March (https://www.youtube.com/watch?v=IizX-cnOV_Q&list=PLcldY-KYUdTwM_4E-rEr0IUnjWi1vaMYG&index=23)
- "Things That Worry Me", "I Can't Make" by Chalkdust (1981, Starker Records) - Won Trinidad Calypso Monarch Competition (https://www.youtube.com/watch?v=9YocI5qdK7k)
- "Chauffeur Wanted", "Carnival Is the Answer" by Chalkdust (1989, Starker Records)- Won Trinidad Calypso Monarch Competition (https://www.youtube.com/watch?v=_J6qoL7btbo)
- "Fire in the Backseat" by Swallow (1988, Charlie's Records) - Won Best Calypso Arrangement in 1989 Caribbean Sunshine Awards (https://www.youtube.com/watch?v=6YOvjkL7sGI&list=PLcldY-KYUdTwM_4E-rEr0IUnjWi1vaMYG&index=13)
- "Teaser" by Alston Becket Cyrus (1990, Cocoa Records). - Won "Best Song and Best Arranged Song" at 1990 Caribbean Grammy Awards at the Apollo Theater (https://www.youtube.com/watch?v=SentvwWbfCM)
- "Lorraine" by Explainer (1981, Charlie's Records) - Reached 35 on the British Pop Charts (https://www.youtube.com/watch?v=aijYM34KZc4&list=PLcldY-KYUdTwM_4E-rEr0IUnjWi1vaMYG&index=25)
- "Push" by Short Shirt (1982, A& B Records) - Won Antigua Road March (https://www.youtube.com/watch?v=lST0eQS-z_U&list=PLcldY-KYUdTwM_4E-rEr0IUnjWi1vaMYG&index=9)
- "J'ouvert Rhythm" by Short Shirt (1987, WB Records) - Won Antigua Road March (https://www.youtube.com/watch?v=vWu8X2h10Ag)
- "World in Distress" by Short Shirt (1986, B's Records) - Won Antiguan Calypso King Competition (https://www.youtube.com/watch?v=IdbDcBwe4V8&list=PLcldY-KYUdTwM_4E-rEr0IUnjWi1vaMYG&index=11)
- "Independence" and "Fat Man Dance" by Obstinate (1981, Greenbay Records) - Won Antiguan Calypso King Competition (https://www.youtube.com/watch?v=qO0aHemnTGA&list=PLcldY-KYUdTwM_4E-rEr0IUnjWi1vaMYG&index=15)

== Awards and honors ==
- Honorary Doctorate from the University of the West Indies, 2021
- Sunshine Award Hall of Fame, 2015
- Commemorative Stamp from St Vincent and the Grenadines, 1997
- Trinidad and Tobago Folk Arts Institute Certificate of Appreciation, 1993
- Everybody's Magazine Calypso Arranger Award, 1992
- Arts and Culture Award from the Video Center of Arts Performances in Theaters, Brooklyn, NY, 1991
