= WCK =

WCK may refer to:

- Windward Caribbean Kulture, a Dominican band
- Wick railway station, Scotland (CRS code:WCK)
- World Central Kitchen, a food aid organization
- WCK, a radio station in Stix Baer & Fuller, a store in St. Louis, US
- Wild Cartoon Kingdom, a defunct American magazine
