= Mairoon Ali =

Mairoon Ali (1954 – 20 December 2009) was a Trinidadian actress and comedian. She frequently appeared in local theatre for almost twenty years. She was also a history teacher, who retired from Holy Name Convent after 34 years.

In the early 1990s, she became an on-air personality with several local radio stations. In recent years Ali became even more involved with the theatre and co-founded HaHaHa Productions with other local actresses Nikki Crosby and Penelope Spencer. Additionally, she also was the host of local television station Gayelle TV morning program.

== Life and career ==
Ali was born Christina Bradshaw to parents Editha and Lonsdale Bradshaw and grew up in Belmont with her parents and seven siblings. She attended Tranquility Government Primary School and later St. Francois Girls' College. She went on to teach at Holy Name Convent before becoming involved in the theatre. Upon marrying at age 18, she changed her name from Christina Bradshaw to Mairoon Ali and had her first child Aka Ali. Her second marriage was to calypsonian Eddie Yearwood. With Yearwood she had her second child, soca artist Olatunji Yearwood.

Ali developed as an actress, both on television and in local plays, performing with top actor/producers like Raymond Choo Kong and Richard Ragoobarsingh. In 2002, she won a National Drama Association Cacique award for most outstanding actress, and appeared in popular productions like Raymond Choo Kong's We Like It So!, The Best Little Whorehouse in Guapo (co-produced by HaHaHa Productions), and The Vagina Dialogues (which she also co-wrote). She also appeared on the local soap opera Westwood Park. She and Crosby created the iconic characters Mavis and Mabel, who appeared at many local shows including the WeBeat Festival and Copyright Music Organisation of Trinidad and Tobago (COTT) awards.

== Death ==
The night before her death, Ali was out with friends, returning home around 1:15am on the morning of 20 December 2009. She was expected to head to Grenada later that day to celebrate Christmas. Her body was discovered by her son about 10:30am. At first it was believed she had slipped and hit her head, but later an autopsy determined she had died of a cerebral haemorrhage.
