= Rhona Fox =

American actress and businesswoman

- Fox in New York City in July 2015
- Born: Essequibo, Guyana
- Occupations: Actress, Businesswoman
- Years active: 2009–present
- Spouse: Zack Cohen (m. 2016)
- Website: http://rhonafox.com

Rhona Fox is an American businesswoman of Indo-Guyanese descent who founded the soca music record label Fox Fuse. Fox was born in Essequibo, Guyana, raised in Nassau, Bahamas, and is based in New York City.

== Biography ==
Born in Essequibo, Guyana, Fox was raised in Nassau, Bahamas, where her parents were teachers. After graduating high school at 16, she journeyed to New York City, initially for a summer vacation. She eventually enrolled in college there, remaining after the conclusion of her studies.

Attaining a Bachelor of Arts Degree in Communication, Fox spent the first seven years of her career as a news promotion producer at ABC and FOX news affiliates, before becoming the Editor-In-Chief of Jamrock Magazine, a then nationally published Caribbean lifestyle and entertainment magazine. She then launched a music media-marketing firm named Fox Fuse, representing clients such as Pitbull, Lil Jon and Shaggy. In 2011, Fox Fuse evolved into a worldwide digital music distributor, thereby bringing Caribbean music to the global audience.

Working in entertainment offered a natural transition into acting for Fox, who told her mother since she was a five-year-old in Guyana that she will become an actress one day. Being surrounded by opportunities in New York forced her to make the leap towards fulfilling her ultimate dream. In addition to pursuing her acting dreams, Fox enjoys a vegan and cruelty-free lifestyle.

== Early career ==
Fox began her professional career as a TV News Promotion Producer, starting out in 2001 at WTEN Channel 10 in Albany, New York, then in 2004 moved to WXXA-TV FOX23 in Albany, New York. In 2005, Fox won the prestigious Telly Award in editing for a WXXA-TV sweeps promo on a news exposé on online pedophile stings.

In 2006, Fox became the editor of a nationally published Caribbean lifestyle magazine, Jamrock Magazine, in New York City. She has worked with numerous Caribbean superstars such as Wyclef Jean, Sean Paul and Shaggy, producing cover shoots and conducting interviews with them, along with rising Caribbean sensations, to raise their global profile.

== Music career ==
In 2007, Fox founded the music and media-marketing firm Fox Fuse and has represented artists like Pitbull, Lil Jon and Shaggy, over the years. Under Fox Fuse, she worked with Shaggy to launch his own record label Ranch Entertainment, on June 4, 2012. Meshing her TV experience with music, Fox ventured into directing music videos. She directed dancehall artist Gyptian's music video for his hit single, "I Can Feel Your Pain."

Fox was the publicist for the 'Best of the Best Concert' in Miami in 2009 and 2010, working with some of the biggest names in music including Diddy, Flo Rida, Rick Ross and Nicki Minaj. She served as the official spokesperson for the concert for those two years. From 2008 to 2010, Fox served as the personal publicist for soca star Machel Montano and worked extensively with him to bring soca music to mainstream radio and media, and the global audience. She traveled extensively with him across the United States and Caribbean, especially in his home country of Trinidad and Tobago, to brand him in core and international territories. From 2010 to 2011, Fox served as the Director of Publicity at VP Records and oversaw publicity for all the label's artists and projects, including Gyptian's breakout hit "Hold You," along with signature releases 'Reggae Gold' and 'Soca Gold' albums.

In 2011, Fox took on a partner at Fox Fuse, Zack Cohen, thereby expanding Fox Fuse, which has since evolved into a leading worldwide label for Caribbean music, with the first album released on February 21, 2012, by Trinidadian soca star, Farmer Nappy. Farmer Nappy credits Fox and Fox Fuse for expanding the reach of soca music globally.

Fox has continuously worked to bridge the gap between Caribbean music and the mainstream masses, through her work at Fox Fuse. In October 2012, Fox was interviewed by The Jamaica Observer in an exposé on the future of reggae music and collaborated with hit producers Thomas Wesley Pentz AKA Diplo (DJ) and Shama Joseph AKA Sak Pase for the piece.

In July 2015, Fox was interviewed by Billboard in an article on the international success of pop star Rihanna and the ensuing growth of Caribbean music, especially in her homeland of Barbados. Fox Fuse is cited in the piece as being the "world’s largest distributor of Cropover music." In August 2015, the Daily News (New York) stated that Fox Fuse "is currently the world’s largest music label for contemporary soca music."

== Acting career ==
Fox's first acting gig placed her on the set of the Rocawear 10th Anniversary commercial in August 2009, where she was directed by Spike Lee. She was cast as the principal in a regional TV promotion for cross-branding between iPod and Seinfeld for its syndication on FOX, appearing as the wacky, dancing Elaine character from Seinfeld. She also received print placement atop the national Yahoo.com homepage, appearing as a dentist in Yahoo’s top story. Additionally, Fox gained priceless experience by working as a stand-in for the top Indian actresses in Hollywood, including Priyanka Chopra in Quantico (ABC), Mindy Kaling in The Mindy Project (FOX), Archie Panjabi in The Good Wife (CBS), Sarita Choudhury in Blindspot (NBC) and Reshma Shetty in Royal Pains (USA).

Fox scored her first speaking role in the pilot of the ‘Untitled Wall Street Project,’ acting in a scene opposite Maggie Grace in the John Cusack-fronted drama series for CBS. She was handpicked by Martin Scorsese to be featured in the final shot of his blockbuster flick The Wolf of Wall Street, where she was directed by the iconic director himself. She also had minor roles in Law & Order (NBC) and Made in Jersey (CBS), where the director liked her name and had it added to the script for her character's name. Fox is currently developing independent projects along with other upcoming talents and has several feature and short film projects currently in production.

== Filmography ==
Television

Year	Show	Network	Role	Notes
2009	Law & Order	NBC	Juror	Episode: "Human Flesh Search Engine"
2013	Made in Jersey	CBS	Rhona	Episode: "Pilot"
2014	Untitled Wall Street Project	CBS	Assistant	Episode: "Pilot"

== Philanthropy ==
On September 12, 2015, Fox hosted the third annual Indo-Caribbean Alliance charity gala in Flushing, New York, a fundraiser to support community outreach and educational programs for the local Caribbean community in Queens, New York.

== Recognition ==
Fox received The Rising Sun Award at the Caribbean Heritage Organization's 'Tribute to Hollywood & The Arts Gala' in Universal City, California on June 21, 2013. She was recognized as the emerging actor of Caribbean heritage for that year.

In October 2013, she was the cover story for GEM (Guyana Entertainment Magazine) for its “Guyana’s 40 Under 40” edition, and has received coverage in all the national publications in her native country. She was featured in Guyana's top newspaper, Stabroek News, on the cover of its entertainment supplement The Scene, in September 2013. She was also featured on the cover of SYM Magazine in New York City, in 2012.

In June 2012, she was won the Golden Arrowhead Award from Guyana during a ceremony hosted by the Guyana Consulate in New York City. She was also presented with a Proclamation from the City of New York for her contribution to the arts.

In 2005, Fox won the Telly Award in editing for a WXXA-TV sweeps promo on a news exposé on online pedophile stings.

== See also ==
- Indians in the New York City metropolitan region
