= Accordion band =

Accordion band may refer to:

- Any band that uses an accordion prominently, or is made up entirely of accordions
- A Dominican jing ping band
