= Granville Straker =

American record producer and label owner (1939–2026)

Granville Straker (September 12, 1939 – August 27, 2026) was a Saint Vincent-born American music businessman and record producer who specialized in calypso music. He is known for his Brooklyn, New York-based record label Straker's Records, which he founded in 1969, as well as his production work for many of the artists signed to it. According to Mark Romano of AllMusic, Straker's Records "...defined major calypso and soca artists starting in the early '70s." Straker told record producer and researcher Bill Nowlin that over a thirty year span his label released 600 to 700 albums, in excess of 1000 twelve inch records, and several thousand singles.

== Life and career ==
Straker first moved to Brooklyn from Trinidad in 1959. In 1969, he founded the calypso-centered record label Straker's Records with his first recording of a Brooklyn based Vincentian Combo called "Sounds Inc" producing two 45 rpm singles. Around the same time, in response to the growing popularity of Caribbean music in Brooklyn, he set up several record stores in the area. Among the dozens of noteworthy calypsonians who released albums on Straker's Records were Shadow, Chalkdust, Calypso Rose, Lord Melody, Black Stalin, Mighty Duke, Explainer, and Lord Nelson. Straker was also active as a talent scout and concert promoter, and he frequently traveled to Trinidad to look for new calypso musicians. In 1978, fellow Vincentian Frankie McIntosh began working for Straker as his musical director. In this capacity, McIntosh wrote the musical arrangements for many of Straker's artists, and oversaw hundreds of recording sessions for calypsonians backed by the studio band the Equitables.

As of 1999, he was still running his record store, Straker's Records & Stereo, from the same location in Brooklyn since it was founded 27 years earlier.

Straker died on August 27, 2026, at the age of 86.
