= Wilder =

Wilder may refer to:

== People ==
- Wilder (name), including a list of people with the name

== Places ==
=== Austria ===
- Kaisergebirge, also called Wilder Kaiser, a ski area in Austria

=== United States ===
- Wilder, Idaho
- Wilder, Kansas
- Wilder, Kentucky
- Wilder, Minnesota
- Wilder, Tennessee
- Wilder, Vermont

== Arts and entertainment ==
- Wilder (album), a 1981 album by The Teardrop Explodes
- Wilder (Dungeons & Dragons), a character class in Dungeons & Dragons
- Wilder (The Wheel of Time), a collective term for an untrained female magic-user in The Wheel of Time series by Robert Jordan
- Wilder (TV series), a 2017 Swiss crime drama featuring police detective Rosa Wilder

== See also ==
- Wilders (disambiguation)
