= Zack Cohen =

American music manager

- Born: Zachary Cohen; Manhattan, New York City, United States
- Occupation: Music manager
- Years active: 2010–present
- Employer: Fox Fuse

Zachary Cohen is an American music manager. In August 2015, the Daily News (New York) stated that Fox Fuse "is currently the world’s largest music label for contemporary soca music." As the CEO of Fox Fuse, Cohen oversees distribution, licensing, bookings, and artist management, alongside Rhona Fox.

Cohen previously served as the Licensing Manager at VP Records, representing both the Greensleeves Records and VP Records catalogs. He was the first Licensing Manager at VP Records. He also served as A&R of 'Soca Gold: The Ultimate Collection,' released by VP Records on September 13, 2011.
