= Madeleine Yayodele Nelson =

American percussionist and composer (1948–2018)

- Born: September 16, 1948; Pittsburgh, Pennsylvania, U.S.
- Died: September 6, 2018 (aged 69)
- Education: B.S. (education), Slippery Rock University of Pennsylvania
- Occupations: Musician, educator, guest artist
- Children: Ayodele Nelson

Madeleine Yayodele Nelson (September 16, 1948 – September 6, 2018) was an American percussionist and composer. She specialized in playing the West African shekere. She also played the djembe drum, the mbira thumb piano and the calabash.

She was the founder and director of Women of the Calabash, founded in 1978. The calabash is a gourd that comes from a fruit from Africa. Women of the Calabash gets its influences from Africa and the African Diaspora. Women of the Calabash is an ensemble percussion group that draws inspiration from sub-Sahara Africa, the Caribbean and South and North America using their own interpretations. She handcrafted shekeres, including for the Broadway show Fela!, in New York City and in London.

== Career ==
Nelson taught shekere classes for 41 years for DanceAfrica in New York City on Saturdays. She taught music for the Fresh Air Fund camp, Symphony Space in New York City and in Guyana. She taught at Symphony Space in New York City's educational program teaching children and adults.

She taught for public schools in Pennsylvania and in New York as a teaching artist.

Nelson performed as a solo artist with Paul Simon, Edie Brickell, Billy Harper and Timbila.

She was the director and founder of Women of the Calabash. The musical group draws inspiration from Africa and the African Diaspora. The group shared the stage with the Temptations, Richie Havens, Philip Glass, Odetta, Max Roach, Ashford & Simpson and others. They were a touring performing company under Nelson's leadership. The group performed at clubs, theaters, festivals, and schools.

The Women of the Calabash recorded The Kwanzaa album that honors Kwanzaa, a week-long celebration of African-American culture in December of each year. The album was released in 2000 by Bermuda Reef Records. Members of the group include vocalists/percussionists Marsha Perry Starkes, Mayra Casales, Joan Ashley, Caren Calder, Ahmondylla Best, Pam Patrick and Ti'Ye Giraud.

Nelson worked and performed with many groups and artists; mbiraNYC, Kalunga, Alakande, Vivian Warfield, Zauditu Chambers, Dawn Drake, Rhodessa Goings and Gabriella Dennery.

== Film and television ==
- 1987 – Women of the Calabash appeared in a television documentary by Skip Blumberg. They performed African and African Diaspora rhythms, and South African protest songs.
- 1995 – Marlon Riggs' Black Is Black Ain’t
- The American Bible Society's – The Visit.

== Musical style ==
- West African Tradition
- Afro-Latin
- Afro-Beat
- African diaspora
- Ethnic fusion

== Instruments ==
- Shekere
- African drums
- Mbira
- Cajón

== Discography ==
- 2004–Raven: The Classics–Gabrielle Roth
- 1998–The Kwanzaa Album–Women Of The Calabash
- 1995–Tongues–Gabrielle Roth & the Mirrors
- 1994–Picture Perfect Morning–Edie Brickell
- 1994–Raven Records
- 1993–Somalia–Billy Harper
- 1991–Waves–Gabrielle Roth & the Mirrors
- 1990–The Rhythm of the Saints–Paul Simon
- 1989–Bones–Gabrielle Roth & the Mirrors
