= Bouyon music =

Music genre

Bouyon
- Stylistic origins: Jing ping; Cadence-lypso; traditional dances (bèlè, quadrille, Chanté mas, lapo kabwit); Mazurka; Zouk
- Cultural origins: Late 1980s, Roseau (Dominica)
- Typical instruments: Tambour bélé; tambou lélé; lapo kabwit; chakchak (maracas); syak or gwaj (scraper-rattle); tambal or tanbou (tambourine); accordion; acoustic drums; rhythmic guitar; keyboards

Fusion genres
- Bouyon soca; Bouyon-muffin; Alternative bouyon; Bouyon Hybrid

Other topics
- Music of Dominica; Jing ping; Cadence-lypso; Windward Caribbean Kulture

Bouyon (pronunciation: boo-your) is a genre of Dominican music that originated in Dominica in the late 1980s. Prominent bouyon groups include Windward Caribbean Kulture (WCK); Roots, Stems and Branches (RSB); and First Serenade.

"Hardcore bouyon", also called "Gwada-Bouyon," is another type of bouyon, different from the Dominican genre, which began through musical collaborations between citizens of Dominica and Guadeloupe, who both speak Antillean Creole. The term bouyon means something akin to "gumbo soup" or "coubouyon poisson" (a typical Caribbean dish) in Antillean Creole. Bouyon music is a mix of traditional and modern music, and is popular across much of the Caribbean.

== Origin ==
Bouyon blends jing ping, cadence-lypso and traditional dances, namely bèlè, quadrille, chanté mas and lapo kabwit, mazurka, zouk and other styles of Caribbean music.

== Offshoots ==
=== Jump up ===
In 1987, Exile One recorded a Chanté mas and Lapo Kabwit song, "L'hivernage", commonly referred to as the yo. The French Antilleans referred to the beat as "jump up music" because of its carnival style sound. This jump upbeat was later modified to become bouyon or modern soca music. (As printed on Exile One's album "creole attitude"). In Guadeloupe and Martinique, "Jump up" refers generally to bouyon music.

=== Bouyon soca ===
Bouyon soca is a fusion-genre that blends bouyon and soca music.

=== Bouyon-muffin ===
A modern offshoot of bouyon is bouyon-muffin. It combines elements of Jamaican raggamuffin music, hip hop, and dancehall. The most influential figure in the development of bouyon-muffin is "Skinny Banton" (now known as "Shadowflow") who from 1995 collaborated with the WCK band, using ragga influenced vocals to chant on top of bouyon rhythms.

== See also ==
- Cadence-lypso
- Jing ping
- Music of Dominica
- Windward Caribbean Kulture
- World Creole Music Festival
