= Afoxé (musical instrument) =

Afro-Brazilian percussion instrument

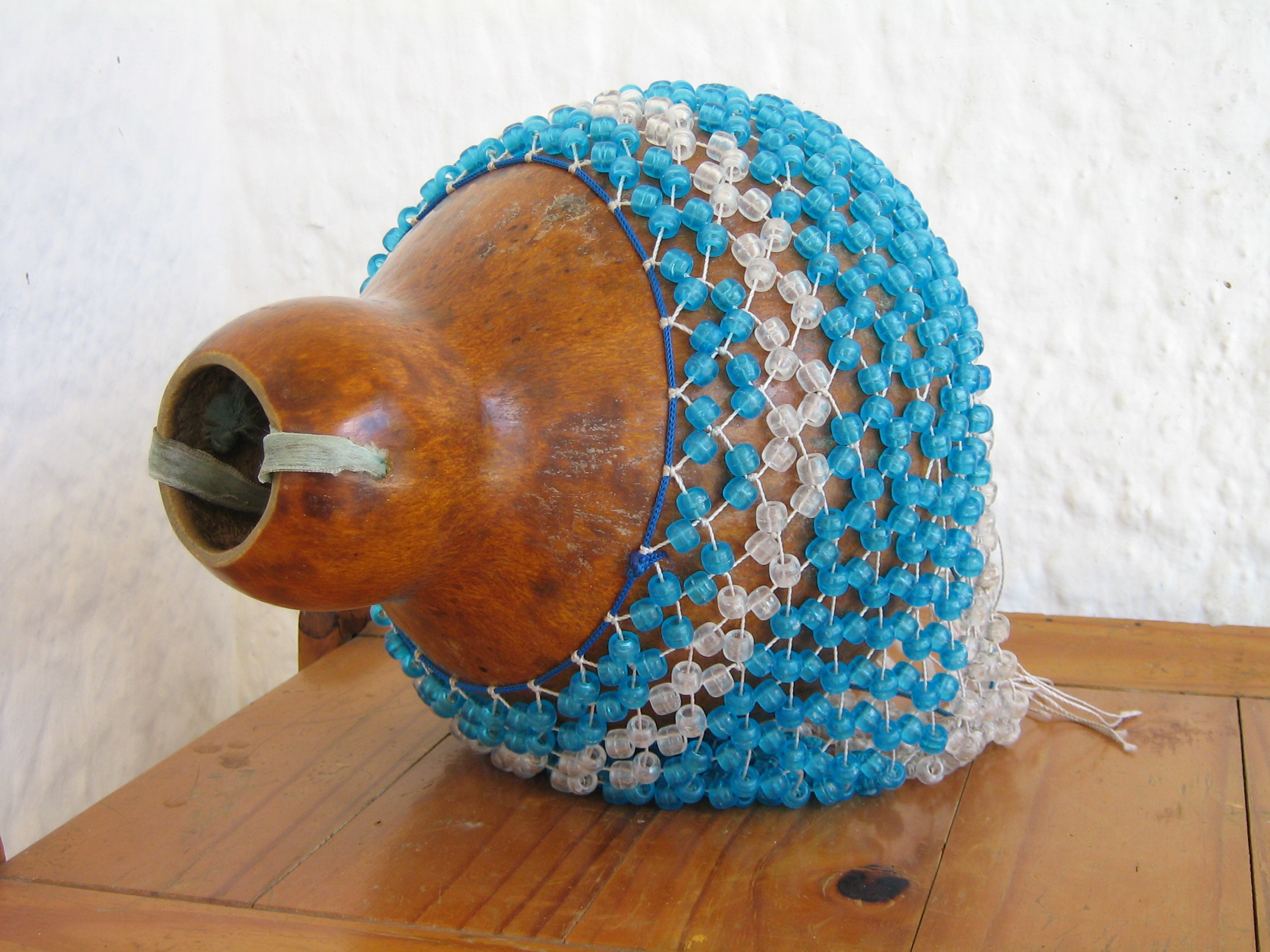

Percussion instrument
- Other names: Afoxe'
- Classification: Idiophone
- Hornbostel–Sachs classification: 112.122 (Sliding rattles)
- Developed: Brazil

The afoxé (also known as the cabaça or cabaca) is an Afro-Brazilian unpitched percussion instrument in the idiophone family. It is composed of a hollowed vessel wrapped in a net through which beads or seeds are threaded.

Afoxé is Afro-Brazilian music and culture that performs during the Carnival in Salvador, Bahia. The Afoxé is composed of percussion-based music with the use of religious symbols from the Afro-Brazilian religion called Candomblé which is derived from the Yoruba world view. As such, the Afoxé groups march through the streets of Salvador, Bahia during Brazilian Carnival and perform the Ijexá rhythmical pattern of music which is directly related to the sacred drumming traditions found within the Candomblé ceremonies.

While Afoxé is generally recognized within the context of the Carnival celebration, researchers are beginning to document its origins in Afro-Brazilian religion and as an important vehicle for the public expression of Afro-Brazilian identity. The procession format for Afoxé allows for the adaptation of traditional orisha (Candomblé spirits) rituals and costumes into formats suitable for public display. As one of the largest and most influential Afoxé groups, Filhos de Gandhy was formed in 1949 and has become a key element in defining the modern-day Afoxé procession.

Researchers have defined Afoxé as both an African music practice (ritualistic) and a cultural institution that provides an interface between the sacred ritualism of the Afro-Brazilian community and the secular festival atmosphere of Carnaval celebrations. Afoxé has provided a venue for increasing awareness of Afro-Brazilian religious traditions nationally and internationally through its involvement in Carnaval celebrations, and also provides a cultural platform for the community to express their identity.

== Beginnings of the instrument ==
The afoxé likely originated from the shekere, a similar percussion instrument from West Africa. As enslaved West African people were brought to Brazil, they replicated the shekere using materials that were readily available to them, such as gourds and coconut seeds. Modern afoxés are often mass-produced and made from wood.

== Etymology ==
The use of the term "afoxé" is used to describe both the instrument (beaded gourd shakers) used in Afro-Brazilian ensemble percussion and the Carnival procession traditions they are a part of. In terms of instrumentation, the term may refer to an individual beaded gourd shaker which produces a specific type of rhythmic pattern called ijexá when played by an ensemble. Because the terminology is so directly tied to the instrument, the rhythms it plays, and the format for each procession, the sounds from the shaker have become synonymous with the specific ijexá rhythmic patterns used to create the music during public parades. As a result, the term has evolved over time to specifically describe the organized Carnival groups that perform Afro-Brazilian religiously derived music in Salvador, Brazil.

== History ==
=== Early delopment in Salvador ===
Ritual drumming was an important part of Candomblé ceremonial rituals in Afro-Brazilian communities that were developing in Salvador, Bahia during the end of the nineteenth and beginning of the twentieth century. At this time, these drumming practices began to enter public celebrations for Carnival. This entry into public celebrations was an example of larger societal trends that were allowing Afro-Brazilian communities to gain a stronger presence in public spaces that had previously been used primarily as spaces for elite celebrations.

When sacred music was adapted to be played in public Carnival processions, it was not a complete loss of its spiritual significance. Instead, Afoxé maintained the use of some musical elements such as rhythmic structure, symbolic gestures and costume designs that were developed through ritual practice but presented in ways that allowed for broader audiences to participate.

=== Founding of Fihos de Gandhy (1949) ===
Filhos de Gandhy, established in 1949, was an extremely important period for Afoxé as an institution. This is because Filhos de Gandhy were responsible for organizing the first Afoxé parade in Salvador and creating the framework for all future parades. Filhos de Gandhy had also established their own identity with the white robes and turban and it is believed they were influenced by the visual representation of Mahatma Gandhi; a symbol of peace from across the world combined with Afro-Brazilian spirituality.

Filhos de Gandhy's popularity was instrumental in establishing Afoxé as one of the major traditions at Carnival. They standardized music, the way the processions are arranged and the symbolic nature of the costumes which has been duplicated by many of the other Afoxé groups today.

=== Expansion in the late 20th century ===
The growth of the bloco afro movement in Salvador during the latter half of the 20th Century, was significant in the increasing popularity of Afro-Brazilian musical expressions. Although, Afoxé differs greatly from other Afro-Brazilian carnival expression (Banda de Ile) the increase in interest and involvement of the larger groups celebrating black culture; has also contributed to the increased awareness of Afoxé, as a vital component of the Bahian cultural scene due to the increased academic interest and media attention.

Although, Afoxé was developed in parallel with other elements of the broader bloco afro movement in Salvador, it is distinct from them. Bloco afro movements generally focus on using music and parades to represent Afro-Brazilian identity, history and consciousness, whereas Afoxé movements are much more directly connected to the rituals of Candomblé and the symbolic aspects of religion. Academic studies have indicated that Afoxé has a greater degree of connection to the musical and cosmological aspects of temple based traditions than do most Afro-bloco movements (through Afoxé's continued use of ijexá rhythms and continued use of a ritual procession format).

== Religious foundations ==
=== Candomblé cosmology ===
The religious origin of Afoxé comes from Candomblé which is an Afro-Brazilian religion that uses elements of worshiping spirits (Orixá) from the Yoruba people in Africa. Candomblé is based on the Yoruba belief that there is no separation between the divine and human aspects of nature. Rhythms such as drums, chant and dance are all ways that Candomblé practitioners use to contact and pay homage to the Orixá.

The way that Candomblé organizes its community is similar to the way that Afoxé is organized in relation to its cosmological beliefs. Scholars have also demonstrated that the pattern of the drums and the movements of the dancers during the Afoxé parade are directly related to the Candomblé ceremonies. However, the Afoxé parade is a representation of the ceremonial activities of the Candomblé temple and not a representation of the actual ceremony. The rhythm of the drums, the movement of the dancers and the invocation of the Orixá in the parade are forms of continued religious expression.

=== Sacred and secular adaptation ===
The use of religious music in the context of Carnival has been a key example of cultural adaptation. Instead of eliminating the religious aspects of their performances, many Afoxé groups maintain these symbolic elements in their performances of costumed processionals, choreographed movements, and musical structures that are reflective of their religious origins.

This type of adaptation can be seen by researchers as an attempt to find some middle ground in terms of the traditional and cultural expressions of religious practice and the secular celebrations of public festivals. This ability to function in both ways at once has blurred the line for many between rituals and entertainment.

== Musical structure and performance practice ==
=== Rhythm ===
Ijexá, a rhythmic pattern used in Afoxé performances, is based upon an established rhythmic pattern that is characterized as a steady syncopation of the rhythmic pulse; this rhythmic pattern has its origins within Candomblé's use of the drum in rituals. The ijexá rhythmic pattern is commonly created and maintained through the use of multiple percussionists while providing call-and-response patterns vocally by participants; these call-and-response patterns allow for each participant to engage with the performance collectively which is an example of the many African music traditions used throughout the Afro-Atlantic world.

The ije exa rhythmic pattern of Afoxé performances is distinguished by an unbroken flow of rhythm with accentuation through layering syncopation on the percussion. The rhythmic accompaniment to the movements of the procession and typically provides the rhythmic frame for call-and-response vocal exchange between participants. The rhythmic form is based upon traditional Candomble drumming forms; therefore it demonstrates that there are connections between religious ceremony and Carnival performance.

=== Instrumentation ===
The majority of the percussion instruments that are used by afoxé ensembles derive from traditional Candomblé drums and other percussion instruments. The atabaque is an example of such an instrument which is widely used as the primary rhythmic base in Candomblé ceremonies; the agogô (bells) produce complex rhythmic interplay; while the afoxé shaker (a beaded gourd instrument) adds rhythmic accents and textural elements to the ensemble. This instrumentation creates a layering effect of rhythm which aids in supporting the musical performance while also providing support for the movement of participants in a procession.

Research into Afro-Brazilian percussion has shown a clear connection between the use of percussion instruments during rituals in Candomblé and their use in afoxé performances during Carnival celebrations. In fact, it has been documented that many of the names of the percussion instruments, the playing techniques used on those instruments and the specific rhythmic roles played by each of the percussion instruments have maintained their connections to Candomblé religion even when they were presented in a public festival setting.

=== Choreography and costume ===
The processions of an Afoxé procession are formatted using a combination of choreographed movement and symbolically dressed participants. The majority of the procession moves in line and/or formation, while keeping time with the percussion ensemble. For example, in the case of Filhos de Gandhy, white clothing and turbans act as visible identifiers of the group, and also serve as visual representations of peace and spiritual purity.

The costumed and choreographed performances provide an additional link between religious symbolism and public performance; however, they have been adapted from their original religious context, to be performed during the Carnival celebrations, while still retaining many of the aesthetic characteristics developed within the African Brazilian religious traditions.

== Cultural and political significance ==
=== Afro-Brazilian identity ===
Scholars have interpreted Afoxé as a key vehicle for the affirmation of Afro-Brazilian identity. In addition to providing the music and symbols of Afro-Brazilian religions at one of the largest and most visible national celebrations in Brazil, it has contributed to the growing awareness of the Black cultural heritage. The use of Afoxé during Carnaval is a challenge to the long-standing marginalization of Afro-Brazilian religious traditions and emphasizes the importance of these traditions to Brazilian cultural history.

=== Diasporic framework ===
While some researchers have placed Afoxé into a broad transdiasporic context as a way of highlighting its relationship with other aspects of Yoruba culture throughout the Atlantic world, the continuation of African rhythms, cosmological beliefs, and performative structures, as practiced by Afoxé, demonstrates another example of the cultural continuity that exists within the African diaspora.

In addition to this perspective, Afoxé is an important part of many local cultural practices in Salvador; however, it can also be considered as part of a larger global network of music and religious expression of Afro-Atlantic communities. Afoxé performances during Carnival provide a visible example of the interaction between preserving the past (heritage) and producing new culture today.

=== Notable groups ===
Filhos de Gandhy is the largest known Afoxé group; it was formed in 1949 in Salvador and continues to be a major force at Carnival as well as one that influences the Afoxé groups that are developing today. The additional Afoxé groups have continued to perform at Carnival in Salvador, while continuing to adhere to the traditional music and rituals of Afoxé.

Afoxé groups remain active participants in the celebration of Carnival in Salvador, as well as a continuation of traditional music, dance and symbolism; and also as an adaptation to the current cultural environment. In addition to the visual presence of Afoxé during Carnival, this visual presence continues to generate ongoing academic study and scholarship on Afro-Brazilian religion and music.

== Sound production ==
Typically, the afoxé is played by rotating the handle so that the beads or seeds rub against the outside of the instrument. It can also be played by shaking, striking, and other techniques.Afoxés are known for creating a loud, sharp noise.

== Usage ==
Afoxés are traditionally used in Afoxê music, typically performed at Carnival street processions. Additionally, it is played in a variety of other genres, including Brazilian popular music, Latin American dance bands, and orchestral music.
