= Windward Caribbean Kulture =

WCK (Windward Caribbean Kulture)
- Origin: Roseau, Dominica
- Genres: Bouyon; Soca zouk World music
- Years active: 1987 – Present

The WCK Band (Windward Caribbean Kulture) was formed in 1988 in Dominica. The band played a blend of the local Cadence-lypso and traditional Jing ping, Chante mas and lapo kabwit rhythms, which would later be labelled bouyon, a genre which they are credited with creating in the late 1980s.

== History ==
WCK or Windward Caribbean Kulture, was formed in 1988 by a group of young Dominican musicians. This group came together to fill a void left by several of Dominica's most internationally recognized bands, such as Exile One, Grammacks and the French Antilles Kassav'. The band heralded in a resurgence of live music and created a new wave in Dominica's musical evolution. They began experimenting with a fusion of cadence-lypso and Jing ping. While the cadence-lypso sound is based on the creative use of acoustic drums, an aggressive up-tempo guitar beat and strong social commentary in the native Creole language, the new sound created by WCK focused more on the use of technology with a strong emphasis on keyboard rhythmic patterns.

Wck made its debut in 1988 with an album titled One More Sway, which coincided with the Reunion Year (10th anniversary) Independence celebrations. The next album, 1990's Culture Shock, was probably the defining moment for the band. The album included tracks such as "Culture Shock" and "Dance Floor".

The albums that followed showed the creative growth of the band throughout the years. In 1991, the Follow the Leader album delivered signature tracks such as "Follow the Leader" and "Land Of Sunshine". In 1992, the release of Kannibal was another step towards the fine-tuning of this new sound. The 1993 release FOREVER produced one of the band's biggest hits, "Conch Shell/Vola Vole" or "The Fish Song" (as it was popularly called). In 1995, the band released its most successful album, Tou Cho Tou Flam, which generated seven hits out of the 11-track album, one of which was the huge hit "Balance Batty", which remains popular to this day. By the launch of the band's seventh album, Original Hold Dem, WCK were at the apotheosis of their popularity. That album contained popular tracks like "Mete Veye", "Original Hold Dem", "Nomn La" and "Preg Dance See".

To establish their musical strength, prowess and creativity, the band toured the US, Canada, Europe and the Caribbean from 1995 – 1998. They packed dance halls, concert halls, arenas and any open space they played. That set the stage for the next two albums, Too Many Cooks & Marathon, which propelled the band and its bouyon music into the international spotlight. The reception of their 1999 release Set My People Free demonstrated their continuing popularity.

The 2000 release, Pride and Joy featured tracks such as “The Buzz", "Grand Finale" and title track "Pride & Joy". They followed this up with the well-received Caribbean Heartbeat. In 2002 the band then released On Top. Hits “Emotions" and "Joy Ride" featured T.C from Barbados. Their 2003 album More Music included hits such as "Send your body" and title track "More music". 2004 marked the band's release of their most anticipated album to date, titled www.wck.dm, which featured the hit “rollin”. Follow up albums included Calling and One Boss, which were released in 2007 and 2008 respectively.

== Discography ==
- 1988 One More Sway
- 1990 Culture Shock
- 1991 Follow The Leader
- 1992 Kannibal
- 1993 Forever
- 1994 Traitors On Board
- 1995 Tou Cho Tou Flam
- 1996 Original Hold Dem
- 1997 Too Many Cooks
- 1998 Marathon
- 1999 Set My People Free
- 2000 Pride & Joy
- 2001 Caribbean Heartbeat
- 2002 Ontop
- 2003 More Music
- 2004 www.Wck.Dm
- 2006 Calling
- 2007 One Boss
- 2010 Superband
- 2011 Native Crew

== Hit Singles ==
- Culture Shock – 1990
- Follow the Leader – 1991
- Conch Shell/Vola – 1993
- Modie Maco – 1994
- Tou chou Tou flam – 1995
- Balance Batty - 1995
- Mete Veye’ - 1996
- Drum song - 1996
- Iron – 1997
- Kulture nous – 1997
- Pots & Pans – 1997
- Marathon – 1998
- Riddim like rain – 1998
- Bouyon Connection - 1998
- Set my people free – 1999
- Mic Rah Phone – 1999
- The buzz - 2000
- Pride & joy – 2000
- Grand Finale – 2000
- Bouncing – 2001
- Track after track - 2001
- Put A Hand - 2002
- Emotions – 2002 (feat Terencia Coward-"TC")
- Joy Ride – 2002 (feat Terencia Coward-"TC")
- Ontop - 2002
- More Music – 2003
- Send your body – 2003
- Rolling – 2004
- Back Together Again - 2005
- Best Wuk up – 2006
- Hold Dem -2010
- I In Dat - 2010 (Feat Claudette "CP" Peters)
- Must Go On - 2011
- 767-2013
- Jus Do - 2015

== Former Band Members ==
- Cornell "Fingaz" Phillip..........(Keyboards/Lead Vocals)
- Irvine "Smokey" Phillip..........(Keyboards)
- Ashton Lugay........................(Guitar)
- Martindale Olive...................(Lead Guitar/Lead Vocal)
- Derick "Rah" Peters...............(Drums/Lead Vocals)
- Neijel A. Jno Baptiste a.k.a "Nayee" ....... (Lead Vocals/Keyboards)
- Dennison Joseph a.k.a "Dice"..... (Lead Vocals)
- Wayne "Skinny Banton" Robinson a.k.a "Shadowflow"....(Lead Vocals)
- Clint Henderson a.k.a "Charm Daddy".....(Lead Vocals/Keyboards)
- Delton Alfred a.k.a "Delly"...... (Lead Vocals)
- Pellam Jno Baptiste................(Drums)
- Bert Castonguay....................(Keyboards/Lead Vocals)
- Keith Goddard ... bass guitar
- Wayne McLawrence... guitar
- Kenneth Toussaint... lead guitar
- Earlson Matthew a.k.a Likkle Man....lead Keyboardist
- Edmund Telemacque a.k.a Chum Dada... (Lead Vocals)
