= Wilders =

Wilders or The Wilders may refer to:

- Wilders (surname)
- Wilders, Indiana, U.S., a town
- "Wilders", a song by Japanese singer Arisa Mizuki from Arisa II: Shake Your Body for Me
- The Wilders, a member of Pride supervillain team by Marvel Comics

== See also ==
- Wilder (disambiguation)
