= Haitian gospel =

Music genre

Haitian gospel music, began its roots in the rise of Christianity, when it was first imported to the island by Spain's Christopher Columbus in the 15th-century and again by the French during colonial years of Saint-Domingue, as Jesuits and Capuchins served as missionaries to continue the proliferation of Catholicism. The Baptist trend that had grown in the United States, had not yet reached Haiti until the western media was introduced, shaping Haitian gospel music; also known as mizik levanjil in Haitian Creole.

== Origins ==
After the Haitian Revolution of 1804, Protestantism was introduced to the country by Americans arriving in 1915 during the United States occupation of Haiti. Along with these Protestant ideas, came the Southern Baptist ideology, which gained popularity in Haiti. During this time, Americans also brought the big band jazz that led to Haitian mini-jazz (mini-djaz).

== In the U.S. ==
In the early 1990s, Haitian American, Dickson Guillaume, formed the Haitian Interdenominational Mass Choir. This ensemble has songs in English and Creole and has been featured at Cornell University's Annual Festival of Black Gospel.

== See also ==
- Christianity in Haiti
