= Quimbe =

Quimbe is a topical song form from Sint Maarten formerly part of the Netherlands Antilles. It traditionally accompanies the ponum dance and drumming, but is now often performed without accompaniment. Lyrics include gossip, news and social criticism, and use clever puns and rhymes. Performance is often competitive in nature.
