= Matamuerte =

Traditional Garinagu Dance

Matamuerte is a traditional Garinagu dance. It is found in the Garifuna cultures in Central America, especially Honduras and Belize. The dance is performed with a background of rhythmic drums, common among Garinagu dances. Matamuerte is a humorous dance that conveys the image of people coming across a body on a beach and poking it to see if it is dead or alive.

Matamuerte can roughly be translated from Spanish as "death kills".

== See also ==
- Garifuna music
- Music of Honduras
