= Afoxé (musical tradition) =

- Origin: Salvador da Bahia, Brazil
- Genres: Afro-Brazilian, Candomblé
- Years active: 1920s–present

The term afoxé refers to a Carnival group originating from Salvador da Bahia, Brazil, in the 1920s, and the music it plays deriving from the Afro-Brazilian Candomblé religion. It came to indicate a musical rhythm, named ijexá derived from the ijexá nation within Candomblé. Cultural performances of the afoxés, typically at Brazilian Carnival, incorporate choreography, song, ritual language and ceremonies deriving from the Candomblé religion. In Brazil, afoxé is generally performed by blocos, afros-groups of mostly black or mulatto musicians who are familiar with African Brazilian music. Afoxés are a cultural and religious entity that preserves a tradition of Afro-Brazilian culture.

== Afoxé in Afro-Brazilian Carnival ==
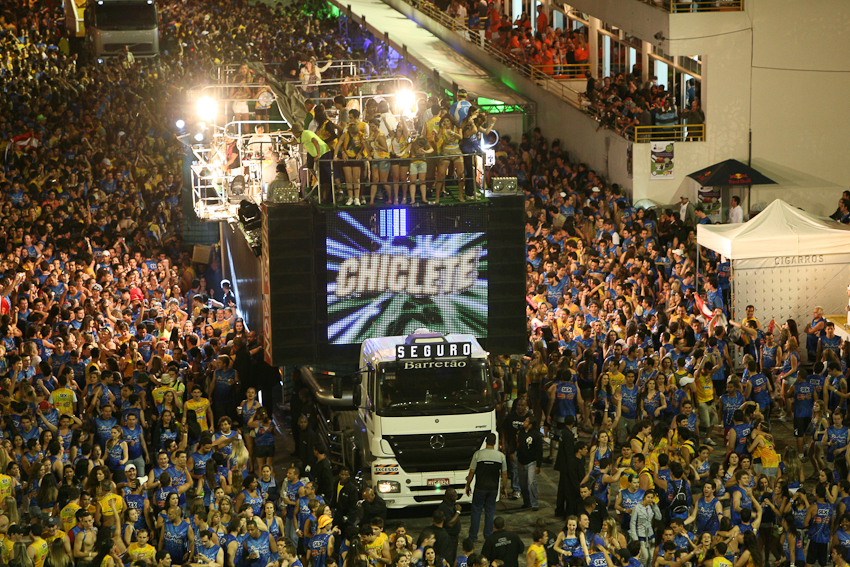
Carnival celebrations in Salvador de Bahia, Brazil

The annual Carnival that takes place in several cities of Brazil is considered the country's largest public festival. Specifically, Carnival in Bahia Salvador is the birthplace of several groups from the Afro-Brazilian tradition, afoxé, which relates to Afro-Brazilian Carnival traditions linked to the Candomblé religion. Carnival in Brazil has a strong and on-going presence of Afro-Brazilian culture The term "Afro" is utilised with reference to a phenomenon originating in Africa but developed in Brazil. Rather than celebrating the sacred Candomblé religion privately, the afoxé Carnival traditions are a public affirmation of the religion, which is openly displayed on the streets in a Carnival context. Carnival plays a fundamental role in defining black identities in the context of the larger society. In Brazil, Carnival is a moment when the racial heritage of Brazil as well as its hybrid cultural traditions is continually presented.

== History of the Afro-Brazilian Carnival Expression ==
Towards the end of the nineteenth century, following the abolition of slavery, processions celebrating African heritage took place in the annual Carnival celebrations in Brazil's major cities. The Brazilian cities of Recife and Salvador saw black Carnival groups powerfully and actively parading 'African' themes, which announced the development of African consciousness within the new Republic. Public events allowed blacks to determine an active and visible role in establishing cultural values that would define modern Brazilian society. In the early 1900s, dominant sectors of society, formed exclusively by white individuals of European descent: members of traditional families, wealthy merchants, high-level government employees and politicians, called for a state intervention in order to prohibit African related practices in Brazil. It was feared that these practices were 'Africanizing' the country's Carnival.

Between the years 1905 and 1914, Carnival expressions that included African music, dancing and costumes were banned and forced out of the city's official Carnival by Bahian police. The Afro-bahian practice of Candomblé was recognised as violent and individuals following the religion were subjected to legal prohibitions and police action. This caused these large, organised African groups to separate. Afoxés continued their traditions in the poor neighbourhoods of the city. On February 5, 1921, mentions of 'African' Carnival practices were reintroduced, appearing in the Bahian newspaper, Diário de Notícias.

== Candomblé Religion ==
Candomblé is an African-derived religion practiced in North-eastern Brazil, beginning in the early 19th century. It is considered the best known and most orthodox religion in Brazil. Candomblé is a hierarchical religion, which derives from a variety of practices that enslaved Africans brought to Brazil. Candomblé practice honours and summons the Orixás, the African gods, which are believed to guide and protect devotees. This is achieved through the power of song, dancing and drumming, as a central feature of worship. Music that accompanies the religious rituals of Candomblé feature a West African style of drumming. This drumming style includes a syncopated musical pattern and rhythm, referred to as ijexá. Ijexá is an integral symbol of black identity in Carnival. The Afro-religious communities who performed Candomblé music, were known as afoxés.

== Afoxé Music in Carnival ==
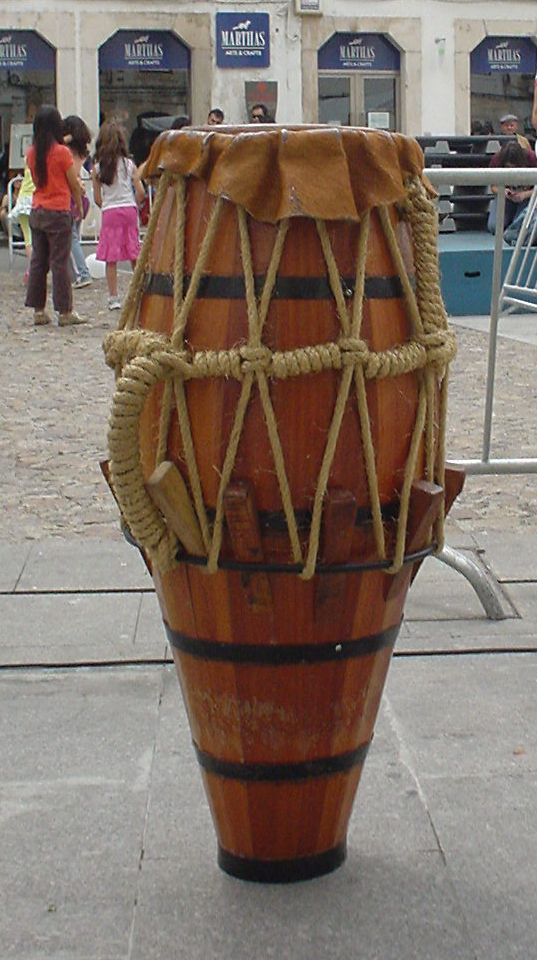
Atabaque drum- Single-headed drum made from wood and animal skins.

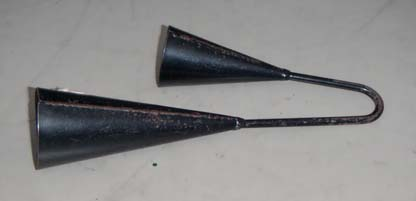
Agogô bell- A percussion instrument used by the Carnival afoxé

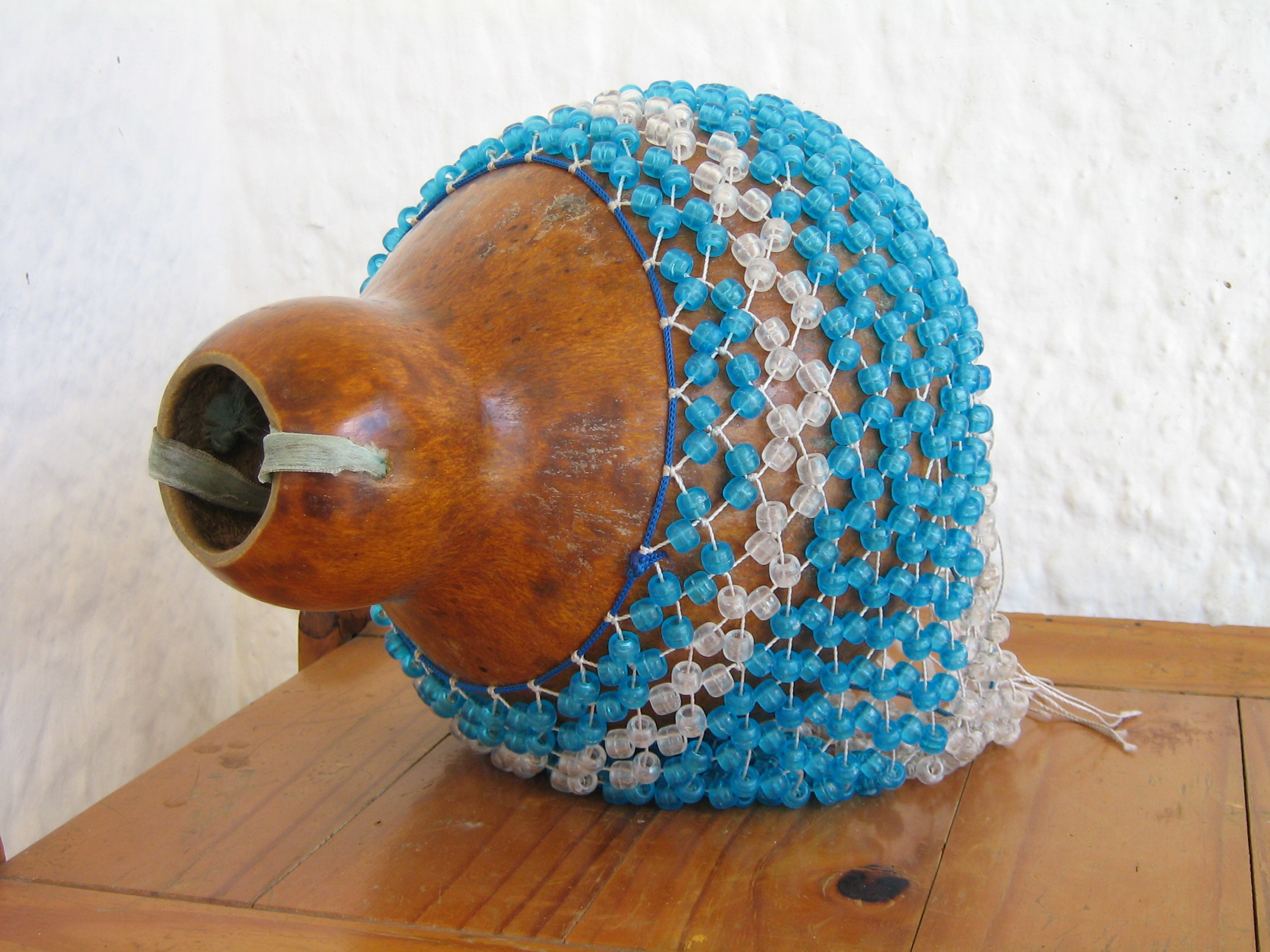
Afoxés- small beaded gourds used by the Carnival Afoxé

Whilst respecting and honouring the African and African-Bahian religious Carnival heritage, the careful selection of certain instruments greatly affects and impacts the percussive culture as well as an individual's relationship with the spiritual realm. The music of Candomblé uses the atabaque drums, the agogô bell and the afoxés (also refers to the small beaded gourds used by the afoxé groups), which all play central roles in afoxé Carnival traditions. An atabaque is the name given to a conga-like drum, which is closely associated with African heritage. These single-headed drums are made from wood and animal skins. Traditionally, in the Afro- Brazilian religious setting of Candomblé, these drums come in three sizes; Rum (large), Rumpi (medium), and Lê (small). In the afoxé, the lead drummer will use the largest size drum (Rum) and will improvise variations of set patterns, which are coordinated with dance movements. The agogô bell refers to a metal bell, in Yoruba, deriving from West African musical cultures. The bell's role is to provide a syncopated rhythm in afoxé performances. The afoxé gourd shaker is a percussion instrument deriving from West Africa. The instrument contains the gourd (cabaça), which is wrapped in a net with threaded beads and plastic balls. With these instruments, traditional songs deriving from the Candomblé religion are played and sung during afoxé Carnival.

These instruments are performed using the ijexá rhythm, a fundamental element of afoxé, which refers to the syncopated and basic rhythmic pattern played by the Carnival afoxé. The singing style of Candomblé includes scales with five pitches, call-and-response vocal organisation and syncopated phrasing. Typically, these songs with the Ijexá rhythm performed by the afoxé, are served to honour and praise the African gods known as Orixás of the Canbomblé religion. These songs were presented by the afoxé in both African (commonly Yoruban) and Portuguese languages.

== Filhos De Gandhi ==
Filhos De Gandhi is the most acknowledged afoxé group, as it is considered the largest, oldest and most respected Carnival group in Salvador, Brazil. The exclusively all-male group, Filhos De Gandhi meaning Sons of Gandhi, was founded in the year 1949, the year following the assassination of the well-respected Indian leader, Mahatma Gandhi. The creation of this afoxé group was inspired by Gandhi's death, who was an advocate for racial injustice in India. The anti-violence and civil rights activist was transformed into a sacred Carnival icon. As a result, a group of stevedores originating from the Port of Salvador were inspired to form this Carnival group, with the intent of being symbols of peace whilst combating discrimination against Afro-Brazilian peoples in the city of Salvador. Local priests of the Candomblé religion also participated in this afoxé group. Women were not allowed to participate. Due to the fact that the group was formed by stevedores, there was an absence of women working and unloading the ships. Women could only offer "logistical support, by taking care of the men's costumes and beautifying their turbans".

The Afoxé group has been granted the title Associação Cultural Recreativa e Carnavalesca Filhos de Gandhy, meaning that the group has a more significant role than annually parading in Afro-Brazilian Carnival, but they also have a religious, cultural, and social presence in the city throughout the year.

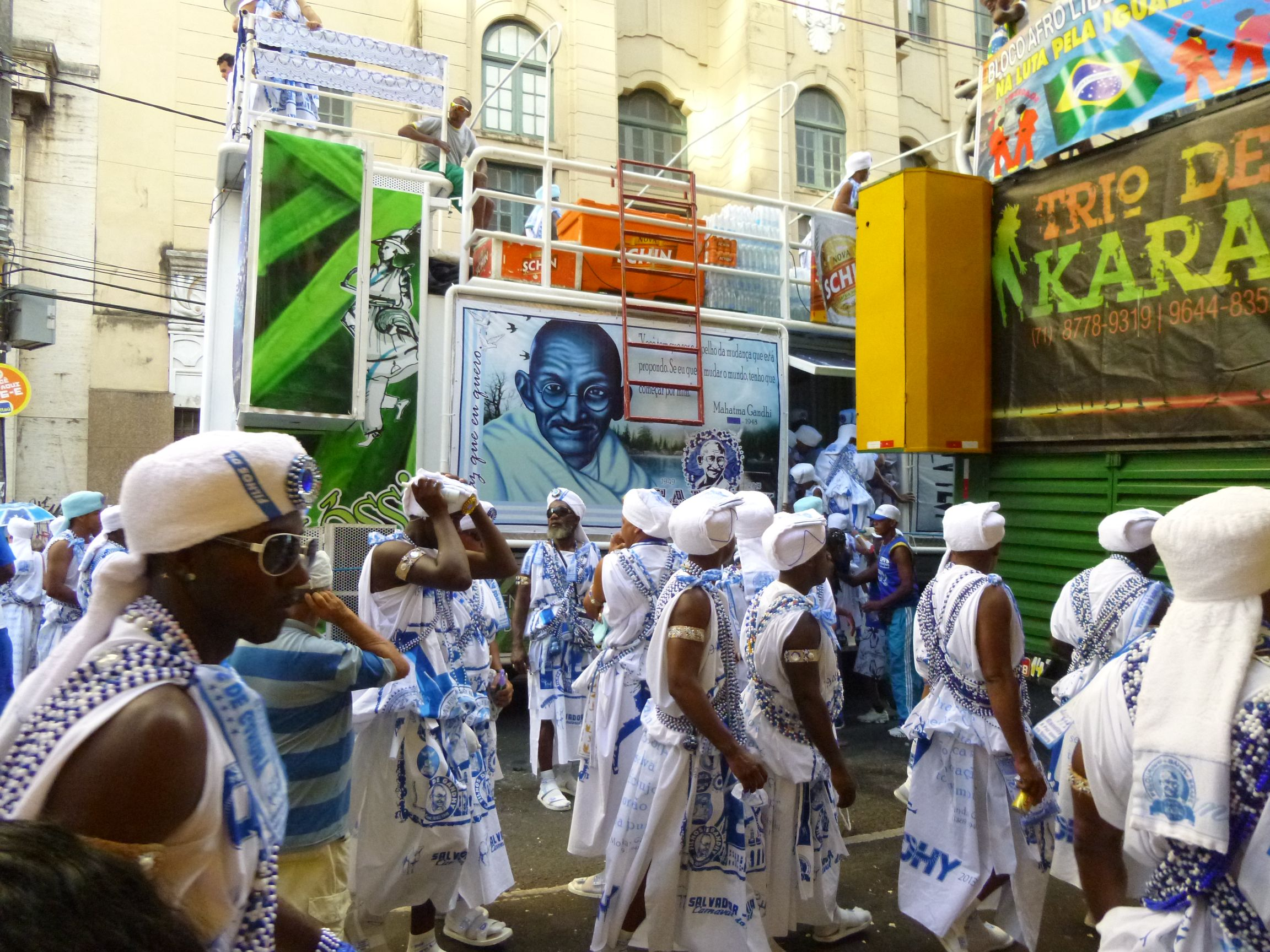
Members of the Filhos de Gandhi afoxé in traditional Carnival costumes

=== Traditional costumes ===
Filhos de Gandhi remains appealing to audiences as the group contains a mix of both African and Indian cultures. The African culture is apparent through dancing, music and rituals and the Indian culture is evident through the ornamental charm through its costumes. The costumes of the Filhos de Gandhi men, creates one of the most striking visual images of today's Bahian Carnival. During Carnival, Filhos de Gandhi spread awareness of the Orixás by displaying religious iconography on painted banners, floats and through songs, costumes and music.

Filhos de Gandhi members are notable and distinguished for their bejewelled, exotic and extravagant costumes. During Carnival, traditionally Filhos de Gandhi men are clothed in long and white T-shaped tunics, featuring the year's carnival theme, which is clearly imprinted on the front of the men's tunics in the colour blue. Each year, the design varies. The tunic displays an image of the Indian figure, Mahatma Gandhi. Filhos De Gandhi men also wear blue socks with white strappy, plastic sandals, which contain the word "Gandhy" printed on them. At the waist, the men use a blue sash to tie around their white tunics. Blue ribbons are used to tie two bows on the men's shoulders in order to pinch the fabric at the shoulder seams of the tunic.

Filhos De Gandhi members receive a long piece of white cotton towel. Prior to the commencement of Carnival, several Filhos De Gandhi members have this large piece of white cotton towel converted to a custom-made head turban. This removable headpiece is referred to as turbantes. Jewels and a brooch embellish the turban. The large 3-inch (in diameter) brooch is designed with blue and silver sequins, beads and gems. Brooch designs vary and allows for the men to design it to their own personal preference. A small drawstring bag typically made from cotton is held around the wrist of the men throughout the Carnival. It contains handkerchiefs and a lavender spray called Alfazema. Alfazema is included into the Filhos De Gandhi costume due to the widespread belief that lavender contains strong healing properties. Alfazema is held in a small bottle, which is sprayed by the Filhos De Gandhi men throughout the Carnival, in order to help purify, cleanse and calm the chaotic Carnival streets. Filhos De Gandhi perform this with the intent to lead the Brazilian city of Salvador to peace.

== The formation of an Afoxé ==
During Carnival, the formation of an afoxé is typically formed in a line. The line begins with the announcer, followed by the white guard, the King and Queen, the maracatu doll (a traditional black clothed doll representing tribal deities), the flag bearer, the guard of honour and following them is the band of percussionists including drummers, cowbells and shakers.

The ijexá rhythm, containing a call and response melody is sung by a soloist and repeated by a chorus. The ijexá rhythm is danced to, using simple yet traditional steps deriving from sacred Candomblé dances. This is characterised by a ginga swing, where the movement of the shoulders and arms are quick with steps that are short and small.
