= Balakadri =

Balakadri (called balkadri or kadri) is a traditional quadrille music that was performed for balls on the Caribbean island of Guadeloupe.

== History ==
Guadeloupean balakadri persisted into the 20th century and, despite disruption after World War II, made a comeback in the 1980s. The Guadeloupean-administered island of Marie-Galante has also had a vital and well-documented balakadri tradition. As in Martinique (and the Creole-speaking islands of St Lucia and Dominica), kwadril dances are in sets consisting of proper quadrilles, plus creolized versions of 19th-century couple dances: biguines, mazouks and valses Créoles.

To save the Balakadri, an association was created: F.R.E.G.A.Q.(Regional Federation of Guadeloupe Activities Quadrille). Its purpose is to promote, transmit, store Balakadri which is part of the cultural patrimoine Guadeloupe.

The first musicians to record on vinyl balakadri are:

- Ariste Ramier
- Commander Abel Marcille
- Salt Iphano
- Commander Grévius.

== Instrumentation ==
Instrumentation consists of variable combinations of accordion, guitar, violin, tanbou dibas, chacha (either a single metal cylinder as in Martinique, or a spherical calabash without a handle, held in both hands), malakach (maracas), triangle, bwa (tibwa) and syak, a bamboo rasp one metre long, grooved on both top and bottom, held with one end on the belly and the other on a door or wall and scraped with both hands. A konmandé completes the ensemble.

== internal link ==
- Music of Guadeloupe
- Kwadril
