= Abwe =

Cuban musical ensemble using gourds

An abwe or chekeré is a Cuban musical ensemble that uses gourds. It is a product of cabildos, historical congregations of African slaves brought to Cuba.

== See also ==
- Music of Cuba
- Slavery
- Caribbean music
- Music of African heritage in Cuba
