= Kwadril =

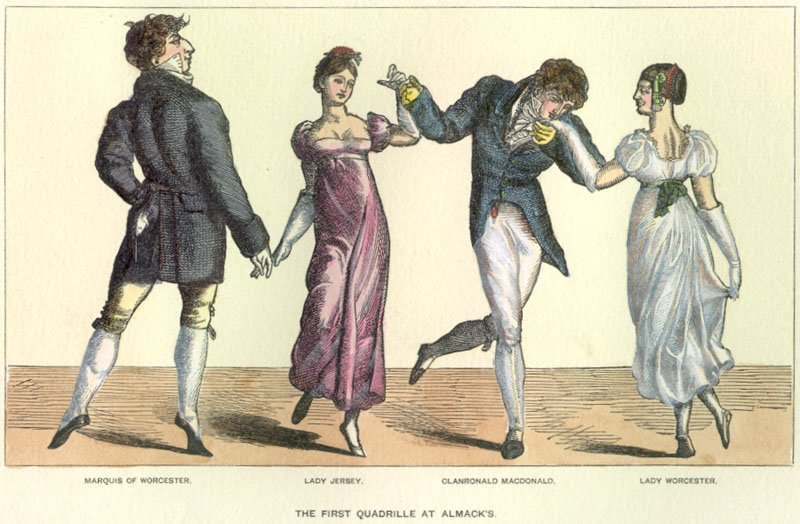
An image of people performing the quadrille dance.

In French Caribbean culture, especially of the Lesser Antilles, the term kwadril is a Creole term referring to a folk dance derived from the quadrille.

== Saint Lucia quadrille ==
On the island of Saint Lucia, kwadrils are social occasions held in private homes; Lucian kwadrils were formerly viewed as old-fashioned, but are increasingly being adopted as a symbol of Lucian culture. These kwadrils are very formalized, and are accompanied by a cuatro, rattle, chak-chak, violin, banjo and bones (zo).

It consists of five separate dances: the pwémyé fidji, dézyèm fidji, twazyèm fidji, katwiyèm fidji (also avantwa or lanmen dwèt) and gwan won (also grande rond). The musicians may also use a lakonmèt (mazurka), schottische or polka; the lakonmèt, also called the mazouk, is especially popular and is the only closed couple dance which originated in Saint Lucia.

== Dominica quadrille ==
The Dominican quadrille generally has four different figures, the pastouwèl, lapoul, lété and latrinitez. Some regions of Dominica, such as Petite Savanne, are home to local variants such as the caristo. Many quadrilles are found across Dominica under a wide variety of names. In addition to the standard quadrille, the lancer is also an important Dominican dance.

Accompaniment for the quadrille is provided by a four instrument ensemble called a jing ping band.

== Guadeloupe balakadri ==
Balakadri (called balkadri or kadri) is a traditional quadrille music that was performed for balls on the Caribbean island of Guadeloupe. Kwadril dances are in sets consisting of proper quadrilles, plus creolized versions of 19th-century couple dances: biguines, mazouks and valses Créoles.

Instrumentation consists of variable combinations of accordion, guitar, violin, tanbou dibas, chacha (either a single metal cylinder as in Martinique, or a spherical calabash without a handle, held in both hands), malakach (maracas), triangle, bwa (tibwa) and syak, a bamboo rasp one metre long, grooved on both top and bottom, held with one end on the belly and the other on a door or wall and scraped with both hands. A konmandé completes the ensemble.

== See also ==
- Music of Dominica
- Music of Guadeloupe
- Music of Martinique
- Music of Saint Lucia
