= Chanté mas =

Form of Carnival music of Dominica

- Other names: Lapo kabrit
- Stylistic origins: West African percussion instruments and other carnival elements
- Cultural origins: 19th century, Dominica
- Typical instruments: Lapo kabwit drums; tambou lélé; chak chak (a maracas); scraper-rattle; cowbell; tambourine; triangle; iron; conch shell; several horn players

Fusion genres
- Bouyon

Other topics
- Music of Dominica

Chanté mas (masquerade song) and Lapo kabrit is a form of Carnival music of Dominica. It is performed by masquerading partygoers in a two-day parade, with a lead vocalist (chantwèl), who is followed by the responsorial chorus (lavwa), with drummers and dancers dancing backwards in front of the drummer on a tambou lélé. The Carnival has African and French roots and is otherwise known as Mas Dominik, the most original Carnival in the Caribbean.

Carnival in Dominica is held in the capital city of Roseau, and takes elements of carnival that can be seen in the neighbouring French islands of Martinique and Guadeloupe, as well as Trinidad and Tobago Carnival. Notable events that take place during the season leading up to carnival include "j'ouvert" the opening of Carnival celebrations, the calypso Monarch music competition, the queen of Carnival Beauty Pageant and bouyon music bands. Celebrations last for the Monday and Tuesday before Ash Wednesday. Dominica's carnival is known to be the most original and least commercialized in the Caribbean giving the carnival its name the original mas

== History ==
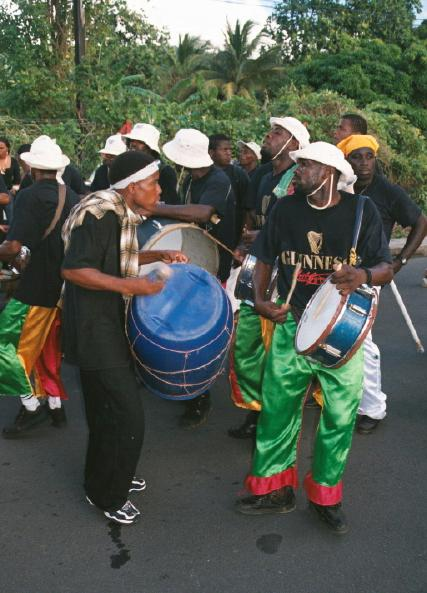
A Dominican drumming band

=== The French ===
The French were known to have celebrated this ‘freedom of the flesh’ prior to the Lenten season since the 4th Century. The Africans however, being enslaved in the Caribbean, were known to have carnival since emancipation in 1838. It is no wonder people have argued whether the festival is of historical or religious origin. Truth is though, this festival, as celebrated in Dominica, is a combination of both history and religion. The Europeans, most of whom were Roman Catholics, had celebrated carnival as the day before they would stay away from meat, as well as all fleshly desires.

=== The Africans ===
Both people lived in the West Indies during the slavery period, and so, Carnival celebration in Dominica arose as a result of the influence both ethnic groups.

On July 31, 1834 the Emancipation Act came into effect. With this, as of midnight, the now ex-slaves took to the streets in celebration. However, the slaves were soon brought back into a state of slavery without the chains, as they were made dependent on the white planters, and felt forced to work on the plantations. This system of Apprenticeship, a period in which the ex-slaves would gradually grow into a state of self-sufficiency, was supposed to last until 1840. However, visits by special magistrates to the Caribbean during that period proved that they were, hypothetically speaking, still slaves, because of how the planters treated them. The metropolitan countries then aborted the apprenticeship system two years earlier, bringing it to an end as of August 1, 1838.

At midnight, having thanked their gods for freedom, slaves took to the streets once more in emancipation celebrations. Shouts of joy rung across the islands of the Caribbean as slaves shook their bodies to the rhythms of their drums. Carnival celebrations was therefore made a religious festival whereby citizens could free the flesh, and revel for, come Ash Wednesday, the Lenten season would commence, and they would have to put away all fleshly desires for forty days and nights. And so it is, Carnival in Dominica came about, to run for about thirty days before Ash Wednesday.

== Characteristics ==
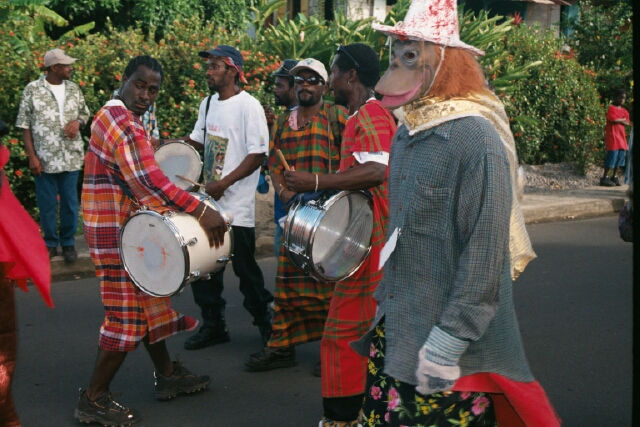
A Dominican Carnival costume band

The songs and music were the backbone of Dominica masquerade. It is celebrated by blowing conch shells or horns, beating lapo kabwit (goat skin) drums, iron, cowbell, and shaking the ckak chak (a maracas) while singing folk songs known as chanté mas. The mimicry and ridicule of the costumes were matched by the satire of the songs, which is full of double meaning and innuendo. This pattern is reflected in the Old Street ballads of Dominican masquerade.

As in such West African instances, it was the woman who led the song while the other dancers and onlookers gave the refrain or lavway. In Dominica, she was the chantuelle, and the "chante mas" songs she led were composed during the two or three weeks before Carnival.

=== Chanté mas ===
The chanté mas (masquerade song) tradition is based around pre-calypso Carnival music performed in a responsorial style by partygoers. Chanté mas lyrics are traditionally based on gossip and scandal, and addressed the personal shortcomings of others. Lyrics are almost all in French creole and are traditionally sung by women (chantwèl), while the instrumental tradition are predominantly practiced by men.

=== Lapo kabwit ===
Accompaniment for the Chanté mas is provided by the lapo kabwit, a drumming band of Dominica. The Dominican Carnival masquerade lasted for two days of parading through the streets, with a singer dancing backwards in front of the drummer on a tanbou lélé. Traditional instrumentation includes, the lapo kabwit drums, tambou lélé, chak chak (a maracas), scraper-rattle, cowbell, tambourine, triangle, conch shell, iron, and several horn players.

== Decline in tradition ==
The chanté mas tradition started to become dominated by imported calypso and steel pan music in the early 1960s. After a fire in 1963, the traditional carnival was banned, though calypso and steelpan continued to grow in popularity. Calypso appealed to Carnival-partygoers because the lyrical focus on local news and gossip was similar to that of chanté mas, despite a rhythmic pattern and instrumentation which contrast sharply with traditional Dominican Mas Domnik music.

Though the traditional Chanté mas and Lapo kabrit declined in popularity due to imported calypso and steel pan music, several villages on Dominica, such as Grand Bay, have preserved the unique Dominican tradition. On modern Dominica, Chanté mas and lapo kabrit has become a part of bouyon music.

== See also ==
- Music of Dominica
- Culture of Dominica
- List of festivals in Dominica
- Bouyon
