= Jing ping =

- Cultural origins: Dominica, West Indies
- Typical instruments: Traditional: Boumboum (boom pipe), syak or gwaj (scraper-rattle), tambal or tanbou (tambourine) and accordion. Contemporary: Drum set, modern Synthesizer, and Electric bass.

Fusion genres
- Cadence-lypso - Bouyon

Other topics
- Music of Dominica

Jing Ping is a kind of folk music originated on the slave plantations of Dominica, also known colloquially as an accordion band. Dominican folk music, jing ping bands accompany a circle dance called the flirtation, as well as the Dominican quadrille.

== Origin ==
The Dominican quadrille generally has four figures, the pastouwèl, lapoul, lété and latrinitez. Some regions of Dominica, such as Petite Savanne, are home to local variants such as the caristo. Many quadrilles are found across Dominica under a wide variety of names. In addition to the standard quadrille, the lancer is also an important Dominican dance.

Accompaniment for the quadrille is provided by a four instrument ensemble called a jing ping band. Jing ping bands are made up of a boumboum (boom pipe), syak or gwaj (scraper-rattle), tambal or tanbou (tambourine) and accordion. The double bass, violin, banjo and guitar are also sometimes used. Bamboo flutes led the jing ping ensembles before the 1940s, when accordions were introduced. The Dominican flute tradition declined as a result, despite their additional use in serenades, until being revived after the National Independence Competitions.

== Instruments ==
The accordion band is the most popular ensemble of folk instruments on the island of Dominica. In recent times, it has been referred to as the Jing Ping band - the name being an onomatopoeia resembling the finely textured sound that is produced by this ensemble:

- Primary Rhythmic Instrument (Tanbal) – It is the most important since the Tanbal player keeps the meter consistent for the other players to key directly from it. The Tanbal is a shallow drum with tightly stretched goatskin, held down by two or three wooden rings.
- Bass Instrument (The Boom-Boom) – A hollowed wooden bwa kan or piece of bamboo. There is no mouthpiece but the playing end has a slant cut to enhance the sound.
- Percussion (Gwaj or Siyak) – Has two parts; a cylinder measuring 3.5 inches in diameter and 10.5 inches length with holes like a grate in it. The cylinder also has gwen toloman (Canna Edules) or Jombi beads (Arbas precatorius). The other part is three 6-inch long wires of metal. It is played by shaking the cylinder and scrapping the metal stick against it.
- Melodic Instrument (Accordion, Banjo, flutes or Violin) – The accordion is mostly used. The accordionist keeps the tunes and may improvise from time to time. He/she key according to the rhythm of the Tanbal player.

== Jing ping in Contemporary music ==
=== Cadence-lypso ===
Cadence-lypso came from calypso from Trinidad and cadence rampa from Haiti, with influences from jing ping, the Dominican traditional music.

=== Bouyon ===
Bouyon legends Windward Caribbean Kulture (WCK) has played an important role in the development of Jing ping, giving credibility to a style that was seen as backward and unsophisticated. They began experimenting a fusion of Cadence-lypso and Jing ping.

== Contemporary Jing ping ==
Contemporary Jing ping is a modernized version of Jing ping, which utilizes modern instruments such as drum set, modern synthesizer, and electric bass. It reflect a continuing trend to explore the jing ping sound and reproducing it using modern musical instruments and technology.

== See also ==
- Music of Dominica
- Kwadril
