= Soca music =

Music genre

- Stylistic origins: Cadence; calypso; chutney; East-Indian music; kaiso; funk; soul
- Cultural origins: Early 1970s, Afro-Caribbean, Indo-Caribbean, Trinidad and Tobago

Fusion genres
- Chutney soca; parang soca; rapso; ragga soca; bouyon soca; reggaeton; kuduro; punta rock; zouglou; afrosoca

Other topics
- Music of Trinidad and Tobago; Tempo Networks

Soca music, or the "soul of calypso", is a genre of music that originated in Trinidad and Tobago in the 1970s. It is considered an offshoot of calypso, with influences from Afro-Trinidadian and Indo-Trinidadian rhythms. It was created by Ras Shorty I (or Lord Shorty) in an effort to revive traditional calypso, the popularity of which had been declining among younger generations in Trinidad due to the rise in popularity of reggae from Jamaica and soul and funk from the United States. From the 1980s onward, soca has developed into a range of new styles.

== Etymology ==
"Soca" is a portmanteau of the words "soul" and "calypso". The genre was defined by Lord Shorty as the "Soul of Calypso".

The word was originally spelled s-o-k-a-h by Lord Shorty. In a 1979 interview with Carnival Magazine, Lord Shorty stated that he "came up with the name soca. I invented soca. And I never spelt it s-o-c-a. It was s-o-k-a-h to reflect the East Indian influence." The use of kah (the Hindi word for "divine") referenced the genre's Indo-Caribbean influence. However, s-o-c-a quickly became the popular spelling after a journalist, Ivor Ferreira, misspelled the name. The article, which included an interview with Lord Shorty, was published during the 1976 Trinidad Carnival season. The article said "Shorty is doing soca". Lord Shorty confirmed the error, but chose to leave it that way to avoid confusion.

== History ==
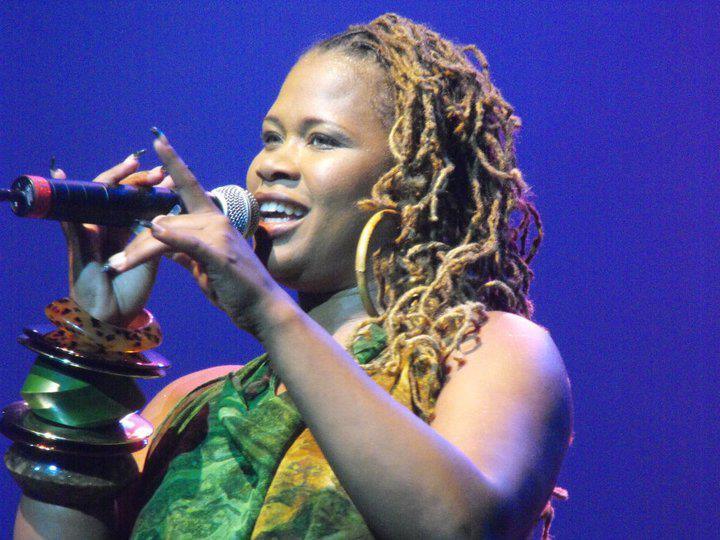
Claudette Peters, a soca music singer and songwriter.

Soca began its development in the early 1970s and grew in popularity throughout that decade. Soca's development as a musical genre included its fusion with calypso, kaiso, chutney, reggae, zouk, Latin, cadence, and traditional West African rhythms.

A sound project started in 1970 at KH Studios in Trinidad to find a way to record the complex calypso rhythm in a new multi-track recording era. Musicians involved in the initiative were Robin Imamshah (guitar, project lead), Angus Nunez (bass), Errol Wise (drums), Vonrick Maynard (drums), Clarence James (percussion), Carl Henderson (keyboards) and David Boothman (strings).

Some of the early songs recorded in 1972 at the KH Studios which benefited from this project were "Indrani" by Lord Shorty and "Calypso Zest" by Sensational Roots. Later came the soca hits "Endless Vibrations" and "Sweet Music" by Lord Shorty, recorded in 1974 and 1975 respectively, and "Second Fiddle" by Ella Andall, recorded in 1975. In 1976, "Savage" by Maestro and "Trinidad Boogie" by Last Supper (composed by Robin Imamshah) also benefited from the improving multi-track recording technology at KH Studios.

Soca continues to incorporate contemporary music styles and trends. Bollywood films, bhangra, the new Punjabi pop, and disco music in the United States have also experimented with soca.

=== Lord Shorty ===
The "father" of soca was a Trinidadian named Garfield Blackman, who rose to fame as Lord Shorty with his 1964 hit "Cloak and Dagger". He adopted the name "Ras Shorty I" in the early 1980s. He started out writing songs and performing in the calypso genre. A prolific musician, composer and innovator, Shorty experimented with fusing calypso and elements of Indo-Caribbean music after 1965, before debuting "the Soul of Calypso" (or "soca") music in the early 1970s.

Shorty was the first to define his music as "soca" during 1975 when his hit song "Endless Vibrations" caused musical waves on radio stations and at parties and clubs – not just in his native Trinidad and Tobago, but also in cities such as New York, Toronto and London. Soca was originally spelled "sokah", with the "kah" part being the first letter in the Sanskrit alphabet, and representing the power of movement as well as the East Indian rhythmic influence that helped to inspire the new beat. Shorty stated in a number of interviews that the idea for the new soca beat originated with the fusion of calypso with East Indian rhythms that he used in his 1972 hit "Indrani". Soca solidified its position as the popular new beat adopted by most Trinidadian calypso musicians by the time Shorty recorded his crossover hit "Endless Vibrations" in 1974.

In 1975, Shorty recorded an album entitled Love in the Caribbean that contained a number of crossover soca tracks. During the subsequent promotional tour, Shorty stopped at the isle of Dominica and saw the top band there, Exile One, perform at the Fort Young Hotel. Shorty was inspired to compose and record a soca and cadence-lypso fusion track titled "E Pete" or "Ou Petit", which was the first in that particular soca style. Shorty consulted on the Creole lyrics he used in the chorus of his "E Pete" song with Dominica's 1969 Calypso King, Lord Tokyo, and two Creole lyricists, Chris Seraphine and Pat Aaron.

== French Creole impact on soca ==
The main source of soca is calypso developed in Trinidad in the 18th and 19th centuries from the West African kaiso and canboulay music brought by enslaved Africans and Immigrants from the French Antilles to Trinidad to work on sugar plantations after the Cedula of Population of 1783. The Africans brought to toil on sugar plantations, were stripped of many connections to their homeland and family. They used calypso to mock the slave masters and to communicate with each other. Many early calypsos were sung in French Creole by an individual called a griot. As calypso developed, the role of the griot became known as a chantuelle and eventually, calypsonian.

Modern calypso, however, began in the 19th century, a fusion of disparate elements ranging from the masquerade song lavway, French Creole belair and the calinda stick-fighting chantwell. Calypso's early rise was closely connected with the adoption of Carnival by Trinidadian slaves, including canboulay drumming and the music masquerade processions. The French brought Carnival to Trinidad, and calypso competitions at Carnival grew in popularity, especially after the abolition of slavery in 1834.

Cadence-lypso is a fusion of cadence rampa from Haiti and calypso from Trinidad & Tobago that has also spread to other English speaking countries of the Caribbean. Originated in the 1970s by the Dominican band Exile One on the island of Guadeloupe, it spread and became popular in the dance clubs around the Creole world and Africa as well as the French Antilles.

In the French Antilles, cadence-lypso evolved into zouk as popularized by the band Kassav in the 1980s. Kassav' was formed in 1979 by Pierre-Edouard Décimus and Fréddy Marshall (former musicians from the Les Vikings de Guadeloupe), in addition to Paris studio musician Jacob Desvarieux. Together and under the influence of well-known Dominican, Haitian and Guadeloupean kadans or compas bands such as Experience 7, Grammacks, Exile One, Les Aiglons, Tabou Combo, Les Freres Dejean, and others, they decided to make Guadeloupean carnival music recording it in a more fully orchestrated yet modern and polished style. This style of music had an impact on a certain style of soca known as "zouk soca", mostly produced in St. Lucia.

The 1990s in Dominica was dominated by a new musical form called bouyon music. The best-known band in the genre is Windward Caribbean Kulture (WCK), who originated the style in 1988 by experimenting with a fusion of cadence-lypso and jing ping. They began using native drum rhythms such as lapo kabwit and elements of the music of jing ping bands, as well as ragga-style vocals.

Bouyon influenced a certain style of soca known as bouyon soca. Bouyon soca typically blends old bouyon music rhythms from the '90s and soca music creating a unique style soca sound. The style of music was made more popular to the Caribbean region by the likes of the producer Dada and artists ASA from Dominica with collaborations from Trinidadian and St. Vincentian artists such as Skinny Fabulous, Bunji Garlin, Iwer George and Machel Montano. Hit songs featuring bouyon flavored rhythms and sounds and familiar soca attributes include "Famalay" and "Conch Shell".

== Related genres ==
Soca music has evolved like most other music genres over the years, with calypsonians, soca artists, musicians and producers also experimenting with fusing soca with other Caribbean rhythms. Examples include:

=== Afrosoca ===
Afrosoca is a fusion genre of afrobeats and soca music and some influences from dancehall. Afrosoca songs typically have a similar tempo to Groovy Soca (110 to 135 BPM), often with West African-influenced melodies. The genre was pioneered in Trinidad & Tobago by Nigerian and Trinidadian artists.

=== Chutney soca ===
Chutney soca is one of the original soca styles started by Lord Shorty that contains strong East Indian musical influences; It is a soca style that originates in Trinidad and Tobago; many of the songs have both English and "Hindi" lyrics. The term Chutney soca was coined by the Indo-Trini artist, Drupatee Ramgoonai in 1987 when she recorded a hit song called "Chatnee Soca". Soon after 1987 the spelling was changed to Chutney Soca. Before 1987 this fusion style was sometimes referred to as Indo Soca or Indian Soca. The term Chutney that is now being used to refer to Indo-Caribbean music did not come into popular use until after 1987 when many Indo-Trinis started to abbreviate the term "Chutney soca" to "Chutney" in reference to those Chutney soca songs that were sung only in the Hindi language.

=== Ragga soca ===
Ragga soca is a fusion of soca and the former artistic lyrical delivery of Jamaican artists known as "DJing or chanting". It is a fusion of dancehall and contemporary calypso/soca, which has an uptempo beat with moderate bass and electronic instruments. Bunji Garlin is one of the artists that has sung ragga soca in Trinidad and Tobago since the late 1990s and has been dubbed the King of Ragga Soca. "Dancehall soca" and "bashment soca" are other terms used to refer to "ragga soca" music and these other terms are sometimes used depending on the artists and Caribbean country they hail from, with "bashment soca" being used for the Barbadian contribution to the genre while the Jamaican artists usually refer to their contributions as "dancehall soca".

=== Parang soca ===
Parang soca or soca parang is a fusion of calypso, soca, parang and Latin music. It originated in Trinidad & Tobago and is often sung in a mixture of English and Spanish. The first major parang soca hit was a track called "Parang Soca" by the Calypsonian called Crazy for the 1978 Christmas season that also gave this soca sub-genre its name. Crazy is viewed as the pioneer of the parang soca sub-genre and is also dubbed the Original Parang Soca King.

=== Steelband soca ===
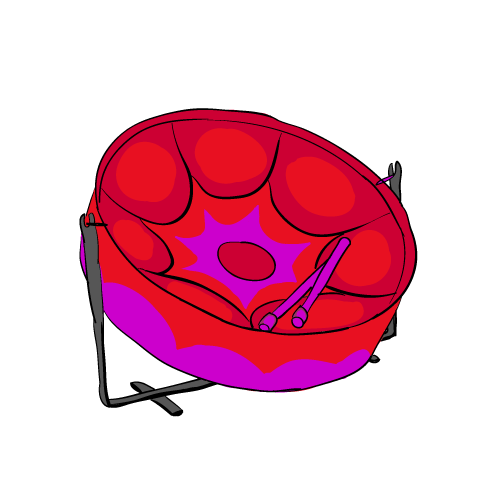
Illustration of a steel pan

Steelband soca or Pan soca also referred to in Trinidad & Tobago as Pan Kaiso is soca composed for or using steel pans which are types of music drums often used in soca and calypso music; it became so popular that it became its own musical genre. This soca style was mostly pioneered by the late Lord Kitchener whose songs have been played by steel bands at T&T's annual Panorama competitions more than the songs of any other composer. The steel pan originated in the Republic of Trinidad and Tobago during the late 1930s. Steel pans are handmade, bowl-like metal drums crafted from oil drums so that different drum sections produce different notes when struck. Steelbands are groups of musicians who play songs entirely on steel drums. There are many types of steel pans, each with its own set of pitches.

=== Groovy soca ===
Though most of the early soca recordings of the 1970s were done at a groovy pace, Groovy soca was made popular as a trend and soca style starting with Robin Imamshah's composition "Frenchman" in 1990.

The term groovy soca was coined in early 2005 by the ISM organizers as a re-branding of the slower tempo soca styles that had been popular in Trinidad and Tobago since the inception of soca music in early 1970s.

=== Bouyon soca ===
Bouyon soca, sometimes referred to as "jump up soca", is a fusion genre that typically blends old bouyon rhythms from the '90s and soca music. Bouyon soca is a term coined by non-Dominican producers and musicians, mainly from St Lucia, who embrace both Soca from Trinidad and Bouyon music from Dominica and so find it natural to produce blends of both music genres. Bouyon is a music genre that originated in Dominica that is distinguishable from its older "colleague" Soca.

In Dominica, while there may have been the occasional fusions, bouyon has always maintained a clear, recognizable and different style from soca. Outside Dominica, the Bouyon Soca fusion style is popular in islands including Antigua, Saint Lucia, Guadeloupe and Martinique and is a natural evolution from Zouk and Soca fusions that were popular there during the 1980s.

=== Dennery segment ===
Dennery segment is a style of Soca music developed in Saint Lucia in the early 2010s. It emerged from Kuduro, incorporating Zouk influence and Lucian drums alongside suggestive lyrics usually sung in Kwéyòl (Saint Lucian Creole). Originally known as Lucian kuduro, it was changed to Dennery segment to reference the town Dennery where the genre began.

Originally just singing over existing kuduro beats, artists began to build their own rhythms from scratch and that's what created the foundation of the genre. Dennery segment beats have a simple build, aggressive drums, and are always above 140 BPM. The style is also different from other soca because it is less melodic and more repetitive, usually only having one lead instrument that carries the entire beat.

In the late 2010s, Dennery segment artists such as Freezy, Mighty, and Motto incorporated more English into their lyrics and that led to a boom in popularity throughout the Caribbean and raised the genre's international profile. Artists in this first wave from Saint Lucia began collaborating with artists from off the island, and they played at festivals throughout the Caribbean.

=== Power soca ===
The term "power soca" was coined in early 2005 by the ISM organizers as a re-branding of the uptempo jump & wave soca style that took hold in Trinidad and Tobago during the early 1990s. This fast-paced version of Soca music tends to appeal more to the younger generation of party-goers and those who love working out in the gyms getting fit for the Carnival season and playing mas. Calypsonian and soca artist Superblue pioneered this style with his 1991 hit "Get Something & Wave". Power soca of today is known for its high bpm (ranging from 155 to 163) and its aggressive drums/percussion and dark synths. Today, it has transcended from its original sound of darkness into a more light and playful sound but has kept its foundation of fast-paced rhythms.

== Instrumentation ==
Soca music is based on a strong rhythmic section that is often recorded using synthesized drum sounds and then sequenced using computers; however, for live shows, the live human drummer emulates the recorded version, often using electronic drums to trigger drum samples. The drum and percussion are often loud in this genre of music and are sometimes the only instruments to back up the vocal. Soca is indeed defined by its loud, fast percussive beats. Synthesizers are used often in modern soca and have replaced the once typical horn section at 'smaller' shows. Electric and bass guitars are typical components of a live soca bands. A horn section is found occasionally in live soca bands mostly for the 'bigger' shows. It usually consists of two trumpets and a trombone, with saxophones being part of the section from time to time. Other metal instruments may include cowbell or automobile brake drums.

== Brooklyn soca ==
From the mid-1970s through the early 1990s, Brooklyn, New York, in the United States, became a center for soca music production. The borough, home to a large and diverse West Indian population, boasted three important Caribbean immigrant-owned record companies: Straker's Records (owned by Granville Straker), Charlie's Records (owned by Rawlston Charles), and B's Records (owned by Michael Gould). Nearly every important calypsonian/soca singer of the era recorded on one or more of these Brooklyn labels, resulting in a significant expansion of the music's international reach. Taking advantage of New York's advanced recording and mixing facilities, several top calypsonians turned soca singers, including the Mighty Sparrow, Calypso Rose, and the Mighty Duke, relocated to the city. Others, including Chalkdust, Lord Kitchener, Explainer, Swallow, and Shadow, cycled between the Caribbean and Brooklyn to record and perform.

== In media ==
Soca music videos are played on several television channels, including CaribVision, Centric, Synergy TV, and Tempo TV. The theme tune to the UK comedy show Desmond's was in a soca style.

In 2014, Apple's iTunes Store became the largest online store to recognize calypso and soca as two of its formal catalog genres.

== See also ==
- Cadence-lypso
- Caribbean music bands
- Caribbean Carnival
- Carnival Road March
- Riddim
