= Tropical Family =

Compilation album by Various artists
- Released: 1 July 2013
- Genre: Tropical music
- Label: Play On

Singles from Tropical Family
- 1. "Maldòn" Released: July 2013

Tropical Family is a banner for a musical collective of artists who came together in 2013 to collaborate on an album of tropical music and summer-y dance songs. The 12-track album was released on 1 July 2013, with 12 cover versions of well-known songs by diverse artists. A deluxe edition was released in November with four additional tracks included.

Initially, Serge Gainsbourg's "Couleur café" as performed by Louisy Joseph had been recorded, but eventually it was set aside in favor of Teri Moïse's song "Les Poèmes de Michelle" as interpreted by Slaï on the album.

== Track listing ==
Track #	Song title	Length	Performer(s)	Original by
1.	"Maldòn"	2:58	Lynnsha, Fanny J, Louisy Joseph	Zouk Machine
2.	"Flamme"	4:23	Axel Tony, Layanah	Slaï
3.	"Obsesión"	3:13	Kenza Farah, Lucenzo	Aventura
4.	"Sensualité"	3:18	Axel Tony, Sheryfa Luna	Axelle Red
5.	"Angela"	2:57	Jessy Matador, Zifou	Saïan Supa Crew
6.	"Kolé séré"	3:52	Matt Houston, Kim	Philippe Lavil & Jocelyne Beroard
7.	"Le soleil donne"	3:10	Corneille	Laurent Voulzy
8.	"Mélissa"	3:15	Medhy Custos, Sheryfa Luna	Julien Clerc
9.	"Les Poèmes de Michelle"	3:47	Slaï	Teri Moïse
10.	"Il jouait du piano debout"	3:03	Slaï, Mélissa Nkonda	France Gall
11.	"Belle-Ile en Mer"	3:15	Tom Frager	Laurent Voulzy
12.	"Les Sunlights des Tropiques"	3:44	Collégiale (the collective)	Gilbert Montagné

== Deluxe edition ==
On 18 November 2013, a deluxe edition was released, that included the same track list in addition to four bonus tracks not found on the original release, being "Turn Me On" by Matt Houston and Kevin Lyttle, "Enamórame" by DJ Assad featuring Papi Sanchez & Luyannah, "Couleur Café" by Louisy Joseph and "Petites Iles" by Lynnsha & Kymaï1.

=== Track list ===
Track #	Song title	Length	Performer(s)	Original by
1-12	Same as above			
13.	"Turn Me On"	3:11	Kevin Lyttle & Matt Houston	Kevin Lyttle
14.	"Enamórame (Oui bébé)"	3:23	Papi Sánchez, Luyanna & DJ Assad	Papi Sánchez
15.	"Couleur café"	3:22	Louisy Joseph	Serge Gainsbourg
16.	"Petites îles"	3:41	Lynnsha & Kymaï	Neg Marrons and Cesária Évora

== Charts ==
=== Album ===
Year (2013)	Peak position
Ultratop Belgian (Wallonia) Albums Chart	56
SNEP French Albums Chart	5

=== Singles ===
Year	Goldman song	Credited performer(s)	Peak positions		Ref	Music video
Year	Goldman song	Credited performer(s)	FRA	BEL (Wa)	Ref	Music video
2013	"Maldòn"	Lynnsha, Fanny J and Louisy Joseph	15	15 (Ultratip)		Video on YouTube
2013	"Obsesión"	Kenza Farah & Lucenzo	16	7 (Ultratip)		Video on YouTube
2013	"Flamme"	Axel Tony & Layanah	118	–		
2014	"Enamórame (Oui bébé)"	DJ Assad feat. Papi Sanchez & Luyanna	–	24 (Ultratip)		
