= Zouk love (music style) =

Slow and romantic subgenre of zouk music

Zouk Love
- Stylistic origins: Zouk; R&B; Pop; Soul
- Cultural origins: Mid-1980s, French Caribbean (especially Guadeloupe and Martinique)
- Typical instruments: Vocals; synthesizer; guitar; drums; bass guitar; keyboard; percussion

Other topics
- Salsa; bachata

Zouk love is a slow-tempo, romantic subgenre of zouk music that emerged in the mid-1980s in the French Caribbean, particularly in Guadeloupe and Martinique. It is a tropical music genre, known for its smooth rhythms and themes of love.

== Characteristics ==
Zouk love is typically slower and more melodic than its parent genre. It features soft, romantic vocals—mostly sung in French—combined with smooth synthesizers, electronic drums, and light percussion.

The genre shares similarities with modern compas from Haiti, especially in rhythm and dance style, but emphasizes emotional balladry with a focus on romantic themes.

== History ==
Zouk love originated in the mid-1980s as a slower and more romantic evolution of the fast-paced zouk béton popularized by Kassav'. By the 1990s, the genre became even more languid, dropping in tempo to around 95–100 beats per minute. Brass instruments were phased out in favor of synthesizers and drum machines, and the music adopted a more commercial sound.

The lyrics often shifted toward sentimental and romantic themes, avoiding controversial or political content. French replaced most Antillean Creole in the lyrics, and zouk love took on the qualities of international pop, distancing itself from its roots in local tradition. The dance associated with this music became more intimate and minimalist, performed in close embrace with subtle hip movements.

Artists like Francky Vincent popularized a playful, sensual version of zouk love with hits like "Fruit de la passion" and "Alice ça glisse." Others, such as Gilles Floro and Jocelyne Béroard, focused on deeply emotional and sentimental ballads.

In the 2000s and beyond, the genre continued to evolve, with some musicians incorporating elements of contemporary R&B and pop production. Notable artists include Slaï (Patrice Sylvestre), Princess Lover, and Njie.

Since 2010, a new generation of zouk love performers has gained popularity and remains influential today, including Lynnsha, Layannah, Nesly, Kim, Mikl, Marvin, and Fanny J.

== Influence and legacy ==
Zouk love influenced many romantic music styles across the Lusophone world. Its smooth rhythms and emotional tone inspired genres like kizomba, tarraxinha, and Cabo love.
