= List of number-one singles of 1990 (France) =

This is a list of the French SNEP Top 50 Singles number-one singles of 1990.

== Summary ==
=== Singles chart ===
Week	Issue Date	Artist	Single
1	January 6	Roch Voisine	"Hélène"
2	January 13	Roch Voisine	"Hélène"
3	January 20	Roch Voisine	"Hélène"
4	January 27	François Feldman	"Les Valses de Vienne"
5	February 3	François Feldman	"Les Valses de Vienne"
6	February 10	François Feldman	"Les Valses de Vienne"
7	February 17	François Feldman	"Les Valses de Vienne"
8	February 24	Roch Voisine	"Hélène"
9	March 3	Roch Voisine	"Hélène"
10	March 10	François Feldman	"Les Valses de Vienne"
11	March 17	François Feldman	"Les Valses de Vienne"
12	March 24	Les Vagabonds	"Le temps des Yéyés"
13	March 31	Les Vagabonds	"Le temps des Yéyés"
14	April 7	Les Vagabonds	"Le temps des Yéyés"
15	April 14	Les Vagabonds	"Le temps des Yéyés"
16	April 21	Les Vagabonds	"Le temps des Yéyés"
17	April 28	Les Vagabonds	"Le temps des Yéyés"
18	May 5	Les Vagabonds	"Le temps des Yéyés"
19	May 12	The Christians	"Words"
20	May 19	The Christians	"Words"
21	May 26	Elton John	"Sacrifice"
22	June 2	Elton John	"Sacrifice"
23	June 9	Elton John	"Sacrifice"
24	June 16	Lagaf'	"Bo le lavabo (WC Kiss)"
25	June 23	Zouk Machine	"Maldòn"
26	June 30	Zouk Machine	"Maldòn"
27	July 7	Zouk Machine	"Maldòn"
28	July 14	Zouk Machine	"Maldòn"
29	July 21	Zouk Machine	"Maldòn"
30	July 28	Zouk Machine	"Maldòn"
31	August 4	Zouk Machine	"Maldòn"
32	August 11	Charles D. Lewis	"Soca Dance"
33	August 18	Charles D. Lewis	"Soca Dance"
34	August 25	Charles D. Lewis	"Soca Dance"
35	September 1	Charles D. Lewis	"Soca Dance"
36	September 8	Charles D. Lewis	"Soca Dance"
37	September 15	Charles D. Lewis	"Soca Dance"
38	September 22	Zouk Machine	"Maldòn"
39	September 29	Zouk Machine	"Maldòn"
40	October 6	Félix Gray and Didier Barbelivien	"À toutes les filles..."
41	October 13	Félix Gray and Didier Barbelivien	"À toutes les filles..."
42	October 20	UB40	"Kingston Town"
43	October 27	UB40	"Kingston Town"
44	November 3	UB40	"Kingston Town"
45	November 10	Mecano	"Une femme avec une femme"
46	November 17	Mecano	"Une femme avec une femme"
47	November 24	Mecano	"Une femme avec une femme"
48	December 1	Mecano	"Une femme avec une femme"
49	December 8	Mecano	"Une femme avec une femme"
50	December 15	Mecano	"Une femme avec une femme"
51	December 22	Mecano	"Une femme avec une femme"
52	December 29	François Feldman	"Petit Frank"

== See also ==
- 1990 in music
- List of number-one singles in France
- List of artists who reached number one on the French Singles Chart
