= D. Daly =

D.Daly
- Birth name: Didier Daly
- Also known as: Mista Dal, Dalycious, Le Dal
- Born: 1978 (age 46–47); Les Abymes, Guadeloupe
- Genres: Hip hop; reggae; dancehall; soca; bouyon
- Occupation(s): Singer-songwriter, composer, actor, producer
- Years active: 1998–present
- Labels: Hitmaker Army

D. Daly (born Didier Daly, 17 June 1978, Abymes, Guadeloupe) is a French singer-songwriter, composer, actor and music producer.

== Career ==
In 1996 while in Raizet, Guadeloupe, Didier Daly took his first steps in music. With his friends Darkman, Tysmé, Edinyo and Sherkan, he created la Horde Noire (the Black Horde).

In 1998, the band made its first song called "Mi la sa ka bay". Making the video of this song led to a decisive encounter with Jean-Claude Flamand Barny, a director. He joined the " Karukéra Crew " (Star Jee, Exxòs, BBG, Tysmé, Phonie, ...) and la Horde Noire. After several shows in Guadeloupe, he went to France in 1999. At that moment the band broke up, so he decided to make his first solo album. A few years later, he returned to Guadeloupe with a musical model and, thanks to Staniski, he met David Drumeaux, who produced the two albums I alé man and Mista dal.

=== I alé man ===
Daly's first solo album, I alé man, was created in June 2004. This album was awarded the Golden Trophy in 2004 and the Holidays Dancehall Award thanks to the song Tchenbé Nou, the Sacem Award in 2005 for Newcomer of the Year, the Phenix Tube Trophy in 2006 with Toujou Opé and the Glory Trophy in 2006 with Twòp. This enabled him to take part of the opening shows of Corneille, Sean Paul in Guadeloupe and in Martinique but also to appear on the stages of the Centre des Arts, of Bercy for the Grand Méchant Zouk, of Zénith de Paris for the concert of Karukera Sound System and at the Bataclan for Patrick Saint-Eloi's tour called Love tour.

=== Nèg Maron, the movie ===
Five years after their meeting, Barny gave him the role of Silex, one of the two main characters of his first movie. It is the story of Guadeloupe's youth and was produced by Mathieu Kassovitz.

=== Mista Dal ===
Released on 7 July 2007 after six months in the recording studio, Mista Dal was his second album. Daly wrote the songs for the work.

His first solo concert took place in centre des Arts on 16 January 2008, with Shaolin and Dj Jaïro in the opening show. Daly was joined by Patrick Saint-Eloi, Admiral T, Missié GG, Jeff Joseph, V-ro and Benzen. Just arrived from Paris were Stéphane Castry, bassist, Michael Désir, drummer, Yann Négrit, guitarist and Didier Davidas, keyboard player.

== Discography ==
=== Albums ===
- La horde noire (1998)
- I alé man, premier album solo (2004)
- Mista Dal (I alé man part 2) (2007)
- Le Dalycious (2012)

=== Compilations ===
- Summer Jam (2010)
- 30 ans de kassav (2009)
- Reaktor (2006)
- Le Grand Méchant Zouk (2006)
- Dj Jackson " pran pyé la " (2006)
- Ragga connection vol 1 (2006)
- Caribbean session du Karukera Sound System (2005)
- Killa session vol 2 (2005)
- Hartunes (2005)
- Ragga color (2002)

=== DVD (concerts, clips) ===
- Admiral T au Zénith de Paris, DVD (2011)
- Summer Jam (2010)
- Kréyolistik (2010)
- 30 ans de kassav (2009)
- Le Grand Méchant Zouk (2006)

=== Mixtapes ===
- Thug Mix (2004)
- Teworist (2004)
- Hip hop Kreol (2000)

=== Singles ===
- Karukera Crew (2000)
- Big Ting Poppin (2009)
- respekte-w (2011)
- respekte-w remix (2011)
- bay dlo (2012)
- difé (2012)
- Dèlbow (feat.Politik Nai & Daddy Yod) (2013)
- A l'ancienne (feat.Riddla) (2014)

== Filmography ==
=== Films ===
- Nèg Maron (2005)

=== Clips ===
- Mi la sa ka bay (1998)
- Tchenbé nou (2004)
- Lyrical Teworist 2005 (2005)
- Twòp (2005)
- Nou toujou opé (2005)
- Fos (2007)
- Big Ting Poppin (2009)
- Trêve de bavardages (Orlane feat Daly) (2009)
- Nou D2 (Suntrack Session) (2009)
- Respekté’w (2011)
- Vacans la rivé (2012)
- rev en mwen (reprise Patrick Saint-Eloi) (2013)
- Delbor (feat.Daddy Yod & Politik Nai) (2014)
- A l'ancienne (2014)
