= Fanny J =

French singer

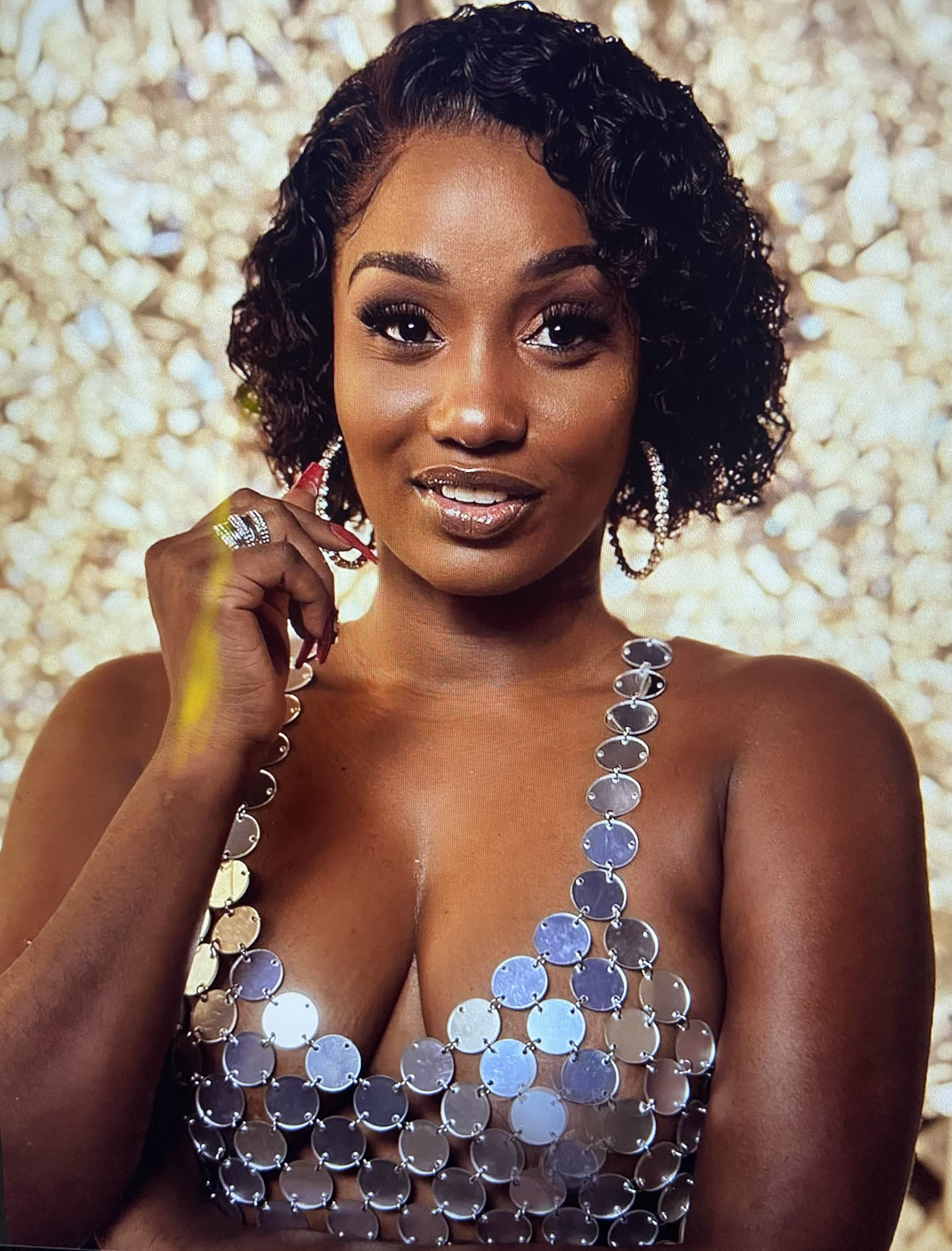

Background information
- Born: Fanny Jacques-André-Coquin; 6 October 1987 (age 38); Cayenne, French Guiana
- Genres: Zouk; R&B
- Years active: 2007–present
- Labels: Section Zouk, Warner, UM Music

Fanny Jacques-André-Coquin better known as Fanny J (born in Cayenne in French Guiana on 6 October 1987) is a French singer of zouk and contemporary R&B.

== Career ==
She started very early in music taking part in various local music competitions in Guiana like Révélation Podium and Podium Inter-Lycées de Guyane and very early on adopted the zouk genre of music. During one of the competitions, she met Warren, a well-known songwriter and producer who offered the song "On t'a zappé" for her. In 2006, she moved to Limoges, France for her studies, but continued her musical aspirations preparing for an album.

In 2007, Warren wrote "Ancrée à ton port" for her. She released her debut album Vous les Hommes in 2007 on Section Zouk record label with 16 tracks in a number of languages. Warner Music picked on that and signed her reissuing the album with two additional tracks. She adopted the name Fanny J for the Warner Music reissue. The label also coupled her with French-Malian rapper Mokobé for a revamped remixed single for "Ancrée à ton port" that became one of the definitive zouk hits of 2007. "Ancrée à ton port" reached number 12 on SNEP, the official French Singles Chart. Other popular tracks included "Je l'aime" and "Sé taw". In 2009, she returned for a big concert in her birthplace French Guiana. The album was also promoted all over Europe, some African countries and the United States.

She came back in 2010, with her second album Secrets de Femme also arranged by Warren and produced by Harold Singamalon. She cooperated with Nickenson Prud'Homme in "Lè ou jwenn lanmou" and with Swedish producer Million Stylez in "Me and You" and "Okay" with rapper Black Kent. The latter accompanied with a music video was the first single from the album, that contained 20 tracks, including 16 newly written materials. Other collaborations include Admiral T, Krys and Slaï. She toured with a number of concerts and notably at the Zénith de Paris on 26 December 2010.

In 2010, she was featured in the French version of Jason Derulo's hit "Whatcha Say".

In 2012, Fanny J left Section Zouk label. Together with Warren, they formed UM Music label that has signed zouk artists Thayna and Axelle Benth. Preparing a new album, she came back with a concert at the Paris Olympia on 7 April 2012.

In 2013, she was featured for the main release from Tropical Family, a tribute album of a French collective for tropical music in the single "Maldòn" originally from Zouk Machine. The new recording also featured Lynnsha and Louisy Joseph.

== Awards ==
- 2008: Artist of the Year / Album of the Year / Song of the Year at the Lindor
- 2008: Artist Revelation of the Year at the Trophées des Arts Afro-Caribéens
- 2009: Best Female Singer at Prix SACEM
- 2009: Concert of the Year at the Lindor
- 2009: Best Music Video for "Mon irréel" (Fanny J featuring Kamnouze), during the Trophées des Arts Afro-Caribéens

== Discography ==
=== Albums ===
Year	Album	Peak positions
Year	Album	FR
2007	Vous les Hommes	50
2010	Secrets de Femme	–
2014	Mes vérités	126

=== Singles ===
Year	Single	Peak positions	Album
Year	Single	FR	Album
2007	"Ancrée à ton port"	12	Vous les Hommes
2017	"Toi et moi"	171	

Featured in

Year	Single	Charts		Album
Year	Single	BEL Wa	FR	Album
2013	"Maldòn" (Tropical Family) (credited to Lynnsha, Fanny J, Louisy Joseph)	15 (Ultratip)	15	From tribute / covers album Tropical Family

Other featured in

- 2010: "Bay Love" (Admiral T feat. Fanny J) in Admiral T's album Instinct Admiral
- 2010: "Whatcha Say" (French version) (Jason Derulo feat. Fanny J)
