= Maldòn =

1989 song by Zouk Machine

Single by Zouk Machine

from the album Maldòn
- B-side: "Lanmou soley"
- Released: May 1990
- Genre: Zouk
- Length: 4:01
- Label: Ariola, EAN
- Songwriters: Guy Houllier, Yves Honoré
- Producers: Guy Houllier, Yves Honoré

Zouk Machine singles chronology
| "Maldòn" (1990) | "Sa ke cho" (1990) |

"Maldòn" is a song by the Guadeloupean band Zouk Machine. Written and produced by Guy Houllier and Yves Honoré, the song is the first single from the album of the same name, and was released in May 1990. In France, it achieved a huge success, topping the singles charts for nine weeks. The same year, German Eurodance band Snap! sampled "Maldòn" for their worldwide hit "Ooops Up".

== Chart performance ==
In France, "Maldòn" debuted at number 40 on the chart edition of 26 May 1990 and reached number one four weeks later, replacing "Bo le lavabo" atop. It stayed for seven weeks at this position, then dropped to number two, being dislodged by Charles D. Lewis's summer hit "Soca Dance"; however, after six weeks at number two, it regained number one for other two weeks, then almost did not stop to fall and fell off the top 50 after 27 weeks of presence. It was the number-one single of the year in France.

On the Eurochart Hot 100, "Maldòn" debuted at number 50 on 23 June 1990, peaked at number five in its fourth week, and totalled 15 weeks in the top ten and 23 weeks on the chart. It ranked number 18 on the European year-end chart. It was also much aired on radio, debuting at number 49 on the European Airplay Chart on 30 June and spending 14 weeks on the top 50 with a peak at number five in its sixth week, and was number one on French both AM and PM airplay charts, for example on 28 July 1990.

== Track listings ==
- 7-inch single
1. "Maldòn" (remix) — 4:01
2. "Lanmou soley" — 5:25
- CD single
1. "Maldòn" (remix) — 4:01
2. "Lanmou soley" — 5:25
- CD maxi
1. "Maldòn" (D.J. remix) — 5:51
2. "Lanmou soley" — 5:25
3. "Maldòn" (remix) — 4:09
- Digital download
1. "Maldòn" (remix) — 4:01

== Charts ==
=== Weekly charts ===
| Chart (1990) | Peak position |
|---|---|
| Belgium (Ultratop 50 Flanders) | 32 |
| Belgium (Ultratop 50 Wallonia) | 3 |
| Europe (European Airplay Top 50) | 5 |
| Europe (European Hot 100) | 5 |
| France (SNEP) | 1 |
| Netherlands (Dutch Top 40) | 9 |
| Netherlands (Single Top 100) | 8 |

=== Year-end charts ===
| Chart (1990) | Position |
|---|---|
| Europe (Eurochart Hot 100) | 18 |
| France (SNEP) | 1 |
| Netherlands (Dutch Top 40) | 54 |
| Netherlands (Single Top 100) | 71 |

== Certifications and sales ==
Certifications for "Maldòn"
| Region | Certification | Certified units/sales |
|---|---|---|
| France (SNEP) | Gold | 400,000^{*} |
^{*} Sales figures based on certification alone.

== Tropical Family version ==
"Maldon"

Single by Tropical Family featuring Lynnsha, Fanny J and Louisy Joseph

from the album Tropical Family
- Released: June 2013
- Recorded: 2013
- Genre: Latin pop
- Label: Play Loud Productions

Lynnsha singles chronology
| "Je veux que tu me mentes" (2008) | "Maldon" (2013) |

Fanny J singles chronology
| "/" | "Maldon" (2013) |

Louisy Joseph singles chronology
| "Chante" (2012) | "Maldon" (2013) |

The Tropical Family, a French collective musical project for cover songs of Tropical music hits included the song "Maldòn" as the first track. The single was interpreted by Lynnsha, Fanny J and Louisy Joseph.

The single entered the SNEP French Singles Chart at number 36 on 8 June 2013 and reached a peak at number 15 on 13 July 2013.

| Chart (2013) | Peak position |
|---|---|
| France (SNEP) | 15 |

=== Other cover versions ===
"Maldon'" was notably covered in a live performance by French actress and singer Valérie Lemercier at the 2007 César Awards ceremony. It was also covered by Jenifer Bartoli, Sandrine Kiberlain and Natasha St-Pier for Les Enfoirés' 2006 album Le Village des Enfoirés and included in a medley named "Medley Vie quotidienne".

== See also ==
- List of number-one singles of 1990 (France)
