= Avec Toi (disambiguation) =

"Avec toi", is a 2012 French song by Axel Tony

"Avec Toi" may also refer to:

- "Avec Toi", a 1966 song and competition entry by Alice Dona
- "Avec Toi", a 1964 song by Soeur Sourire the Singing Nun
- "Avec Toi", a 1970 song by Charles Aznavour
- "Avec Toi", a 1985 B-side song by Celine Dion written by E. Marnay, T. Geoffroy, C. Loigerot
- "Avec Toi", a 1987 B-side song by Cicciolina written by Jay Horus
