= Kolé séré =

1987 single by Philippe Lavil & Jocelyne Beroard

Single by Philippe Lavil & Jocelyne Béroard
- B-side: "Fragile Sara"
- Released: 1987
- Recorded: 1986
- Genre: Zouk
- Length: 3:55
- Label: RCA
- Songwriters: Jean-Claude Naimro, Jocelyne Béroard
- Producers: Bob Socquet, Claude Samard, Philippe Lavil

Jocelyne Béroard singles chronology
"Kay manman" (1986)	"Kolé séré" (1987)	"Milans" (1991)

Philippe Lavil singles chronology
"Elle préfère l'amour en mer" (1985)	"Kolé séré" (1987)	"De Bretagne ou d'ailleurs" (1991)

"Kolé séré" is a 1986 zouk song recorded by Guadelupean band Kassav'. Written by Jocelyne Béroard with a music composed by Jean-Claude Naimro, it was covered the next year as a duet by Béroard with singer Philippe Lavil, and was released as a single in June 1987. This version was a successful hit in France, peaking at number four.

== Background, lyrics and music ==
Written by Béroard with a music by Naimro, "Kolé séré" was first recorded in 1986 by Kassav', the band which Béroard and Naimro were members. Martinique singer Lavil, who liked the song, proposed to Béroard to re-record the song as a duet, which she accepted on the condition that she would sing only in the Creole language; "Kolé séré" is thus sung in the two languages spoken in Martinique (Creole for Béroard, French for Lavil), while the chorus is sung by both singers in Creole. The structure of the original song was reworked to alternate verses and choruses. Lyrically, it deals with a couple who is reuniting by phone after a long time separated. The music video reverses the roles of the two former lovers: Lavil is under the sun of the Antilles, surrounded by palms and the sea, while Béroard sings in the rainy Parisian streets (the Arc de Triomphe can be seen in the background).

== Cover versions ==
In the context of the 2020 lockdown in France, journalist Jean-Pierre Gauffre and wife Françoise proposed a parody of "Kolé séré" which includes many references to COVID-19 and that Nicolas Fauveau of France Bleu would have seen as a potential summer hit.

== Chart performance ==
In France, "Kolé séré" debuted at number 48 on the chart edition of 27 June 1987, performed the biggest jump of the chart in its fourth week with a gain of 23 positions, peaked at number four in its ninth week, and remained for 13 weeks in the top ten and 24 weeks in the top 50. It earned a Silver disc, awarded by the Syndicat National de l'Edition Phonographique. On the European Hot 100 Singles, it entered at number 54 on 1 August 1988, reached a peak of number 24 in its fifth week, and fell off the chart after 19 weeks of presence. It was 74th on the year-end chart.

== Track listings ==
- 7" single
1. "Kolé séré" — 3:55
2. "Fragile Sara" — 4:00 (by Philippe Lavil)
- 12" maxi
1. "Kolé séré" (remix) — 5:22
2. "Fragile Sara" — 4:00 (by Philippe Lavil)
3. "Kolé séré" (radio version) — 3:55

== Personnel ==
- Arrangement – Claude Samard
- Photography – Jeff Manzetti
- Production – Bob Socquet, Claude Samard, Philippe Lavil
- Sleeve – Claude Caudron

== Charts ==
=== Weekly charts ===
Weekly chart performance for "Kolé séré"
Chart (1987)	Peak position
Europe (European Hot 100)	24
France (SNEP)	4
Québec (Francophone chart)	6

=== Year-end charts ===
1987 year-end chart performance for "Kolé séré"
Chart (1987)	Peak position
Europe (European Hot 100)	72

=== Certifications ===
Certifications for "Kolé séré"
Region	Certification	Certified units/sales
France (SNEP)	Silver	250,000^{*}
^{*} Sales figures based on certification alone.

== Release history ==
Release dates for "Kolé séré"
Country	Date	Format	Label
France	1987	7" single	RCA
France	1987	12" maxi	RCA
Canada	1987	7" single	RCA

== See also ==
- Music of Martinique
