= Soca Dance =

Single by Charles D. Lewis

from the album Do You Feel It
- B-side: "My Life, Your Life"
- Released: July 1990
- Recorded: 1990
- Genre: Soca
- Length: 3:39
- Label: Metronome, Baxter Music, Polydor
- Songwriters: Charles D. Lewis, Gary Gordon
- Producer: Gary Gordon

"Soca Dance" is a 1990 song written and recorded by the artist Charles D. Lewis. It was released as a single from his album Do You Feel It and became a summer hit, topping the charts in France and Belgium. The song also gave its name to the dance performed on it.

== Background and writing ==
In France, in 1989, TF1 had sponsored Kaoma's "Lambada", which was a huge success presented by the TV channel as the summer hit. TF1 decided to repeat the experience, seeking a new song combining exoticism and suggestive dance. Finally, "Soca Dance" was chosen. The song was written by the singer Charles D. Lewis himself (he also composed the music) and Gary Gordon-Smith, who also produced it.

== Chart performance ==
In France, "Soca Dance" went straight to number 12 on the chart edition of 14 July 1990, climbed to number seven, then was blocked at number two by Zouk Machine's hit "Maldòn" for two consecutive weeks. Then it topped the chart for six weeks but was dislodged by Zouk Machine, who reached number one again. After that, it almost did not stop dropping, first slowly, then more quickly, remaining for 14 weeks in the top ten and 20 weeks in the 50. It achieved Gold status, awarded by the SNEP. Lewis thus became the first artist from Saint Vincent, Antilles, to reach the top ten in the country, followed in 2004 by Kevin Lyttle with his hit "Turn Me On". "Soca Dance" was also a hit in Belgium (Wallonia), topping the chart for five weeks from 18 August to 15 September 1990 and remaining in the top three for nine weeks; in Flanders, it entered at number 35 on 11 August 1990 and peaked at number five in the eighth week, totalling 12 weeks on the chart. It was also a hit in Germany, where it peaked at number ten in October 1990, but appeared for a single week on the chart at number 30, on 11 November 1990, in Austria. On the pan-Eurochart Hot 100 chart established by the Music & Media magazine, "Soca Dance" started at number 36 on 28 July 1990 and peaked at number three for two weeks, in the ninth and tenth weeks. It totalled nine weeks in the top ten and 20 weeks in the top 100 and ranked at number 25 on the year-end chart. On the European Airplay Top 50, it charted for 13 weeks with a peak at number eight in its sixth week, on 6 October 1990.

== Track listings ==
7" single

1. "Soca Dance" (bajan edit) — 3:56 or 3:39 (according to the editions)
2. "My Life, Your Life" (edit) — 4:23

CD maxi

1. "Soca Dance" (bajan mix) — 6:31
2. "Soca Dance" (bajan edit) — 3:39
3. "My Life, Your Life" (edit) — 4:23

12" maxi

1. "Soca Dance" (bajan mix) — 6:31
2. "Soca Dance" (bajan edit) — 3:39
3. "My Life, Your Life" (edit) — 4:23

== Charts ==
=== Weekly charts ===
Chart (1990)	Peak position
Austria (Ö3 Austria Top 40)	30
Belgium (Ultratop 50 Flanders)	5
Belgium (Ultratop 50 Wallonia)	1
Europe (European Airplay Top 50)	8
Europe (European Hot 100)	3
Finland (Suomen virallinen lista)	10
France (SNEP)	1
Germany (GfK)	10
Netherlands (Dutch Top 40)	28
Netherlands (Single Top 100)	24

=== Year-end charts ===
Chart (1990)	Position
Belgium (Ultratop Flanders)	50
Europe (Eurochart Hot 100)	25
Germany (Official German Charts)	90

== Certifications ==
Certifications for "Soca Dance"
Region	Certification	Certified units/sales
France (SNEP)	Gold	400,000^{*}
^{*} Sales figures based on certification alone.

== See also ==
- List of number-one singles of 1990 (France)
