= Slai =

Slai may refer to:

- Slaï (born 1973), French singer of Guadeloupe origin
- S.L.A.I.: Steel Lancer Arena International, a 2005 Mech Simulator video game
- Slai language
