= Vini Pou =

Studio album by Kassav'
- Released: 1987
- Genre: Zouk
- Label: Columbia
- Producer: Jacob F. Desvarieux

Kassav' chronology
An-ba-chen'n la (1985)	Vini Pou (1987)	Majestik Zouk (1989)

Vini Pou is an album by the Guadeloupean band Kassav', released in 1987. It went gold in its first two weeks of release and was their first album to be widely distributed in the United States. Kassav', as a 16-piece unit, supported the album with a North American tour.

== Production ==
Produced by Jacob F. Desvarieux, the album was recorded in Paris. Vini Pou used five singers; many songs were sung Creole. Earth, Wind & Fire's horn section played on the album.

== Critical reception ==
Professional ratings
Review scores
Source	Rating
AllMusic	3/5 stars
Robert Christgau	B
MusicHound World: The Essential Album Guide	5/5 stars
The Rolling Stone Album Guide	4/5 stars

Robert Christgau called the album "the latest, the longest and the easiest to find LP from the guys who invented world dance music," writing that "the production has gained depth." Newsday noted that "the rhythms are often derived from the buoyant bop of Haiti's cadance and compas, a major element in Zouk." USA Today deemed Vini Pou "primo zouk," noticing the "gloss of disco and soul."

The New York Times wrote that "the songs step out at a brisk clip, their three-chord harmonies lilting in syncopation like a carousel at full tilt; everywhere, the beat stutters and skips behind ear-catching, perfectly calculated riffs or sounds"; Jon Pareles later listed Vini Pou as the best album of 1988. The Washington Post determined that "Zairean guitar licks are offset by American funk and soul horn charts; synth riffs and buoyant vocals harmonies abound, and the dance mixes have a distinctly disco/Euro-pop sheen."

AllMusic labeled the album "one of their weaker efforts." MusicHound World: The Essential Album Guide stated that "the balance between raw rhythm and studio polish is at its apex."

== Track listing ==
No.	Title	Length
1.	"Syé Bwa (Sawing Wood)"
2.	"Flash' (Flash)"
3.	"Souf' Zouk (Breath of Love)"
4.	"Zou (Zou)"
5.	"Soleil (Sun)"
6.	"Ayen Pa Mòl' (Nothing Is the Matter)"
7.	"Zòt' Vini Pou (Others Come For ...)"
8.	"Es' Sé An la Fèt' (Is It a Party)"
9.	"Rosa (Rosa)"
10.	"Palé Mwen Dous' (Tell Me Sweet Things)"
11.	"Chouboulé"
