= Flamme (song) =

Single by Slaï

from the album Fresh / Florilège
- Released: 1999 (originally on album Fresh); 2004 (France, on album Florilège)
- Recorded: 1998
- Label: Sony Music (France, 2004 release)
- Songwriter(s): Slaï, Guy Bordey

Slaï singles chronology
"Flamme" (1999)	"La dernière danse" (2004)

Music video
- "Flamme" on YouTube

Flamme is a famous song by French artist of Guadeloupean descent Slaï (real name Patrice Sylvestre). Song co-written by Slaï and Guy Bordey, it was recorded in late 1990s, it was originally a hit in the Caribbean region, and in Caribbean communities in France.

With the increasing popularity of tropical music in France, it passed to mainstream and French radio stations started playing the song, prompting Sony Music to release it in France in 2004. It became an immediate hit in the summer of 2004, reaching number 4 on SNEP Official French Singles Chart. It was also included once again in the Slaï album Florilège, an album that made it to number 14 on the French Albums Chart. "Flamme" by considered as one of the definitive songs of the tropical sound that became popular in France.

== Covers ==
"Flamme" was picked for a remake in the tribute album Tropical Family, a French collective to rerecord typical popular tropical sounds popular in France. Slaï took part in the project with two tracks ("Les Poèmes de Michelle" from Teri Moïse and "Il jouait du piano debout" from France Gall, the latter as a duo with Mélissa Nkonda). But for the "Flamme" track, it was interpreted by Axel Tony and Layanah and is track number 2 on the album.

The Axel Tony / Layanah version was released as a download and made it to number 118 on the French charts on power of the downloads.

== Charts ==
Slaï song

Chart (2004)	Peak position
Belgium (Ultratop 50 Wallonia)	9
France (SNEP)	4
Switzerland (Schweizer Hitparade)	41

Axel Tony and Layanah version

Chart (2013)	Peak position
France (SNEP)	118
