= Yélélé =

1984 studio album by Kassav'

Yélélé is a 1984 zouk album of Kassav'.

This album marks the onset of the growth of the international recognition of zouk. Its international hit "Zouk la sé sèl médikaman nou ni" (meaning "Zouk is the only medicine we have" in French Antillean Creole) started the zouk dance craze in Latin America and the Caribbean, with interest expanding into other parts of the world.

== Track list ==
1. "Yélélé" 6:50
2. "Tim-Tim Bwa Sek" 4:24
3. "Zouk-la-sé Sel Médikaman Nou Ni" 6:24
4. "Korosol" 3:12
5. "Kavalié O Dam" 6:10
6. "Mwen Di Ou Awa" 4:45
7. "Chwazi" 4:38
8. "Sé Ou Mwen Inmé"

== Covers ==
"Zouk-la-sé Sel Médikaman Nou Ni" would be covered in Spanish as "La Medicina" by Dominican trumpeter, vocalist and arranger Wilfrido Vargas and his big band. This was the title track of his 1985 album, La Medicina.
