= Twi ba =

The twi ba is a percussion instrument, popular within the Caribbean. It is usually used in the folk music of Guadeloupe. The twi ba is a type of idiophone, which is an instrument that makes sound based on the vibrations caused by making contact with the instrument.

The twi ba is used often in ensemble forms. Chouval bwa, biguine, and zouk are all Martinican styles that have been influenced by the use of the twi ba.
