= Louisy Joseph =

French singer (born 1978)

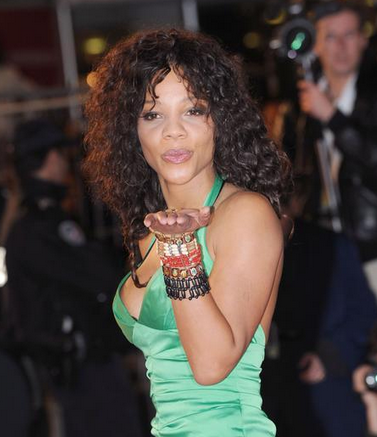
- Louisy-Joseph in 2014

Background information
- Born: Lydy Louisy-Joseph; April 14, 1978 (age 48); Vénissieux, France
- Genres: Pop, soul, reggae
- Occupation: Singer
- Instrument: Vocals
- Years active: 2001–present
- Label: Warner Music France
- Formerly of: L5

Lydy Louisy-Joseph (born 14 April 1978), better known by the shorter name Louisy Joseph, is a French singer of Martinique origin. She first joined the French series of Popstars as part of the girl band L5, and since 2008 has been performing as a solo singer.

== Career ==
Born on 14 April 1978, in Vénissieux, Louisy-Joseph at age 15 to pursue a musical career while continuing hotel studies in Lyon. In 2001, she took part the Lyon musical comedy Salammbô, in the role of Zelda, the fighting woman.

=== Popstars and L5 ===
In 2001, Louisy-Joseph applied as Lydy Louisy-Joseph at the Paris auditions of Popstars in its first season in France broadcast on M6 television station and was picked as a finalist to be part of the girl group L5 where she was mostly known as Lydy. The winning group released their epomynous album, L5 that was certified diamond in 2002. as was the debut single "Toutes les femmes de ta vie" from the album. The follow-up singles from the album did well. Their second album Retiens-moi was certified platinum

=== Solo career ===
In 2006, as the popularity of L5 diminished, the band announced Lydy's departure. Louisy-Joseph started preparing for a debut solo album after a friend advised her to contact Pascal Obispo who agreed to produce her album at his Atlético Music studios, and arranged for a contract with Warner Music France with contributions by John Mamann and Olivier Reine in a soul, reggae and acoustic style far away from the pop style of L5. She also chose to adopt the name Louisy Joseph rather than her full name Lydy Louisy-Joseph, effectively distancing herself from "Lydy of L5" days.

Louisy-Joseph's debut solo album La saison des amours was released on 14 April 2008, the day she turned 30. Her debut solo single "Assis par terre", written by Lionel Florence, was released on 26 May 2008 and hit Top 3 followed by a concert at the Zénith de Nantes, on the occasion of the NRJ Music Tour. In 2008, she was an opening act for Christophe Maé and performed a solo concert with William Baldé at Élysée Montmartre, on 23 June 2008. Her follow-up single, "Mes insomnies" referred to her suffering from insomnia. That was followed by "Imagine de John Lennon" which was a reggae tribute to the artist John Lennon. In September 2008, her album was certified silver. In 2009, she organized a long French tour visiting many smaller venues.

Louisy-Joseph's second album Ma radio was released on 9 July 2012 with "Chante" being her first single from the album with a music video shot in the deserts of California.

In late 2014, Louisy-Joseph became a contestant on the fifth season of TF1's Danse avec les stars.

Louisy-Joseph's third album Music was released on 18 December 2015.

== Discography ==
=== Albums ===
Studio albums

| Year | Album Details | Charts | | | Certification | Notes |
| Year | Album Details | BEL Wa | FR | SWI | Certification | Notes |
|---|---|---|---|---|---|---|
| 2008 | La saison des amours Released: 14 April 2008; Record label: Warner Music France | 47 | 25 | 100 | | Track list: 1. "Assis par terre" 2. "Imagine de John Lennon"; 3. "Mes insomnies" 4. "Laissez faire" 5. "Le spleen de Janis"; 6. "Laisse aller" 7. "Le jour de paye" 8. "Sur la pointe des pieds" 9. "On croit rêver" 10. "Tam-Tams"; 11. "La saison des amours"; Additional tracks on the re-released album: 1. "Assis par terre" 2. "Son of a Preacher Man"; 3. "Work It Out" |
| 2012 | Ma radio Released: 9 July 2012; Record label: Warner Music France | 133 | 74 | – | | Track list: 1. "Chante"; 2. "Pick Up the Pieces (Je te suivrai)" (feat. Jason Derülo); 3. "Le message de nos pères" 4. "Revivre"; 5. "Ma radio" 6. "Si on m'avait dit" 7. "L'âge que tu me donnes" 8. "La bonne personne" 9. "Besoin de rien" 10. "Tu n'iras pas danser" 11. "Le prix à payer" 12. "There Must Be an Angel"; 13. "Goodbye"; 14. "Par amour" 15. "La tête dans ton enfer" 16. "L'âge que tu me donnes (Version alternative)" |
| 2015 | Music; Released: 18 December 2015; Record label: Warner Music France | | | | | Track list: 1. "Music"; 2. "Comme un homme" 3. "Je te hais comme je t'aime" 4. "Le meilleur" 5. "S'il vous play" 6. "Peace a tah (feat Joey Starr & Nathy Boss)"; 7. "First song" 8. "Tout laisser tomber" 9. "Chante (version 2015)"; 10. "Mon histoire" 11. "Religion"; 12. "Le meilleur(remix)" |

=== Singles ===
| Year | Single | Charts | | | Certification | Album |
| Year | Single | BEL Wa | FR | SWI | Certification | Album |
|---|---|---|---|---|---|---|
| 2008 | "Assis par terre" | 9 | 3 | 48 | | La saison des amours |
| 2008 | "Mes insomnies" | – | – | – | | La saison des amours |
| 2009 | "Assis par terre" | – | – | – | | La saison des amours |
| 2012 | "Chante" | – | 157 | – | | Ma radio |

Featured in

| Year | Single | Charts | | Album |
| Year | Single | BEL Wa | FR | Album |
|---|---|---|---|---|
| 2013 | "Maldòn" (Tropical Family) (credited to Lynnsha, Fanny J, Louisy Joseph) | 15 (Ultratip) | 15 | From covers album Tropical Family |
