= Dilemma (Nelly song) =

2002 single by Nelly

Single by Nelly featuring Kelly Rowland

from the album Nellyville
- B-side: "Kings Highway"; "Put Your Hands Up"
- Released: June 25, 2002
- Studio: Right Track Recording (New York City)
- Genre: R&B
- Length: 4:49
- Label: Universal; Columbia
- Songwriters: Cornell Haynes; Antoine "Bam" Macon; Ryan Bowser; Kenneth Gamble; Bunny Sigler
- Producers: Macon; Bowser

Nelly singles chronology
"Hot in Herre" (2002)	"Dilemma" (2002)	"Air Force Ones" (2002)

Kelly Rowland singles chronology
"Separated" (2000)	"Dilemma" (2002)	"Stole" (2002)

Music video
- "Dilemma" on YouTube

"Dilemma" is a song by American rapper Nelly featuring American singer Kelly Rowland. It was released on June 25, 2002, as the second single from the former's second studio album, Nellyville (2002). The song also appeared on Rowland's debut solo studio album, Simply Deep (2002). An R&B ballad, the mid-tempo song consists of a high-pitched intonation and call and response, and contains an interpolation of Patti LaBelle's 1983 song "Love, Need and Want You". The lyrics describe a man infatuated with a woman committed in an existing relationship. "Dilemma" was written by Nelly, Antoine "Bam" Macon and Ryan Bowser, alongside the "Love, Need and Want You" writers, Kenneth Gamble and Bunny Sigler.

"Dilemma" received generally favorable reviews from music critics, who praised the duet's emotional balance. It peaked at number one on the US Billboard Hot 100 for 10 non-consecutive weeks, after it replaced Nelly's previous single "Hot in Herre" on the chart. The song also topped the charts in the United Kingdom, Australia, Ireland, and Germany. "Dilemma" won an award for Best Rap/Sung Performance and was nominated for Record of the Year at the 45th Annual Grammy Awards. An accompanying music video was directed by Benny Boom and released in September 2002. It was filmed on Colonial Street with appearances by Larry Hughes and Patti LaBelle, and depicts Nelly attracted towards his new neighbor Rowland despite the latter being in a relationship.

== Background and release ==
American producer Ryan Bowser created an instrumental that interpolated and contained elements from Patti LaBelle's 1983 song "Love, Need and Want You", written by Kenneth Gamble and Bunny Sigler. Upon hearing the beat given to him by St. Louis producer Antoine "Bam" Macon, Nelly began writing lyrics for the track. He decided to include "Dilemma" as a last-minute addition on his second studio album Nellyville (2002), which was completed prior to Bam giving him the track. Once Nelly returned to the studio to record "Dilemma", he changed his vision to include a female vocalist. Nelly instantly thought of Destiny's Child member Kelly Rowland, whom he met during the Total Request Live (TRL) tour in 2001, and was encouraged by his sister to include her on the song. He called Rowland on the phone, who agreed to record the track. After a few days of recording, during which she re-recorded her part many times to achieve it "just right", "Dilemma" was completed.

Once Nellyville was released in June 2002, radio disc jockeys in the United States started playing "Dilemma". For the week of July 27, 2002, the track reached number eight on the Billboard Hot 100, after it charted at number 26 the previous week. This prompted Nelly to release the song as the album's second single although it was not the original plan. The decision affected the timetable for each Destiny's Child member since they were on hiatus and were expected to release a solo studio album. As part of their strategy, each of them were to be staggered, with member Beyoncé releasing one in October 2002, and Rowland's album expected in early 2003. Their management rescheduled the dates: Rowland released her debut solo album Simply Deep on October 28, 2002, which caused Beyoncé to delay her eventual album Dangerously in Love to June 2003.

== Composition ==
Musically, "Dilemma" is a mid-tempo R&B ballad. The "high-pitched intonation" used in the introduction prior to Rowland's vocals about "loving and needing Nelly" was initially rumored to be created on the Roland M-DC1 in 1995 as "Aaaah! (169)" (originally from D-Train's Misunderstanding), which is used in over 300 songs. Bowser denied using the sample, insisting that he created the sound while experimenting with different vocal techniques. During the song's progression, the sound mellows as the production is "fleshed-out". Nelly raps during each verse while Rowland performs a "twinkling nursery-rhyme chorus". "Dilemma" is centered on Rowland's hook, "No matter what I do / All I think about is you / Even when I'm with my boo / Boy, you know I'm crazy over you", as Nelly responds with the line, "Check it, check it, check it, uh". The lyrics describe the love a man has for a woman committed in an existing relationship, the latter who is conflicted about abandoning. James Hannaham of The Village Voice additionally wrote that it is "an infidelity ballad" which combines mack daddy content with TRL.

== Critical reception ==
AllMusic reviewer Jason Birchmeier noted that "Dilemma" is one of "three well-calculated, standout" tracks in the album. Vice writer Ryan Bassil opined that the song is "the best R&B duet of the modern age" in comparison to Jay-Z's 2002 song "'03 Bonnie & Clyde", stating that it had soul, passion, and feeling. In her review for Simply Deep, Caroline Sullivan of The Guardian wrote that it "practically peeled off its clothes on the spot", and Nathan Rabin of The A.V. Club commented that it "navigates the fine line separating sweet from saccharine". Spin staff member Andrew Unterberger called "Dilemma" a "puppy-love duet", while Blender staff described the song as a "capable ballad". However, Soren Baker of the Chicago Tribune stated that the "pseudo-ballad" lacked spunk and was "hardly worth the bother". Writing for The Washington Post, Arion Berger critiqued that the "neo-R&B" song was a "requisite lull" in his review of Nellyville.

"Dilemma" won a Grammy Award for Best Rap/Sung Performance at the 45th Annual Grammy Awards on February 23, 2003.

== Commercial performance ==
"Dilemma" debuted on several Billboard charts on the week of July 6, 2002, at numbers 66 and 63 on the Hot R&B/Hip-Hop Songs and R&B/Hip-Hop Airplay charts respectively. The next week, it debuted at number 51 on the Radio Songs chart, as well as at number 53 on the Hot 100 during the same week. After four weeks, on the issue dated August 17, 2002, "Dilemma" peaked at number one on the Billboard Hot 100, where it stayed there for 10 weeks and remained on the chart for 29 weeks. With this song, Nelly replaced himself from the top of the chart, as his previous single "Hot In Herre" dropped to number two while "Dilemma" ascended from number two to number one. This surprised Nelly's record label, as they did not expect the song to instantly become popular and did not film a music video during its release. "Dilemma" topped the Mainstream Top 40 chart on the week of September 21, 2002. The song was ranked at number 11 on the Billboard Hot 100 decade-end list from 2000 to 2009, and placed at the number 75 position on the listicle of all-time songs to chart on the Billboard Hot 100.

On the UK Singles Chart dated October 26, 2002, "Dilemma" topped the chart, where it remained at the position for two weeks, before charting for 24 total weeks. The song sold 208,000 copies in the first week and 129,000 copies the following week, which prevented Justin Timberlake's 2002 debut solo single "Like I Love You" from the number one position. It was the fourth-best selling single in the United Kingdom in 2002, and was the 23rd highest-selling single in the country from 2000 to 2009. As of October 2016, "Dilemma" is the most successful song in both Nelly and Rowland's discographies. As of February 2021, the song has sold over 7 million copies worldwide. The song was also successful in mainland Europe, topping the Dutch, Flemish, German, Irish, and Swiss charts. In entered the top five in Austria, Croatia, Denmark, Hungary, Italy, Norway, Poland, and Sweden, as well as the top 10 in Finland, France, and Greece.

On April 22, 2025, the song reached one billion views on Spotify, which was Nelly and Rowland's first video to accomplish the feat.

== Music video ==
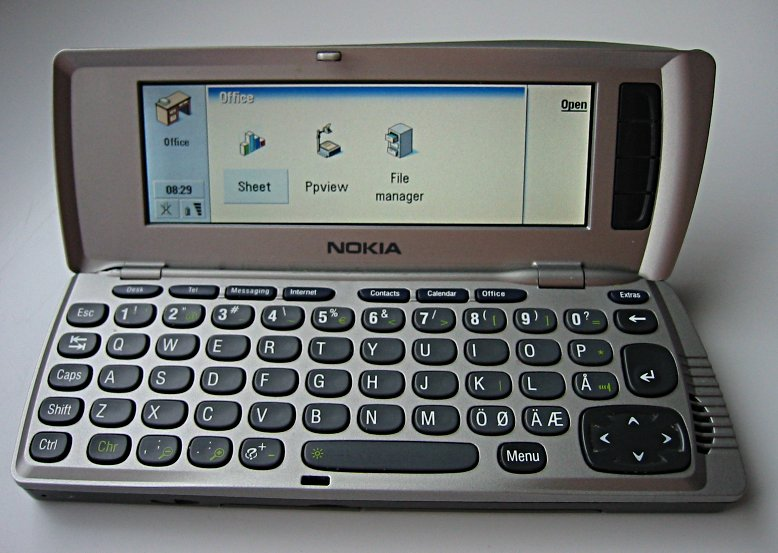
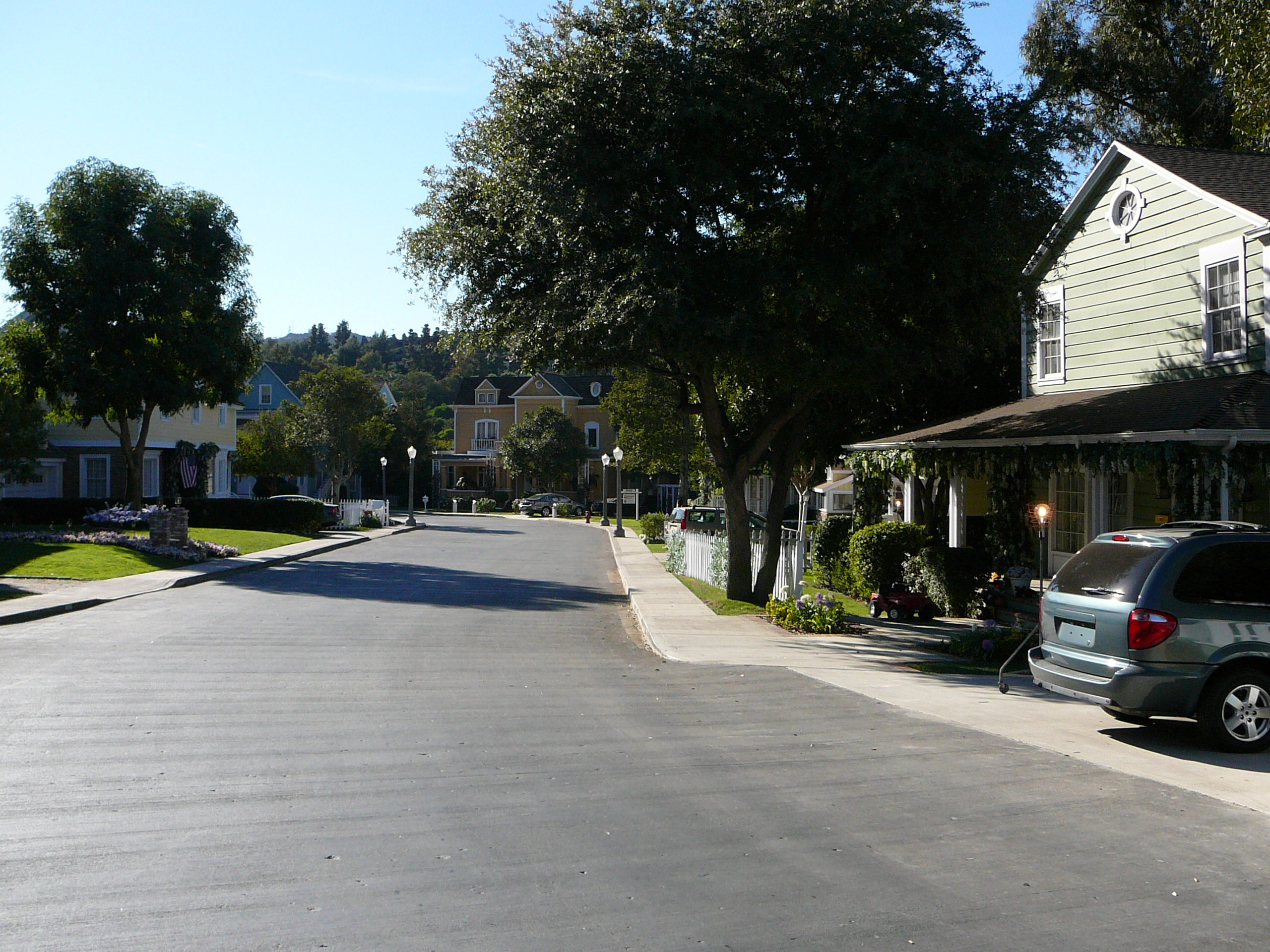
In the music video for "Dilemma", Rowland used a Nokia 9210 Communicator to text Nelly on a spreadsheet application, and was filmed on Colonial Street to portray Nellyville.

=== Background ===
An accompanying music video for "Dilemma" was planned in July 2002, prior to its release as the second single from Nellyville. Nelly wanted the video to be "smooth" in contrast to his previous music videos, in order to emphasize on the storyline. It was directed by Benny Boom and filmed from August 19 to 21, 2002. The film set was located on Colonial Street, which was one of the backlot street sets located at Universal Studios Hollywood in the San Fernando Valley area of Los Angeles County, California. Then-Washington Wizards player Larry Hughes appeared in the video as Rowland's boyfriend, while Patti LaBelle was cast as her mother. The music video premiered at the end of MTV's Making the Video episode aired in September 2002.

Rowland described the plot, stating that she was "the new girl in the neighborhood" who became infatuated with Nelly living across the street despite having a partner and children, which resulted in a "dilemma". At one point in the video, Rowland is seen attempting to text Nelly on a spreadsheet application (Note: While most sources identify the application as "Microsoft Excel", the software used by Rowland was the default Sheet application included with the Symbian operating system on the Nokia 9210; the phone is however compatible with Microsoft Excel spreadsheets.) using her Nokia 9210 Communicator. Nelly defended the use of the application in an interview with Australian talk show The Project in November 2016, explaining that it was used during the time despite eventually becoming outdated. In subsequent interviews, Rowland admitted to not knowing what Microsoft Excel was, which elicited a response from the application's official Twitter account.

=== Synopsis ===
The music video introduces the fictional neighborhood of Nellyville, as the eponymous song is briefly heard. "Dilemma" begins as Nelly and Rowland sit on the front porch of their respective houses. Rowland and LaBelle portray a mother-daughter pair who have recently moved into the house opposite the street from Nelly, with the latter sporting a 4XL t-shirt and headband. They both greet each other as the moving van drives into Rowland's house. However, Rowland's boyfriend arrives and confronts her for communicating with Nelly, and they proceed to drive away. The next scene shows Nelly and Rowland encountering each other in a record shop. Rowland quickly exits upon noticing him while simultaneously appearing conflicted.

Rowland messages Nelly on her phone from inside her bedroom in another scene, as sequences of both musicians flirting together in front of a car are sporadically intercut. Rowland and her boyfriend queue inside a movie theater when Nelly walks opposite them with his girlfriend. They exchange glances while walking away from each other with their respective partners. In the final scene, LaBelle opens the front door of her house and repeatedly demands for her daughter to return inside, while the couple continue dancing outside throughout the night.

=== Reception ===
In a retrospective review, Ashley Perkins of Vibe acknowledged how the music video contained "just the right amount of dramatization to allow a glimpse into how much of a dilemma Nelly and Kelly's situationship was". She further explained that the narrative was explained "in a light other than from the perspective of the frustrated and faithful counterpart or the creeping side piece", which would later be replicated in songs such as "Situationships" by Fabolous, and "Distraction" by Kehlani. Bassil opined that the visuals contained "sartorial [color] coordination" and commented that Nelly's "dickhead"-styled clothing allowed him to dance alongside Rowland throughout the night.

On July 12, 2021, the music video reached one billion views on YouTube, which was Nelly and Rowland's first video to accomplish the feat. It was the third hip hop music video released before the website's existence to record one billion views, following "In da Club" by 50 Cent and "Without Me" by Eminem.

== Remix and sequel ==
The official remix for "Dilemma" was produced by Jermaine Dupri, and features Rowland and Ali of the St. Lunatics. It was included on Nelly's remix album titled Da Derrty Versions: The Reinvention (2003). Writing in a review for the album for RapReviews.com, Steve Juon criticized the bass guitar in the remix and stated that the song "should have been left alone", while Katharina Lobeck of BBC opined that the original song "worked better" and is "more coherent" than the remix.

On December 16, 2009, Nelly recorded a song titled "Gone" with Rowland, which he initially dubbed as "Dilemma Part 2". Nelly eventually retracted the statement, insisting that he did not want to replicate or diminish the original song but wanted to extend on the story and rekindle the chemistry he had with Rowland. "Gone" was written by Nelly, Rico Love, Earl Hood, Eric Goody II, and the producer Jim Jonsin. It was included on Nelly's sixth studio album 5.0 (2010), and distributed to urban contemporary radio stations as its third single on January 4, 2011.

== Cover version and in popular culture ==
Japanese singer-songwriter Riri performed a cover of "Dilemma", which was included on her third extended play Summertime (2019). It featured Japanese rapper JP the Wavy, and was produced by DJ Chari and DJ Tatsuki, with the beat created by Zot on the Wave & Lil' Yukich. The song debuted at number one on the Japanese iTunes hip-hop chart. Both artists were familiar with the original song in their youth and decided to create a reinterpretation of it.

On the episode of Lip Sync Battle dated January 14, 2016, American actress Olivia Munn performed a lip sync of "Dilemma" while competing against actor Kevin Hart. Munn initially imitated Nelly's appearance by wearing a hat, bandana, and band-aid, but removed the accessories in order to portray Rowland. During season 21 of The Voice in the episode aired on October 12, 2021, two contestants on coach Ariana Grande's team competed in a cover performance of the song during the Battles round, which was positively received by the four coaches.

== Track listings ==
US 12-inch single

Side A
No.	Title	Length
1.	"Dilemma" (clean)	4:49
2.	"Dilemma" (dirty)	4:49
3.	"Dilemma" (instrumental)	4:49

Side B
No.	Title	Length
1.	"Air Force Ones" (clean)	5:04
2.	"Air Force Ones" (dirty)	5:04
3.	"Air Force Ones" (instrumental)	5:04

UK 12-inch single

No.	Title	Length
1.	"Dilemma" (radio edit)	3:59
2.	"Dilemma" (G4orce radio edit)	3:30
3.	"Dilemma" (Jason Nevins club mix)	6:21

UK maxi single

No.	Title	Length
1.	"Dilemma" (radio edit)	3:59
2.	"Dilemma" (Jason Nevins remix edit)	4:34
3.	"Kings Highway"	5:31
4.	"Dilemma" (video)

Canadian CD single

No.	Title	Length
1.	"Dilemma" (album version)	4:49
2.	"Kings Highway"	5:31

Australian maxi single

No.	Title	Length
1.	"Dilemma" (album version)	4:49
2.	"Dilemma" (Jason Nevins remix edit)	4:30
3.	"Dilemma" (G4CE full vocal remix)	5:57
4.	"Put Your Hands Up"	5:17
5.	"Dilemma" (video)

European maxi single

No.	Title	Length
1.	"Dilemma" (radio edit)	3:59
2.	"Dilemma" (DJ Desue edit)	4:15
3.	"Dilemma" (Jason Nevins remix edit)	4:30
4.	"Kings Highway"	5:31
5.	"Dilemma" (video) (enhanced)

== Credits and personnel ==
Credits adapted from the back cover of "Dilemma".

- Lyrics written by K. Gamble, B. Sigler, Nelly
- Music written by Bam and Ryan Bowser
- Contains elements of "Love, Need and Want You"
- Produced by Bam and Ryan Bowser

== Charts ==
=== Weekly charts ===
2002–2003 weekly chart performance for "Dilemma"
Chart (2002–2003)	Peak position
Australia (ARIA)	1
Australian Urban (ARIA)	1
Austria (Ö3 Austria Top 40)	2
Belgium (Ultratop 50 Flanders)	1
Belgium (Ultratop 50 Wallonia)	3
Canada (Nielsen SoundScan)	3
Costa Rica (Notimex)	3
Croatia (HRT)	3
Czech Republic (IFPI)	4
Denmark (Tracklisten)	2
Ecuador (Notimex)	2
Europe (Eurochart Hot 100)	2
Finland (Suomen virallinen lista)	10
France (SNEP)	6
Germany (GfK)	1
Greece (IFPI)	9
Hungary (Rádiós Top 40)	1
Hungary (Single Top 40)	2
Ireland (IRMA)	1
Italy (FIMI)	3
Netherlands (Dutch Top 40)	1
Netherlands (Single Top 100)	1
New Zealand (Recorded Music NZ)	2
Nicaragua (Notimex)	2
Norway (VG-lista)	2
Poland (Polish Singles Chart)	2
Romania (Romanian Top 100)	5
Scottish Singles Sales (Official Charts)	1
Sweden (Sverigetopplistan)	2
Switzerland (Schweizer Hitparade)	1
UK Singles (Official Charts)	1
UK Hip Hop/R&B (Official Charts)	1
US Billboard Hot 100	1
US Hot R&B/Hip-Hop Songs (Billboard)	1
US Hot Rap Songs (Billboard)	1
US Pop Airplay (Billboard)	1
US Rhythmic Airplay (Billboard)	1

2013 weekly chart performance for "Dilemma"
Chart (2013)	Peak position
Scottish Singles Sales (Official Charts)	56
UK Singles (Official Charts)	51
UK Hip Hop/R&B (Official Charts)	12

2025 weekly chart performance for "Dilemma"
Chart (2025)	Peak position
Moldova Airplay (TopHit)	56

=== Monthly charts ===
Monthly chart performance for "Dilemma"
Chart (2025)	Peak position
Moldova Airplay (TopHit)	68

=== Year-end charts ===
2002 year-end chart performance for "Dilemma"
Chart (2002)	Position
Australia (ARIA)	4
Australian Urban (ARIA)	2
Austria (Ö3 Austria Top 40)	45
Belgium (Ultratop 50 Flanders)	9
Belgium (Ultratop 50 Wallonia)	27
Canada (Nielsen SoundScan)	12
Canada Radio (Nielsen BDS)	68
Europe (Eurochart Hot 100)	10
France (SNEP)	45
Germany (Media Control)	15
Ireland (IRMA)	5
Netherlands (Dutch Top 40)	33
Netherlands (Single Top 100)	4
New Zealand (RIANZ)	27
Sweden (Hitlistan)	14
Switzerland (Schweizer Hitparade)	6
UK Singles (OCC)	4
UK Airplay (Music Week)	7
UK Urban (Music Week)	20
US Billboard Hot 100	4
US Hot R&B/Hip-Hop Singles & Tracks (Billboard)	6
US Mainstream Top 40 (Billboard)	12
US Rhythmic Top 40 (Billboard)	4

2003 year-end chart performance for "Dilemma"
Chart (2003)	Position
Australia (ARIA)	26
Australian Urban (ARIA)	13
Austria (Ö3 Austria Top 40)	53
Belgium (Ultratop 50 Flanders)	66
Belgium (Ultratop 50 Wallonia)	56
Brazil (Crowley)	4
Colombia (B & V Marketing)	1
Germany (Media Control GfK)	53
Netherlands (Dutch Top 40)	94
Netherlands (Single Top 100)	56
Romania (Romanian Top 100)	50
Switzerland (Schweizer Hitparade)	71
UK Singles (OCC)	162

=== Decade-end charts ===
Decade-end chart performance for "Dilemma"
Chart (2000–2009)	Position
Australia (ARIA)	20
Germany (Official German Charts)	51
Netherlands (Single Top 100)	24
UK Singles (OCC)	22
US Billboard Hot 100	11

== Certifications ==
Certifications and sales for "Dilemma"
Region	Certification	Certified units/sales
Australia (ARIA)	3× Platinum	210,000^{^}
Austria (IFPI Austria)	Gold	15,000^{*}
Belgium (BRMA)	Platinum	50,000^{*}
Brazil (Pro-Música Brasil)	Gold	30,000^{‡}
Denmark (IFPI Danmark)	Platinum	90,000^{‡}
France (SNEP)	Gold	250,000^{*}
Germany (BVMI)	Gold	250,000^{^}
Italy (FIMI) sales since 2009	Gold	35,000^{‡}
Japan (RIAJ) Full-length ringtone	Platinum	250,000^{*}
Japan (RIAJ) Ringtone	Million	1,000,000^{*}
Netherlands (NVPI)	Gold	40,000^{^}
New Zealand (RMNZ)	5× Platinum	150,000^{‡}
Norway (IFPI Norway)	2× Platinum	20,000^{*}
Spain (Promusicae)	Gold	30,000^{‡}
Sweden (GLF)	Gold	15,000^{^}
Switzerland (IFPI Switzerland)	Platinum	40,000^{^}
United Kingdom (BPI) Sales since 2004	4× Platinum	2,400,000^{‡}
^{*} Sales figures based on certification alone.^{^} Shipments figures based on certification alone.^{‡} Sales+streaming figures based on certification alone.

== Release history ==
Release dates and formats for "Dilemma"
Region	Date	Format(s)	Label(s)	Ref(s).
United States	June 25, 2002	Airplay	Universal	
Australia	October 14, 2002	CD single	Universal	
United Kingdom	October 14, 2002	12-inch single; cassette single; CD single	Universal	

== Papi Sánchez version ==
"Dilema"

Single by Papi Sánchez

from the album Yeah Baby !!
- Language: Spanish
- Released: 2004
- Length: 4:02
- Label: Sony BMG
- Songwriters: Antoine Macon; Cornell Haynes; Kenneth Gamble; Bunny Sigler

Papi Sánchez singles chronology
"Enamórame" (2003)	"Dilema" (2004)	"Mano' Pa' Arriba" (2006)

Music video
- "Dilema" on YouTube

"Dilemma" was covered in Spanish by Dominican merengue artist Papi Sánchez, under the title "Dilema". It was released as the second single from his studio album Yeah Baby !! in 2004. "Dilema" peaked at number eight on the Belgium (Wallonia) chart dated May 28, 2005, where it remained for 14 weeks. The song charted at number 16 on the Belgium (Flanders) chart, and at number 20 on the French Syndicat National de l'Édition Phonographique (SNEP).

=== Track listing ===
Belgian CD single

No.	Title	Length
1.	"Dilema" (original radio mix)	4:02
2.	"Dilema" (instrumental mix)	4:02

French CD single

No.	Title	Length
1.	"Dilema"	4:02
2.	"Déjame Ser"	3:50

=== Charts ===
==== Weekly charts ====
Weekly chart performance for "Dilema"
Chart (2004–2005)	Peak position
Belgium (Ultratop 50 Flanders)	16
Belgium (Ultratop 50 Wallonia)	8
France (SNEP)	20
Netherlands (Single Top 100)	66
US Latin Tropical Airplay (Billboard)	35

==== Year-end charts ====
Year-end chart performance for "Dilema" in 2005
Chart (2005)	Position
Belgium (Ultratop 50 Flanders)	90
Belgium (Ultratop 50 Wallonia)	55

== Sigma version ==
"Dilemma"

Single by Sigma

from the album Hope
- Released: July 12, 2019
- Length: 2:40
- Label: 3Beat
- Songwriters: Kenneth Gamble; Cornell Haynes; Bunny Sigler; Antoine Macon
- Producer: Sigma

Sigma singles chronology
"Here We Go Again" (2019)	"Dilemma" (2019)	"You and Me as One" (2019)

Music video
- "Dilemma" on YouTube

A remix of "Dilemma" was recorded by British production duo Sigma and released through 3 Beat Records on streaming and digital download formats on July 12, 2019. It contains tropical drum and bass beats, with a hi-NRG sound implemented in the chorus. An accompanying music video was released on August 2, 2019.

=== Release history ===
Release dates and formats for "Dilemma"
Region	Date	Format(s)	Label(s)	Ref(s).
Various	July 12, 2019	Digital download; streaming	3Beat	
