= Lynnsha =

French R'n'B singer of Martinique origin

- Born: Sophie Jordier; 4 January 1979 (age 47); Brest, France
- Genres: R&B; zouk
- Occupation: Singer
- Years active: 2001 – present
- Label: ISSAP Productions

Sophie Jordier (born in France on 4 January 1979), better known by her stage name Lynnsha, is a French R&B-zouk singer. She has released four albums, self-titled Lynnsha (2004), Elle & moi (2008), Île & moi (2013) & Over & Other (2018).

== Career ==
Lynnsha started singing in choirs at the age of five became a lead chorist in an Afro-Caribbean formation and also sang in French choirs.

In 1995, she is discovered by Kaysha who hires her to do backing vocals for Kim, and then for his 1998 album "I'm ready" and other productions.

Lord Kossity proposed for her to sing on his song "Lova Girl" in 2001. She was also featured on Lady Laistee single "Diamant noir" on her debut album. After taking part in Admiral T album, she was featured in "Secret Lover" with Wyclef Jean and in "Trop de peine" as a duet with Calbo from the band Arsenik. She was also part of the musical project "Dis L'Heure 2 Zouk" and had big chart success called "Ma rivale" that reached number on SNEP French Singles Chart.

In 2001, Kaysha introduces Lynnsha to Passi who signs her to his own label ISSAP Productions where she had her own self-titled debut album Lynnsha in June 2004. Her most successful single was "Hommes... femmes" taken from the album featuring D. Dy. It reached number 2 on French SNEP chart, also charting in Belgian and Swiss French markets.

In May 2008, she released her follow-up album Elle & moi with relative success.

In 2013 she releases her third album "Île et moi" on Kaysha's label Sushiraw. An album with the sonorities of her Island, Martinique.

Craig David invited her to do the French version of "Walking Away", whereas Nek did the Italian version, Álex Ubago the Spanish version and Monrose the German one.

2018 new album "Over & Other"

== Discography ==
=== Albums ===
Year	Album	Peak positions	Notes
Year	Album	FR	Notes
2004	Lynnsha	116	Track list: 1. "Homme... Femmes" (Feat D. Dy); 2. "S'évader"; 3. "Rendez-Vous (mobash)" 4. "Everybody Say...(prendre le contrôle)" 5. "Tomber à genoux" 6. "Le temps" (Duet With Faudel); 7. "Si loin de toi" 8. "Reflets du passé" (Duet With Passi); 9. "Interlude"; 10. "Après les larmes" 11. "Ma rivale" (Feat Sweety); 12. "Tout Changer"; 13. "Outro"; 14. "Dip It Low" (Christina Milian featuring Lynnsha); 15. "Je veux juste chanter"
2008	Elle & moi	78	Track list: 1. "L.Y.N.N.S.H.A"; 2. "Je veux que tu me mentes" 3. "Ça passe ou ça casse" 4. "En coulisse" 5. "Désolée"; 6. "Comme un poisson" 7. "L'amour l'emportera' 8. "Si seulement" 9. "Vie (Je n’attends que toi)" 10. "I'm readex (outro)" 11. "Je promets" 12. "Mon cœur est ma raison" 13. "Juste un mot" 14. "T'as trop déconné"

=== Singles ===
Year	Single	Peak positions			Certification	Album
Year	Single	FR	BEL (Wa)	SUI	Certification	Album
2003	"Trop de peine" (feat. Calbo)	64	–	–		
2004	"Rendez-vous (Mobach)"	44	–	–		
2004	"Hommes... femmes" (feat. D. Dy)	2	4	31		
2008	"Je veux que tu me mentes"	17	–	–		
2013	"Maldòn" (Tropical Family) (credited to Lynnsha, Fanny J, Louisy Joseph)	15	15 (Ultratip)	–		The covers album Tropical Family

Featured in

Year	Single	Peak positions	Album
Year	Single	FR	Album
2002	"Diamant noir" (Lady Laistee feat. Lynnsha)	56	

as Dis L'Heure 2 Zouk

Year	Single	Peak positions			Certification	Album
Year	Single	FR	BEL (Wa)	SUI	Certification	Album
2003	"Ma rivale" (Dis L'Heure 2 Zouk – (Lynnsha – Sweety feat. Jacob Desvarieux))	3	24	31		
