= Les Aiglons =

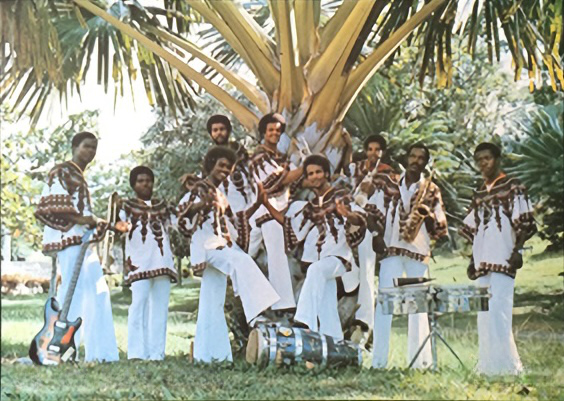

Background information
- Origin: Guadeloupe
- Genres: Kadans; Cadence-lypso; Zouk
- Years active: 1970-present
- Labels: Debs music
- Members: Pierre D'Alexis; Alain D'Alexis; Michel D'Alexis; Michel Nerplat
- Website: http://aiglons97100.skyrock.com/

Les Aiglons was a 1970s Guadeloupean cadence band. Their single "Cuisse-la" was the greatest selling record of any Antillean band until Kassav's Zouk la sé sèl médikaman nou ni in 1985.

== History ==
Les Aiglons was a classic Guadeloupean band of the '70s kadans era who were heavily influenced by the Haitian music that overwhelmed the Antilles from the late '50s' to the early 80s. The full-horn section kadans band Exile One led by Gordon Henderson was the first to introduce the newly arrived synthesizers to their music that other young cadence or compas bands from Haiti (mini-jazz) and the French Antilles emulated in the 1970s. les Aiglons took it to another level after creating "Cuisse-la" a style that featured a full-horn section and synthesizers.

The band broke up quietly after the album Bon'm La, but two members went on to form Love Stars in 1988. The group later reunited and released several more albums in the 2000s.

== Discography ==
All releases are on Debs music

- Les Aiglons (1974)
- Cong'La (1975)
- Pas mal paler Michou (1975)
- Cadence Magma (1976)
- Le Disque des Vacances (1976)
- Le Petit Chaperon Noir (1977)
- Henri Debs & Les Aiglons + Le Combo Sensationnel (1978)
- Michel D'Alexis Et Son Orchestre Les Aiglons (1978)
- Jouent Christian Léon (1978)
- Hors Concours (1979)
- Le Patron (1980)
- La Puissance Des Aiglons (1980)
- Les Aiglons (1982)
- Le Cerveau (1983)
- Le Coeur De Michou (1984)
- Bidimbo Ay Lopital (1985)
- Bonm La (1986)
- Le Poid Lourd (2002)
- Konkirans (2004)
- Vizyon la Vi (2006)
