= Enamórame =

Single by Papi Sánchez

from the album Enamorame
- B-side: "Miami remix"
- Released: 2003
- Recorded: 2003
- Genre: Merengue
- Length: 3:42
- Label: Sony Bmg Music, Scorpio
- Songwriters: Levitt Policalpe, Robert José Léon de Sanchez

Papi Sánchez singles chronology
"Enamórame" (2003)	"Dilemma" (2005)

"Enamórame" (Make Me Fall in Love) is a song recorded and produced by Dominican singer Papi Sánchez, written by Levitt Policalpe and Robert José Léon de Sánchez. It is his debut single from his album Enamorame and was released in 2003 in the United States and reached number three on the Billboard Tropical Songs chart. At the 2004 Latin Billboard Music Awards, the song received a nomination for "Tropical Airplay Track of the Year by a New Artist".

== Chart performance ==
"Enamórame" enjoyed a commercial success in France where it was released late 2004 and reached number two for four weeks, spent 13 weeks in the top ten and earned a gold disc. As of August 2014, it was the 55th best-selling single of the 21st century in France, with 380,000 units sold. It was also a hit in Belgium, both in Flanders and Wallonia, where it peaked in the top ten.

== Cover versions ==
In 2013, the song was covered by Tropical Family under the name "Enamorame (Oui bébé)", sung by DJ Assad with vocals by Papi Sanchez and Luyanna. It was released digitally as promotional single in January 2014 and reached number 24 on the Belgian Ultratip Chart.

== Track listings ==
CD single

1. "Enamórame" (radio mix) - 3:42
2. "Enamórame" (miami remix) - 4:08

== Charts ==
=== Weekly charts ===
Chart (2004–2005)	Peak position
Austria (Ö3 Austria Top 40)	50
Belgium (Ultratop 50 Flanders)	6
Belgium (Ultratop 50 Wallonia)	2
France (SNEP)	2
Germany (GfK)	56
Italy (FIMI)	35
Netherlands (Dutch Top 40 Tipparade)	6
Netherlands (Single Top 100)	25
Russia Airplay (TopHit)	12
Switzerland (Schweizer Hitparade)	12
US Hot Latin Songs (Billboard)	43
US Tropical Airplay (Billboard)	3

Chart (2014)	Peak position
Belgian (Wallonia) Dance Chart	48
Belgian (Wallonia) Ultratip Chart	24

=== Year-end charts ===
Chart (2004)	Position
France (SNEP)	13

Chart (2005)	Position
Belgium (Ultratop Flanders)	25
Belgium (Ultratop Wallonia)	31
France (SNEP)	64
Russia Airplay (TopHit)	122
Switzerland (Schweizer Hitparade)	86

=== Certifications ===
Country	Certification	Certified sales
Belgium	Gold	25,000
France	Gold	250,000
