= Jocelyne Béroard =

French singer (born 1954)

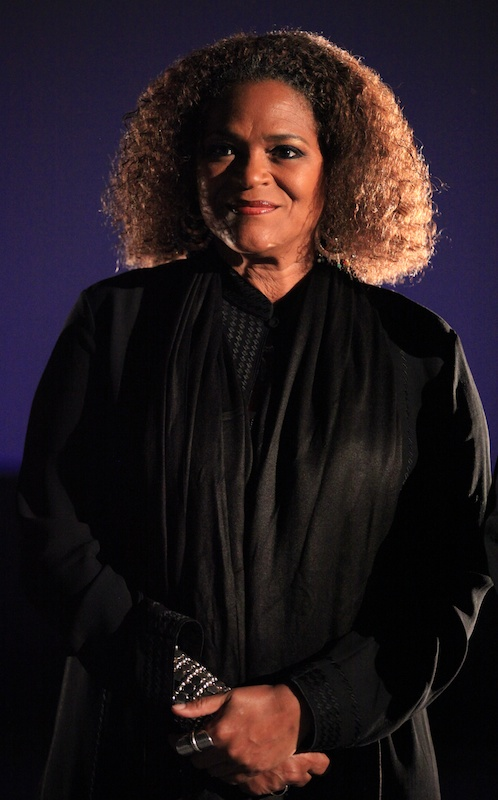
- Jocelyne Beroard

Background information
- Born: 12 September 1954 (age 71); Fort-de-France, Martinique
- Genres: Zouk; jazz
- Occupations: Singer; actress
- Instrument: Vocals
- Years active: 1980s–present
- Labels: EMI; Olivi; CBS; Georges DEBS
- Members: Kassav'

Jocelyne Béroard (born 12 September 1954) is a French singer. She is one of the lead singers of the Zouk band Kassav'. As a solo artist, she helped create zouk Beton, a music genre originated by the seminal Guadeloupean Creole band Kassav' from Paris, the main members of which are from Guadeloupe and Martinique.

== Biography ==
Béroard was born in Fort-de-France, Martinique, and studied in France, attending the National School of Fine Arts in Paris, before beginning to work with Caribbean artistes as a background singer in 1980. She has served as a lead singer of Kassav' since 1983. She has also recorded several albums as a solo artist. In 1986, she won a Gold Disc for her album Siwo (the all-time biggest seller for an album by a female in the West Indies). In 1987, she recorded the hit single "Kolé séré", a duet with Philippe Lavil that peaked at number four in France. In 1999, she was made a Chevalier de la Légion d’Honneur.

In 2014, she sang "On n'oublie pas" (written by Serge Bilé) with several artists and personalities including Alpha Blondy, Harry Roselmack and Admiral T. This song is a tribute to the 152 victims from Martinique of the crash of 16 August 2005, to remember this event and to help the AVCA, the association of the victims of the air disaster, to raise funds.

She helped American singer-songwriter Jimmy Buffett write the song "Love and Luck", which appeared on the compilation album Boats, Beaches, Bars & Ballads. The song mentions the Kassav song "Kolé Sére".

On 1 April 2019, it was announced on Kassav's official Facebook page that Béroard was to marry her longtime fellow Jacob Desvarieux, singer and musician of the band and that the festivities were to take place on the day Kassav' will celebrate their 40 years. The announcement later proved to be a joke for April Fools' Day.

== Discography ==
Year	Album	Label
1986	Siwo	Georges DEBS
1991	Milans	CBS
2001	Kole Sere	Olivi
2004	Madousinay	EMI

== Filmography ==
=== Feature films ===
Year	Title	Role	Notes
1992	Siméon	Roselyne	
2005	Nèg maron	Josua's mother	
2016	Le Gang des Antillais	the godmother	

=== Short films ===
Year	Title	Role	Notes
2017	Crossing Away	Nadine	a.k.a. Passagers. For the Tenth anniversary of the crash of the Martinique-Panama plane

=== Television ===
Year	Title	Role	Notes
2015	Rose and the Soldier	Clémence	a.k.a. Rose et le soldat.
2017	Le rêve français	Betty	

== Awards and recognition ==
=== Honours ===
- Legion of Honour
  - 1999 – Chevalier (Knight) of the Legion of Honour
  - 2014 – Officier (Officer) of the Legion of Honour

=== Awards ===
Sources:

- Prix SACEM SACEM Martinique Best Female (1991)
- Prix SACEM Martinique of Best Songwriter ( for Ké sa lévé, 1995)
- Prix SACEM SACEM Martinique Best Female (for Ahidjéré, song of the movie L’Exil de Behanzin, 1997)
- Prix SACEM Martinique of Best Songwriter (for Eti’w, co-authored by Dédé Saint Prix, 1995)
- Prix SACEM SACEM Martinique Best Female et Prix SACEM SACEM Martinique Best Ballad (with Giles Voyer) (for Pou I pe sa Tjenbe, 2008)

== Bibliography ==
- Gladys M. Francis, " Résister au compromis, crever la douleur, dire le silence : Entretien avec Jocelyne Béroard." Amour, sexe genre et trauma dans la Caraïbe Francophone. Coll. Espaces Littéraires, L'Harmattan, Paris, 2016, p. 227–250 (ISBN 978-2-3430-7395-8)
- Béroard, Jocelyne; Dicale, Bertrand (2022). Loin de l'amer (autobiography) (in French). Le Cherche Midi. ISBN 978-2-7491-3553-3. OCLC 1317692046.
