= Axel Tony =

French singer (born 1984)

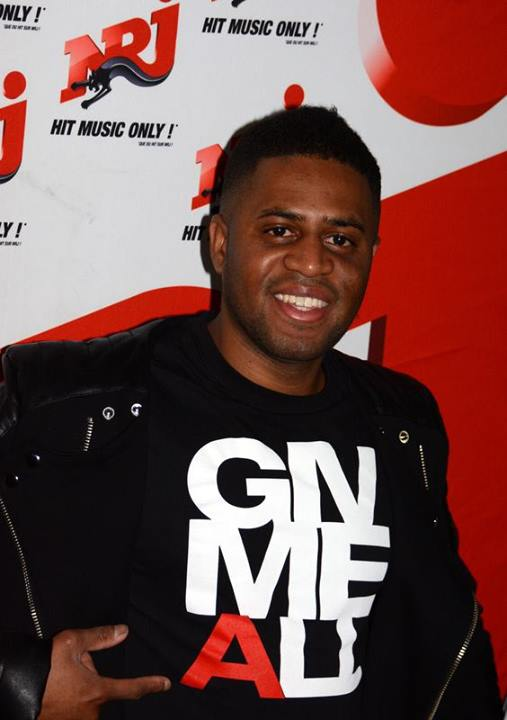
- Tony in 2013

Background information
- Born: 1984 (age 41–42); Colombes, France
- Origin: French of mixed Cameroonian and Antilles origin
- Genres: Zouk, R&B, soul, fusion
- Occupation: Singer
- Instrument: Vocals
- Years active: 2006 – present
- Label: Universal Music France
- Website: www.axeltony.fr

Axel Tony (born in Colombes in 1984) is a French singer of mixed Cameroonian / Martinique / Vietnamese origin. He is signed to Universal Music France.

== Career ==
Axel Tony was born to a Cameroonian father and a Martiniquais-born mother (of Vietnamese descent) and grew up on a mix of African rhythms, zouk and R&B music. His father Tonye Jackson was a well-known singer in Cameroon and a choir director.

As an adolescent, he took part in the choir "We Are One" that included a number of known artists and appeared on a number of variety programmes on French television. In 2006, he joined as a backing vocalist for rapper Diam's on her European tour performing on around 50 venues in France, Belgium and Switzerland. Other gigs included backing vocals for rapper Kery James singing on James' "Lettre à mon public" as a single solo backing vocals in the refrains.

In 2009–2010, he branche to zouk collaborating with zouk artists Thayna and Imélie Monteiro, featured in their hit "Elle ou moi" written by Talina. Following the commercial success of the song, he toured in France and the Antilles and started working on a solo album project. Called Zouk et plus si affinité it is a mix of zouk, soul, R&B and gospel elements. Collaborations included Kayliah, Talina, Stony, and young artists Erika Azur and Jahmikal. The debut official single from the album "Les feux de l'amour" followed by "Pause Kizomba".

His greatest commercial success though came with "Avec Toi" that featured Tunisiano reaching No. 7 in SNEP French Singles Chart.

== Discography ==
=== Albums ===
Year	Album	Peak positions		Certification
Year	Album	FR	BEL (Wa)	Certification
2011	Zouk et plus si affinité	–	–	
2013	Je te ressemble	10	140	

=== Singles ===
Year	Single	Peak positions		Certification	Album
Year	Single	FR	BEL (Wa)	Certification	Album
2012	"Avec toi" (feat. Tunisiano)	7	3 (Ultratip)		Je te ressemble
2012	"Ma reine" (feat. Admiral T)	36	21 (Ultratip)		Je te ressemble
2013	"Au-delà des mots" (feat. Dry)	40	3 (Ultratip)		Je te ressemble
2014	"Ne me quitte pas"	126	–		
2017	"Si seulement si" (DJ Kayz feat. OMI)	–	–		

Other singles

- 2011: "Les feux de l'amour"
- 2011: "Pause Kizomba"
- 2013: "Sensualité" (with Sheryfa Luna)
- 2016: "Je t'aimais, je t'aime, je t'aimerai"

Featured in

Year	Single	Peak positions	Album
Year	Single	FR	Album
2013	"Flamme" (Tropical Family) (feat. Axel Tony, Layanah)	118	From cover album Tropical Family
2015	"Validé" (feat. Ridsa & Axel Tony)	12	
