= Admiral T =

French singer of reggae-dancehall music (born 1981)

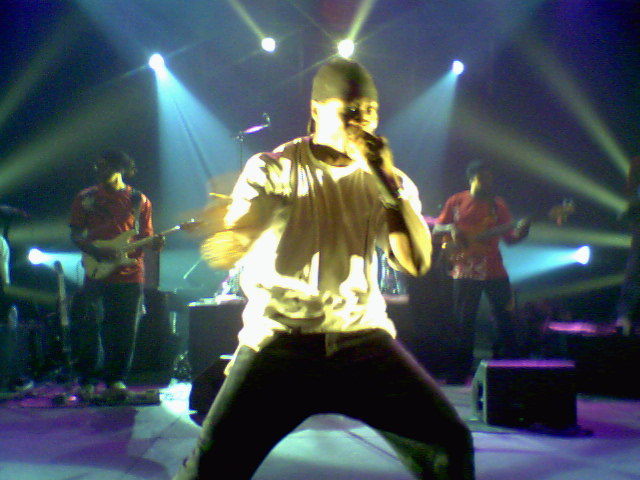
- Concert of Admiral T in Paris

Background information
- Also known as: Admiral T
- Born: Christy Campbell; 29 March 1981 (age 45); Les Abymes, Guadeloupe, French West Indies
- Origin: France (Guadeloupe)
- Genres: Reggae; dancehall; pop rap
- Occupations: Singer; rapper; songwriter; DJ; actor; fashion designer; record producer
- Years active: 1993–present
- Labels: Universal Music Group (AZ); Don S Music Entertainment; Mozaik Kreyol (MK)
- Formerly of: Karukera Sound System
- Website: Official site of Admiral T

Christy Campbell (born March 29, 1981), known by the stage name Admiral T, is a French singer, rapper, songwriter, DJ, and actor. He is one of the most popular and successful Guadeloupean singers. He is also a designer and the creator of the clothing trademark WOK LINE.

== Biography ==
Born in 1981 on the French island of Guadeloupe, he was one of ten children. He also has roots in the nearby island of Dominica. At the age of 6, he joined the dancehall group Karukera Sound System; he left the group in 1992 to start a solo career; releasing his first album Mozaïk Kréyòl. During the sneak preview of Sean Paul at Bercy Stadium in 2004, Admiral T outperformed himself and drew much attention. Universal Music Group's delegates who attended this concert decided to sign Admiral T and re-released his album on Universal Records, featuring artists like Wyclef Jean or French rapper Rohff. Admiral T's album became a hit throughout the West Indies, France and Europe.

In 2005, Admiral T starred in Guadeloupean director Jean-Claude Barny's film Nèg Maron. The following year, he released his second album, Toucher L'Horizon, which also gained popular and commercial success and got awarded a Césaire of Music Award in October 2006. Admiral T spent much of 2007 in France, London and the Caribbean on his "Fòs A Péyi La" Tour (from his title song duet with Kassav'). Admiral T also won a Skyrock Music Award in December 2007 and a Virgin music Award in February 2008. He launched his own clothing line WOK LINE and made a new tour in Africa during 2008. The following year, Admiral T performed in Germany at Summerjam, Europe's biggest reggae festival and at Dominica's World Creole Music Festival. On 19 April 2010, he released his 3rd album : Instinct Admiral, comprising featurings of Machel Montano, Busy Signal, La Fouine, Médine, Young Chang MC, Lieutenant, Patrick Saint-Éloi, Fanny J and Awa Imani. Besides his solo career, Admiral T is also the producer of the newcomer reggae-dancehall singer Wyckyd J.

In 2014, he sang On n'oublie pas (written by Serge Bilé) with several artists and personalities including Alpha Blondy, Jocelyne Béroard and Harry Roselmack. This song is a tribute to the 152 victims Martinique of the crash of 16 August 2005, to remember this event and to help the AVCA, the association of the victims of the air disaster, to raise funds.

== Personal life ==
Campbell has been married to his wife and manager Jessica since 2005. They have 3 children: twins Dylan and Lewis and daughter Chelsy. They met at age 20 and wed 4 years later. They have launched a streetwear clothing line.

== Nèg Maron ==
In the 2005 film, Admiral T plays one of two Guadeloupean residents of an urban slum who survive off of illicit activities.

== Discography ==
=== Albums ===
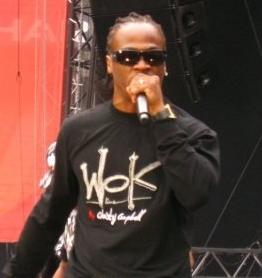
Admiral T in Stade de France

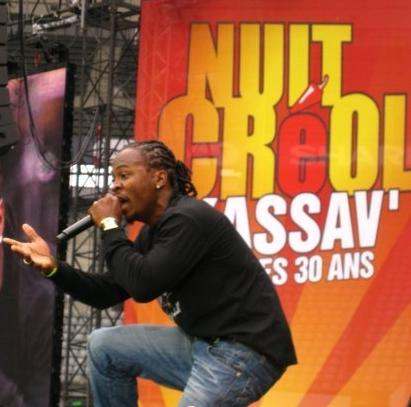
Admiral T Nuit Créole

Year	Album	Peak chart positions
Year	Album	FRA
2003	Mosaik Kreyol	30
2006	Toucher l'horizon	9
2010	Instinct Admiral	15
2012	Face B	36
2014	I Am Christy Campbell	81
2019	Caribbean Monster	196

=== Singles ===
Year	Single	Peak chart positions		Album
Year	Single	FRA	SWI	Album
2002	"Gwadada"	-	-	
2004	"Dancehall X-Plosion" (feat. Pearl)	56	-	
2006	"Les mains en l'air" (feat. Diam's)	29	76	
2007	"Fos a péyi la" (feat. Kassav')	-	-	
2010	"Viser la victoire" (feat. La Fouine and Médine)	-	-	

Featured in

Year	Single	Peak chart positions	Album
Year	Single	FRA	Album
2012	"Ma reine" (Axel Tony feat. Admiral T)	76	
2012	"Meet me" (NUZ feat. Admiral T)		

=== Mixtapes ===
- Mek It Happen (2002)
- Killa Session (2002)
- Ti Moun Ghetto (2004)
- Determiné Dèpi Piti (2005)
- Flagada Smokey (2006)
- Dancehall Festival (2006)
- Good To Mixx vol.2 (2006)
- The Big Champion (2006)
- Reyel Champion Soti Gwada (2007)
- Ti Moun Ghetto 2 (2007)
- The King of the Dancefloor (2007)

=== Compilations ===
- Ragga Kolor (2002)
- Dancehall Clash (2002)
- Ragga Dancehall N°1 (2003)
- Groovin Attitude (2004)
- Ragga Masters (2004)
- Génération Rap RnB vol. 2 (2004)
- Exclusif Admiral T (2005)
- Ninety Seven K-Ribbean (2005)
- Unis-Sons (2005)
- Reggae Bashement (2006)
- Total Reggaeton 2 (2006)
- Generation Dancehall (2007)
- Rap & R'n'B Non Stop (2007)
- Coupé Décalé Mania (2007)
- BexXx Cluzif (2008)
- Too Much Gangsta (2008)
- Good Times (2008)
- Mesrine (2008)
- Don's Collector Saison 3 (2008)
- Soprano Riddim (2008) (produced by Bost & Bim)

=== Contributions ===
- 1848 of Karukera Sound System (1998)
- Special Request of Karukera Sound System (2000)
- Welcome to Haiti of Wyclef Jean (2004)
- La Fierté Des Notres of Rohff (2004)
- Caribbean Sessions of Karukera Sound System (2005)
- Ma vision of Saël (2005)
- Émancipé of Vibe (2005)
- Dans Tes Rêves of Disiz La Peste (2005)
- Ah Shwe Bah of Dr. Lefty (2005)
- Soné Ka-La of Jacques Schwarz-Bart (2006)
- Face A La Réalité of Saik (2007)
- Les Liens Sacrés of Nèg'Marrons (2008)
- In Transit of Ziggi (2008)

== Filmography ==
=== Films ===
- Nèg Maron of Jean-Claude Flamand Barny (2005)
- Le Mur du Silence of Jean-Claude Flamand Barny (2009)
- Retour au pays of Julien Dalle (2010)

=== Concerts ===
- Le Grand Méchant Zouk (2006)
- Fos a Péyi La Tour (2007)

=== Reportages ===
- Mozaïk Kréyòl (2004)
- Toucher L'Horizon (2006)
- Dancehall Story (2008)

=== Clips ===
- Rapide (1998)
- Pas Comme Les Autres, featuring Saël (2000)
- Rendez-Vous, featuring Curtis (2000)
- Youth Attack, featuring Curtis (2001)
- So Strong, Savage Riddim (2002)
- Otantik, Hum Riddim (2002)
- Le Bien Et Le Mal, featuring Tiwony & Curtis (2002)
- Gwadada (2002)
- Lov', featuring Little Espion (2003)
- Rèv An Mwen (2003)
- Move Together, featuring Square One (2003)
- Dancehall X-Plosion, featuring Pearl (2004)
- Ok, featuring Saik (2004)
- Mets Nous A L'Aise, featuring Saël (2005)
- Lanmou Épi Respè (2006)
- Fos A Péyi La, featuring Kassav' (2006)
- Les Mains En L'Air, featuring Diam's (2006)
- Ti Moun Ghetto (2007)
- Pé La, featuring Jacques Schwarz-Bart (2008)

== See also ==
- D.Daly
