= Avec toi =

Single by Axel Tony
- Released: 2012
- Recorded: 2012
- Genre: Pop, R&B
- Label: Universal Music France
- Songwriters: Bachir Baccour, Pascal Boniani Koeu, Adila Sedraia, Axel Tony

Music video
- "Avec toi" on YouTube

"Avec toi" is a song by French singer Axel Tony and his first charting success in the SNEP French Singles Chart. The single was released on Universal Music France reaching #07 in the French charts.

== Alternative version featuring Tunisiano ==
An alternative version featuring Tunisiano became popular after releasing the music video for the single. The video in a dominant white setting tells the story of a love affair gone sour and the singer Axel Tony reminiscing his love while Tunisiano is raps some consoling remarks.

== Charts ==
| Chart (2012) | Peak position |
|---|---|
| Belgium (Ultratip Bubbling Under Wallonia) | 3 |
| SNEP French Singles Chart | 7 |
