= Kassav' =

Guadeloupean band

- Origin: Guadeloupe, France
- Genres: Zouk; cadence-lypso; kadans/compas
- Years active: 1979–present
- Labels: GD Productions/Sonodisc; Epic; CBS; Warner France
- Members: Jocelyne Béroard; Jean-Philippe Marthély; Jean-Claude Naimro; Georges Décimus
- Past members: Patrick St-Eloi; Pierre Edouard Décimus; Claude Vamur; Jacob Desvarieux
- Website: kassav-official.com

Kassav', also alternatively spelled Kassav, is a French Caribbean band that originated from Guadeloupe in 1979. The band's musical style is rooted in the Guadeloupean gwoka rhythm, as well as the Martinican tibwa and Mendé rhythms. Regarded as one of the most influential bands in 20th-century French West Indies music, Kassav is often credited with pioneering the zouk musical genre. Their musical evolution is a synthesis of cadence-lypso and compas traditions.

Despite initial resistance from French record labels, which disparaged their early works as excessively "too ethnic," Kassav' tenaciously persevered, collaborating with various West Indian music producers and distributing their music through Sonodisc. The term "kassav" in creole denotes a type of cassava pancake. The band's inception can be traced to Pierre-Edouard Décimus and Fréddy Marshall, members of the Guadeloupean ensemble Les Vikings, who aspired to innovate the island's traditional music by amalgamating it with contemporary influences.

The integration of Georges Décimus, brother of Pierre-Edouard Décimus, and Jacob Desvarieux, a guitarist and arranger, significantly contributed to the band's gradual formation, with additional musicians subsequently joining Kassav'. Their debut studio album, Love and Kadance, released in 1979, heralded the advent of zouk and served as the archetypical exemplar for the genre.

With a discography of over 50 albums, encompassing both band and solo projects from its members, Kassav' has achieved significant international recognition. They were the first black group to perform in the Soviet Union.

== History ==
Kassav' was formed in 1979 by Pierre-Edouard Décimus (former musicians from the Les Vikings de Guadeloupe) and Paris studio musician Jacob Desvarieux. Together and under the influence of well-known Dominican, Haitian and Guadeloupean kadans or compas bands like Experience 7, Grammacks, Exile One, Les Aiglons, Tabou Combo, Les Freres Dejean, etc., they decided to make Guadeloupean carnival music recording it in a more fully orchestrated yet modern and polished style. The name of the band is Antillean Creole for a local dish made from cassava root.

Kassav' is the creator of the fast carnival zouk Beton style. The French Antilles' Kassav' was the first to apply the MIDI technology to cadence and fused the genre with funk, and Makossa.

Music of Guadeloupe and Martinique:

- The gwo ka, traditional music of Guadeloupe, of which there are 7 versions (rhythmic)
- The bélé, traditional music from Martinique, of which there are 11 variants (rhythmic)
- The biguine music of Martinique
- The chouval bwa, traditional music of Martinique associated with the city of Saint-Pierre
- The mazurka and quadrille, European music of the French Antilles
- The Compas, modern Haitian méringue popularized by Nemours Jean-Baptiste in 1955
- The cadence rampa (kadans), alike compas, a modern Haitian méringue popularized by Webert Sicot in the very early 1960s that spread to the Caribbean
- The cadence-lypso of Dominica cadence popularized by Exile One with Gordon Henderson and also interpreted by groups such as Grammacks with Jeff Joseph as a senior member. Experience 7 was a Guadeloupean cadence band formed in the mid-1970s, led by Guy Houllier and Yves Honore.

Most authors credit Décimus, his brother Georges, the band's bassist and Desvarieux as its inventors. Their first album was Love and Ka Dance (1980). The band gained popularity in their much-heralded live performances in the Parisian arena Zénith and toured widely. For a band ostensibly operating in a "narrowly focused" Caribbean dance-based new genre, their success and influence on other artists was remarkable, although they were most influenced by a veritable cornucopia of other styles as noted above.

Kassav' continued to gain popularity both as a group and by several members' solo recordings and eventually peaked in 1985 with Yélélé, which featured the international hit Zouk "la sé sèl médikaman nou ni" (meaning "Zouk is the only medicine we have" in French Antillean Creole). With this hit song, zouk rapidly became a widespread dance craze in Latin America and the Caribbean, and was popular in Europe, Africa, and Asia. Zouk performers became known for wildly theatrical concerts featuring special effects, stage spectacles and colorful costumes. One important contribution of Kassav' in concert was the appearance of featured dancers on stage with the band; these dancers were in many ways as much a part of the band as any musician. Kassav' has been noted by its acolytes and aficionados as a dance band par excellence.

They have appeared with Admiral T, a famous reggae dancehall singer, and many other popular artists. Singer-songwriter/keyboardist Jean-Claude Naimro also appeared with world beat artist Peter Gabriel. Lead vocalist Jocelyne Béroard has also had a number of successes both solo and as a guest with other artists, being the first woman artist in the Caribbean to win certain music awards; she continues to perform with Kassav' and as a solo artist.

Jocelyne Béroard's stunning "amateur" photography of natural scenes and people seen from her unique traveling-artist perspective's island-paradise visuals could be cited among their songs' inspirations. The band's songs with a "political" edge or insinuation are typically double-entendre in the African-American and calypsonian traditions well known in Caribbean dance music from which the music of Kassav' evolved.

Originally formed solely of Guadeloupean artists (Decimus, Desvarieux, St-Eloi), within a few years Kassav' also embraced band members of Martinican ancestry (Béroard, Naimro, Marthely); their music is mostly compas that delved deep into synthesized sounds after exploring many acoustic timbres, with rhythms based fundamentally in a gwo ka (French Caribbean folkloric drumming/chanting) context, especially in earlier recordings. It has been suggested that their success was largely outside of the large U.S. music market due to a nearly total absence of English lyrics; instead, they use a very localized version of Créole Français unique to Guadeloupe and Martinique, very distinct from European French or even Haitian French Kreyòl. Their choice of language however did not limit their artistic vision, and it remains carnival-like and eminently danceable; the success of Kassav' was ongoing in the 2010s.

On 30 July 2021, Jacob Desvarieux, 65, died at the University Hospital of Abymes in Guadeloupe. He had been medically induced into a coma for almost a month. His death was attributed to COVID-19 by media reports.

== Musicians ==
=== Current ===
- Vocals: Jean Philippe Marthely (1981–present), Jocelyne Beroard (1980–present)
- Keyboards: Philippe Joseph (1994–present), Jean Claude Naimro (1980–present)
- Drums: Thomas Bellon (2012–present)
- Saxophones: Claude Pironneau (1999–present)
- Bass: Georges Decimus (1979–present)
- Trumpets:
  - Fabrice Adam (1994–present)
- Trombone: Hamid Belhocine (1982–present)
- Backing vocals: Marie-Céline Chroné et Marie-Josée Gibon

=== Past ===
- Drums: Claude Vamur (temporarily replaced by Hervé Laval, although Vamur did not leave the group)
- Percussion: Patrick Saint-Elie
- Percussion: César Durcin (died 11 February 2016)
- Saxophones: Claude Thirifays
- Trumpets: Jean-Pierre Ramirez, Freddy Hovsepian (1982–2021) (died 12 February 2021)
- Trombone: Claude Romano, Pierre Chabrèle
- Backing vocals: Catherine Laupa
- Keyboards: Douglas M Bida
- Bass: Frédéric Caracas, Pierre Edouard Decimus, Guy n Sangué et Stéphane Castry
- Vocals: Patrick Saint Eloi 1982 - 2002 (died 18 September 2010)
- Vocals: Jacob Desvarieux 1979 – 2021 (died 30 July 2021)

=== Guests ===
- Vocals: Zouk Machine, Jean Luc Guanel, Princess Lover, Tanya Saint Val, Shoubou, Philippe Lavil, Daly, Passi, Tony Chasseur, Jocelyne Labylle, Tribal Jam, Edith Lefel, (died 20 January 2003), Ralph Thamar.
- Backing Vocals: Claudine Pennont, Suzy Trébeau, Sylvie Aïoun, Jean-Jacques Seba
- Drums: Jean-Philippe Fanfant, José Zébina, Jérome Castry
- Percussion: Dédé Saint Prix, Albert Vigne
- Keyboards: Ronald Tulle, Thierry Vaton, Didier Davidas
- Guitars: Thierry Delannay, Ryco Loza (died 24 February 2022), Jean Christophe Maillard
- Saxophones: Allen Hoist, Alain Hatot (died 16 December 2020), Bruno Ribeira

== Discography ==
=== Albums ===
Studio albums

- 1979 Love and kadance
- 1980 Lagué mwen
- 1981 Kassav n°3
- 1982 George Décimus with Kassav' (joint album George Décimus / Kassav')
- 1983 Kassav
- 1983 Kassav n°5
- 1983 Passeport
- 1984 Ayé
- 1985 An-ba-chen'n la (2× Gold)
- 1987 Vini Pou (Gold and Platinum)
- 1989 Majestik Zouk (2× Gold)
- 1992 Tékit izi (2× Gold)
- 1995 Difé

Year	Album	Peak positions
Year	Album	FR
1996	Cho	43
2000	Nou la	41
2004	K Toz	31
2007	All U Need Is Zouk	58
2013	Sonjé	32

Live albums

- 1987 Kassav au Zenith
- 1990 Le Grand Méchant Zouk
- 1993 Live au Zénith
- 1996 Kassav cho
- 2005 Carnaval Tour 2005 (FR #124)
- 2006 Le Grand Méchant Zouk

Compilation albums

- 1987 Les Grand Succès de Kassav vol.1
- 1987 Les Grand Succès de Kassav vol.2
- 1998 Kassav Gold
- 1998 Un toque latino
- 1999 Le Meilleur de Kassav : Best of 20e anniversaire
- 2002 Les Indispensables de Kassav
- 2003 Légendes Kassav
- 2006 Best of
- 2006 Kassav: Les années sonodisc
- 2009 Saga (3 CD with 53 remastered numbers and 4 unedited) (FR #45)
- 2012 Le meilleur de Kassav' (FR #20)

=== Singles ===
(Selective, charting)

Year	single	Peak positions	Album
Year	single	FR	Album
1988	"Sye bwa"	19	
1988	"Solei"	40	
1989	"Sé dam bonjou"	45	
1990	"Wép wép"	44	
1990	"Ou lé"	43	

=== DVDs ===
- 1999 Les 20 ans de KASSAV à Bercy
- 2005 Carnaval tour
- 2006 Le grand méchant zouk
- 2008 All u need is zouk tour
- 2009 Nuit créole les 30 ans de KASSAV au Stade de France

== Discography (members) ==
Year	Album / EP	Credited to
1982	Oh Madiana EP	Jacob Desvarieux
1982	Misik Ce Lanmou	Patrick Saint-Éloi
1983	La Vie EP	George Décimus
1983	Banzawa	Jacob Desvarieux
1983	Ti Coq	Jean Philippe Marthély
1984	À la demande	Patrick Saint-Éloi
1984	Yélélé	Jacob Desvarieux & George Décimus
1985	Touloulou	Jean Philippe Marthély
1985	En Balatè	Jean-Claude Naimro
1985	Bizness	Jean Philippe Marthély & Patrick Saint-Éloi
1986	Gorée	Jacob Desvarieux & George Décimus
1986	Siwo	Jocelyne Béroard
1991	Milans	Jocelyne Béroard
1992	Bizouk	Patrick Saint-Éloi
1994	Zoukamine	Patrick Saint-Éloi
1996	Marthéloi	Jean Philippe Marthély & Patrick Saint-Éloi
1997	Digital dreads	Jean-Claude Naimro
1998	Lovtans	Patrick Saint-Éloi
1998	O péyi	Jean Philippe Marthély
1999	Euphrasine Blues	Jacob Desvarieux
1999	A l'Olympia	Patrick Saint-Éloi
1999	Délikatès	Jean-Claude Naimro
2002	Live en Martinique	Jean Philippe Marthély
2002	Swing Karaib	Patrick Saint-Éloi
2003	Madousinay	Jocelyne Béroard
2006	Koulè lanmou	Jean Philippe Marthély
2008	Kolo ka	Claude Vamur

Joint with others

- 2006 Partie pour zouker (Lorie & Jacob Desvarieux)
- 2007 Fòs a péyi la (Admiral T, Jacob Desvarieux & Jocelyne Beroard)
