= Majestik Zouk =

Studio album by Kassav'
- Released: September 20, 1989
- Genre: Zouk
- Length: 39:47
- Label: Columbia/CBS
- Producer: Jacob Desvarieux

Kassav' chronology
Au Zenith (1987)	Majestik Zouk (1989)	Tékit Izi (1993)

Majestik Zouk is an album by the French Caribbean music group Kassav'. It was released in 1989 by Columbia Records in the United States, and internationally by CBS Records International.

== Critical reception ==
Professional ratings
Review scores
Source	Rating
AllMusic	3/5 stars
Robert Christgau	B
The Rolling Stone Album Guide	3/5 stars

The New York Times wrote that "the accompaniment flits from calypso on synthesizers to abbreviated horn riffs over a tangle of African percussion." The Washington Post wrote that "the grooves are established by the locked-together, pause-and-push rhythms of guitarist Jacob Desvarieux and bassist Georges Decimus." The Gazette opined that "if you can get past the programmed drums, you'll be thrilled by the rhythms, uplifted by the brass ... and charmed by the classy singing."

== Track listing ==
1. "'Se Dam' Bonjou (Good Morning Ladies and Gentlemen)"
2. "Djoni (Johnny)"
3. "Wép (Hey)"
4. "Raché Tche (Sorrow)"
5. "Ou Lé (Would You Like)"
6. "Dézodiè (Unstable)"
7. "Konkibin (Concubine)"
8. "Doméyis (Domeus)"
9. "An Mwé (Help!)"
10. "Apré Zouk La (After Zouk)"
