= Slaï =

French singer

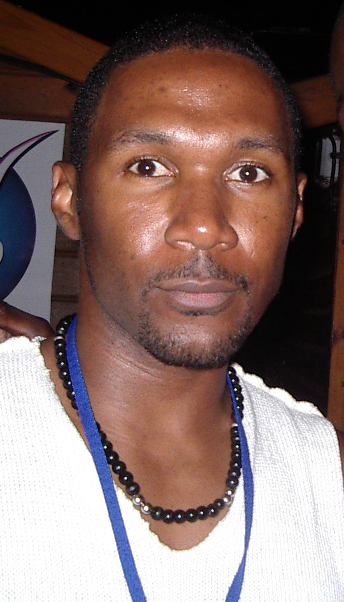

Background information
- Born: Patrice Sylvestre; 10 February 1973 (age 53); Val-d'Oise France
- Genres: Caribbean music, Tropical
- Years active: 1998–present

Patrice Sylvestre (born 10 February 1973), better known by his stage name Slaï, is a French singer of Guadeloupe origin.

Sylvestre, born in metropolitan France, spent his childhood and adolescence in Guadeloupe until 1996, when he returned to metropolitan France. Interested in music early on, he released "Flamme" in 1998, which became a huge success in the Caribbean region and earned him a great following. He released his debut album Fresh in 1998 and the follow-up album, the self-titled Slaï in 2002 in local Caribbean markets. The releases were also known in Caribbean immigrant circles in France.

In 2000, Slaï was recognized for his success with two awards during the Tropical Music Awards. First was "Best Selling Song" for "Flamme" (accredited by Zouk Fnac) and second "Revelation of the Year (masculine)" for 2000.

Slaï's fame crossed over to French mainstream as radio stations picked up on his repertoire of tropical songs as the genre gained more popularity in France and the genre being used in many mainstream French songs. As a result, Slaï decided to release his "Flamme" after many years of its original release in France, the single reaching number 4 on SNEP, the official French Singles Chart. Coinciding with the belated single, and with increased interest in tropical sounds, was his second album Florilège that reached 14 in the French albums and was certified double gold. Follow-up singles included "La dernière danse (ne rentre pas chez toi ce soir)" reaching number 9. In 2008, Slaï released Caraïbes that cracked the Top 10 in France.

== In popular culture ==
In the French 2013 tribute album dedicated to tropical sounds that had been popular with the French public, the collective chose to include Slaï's famous hit "Flamme" as one of the definitive tropical songs of the period. It was included in the repertoire of songs on the 12-track album Tropical Family. "Flamme" was interpreted by Axel Tony and Layanah on the album.

Slaï himself took part however in two other tribute tracks on the same album. They are "Les Poèmes de Michelle", a Teri Moïse song which Slaï did in solo. On a second track, the song "Il jouait du piano debout" from France Gall, Slaï performed it as a duo with Mélissa Nkonda.

== Discography ==
=== Albums ===
Year	Album	Peak positions		Certification
Year	Album	FR	BEL (Wa)	Certification
1998	Fresh	–	–	
2002	Slaï	–	–	
2004	Florilège	14	60	FR: 2× Gold
2008	Caraïbes	9	–	
2011	Escale	43		

=== Singles ===
Year	Single	Peak positions			Albums	Notes
Year	Single	FR	BEL (Wa)	SWI	Albums	Notes
2004	"Flamme"	4	9	41	Florilège	Originally released outside France in 1999
2004	"La dernière danse (ne rentre pas chez toi ce soir)"	9	14	49	Florilège	Originally released outside France in 2002
2005	"Après la tempête (jusq'au bout)"	18	–	–	Florilège	
2008	"Leçons particulières"	–	–	–	Caraïbes	
2011	"Autour de toi"	55	–	–	Escale	
2012	"Ça ne te convient pas"	–	–	–	Escale	
