= Papi Sánchez =

Background information
- Born: Robert de León Sánchez; 18 September 1975 (age 51); Santo Domingo, Dominican Republic
- Genres: Merengue, hip-hop
- Occupations: Singer, rapper
- Instrument: Vocals
- Years active: 2003–present

Robert de León "Papi" Sánchez (born 18 September 1975) is a Dominican merengue singer and rapper. Initially, beginning his career as a Hip Hop MC, radio host and music director, considered as an important member of the early stage of the Dominican Hip Hop movement, Eventually found major success bleeding Rap, R&B and merengue music in mid-2000s.

Initially, Sanchez began his career as part of the Hip Hop group MC Connection on the first stages of the Underground Dominican Hip Hop Movement of late 1980s and early 1990s. Later, he started to work as Radio Host with great success and eventually becoming director of some popular radio stations in Santo Domingo. In 2002, Sanchez decided to start his solo career and recorded his first album.

In 2003, Sanchez released the international hit "Enamórame", which reached the top ten in francophone countries including France, Belgium, Rusia, Turkey and Holland selling over 600,000 over in Europe and was certified gold in Belgium and France. On the same year, he released his debut album "Yeah Baby" (2003) selling over 500,000 around the world. Eventually, he receive several nominations to mayor awards as Billboard Latin Music Awards as Tropic airplay track of the year and won Summer Hit Track in Belgium and Best New Artist at 2004 Soberano Awards.

The next year, he released a cover of Nelly's song, "Dilemma". In 2005, Sanchez released his second studio album Welcome to the Paradise (2005) along with the single "Mano Pa Arriba" which peaked at 10 of US Tropical Airplay. Sanchez won Best International Group at 2006 Soberano Awards. In 2007, he released an all merengue inspired album "Made in Dominican Republic" (2007) and the subsequent releases Invicto (2010), and Septimo Soltero (2015). As of 2016, Papi Sanchez had sold over 2 million records worldwide.

== Discography ==
=== Albums ===
Year	Album details	Peak position			Certifications (sales thresholds)
Year	Album details	BEL (WA)	BEL (FL)	FR	Certifications (sales thresholds)
2003	Yeah Baby!: Released: September 30, 2003; Format: CD	85	92	128	—
2005	Welcome to the Paradise: Released: November 22, 2005; Format: CD				
2007	Made in Dominican Republic: Released: November 13, 2007; Format: CD				
2008	El Rey de la Republic: Released: September 23, 2008				
2010	Invicto: Released: April 20, 2010				
2015	Séptimo Soltero: Released: August 7, 2015				
2017	Mi Reinado				

=== Singles ===
Year	Title	Peak position							Certifications (sales thresholds)	Album
Year	Title	AUT	BEL (FL)	BEL (WA)	FR	GER	NED	SWI	Certifications (sales thresholds)	Album
2004	"Enamórame"	50	6	2	2	56	25	12	BE: Gold; FR: Gold	Enamorame
2005	"Dilemma"	—	16	8	20	—	66	—		Enamorame
2005	"Suave Mami"	—	34	51*	—	—	—	—		Enamorame

*Did not appear in the official Belgian Ultratop 50 (Wallonia) charts, but rather in the bubbling under Ultratip charts reaching number 1. Fifty positions added to actual Ultratip position to arrive to a comparable Ultratop position.

Featured in

Year	Title	Peak position		Album
Year	Title	BE (WA)	FR	Album
2011	"Pop Pop Kaduro" (G-Nose & Nelinho feat. Papi Sánchez)	–	58	
2014	"Enamorame (Oui bébé)" (DJ Assad feat. Papi Sanchez & Luyanna – Tropical Family)	95*	–	

*Did not appear in the official Belgian Ultratop 50 (Wallonia) charts, but rather in the bubbling under Ultratip charts. Fifty positions added to actual Ultratip position to arrive to a comparable Ultratop position.
