= Experience 7 =

Guadeloupean kadans band

- Origin: Pointe-à-Pitre, Guadeloupe
- Genres: Kadans, Compas, World music
- Years active: 1976–2001
- Labels: Debs Music; Pastel Prod
- Members: Guy Houllier; Yves Honoré
- Website: http://www.myspace.com/experience7#

Experience 7 was a Guadeloupean kadans band formed in the mid-1970s, led by Guy Houllier and Yves Honore. However, unlike Kassav' or Malavoi, the small band produced most of its songs with Henry Debs in Guadeloupe.

== Biography ==
=== Career ===
The group was created in 1976 by Guy Houllier and Yves Honore added that the successes such as "LA OLA Mizik YE" and "PLAS BAY LI". It also represents the Romantic era marked by songs such as "Whilfried", "Vivre pour toi", "Isabelle" ... and other tunes with "Carmelina", "Lanmou sé on danjé". They made a song called Carnival (1983), an album of winning a success as it was unexpected. But with "Goudjoua" and Roro, that was the first hit to reach the national charts. As memorable as Hurricane Hugo, the song "Sois belle" becomes a hymn to the hope of the rebirth of Guadeloupe as they were ambassadors around the world. They have raised the flag of Guadeloupe in Europe, Suriname, Martinique, Guyane, Haiti, Réunion, French Polynesia, Seychelles, New Caledonia, throughout West Africa, Canada and the United States.

=== Musical style ===
Through the years, Experience 7 used various styles of Caribbean music from mid 1970 to very late 2000. Those songs have spanned genres as diverse as biguine, cadence-lypso, and kadans/compas.

=== Influences ===
The work done to bring the group Zouk Machine, the band leaders create and composed, to the highest steps of the charts internationally (including the famous title Maldon), made them somewhat let down the band.

=== Late career ===
With the pressure from their fans, drove them to reoffend after 1995, when Zouk Machine split. They realize that three zouk-love or compas albums on which emerge from songs like "Pou Vou" (1996), "Sirena" (1997), "Extreme tendresse" (1998).

The 21st century saw the creation of Guy Houllier solo album called "Tendans" that took three SACEM prizes, rewarding the 25-year career of the Guadeloupean "crooner" in 2001.

== Discography ==
- 1976 : Experimental Whilfried
- 1977 : Vivre pour toi
- 1978 : Osibisa
- 1978 : Isabelle
- 1979 : Adieu Carmélina
- 1980 : Banzaï
- 1981 : Siw Bizwen Milyon
- 1983 : Je reviendrais
- 1984 : Tendrement vôtre
- 1985 : Diva
- 1985 : Roro
- 1987 : Goudjoua
- 1990 : Sois belle
- 1996 : Zouk N'Love
- 1997 : Sirena
- 1998 : Extreme tendresse
- 2001 : Tendans (Album solo) Guy Houllier
- 2008 : Mistè lanmou
