= Patrick Saint-Éloi =

French musician (1958–2010)

- Born: 20 October 1958; Pointe-à-Pitre, Guadeloupe France
- Died: 18 September 2010 (aged 51) Le Moule, Guadeloupe France
- Genres: Compas
- Occupation: Musician
- Instruments: guitar; drums; percussion; bass guitar
- Years active: 1975–2010

Patrick Saint-Éloi (20 October 1958 – 18 September 2010) was a French musician. He was one of the lead singers of the Zouk and Compas band Kassav'. As a solo artist, he helped create zouk beton, a fast music genre played only by Kassav'. He was also an admired singer and songwriter of compa and Zouk Love songs. Saint-Éloi died of cancer in Pointe-à-Pitre in 2010, aged 51. A public tribute was organised in Moule before his burial.

== Discography ==
=== Studio albums ===
- Misik Ce Lan-Mou (1982, 2M Production)
- A La Demande (1984, GD Productions)
- Jean-Philippe Marthely / Patrick Saint-Eloi (1985, GD Productions)
- Bizouk (1992, Sonodisc)
- Zoukamine (1994, Sonodisc)
- Martheloi (1996, Martheloi, with Jean-Philippe Marthely)
- Lovtans' (1998, P.S.E. Productions)
- Swing Karaib (2002, P.S.E. Productions, Lusafrica)
- Plézi (2005, P.S.E. Productions)

=== Live albums ===
- Live à l'Olympia (2010, P.S.E. Productions, Note A Bene)

=== Compilations ===
- Zoukolexion Vol.1 (2007, Note A Bene)
- Zoukolexion Vol.2 (2008, Note A Bene)

=== Selected tribute albums and posthumous releases ===
- Passion Saint-Eloi (2016, Note A Bene, tribute album)
