= Philippe Lavil =

French singer (born 1947)

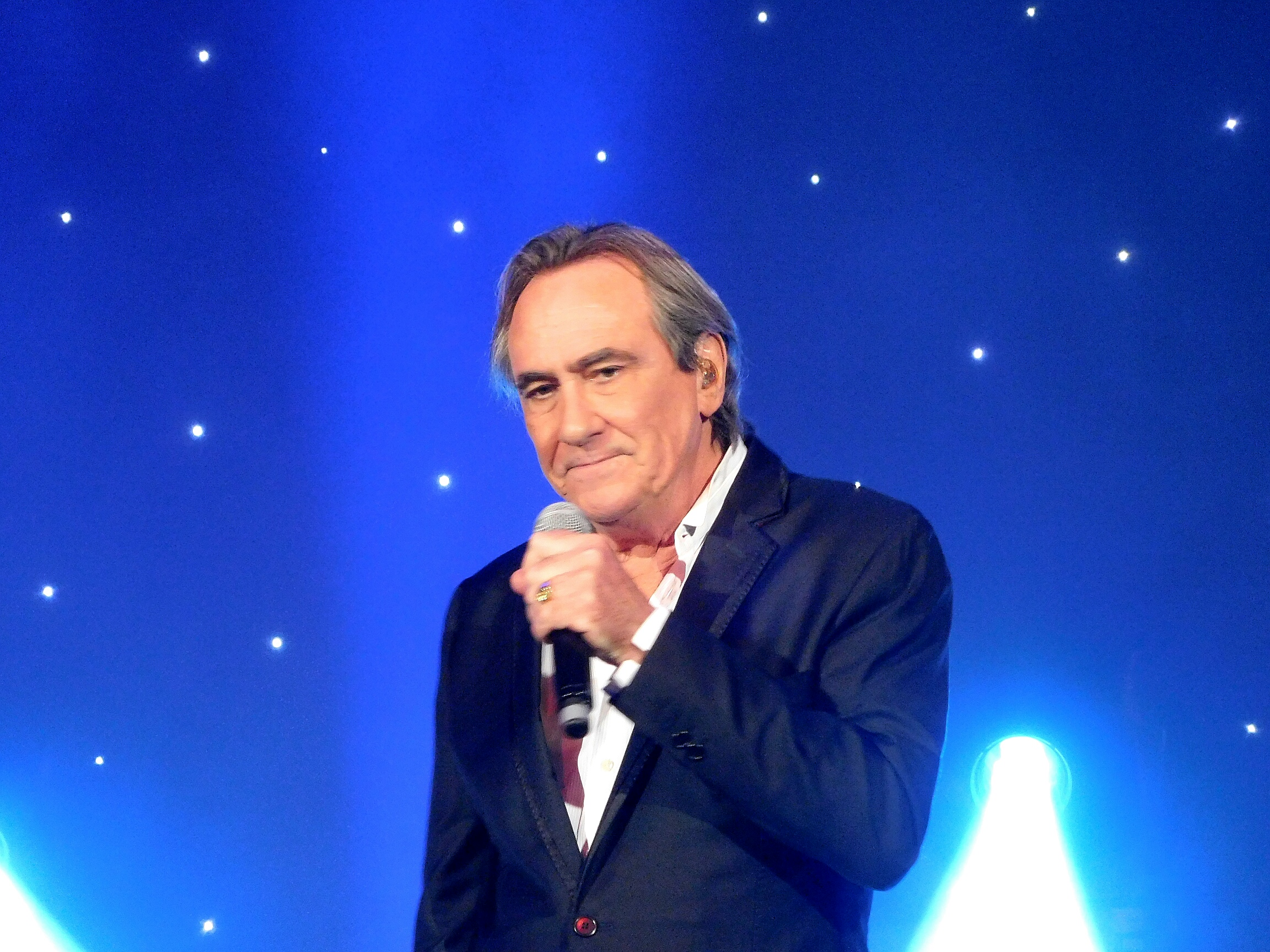

Background information
- Born: Philippe Durand de La Villejégu du Fresnay; 26 September 1947 (age 78)
- Origin: Fort-de-France, Martinique
- Genres: Pop
- Occupation: Singer
- Years active: 1969–present
- Formerly of: Les Enfoirés
- Website: www.philippelavil.com/

Philippe Lavil (born 26 September 1947), pseudonym of Philippe Durand de La Villejégu du Fresnay, is a French singer. He remained particularly famous for his hits singles "Il tape sur des bambous", "Elle préfère l'amour en mer" (number 8 in France) and "Kolé séré", a duet with Jocelyne Béroard (number 4 in France). Lavil was also member of Les Enfoirés in 1996, 1997 and 1998.

== Discography ==
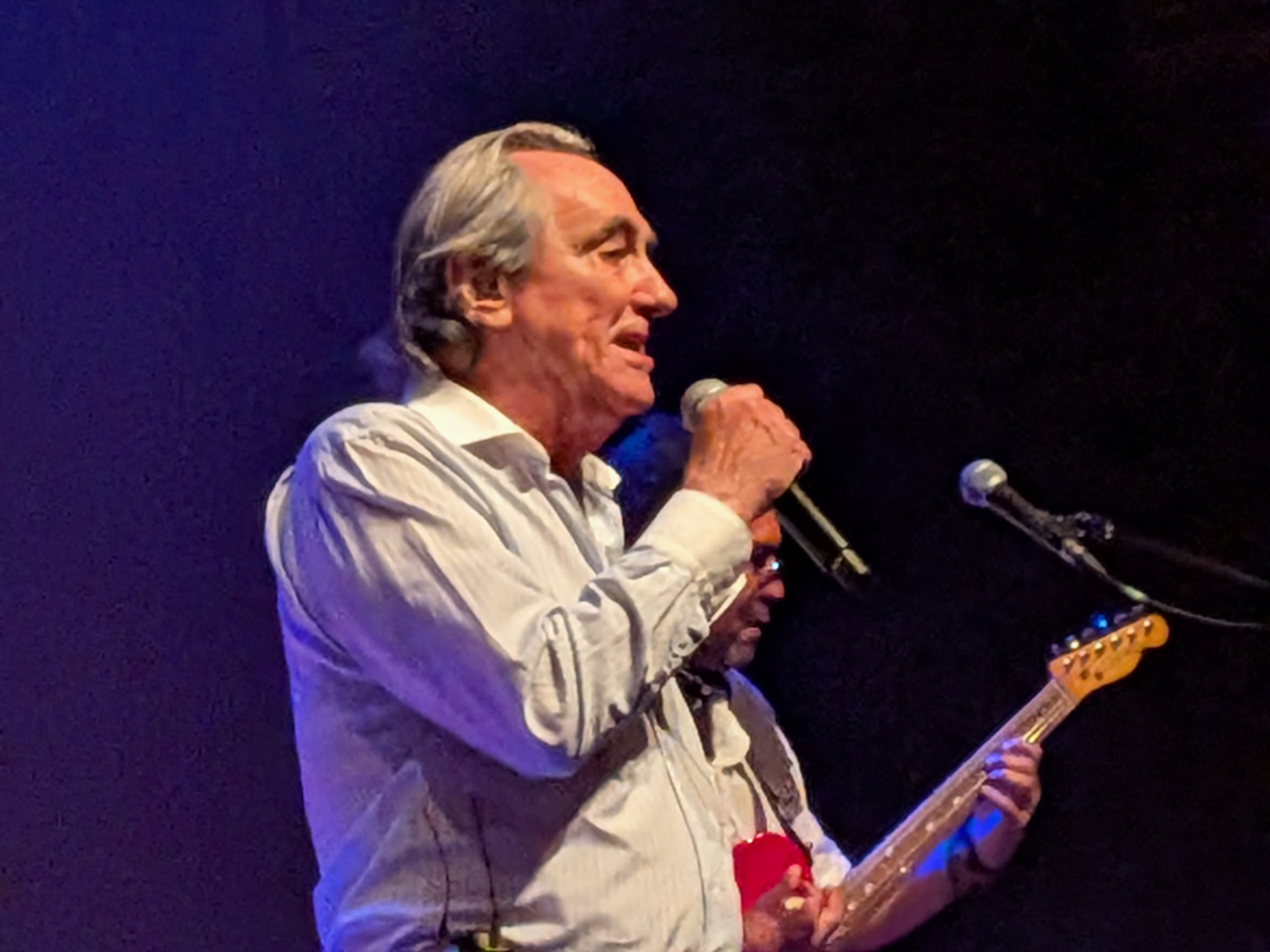
Lavil on stage in Paris on 29 May 2026.

=== Albums ===
- 1989: Nonchalances
- 1992: Y a plus d'hiver
- 1994: Déménage
- 1996: Un zest of
- 1997: Ailleurs, c'est toujours l'idéal
- 2002: Retour à la case créole – #56 in France
- 2007: Calypso – #75 in France

=== Singles ===
- 1970: "Avec les filles je ne sais pas"
- 1971: "Nanas et Nanas"
- 1971: "Un poquito d'amor"
- 1971: "Plus j'en ai, plus j'en veux"
- 1976: "Heure locale"
- 1982: "Il tape sur des bambous"
- 1984: "Jamaicaine"
- 1985: "Elle préfère l'amour en mer" – #8 in France
- 1988: "Kolé séré" – #4 in France
- 1989: "La Chica de Cuba"
- 1991: "De Bretagne ou d'ailleurs" – #29 in France
- 1994: "Jules apprend"

== Filmography ==
- 2006: Laura (TV series)
- 2007: Bee Movie
- 2017: Nina (1 Episode)
