= Charles D. Lewis =

Barbadian musician

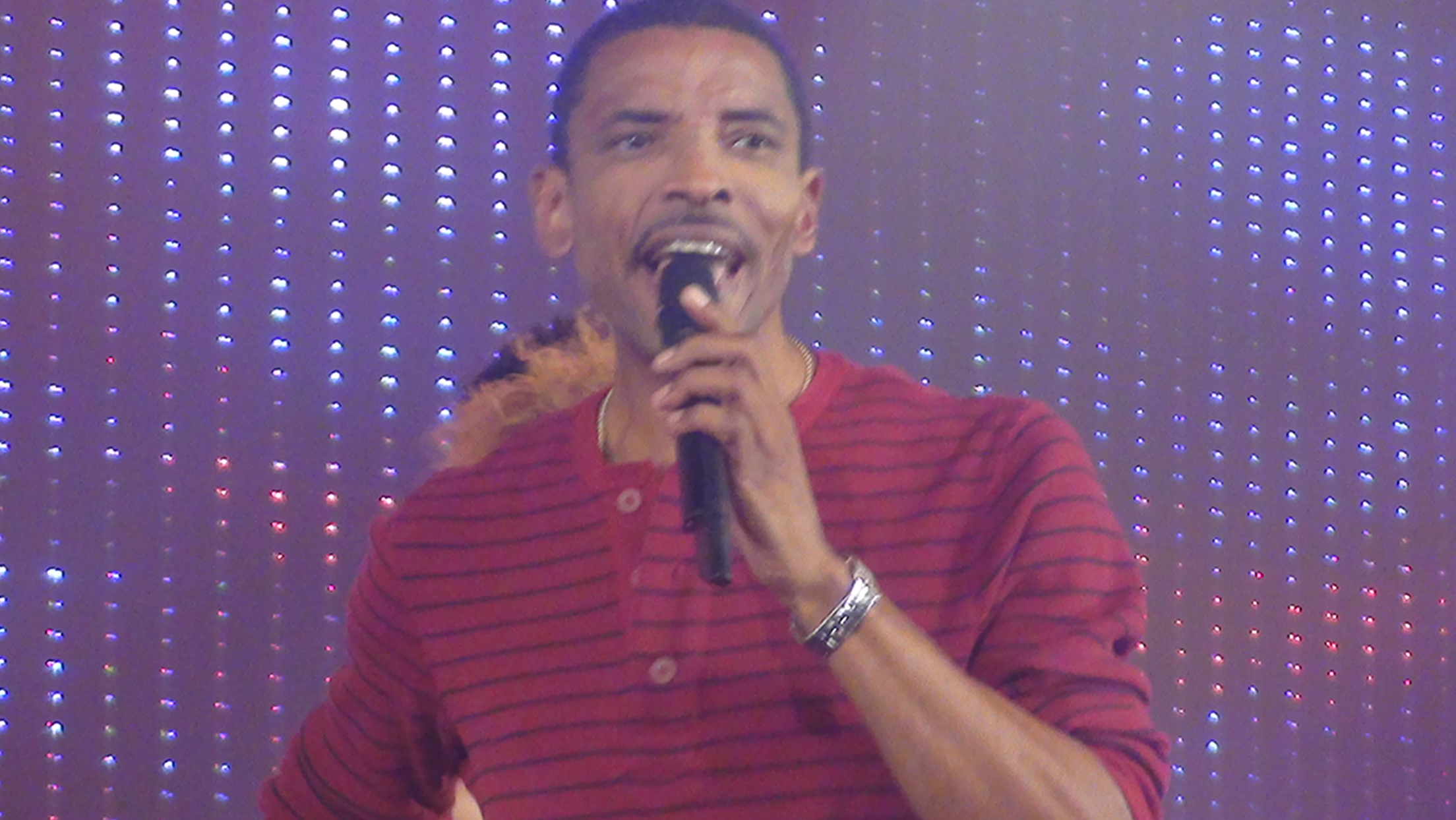
- Charles D. Lewis at a performance rehearsal in Paris, France

Background information
- Birth name: Charles Donavon Lewis
- Genres: Soca, Bajanbeat, Calypso, Caribpop
- Occupation(s): Musician, singer, producer
- Instrument(s): Vocals, bass, acoustic / electric guitar, piano
- Years active: 1976–present
- Labels: Carib Disc Records, Universal Music France, Universal Music Germany

Charles D. Lewis (born 1955) is a Barbadian songwriter, recording artist, bassist, engineer, and producer.

== Career ==
Charles is best known for his writing and performance of "Soca Dance", released in Europe in 1990. It was number one for seven weeks in France and Belgium, gaining gold status in both countries. The song entered the charts in 22 other countries including the top 10 in Germany, Switzerland and the Netherlands and sold over 3 million copies worldwide, eventually becoming the 25th highest selling single on the European Top 100 Singles Chart in 1990.

His album Do You Feel It also reached No. 1 in France and Belgium and was also awarded gold status and emerged as the 25th highest selling album on the European Top 100 Albums Chart in 1990. "Soca Dance" has subsequently been recorded around the world in many languages, by over 100 other artists including Latin singer Chayanne for Sony Music.

In November 1990, Lewis was granted The European Music & Media 'Diamond Award' and in February 1991 he received the Ampex Golden Reel Award. Successes followed one after the other with his BMG Ariola releases "Another Friday Night" and the Christmas-release "Life Is Beautiful" which he wrote for his two sons, Raphael and Jamal.

After completing a diploma in audio engineering at a college in Germany, Lewis returned to the Caribbean in his Barbados-based RaGaCha Studios. He has produced for several successful Caribbean artists including the Soca Ambassadors Square One. As a mastering engineer, Lewis's name appears on many albums, having given the final magic touch to many hit albums from some of the Caribbean's top artists including Square One, Krosfyah, Traffic, Boogsie Sharpe and Coalition, among others.

In January 2006, Lewis became the first recipient of the Barbados Music Awards' "Lifetime Achievement Award".

In 2007, Carib Disc Records released the compilation album All My Goodness which features a collection of hits from his Do You Feel It CD, along with several new and previously unreleased titles.

After a short break, Lewis returned to the live stage in summer 2014. Since then he has been performing for concerts and TV shows across Europe. Appearances on TV shows like Patrick Sabastien and M6's Top 50 have afforded him the pleasure of sharing the stage with some top international artists, including Seal, Morey Kante, the Weather Girls, Zouk Machine and Yannick Noah.

In January 2015, Lewis, along with fellow Barbados and St. Lucia stars Red Plastic Bag, Wayne "Poonka" Willock, Anderson "Blood" Armstrong, Lennon "Blaze" Prospere, Sherwin "Dupes" Brice and Nicholas Brancker were invited to Berlin, Germany, to participate in a week long cultural exchange project (workshop and concert), receiving high accolades from both critics and the general public.

Carib Disc Records released volume 2 of Lewis's popular songs, entitled More of My Goodness.
