= Dédé Saint Prix =

- Origin: Martinique
- Genres: Chouval bwa World music
- Years active: 1972-present
- Labels: L P K SOUND / ANBALARI Publishing

Dédé Saint Prix (born 10 February 1953) is a French singer from Martinique, performing traditional chouval bwa music. He has used elements of modern styles in his recordings, including tambour, hip hop music, charanga, ragga, son, zouk, kompa and rara. He has been performing for more than 38 years and has released at least 25 albums. He is also a composer and flautist. He taught music until 1991; since that time he has devoted his time to study and performance of Caribbean rhythmic traditions, with worldwide appearances.

In 2012, he was made a Chevalier de la Légion d’honneur.

== Albums ==
1988 Mi Sé Sa

2005 Fruits de la patience
