= Teri Moïse =

American singer (1970–2013)

- Born: Terry Moise; March 25, 1970; Los Angeles, California, US
- Died: May 7, 2013 (aged 43) Madrid, Spain
- Genres: Soul
- Occupation: Singer
- Instrument: Vocals

Terry Moise, known by her stage name Teri Moïse (March 25, 1970 – May 7, 2013) was an American singer.

Her parents emigrated from Haiti to South Central, Los Angeles. After high school she studied economics at the University of California, Berkeley. In 1990 she went to France, where she studied literature at the Sorbonne and worked as an au pair. After returning to the United States, she began studying at the Musicians Institute in Los Angeles.

In 1992, Moïse again moved to Paris and pursued a career in music working as a choir singer, bass player and songwriter. She eventually met Étienne Wersinger in Paris. They decided to record demos and Wersinger visited several music producers. Philippe Ascoli, director of the newly created “Source” label at Virgin France, when hearing the cassette, fell under the spell of Moïse.

French DJ Etienne De Crécy and Stéphane "Alf" Briat collaborated on her 1996 self-titled debut album, which sold 500,000 copies. The album and its two singles Les poèmes de Michelle (Michelle's Poems) and Je serai là (I'll Be There) were among the most influential French Soul releases of the 1990s.

Teri Moïse is the final winner of the Victoire de la musique in the category "Artiste interprète ou groupe francophone", receiving the award in 1997.

On behalf of her recording contract, her second album TERIMOÏSE was released in November 1998. The recording, according to Étienne de Crécy was difficult for Moïse. As a result, she felt more and more uncomfortable with fame and the lack of artistic freedom. In 2000, she decided to sue Virgin for unfair terms, as she did not want to record the third album mentioned in her employment contract. Although she won her lawsuit at the end of 2001, her partner at the time, Patrick Houlez, said that Moïse was disappointed that the press did not mention the fact that she had managed to stand up to the cynicism of the music industry.

At that precise moment, Moïse decided to disappear from the music scene and public life. She and Houlez moved to Barcelona, Spain, from 2000 to 2008. She went back to the US, as her mother fell ill. She stayed in Miami until her mother died in 2010. An avid reader, she studied many languages, and eventually settled in Berlin, Germany to learn the language.

Some time after her breakingup with Houlez, she planned to live in Spain again, and flew to Madrid in the spring of 2013.

She committed suicide in her hotel room in Madrid, Spain, on May 7, 2013.

== Discography ==
=== Albums ===
- 1996 : Teri Moïse – #13 in Belgium, #12 in France, #27 in Quebec
- 1999 : Teri Moïse – #54 in France

=== Singles ===
- 1996 : "Les Poèmes de Michelle" – #30 in Belgium, #11 in France, #3 in Quebec
- 1996 : "Je serai là" – #4 in Belgium, #8 in France, #49 in Quebec
- 1998 : "Fais semblant" – #28 in France
- 1999 : "Star" – #89 in France
