= Zouk Machine =

All-female zouk group from Guadeloupe

- Origin: Pointe-à-Pitre, Guadeloupe
- Genres: World beat Kadans; Cadence-lypso; Zouk
- Years active: 1986–1995
- Label: Debs Music
- Members: Dominique Zorobabel; Jane Fostin

Zouk Machine is an all-female zouk group from Guadeloupe which had several hits, particularly in France, such as the summer number-one single on French SNEP Singles Chart "Maldòn (la musique dans la peau)", in 1990 that sold over 1 million copies well more than any other Antillean band, even Kassav.

== History ==
Founded in 1986 by the members of Experience 7, Guy Houllier and Yves Honore, and composed by three Guadeloupians (Joëlle Ursull, Christiane Obydol, Dominique Zorobabel), the group became successful with their first album Sové Lanmou (composed by Guy Houllier and Yves Honoré, who are respectively Christiane Obydol's brother and brother-in-law). Joëlle Ursull left the group and embarked on a solo career, taking second place in the 1990 Eurovision with "White and Black Blues", composed by Serge Gainsbourg and Sylvain Augier.

In the early 1990s, Jane Fostin (from a large musical family in Guadeloupe) was recruited to continue ahead.

Therefore, the success of the group overstepped the Caribbean community and the song "Maldon' (la musique dans la peau)" remained number 1 in the Top 50 for nine weeks in 1990. This song gave birth to Industrial Zouk, a genre where machines inspired by the Intonarumori of Luigi Russolo are prominent. The group carried out some tours around the world, then recording albums Sa ké cho and Clin d'œil. Various members also participated in Maxime Le Forestier's album, Passer ma route, along with Julien Clerc and "Utile", plus the soundtrack of Asterix On vit ensemble et Au Revoir.

In 1995, the group had a crisis situation, and BMG released a first best of. Jane Fostin finally left the group to launch into a solo career. Her first solo single "La Taille de ton amour", cover of Deborah Cox's "Who do you love" was a success in France, where it peaked at #9, followed by 4 albums with R&B overtones, including a 2006 an album with the Zouk hit single 'Pas de Glace', a duet with Medhy Custos.

== Members ==
- Christiane Obydol (former)
- Jean-Marc Vivenza (former)
- Dominique Zorobabel (former)
- Joëlle Ursull (former)
- Jane Fostin

== Discography ==
=== Albums ===
Year	Album	France
1986	Sové Lanmou	—
1989	Maldòn	—
1991	Kréòl	24
1993	Clin d'œil	—
1993	Best Of Zouk Machine	20
1999	7 Nuits Blanches	—

=== Singles ===
- "Sové Lanmou" (1986)
- "Maldon' (la musique dans la peau)" (1990) - #1 in France
- "Ou ké rivé" (1991) - #28 in France
- "Sa ké cho" (1991) - #9 in France
- "DJ" (1992) - #31 in France

== References and links ==
- Elia Habib, Muz hit. tubes, p. 187 (ISBN 2-9518832-0-X)
- Zouk Machine, chronology Étoile-productions.be
