= Ti Manno =

Haitian musician

- Born: Emmanuel Jean-Baptiste; June 1, 1953; Gonaïves, Haiti
- Died: May 13, 1985 (aged 31) New York City
- Genres: Compas, kadans
- Occupations: Musician, songwriter, producer
- Instruments: Guitar, keyboards, vocals, percussions
- Years active: 1973–85
- Formerly of: Les Diables du Rythme, Les Formidables de Saint Marc, Volo Volo, Les Astros de New York, D.P. Express, Gemini All Stars

Ti Manno (June 1, 1953, in Gonaïves, Haiti – May 13, 1985, in New York) was a Haitian singer, guitar player, keyboard player, and percussionist.

== Biography ==
Antoine Rossini Jean-Baptiste, born Emmanuel Jean-Baptiste, and better known as Ti Manno, was one of, if not the most, beloved and well known Haitian singer. His lyrics were avant-garde, he sang about the condition of the Haitian people, sexism, sexual harassment, power harassment, discrimination.

Ti Manno started playing music with small bands before joining the group "Les Diables du rythme de Saint-Marc". In the 1970s he migrated to Boston and began playing with Ricot Mazarin for a band called Volo Volo de Boston, he left that band and later convinced by Arsene Appolon joined "Les Astros de New York".

In 1978 he was the lead singer for DP Express one of the biggest and most popular Haitian bands at the time. Ti Manno left DP Express in 1981 and formed his own group "Gemini All Stars" and this group released five albums altogether.

Sadly in late 1983 he became very sick in New York with Acquired immunodeficiency syndrome (AIDS). The Haitian community and music producers gathered together to raise money to try and save the superstar. "Operasyon men Kontre" set off and raised well over $15,000 toward Ti Manno's hospital care. On May 13, 1985 the legendary Antoine Rossini Jean Baptiste aka Ti Manno died in Mount Sinai Morningside(then St. Luke's-Roosevelt Hospital Center) .

On May 18, 1985, right after the death of Ti Manno, thousands of fans flooded the Eastern Parkway funeral hall in New York City where his viewing was held. Many artists, family members, media personalities and fans attended his viewing and funeral at St. Matthew's church Eastern Parkway, which was conducted by his brother who was a priest, to pay their respects. He is buried at Calvary Cemetery.

== Discography ==
With Les Diables du Rythme

- 1969: Les Diables Du Rythme

With Volo Volo

- 1975: Caressé
- 1979: La Nature

With Astros

- 1975: Up 2 Date Band
- 1976: Volume 2

With D.P. Express

- 1979: Volume 4
- 1979: David (the name is in reference of Hurricane David)

With Gemini All Stars

- 1981: Gemini All Stars de Ti Manno
- 1981: Exploitation Vol. 2
- 1982: Immoralité/An ba la caye
- 1982: Gemini All Stars de Ti Manno
- 1984: Gemini All Stars de Ti Manno
- 1985: Bamboche Créole
