= Food for the Poor =

Ecumenical Christian nonprofit organization

Food for the Poor, Inc.
- Founded: 1982
- Founder: Ferdinand Mahfood
- Type: Non-profit organization
- Purpose: Impoverished people throughout Latin America and the Caribbean
- Location: Coconut Creek, Florida, United States
- Region served: Seventeen countries throughout Latin America and the Caribbean
- Method: Direct assistance of churches and charity organizations operating within in-need areas through the delivery of food, medicine, housing, and other vital goods
- Key people: Ed Raine (President, CEO)
- Employees: 300+ (2020)
- Website: www.foodforthepoor.org

Food for the Poor, Inc. (FFP) is an ecumenical Christian nonprofit organization based in Coconut Creek, Florida, United States that provides food, medicine, and shelter, and other forms of aid in Latin America and the Caribbean.

Food for the Poor, Inc. is a 501(c)(3) corporation.

== History ==
In 1982, Ferdinand Mahfood (1937–2023), who was born in Kingston, Jamaica and immigrated with his family to the United States in 1972, founded Food for the Poor to aid the poor and downtrodden in Latin America and the Caribbean. Clergy members from Episcopalian, Lutheran and Catholic churches are involved in the organization's outreach in the United States about the need in the countries they serve.

Since 1982, Food for the Poor has distributed more than $12 billion worth of food, medicine, housing materials, water, and other aid to the poor of the Caribbean and Latin America. In 2007, the charity moved its headquarters from Deerfield Beach, Florida to Coconut Creek, Florida. As of 2020, Food for the Poor employed more than 300 people at its Coconut Creek location, in addition to employing members of the Clergy as speakers across the United States.

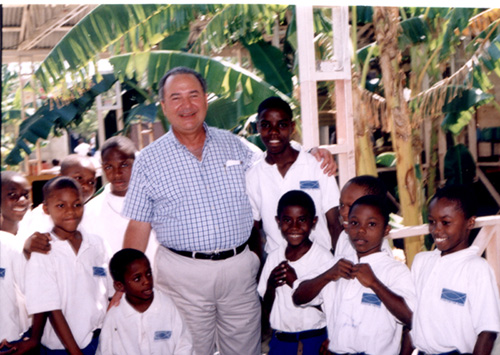
Robin Mahfood, former president and CEO of FFP from 2000 to 2020.

== Leadership ==
The President of Food for the Poor is Ed Raine. Raine joined Food for the Poor in October 2017 and was appointed Executive Vice President in May 2018, focusing on organizational development and strategy.

== Fundraising programs ==
Food for the Poor raises donations of money and supplies, mostly from donors in the United States. A majority of the organization's revenue is from donated goods.

Champions for the Poor is a personal fundraising program that was founded in 2009 that allows donors to create fundraising webpages to raise funds for the poor in the Caribbean and Latin America.

Angels of the Poor is a monthly giving program for which former Charlie's Angel actor Cheryl Ladd served as its spokesperson. Food For The Poor also hosts an annual Building Hope Gala in Boca Raton, Florida.

== Charity programs ==
Food For The Poor provides, as its main objective, nourishment to the poor. The organization also erects homes for homeless families, supplies medicine and health care in hospitals and clinics, subsidizes orphanages, and teaches children and adults by providing training.

=== Angels of Hope ===
Food For The Poor has a child sponsorship program that operates in many of the countries it serves in Latin America and the Caribbean. According to its website, over 7,200 orphaned or abandoned children are sponsored in the program.

=== Targeted crisis relief programs ===
In addition to its general community development and direct aid programs designed to reduce poverty and malnutrition, Food For The Poor provides targeted relief for humanitarian crises. On January 11, 2010, it announced initial success in introducing a new food source, the Basa fish, for the critically malnourished nation of Haiti.

On January 13, 2010, it announced a major relief effort directed toward the people of the same nation to help recover from the catastrophic January 12 earthquake which struck Port-au-Prince. Food For The Poor has built 16,204 housing units since the earthquake. Additionally, 44 schools were built or restored in the Port-au-Prince region.

Shortly after Hurricane Matthew hit Haiti on Oct. 3, 2016, the charity set a goal to build 1,000 housing units in 100 days. The charity's teams in Haiti were able to build 1,086 housing units in 114 days, and now are helping storm victims replant crops and rebuild livestock to offset growing food scarcity

== Partners ==
Food For The Poor partners with local organizations in the countries where they work. Jamaica, the first country assisted by Food For The Poor, today includes more than 1,800 churches as partners in the distribution of food, medicine, educational supplies, and other needed items.

Since 1989, the charity's street feeding program in Kingston, Jamaica has been operated in partnership with the Salvation Army.

Haiti, the largest recipient of aid from the charity, has an expansive network of island-wide distribution hubs and supports thousands of partners in feeding the poorest of the poor.

Some of our other major partners include: the American Nicaraguan Foundation, Caritas, CEPUDO, Fundación Nuevos Horizontes, Living Water, and Order of Malta.

== Controversies ==
As of March 2021, Charity Navigator gives Food for the Poor an Overall Score & Rating of 87.82.

On April 11, 2018, the attorney general for the state of California, Xavier Becerra, filed a limited cease-and-desist order against Food For The Poor, alleging that the charity's claim that 95.6% of all donations, including donated goods, went directly to programs that help the poor was misleading and that the actual number for 2013 was 66.2% of cash donations.

Food for the Poor responded that it upholds the highest standards of integrity and honesty and that it is confident that it will demonstrate that its accounting and valuation practices and solicitations meet and often exceed legal requirements, as well as industry best practices. It issued a public statement and is appealing the order.

On September 20, 2019, the California Attorney General's office announced that it had secured a Cease and Desist Order and over $1 million in penalties against MAP International, Food for the Poor, and CMMB (Catholic Medical Mission Board), for deceptive solicitation tactics.

== See also ==
- Feed the Children
- Food for the Hungry
