= Humanitarian response to Typhoon Haiyan =

Typhoon Haiyan
- Philippine citizens gather around a U.S. Navy MH-60S Seahawk helicopter assigned to Helicopter Sea Combat Squadron (HSC) 12 as it delivers relief supplies Nov. 17, 2013, during Operation Damayan in Guiuan
- Date: November 2013
- Deaths: 6,352 confirmed, 1,071 missing

In the wake of Typhoon Haiyan, the Philippines received numerous messages of condolence and offers of assistance from a range of international leaders.

== Supranational bodies ==
The United Nations said it was going to increase critical relief operations as a result of the devastation caused by the typhoon. Its Manila office issued a statement that read, "Access remains a key challenge as some areas are still cut off from relief operations. Unknown numbers of survivors do not have basic necessities such as food, water and medicines and remain inaccessible for relief operations, as roads, airports and bridges were destroyed or covered in wreckage." The United Nations also began relief operations by this time; however, the severe damage to infrastructure hampered efforts to distribute supplies. The UN activated the Cluster System, in which groups of humanitarian organizations (UN and non-UN) work to restore health, shelter, nutrition and economic activity.

The World Health Organization, which leads the Health Cluster, the largest one, has developed guidance on donations of medicine and healthcare equipment, so that the Philippines receives supplies appropriate for this emergency. According to WHO, many people suffered cuts, wounds, and broken bones during the disaster and others were injured in flooding that followed the typhoon. Interpol announced that they would send in Interpol officers from Lyon to help local law enforcement identify any of the corpses that are unidentified.

The World Health Organization has spearheaded initiatives among help workers, especially from the Department of Health (Philippines), in extending Psychological First Aid to people in typhoon-affected areas. WHO Representative in the country Dr Julie Hall foresees long-lasting effects from the typhoon. She calls for increased preparedness to give support to families and communities for the long-term, citing the need for more trained field workers.

The World Bank Group said it was providing almost US$1 billion to support Typhoon Haiyan reconstruction, including a US$500 million budget support loan and a US$480 million loan for early reconstruction through a national community-driven development project.

== Africa ==
South Africa gave humanitarian assistance through sending its delegation composing of medics and aid workers to calamity-affected areas. They also sent over some food and water to help. Algeria pledged $3 million worth of rice as relief goods.

== Americas ==
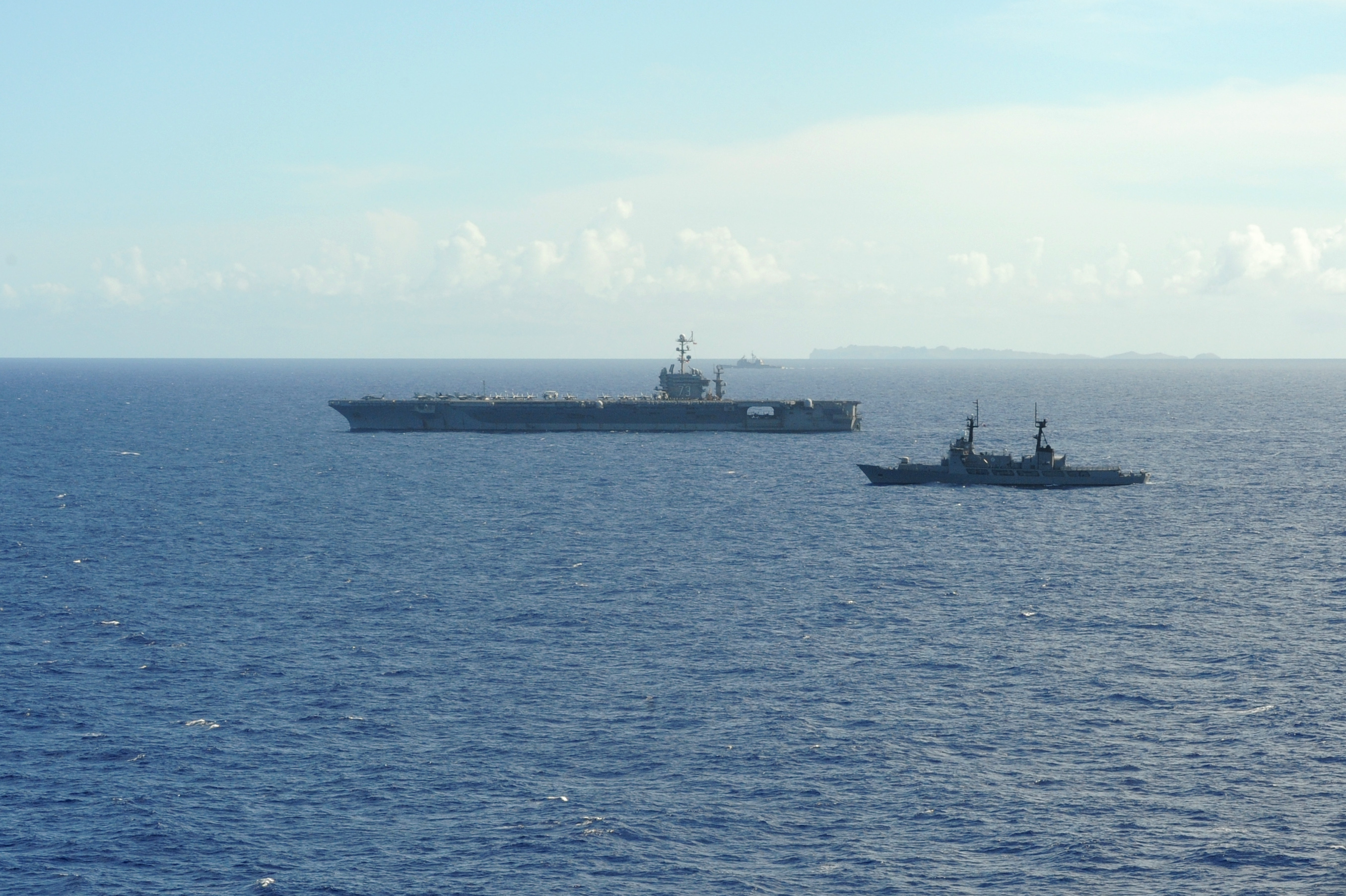
The aircraft carrier USS George Washington (CVN-73), left, moves alongside the Philippine frigate BRP Gregorio del Pilar (PF-15) in the Philippine Sea Nov. 17, 2013, during Operation Damayan.

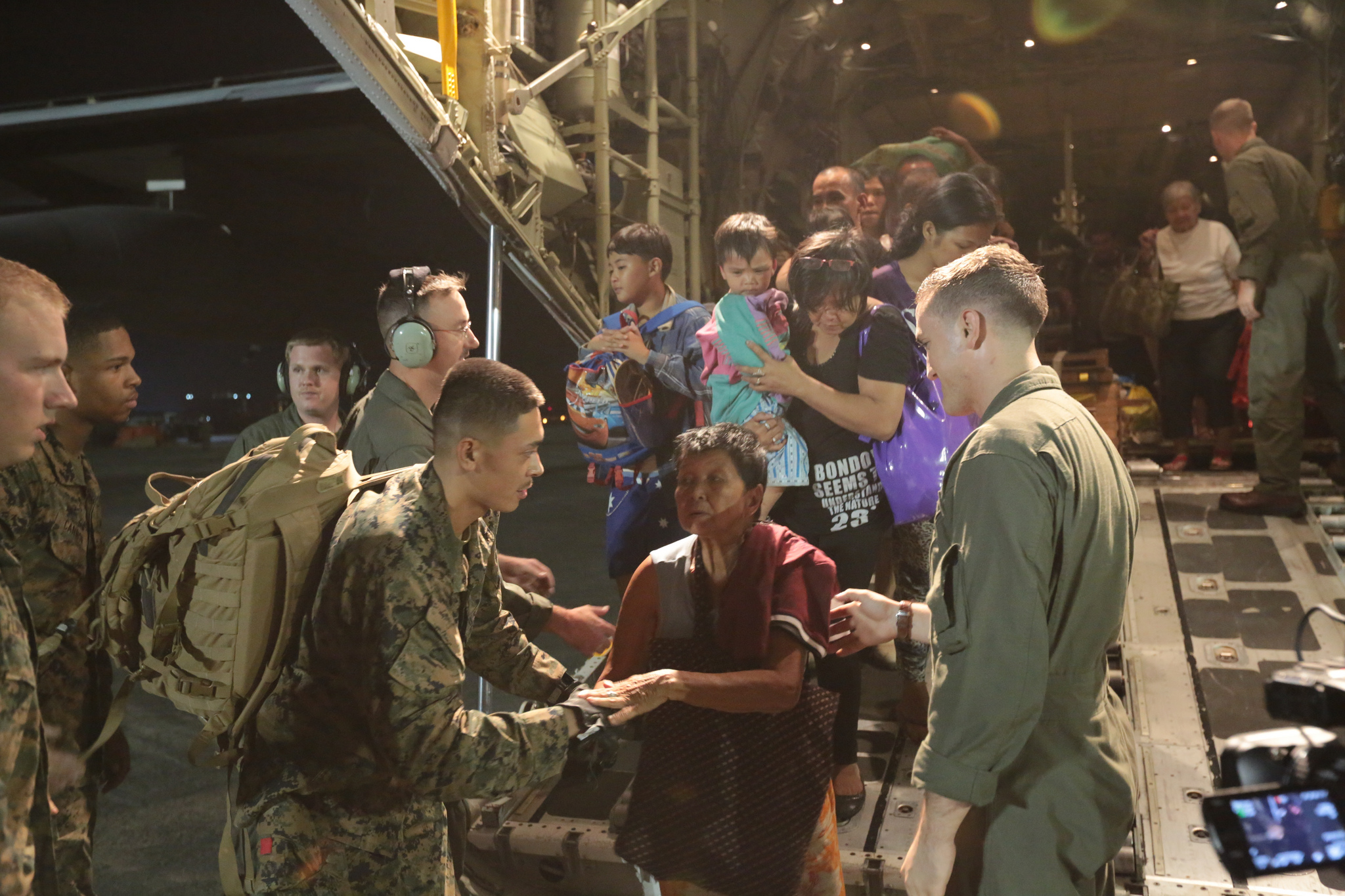
U.S. Marines assisting in the Philippine disaster relief.

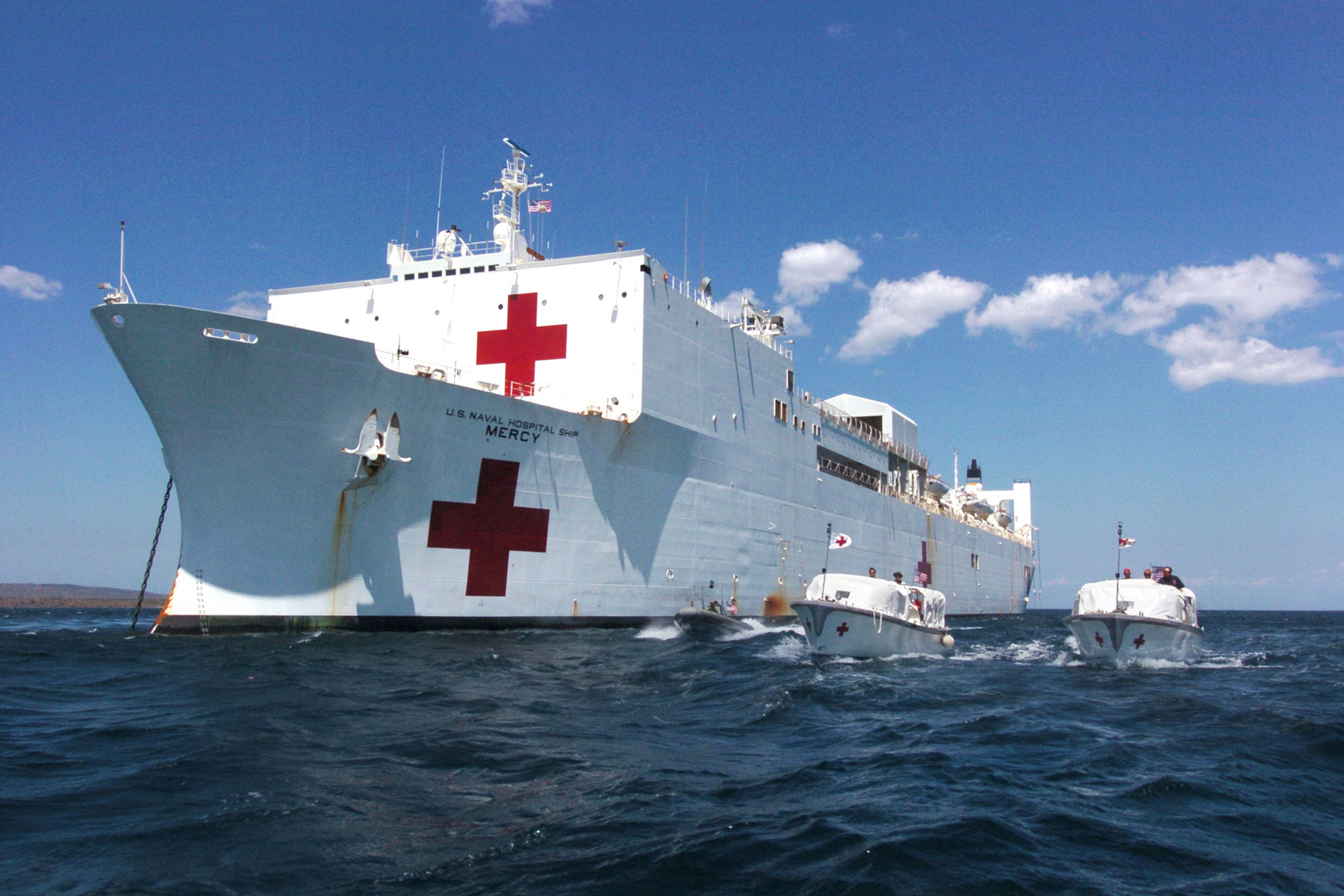
Hospital ship USNS Mercy

The government of Colombia, through its Ministry of Foreign Affairs, expressed its lament toward the dramatic consequences caused by typhoon Haiyan and offered to collaborate in any way possible at the request of the Philippine government. A plan was also implemented to aid its affected nationals and anyone in general with ties to Colombia through its consulate general in Manila. Chile also pledged to send humanitarian aid. Mexico donated US$1,000,000.

=== Canada ===
Canada announced US$5 million in immediate aid, as well as matching any contributions Canadians would make until December 8. In the first two weeks, Canada contributed US$40 million. Members of the Disaster Assistance Response Team (DART) were also deployed (using a Canadian military C-17 Globemaster) to conduct search and rescue operations in affected areas, provide humanitarian aid, and help repair damaged infrastructure. As well, three teams of rescuers, paramedics and others were dispatched to the disaster zone by GlobalMedic, a Toronto-based NGO, along with large quantities of water purification supplies and equipment. A field hospital manned by the Canadian Red Cross was sent to Iloilo City to help with people there, with a DART team tasked to help them deploy it.

=== United States ===
The United States initially contributed US$20 million in aid in food and relief goods; this was later increased to US$37 million. The official military relief efforts became known as Operation Damayan. Twelve V-22 Ospreys from Medium Tiltrotor Squadron 262 and Medium Tiltrotor Squadron 265 were immediately deployed from Marine Corps Air Station Futenma in Japan to assist in delivering supplies; and the United States Air Force's 36th Contingency Response Group was deployed to assist with the re-opening of the Daniel Z. Romualdez Airport in Tacloban. Defense Secretary Chuck Hagel ordered the Pacific Command to deploy vessels, including the aircraft carrier USS George Washington (CVN-73) and its carrier strike group, to the region and aircraft for search and rescue missions as well as to deliver relief supplies. Other ships in the strike force include the supply ship USNS Charles Drew (T-AKE-10), the submarine tender USS Emory S. Land (AS-39), the cruisers USS Cowpens (CG-63) and USS Antietam (CG-54), the destroyers USS Lassen (DDG-82) and USS Mustin (DDG-89), the oceanographic survey ship USNS Bowditch (T-AGS-62). and the oiler USNS Yukon (T-AO-202). The hospital ship USNS Mercy (pictured) was also activated. As of November 17, 19 USAF C-130 Hercules transport planes operating out of Clark Air Base were dedicated to ferrying supplies to and evacuating victims from the region. Three C-17 Globemaster III aircraft based at Joint Base Pearl Harbor–Hickam and Joint Base Elmendorf-Richardson also flew many airlift flights into Tacloban airport, delivering food, water, and evacuating refugees back to Manila. They were also instrumental in bringing in Philippine Army supplies to reopen the Tacloban airport. Three amphibious ships based in Sasebo, Japan, the USS Germantown (LSD-42), the USS Ashland (LSD-48), and the USS Denver (LPD-9) were also deployed and arrived on November 19 bringing an additional 1,000 marines to augment the 850 marines already on the ground. The littoral combat ship USS Freedom (LCS-1) was also deployed to the region on November 18. A total of 13,000 US military personnel committed to the relief effort.

On the eve of the typhoon, several members of the Philippine-American community in Chicago organized a group called "Help For Haiyan", which became the largest response by an entire U.S. city to help the victims of the typhoon. Over a thousand people volunteered every day for 2 weeks in the bitter cold making local headlines every day and over 20 containers of relief supplies were collected and distributed to help with rebuilding and recovery efforts.

== Asia ==
=== East Asia ===
China, also affected by Typhoon Haiyan, donated US$200,000 to the Philippine relief effort. China provided a donation of US$1.4 million worth of relief supplies. China also sent its naval hospital ship Peace Ark. Hong Kong chief executive CY Leung expressed his deepest sympathies for the typhoon victims. There was a call to postpone the proposed economic sanctions on the Philippines as a result of the poor handling of the Manila hostage crisis three years before. The Legislative Council of Hong Kong approved on 15 November 2013 an injection of HK$40m to the government's Disaster Relief Fund for charity organisations to apply.

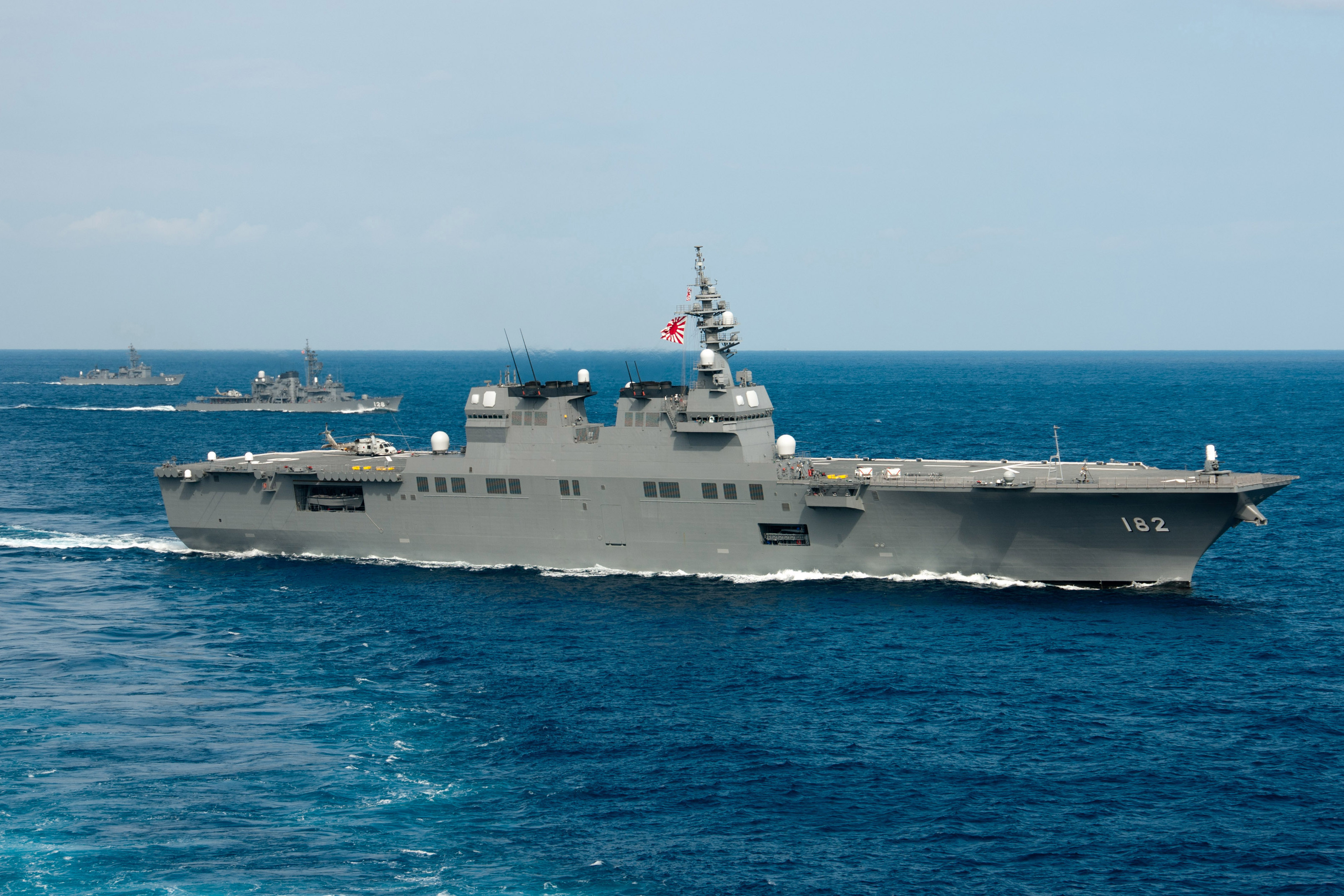
The Japanese destroyer Ise

Japan offered humanitarian assistance and sent an assessment team of two people from its Ministry of Foreign Affairs and the Japan Disaster Relief Medical Team to the typhoon-affected areas. The foreign ministry of Japan said it would give $30 million in emergency grant aid to the disaster-struck nation, up from a previous $10 million. Another $2 million worth of emergency relief goods and assistance is being delivered through Japanese non-governmental organisations. Tokyo said the total package would reach about $52 million including a $20 million contribution to its poverty reduction fund at the Manila-based Asian Development Bank. In addition monetary aid, Japan also offered military assistance by dispatching three vessels carrying more than 1,000 troops to the Philippines in the largest single relief operations team deployed by the Japanese Self-Defense Forces as well as 10 military aircraft. Amongst the military vehicles dispatched include the transport vessel Osumi and the destroyer Ise. The offer had support from the typhoon survivors.

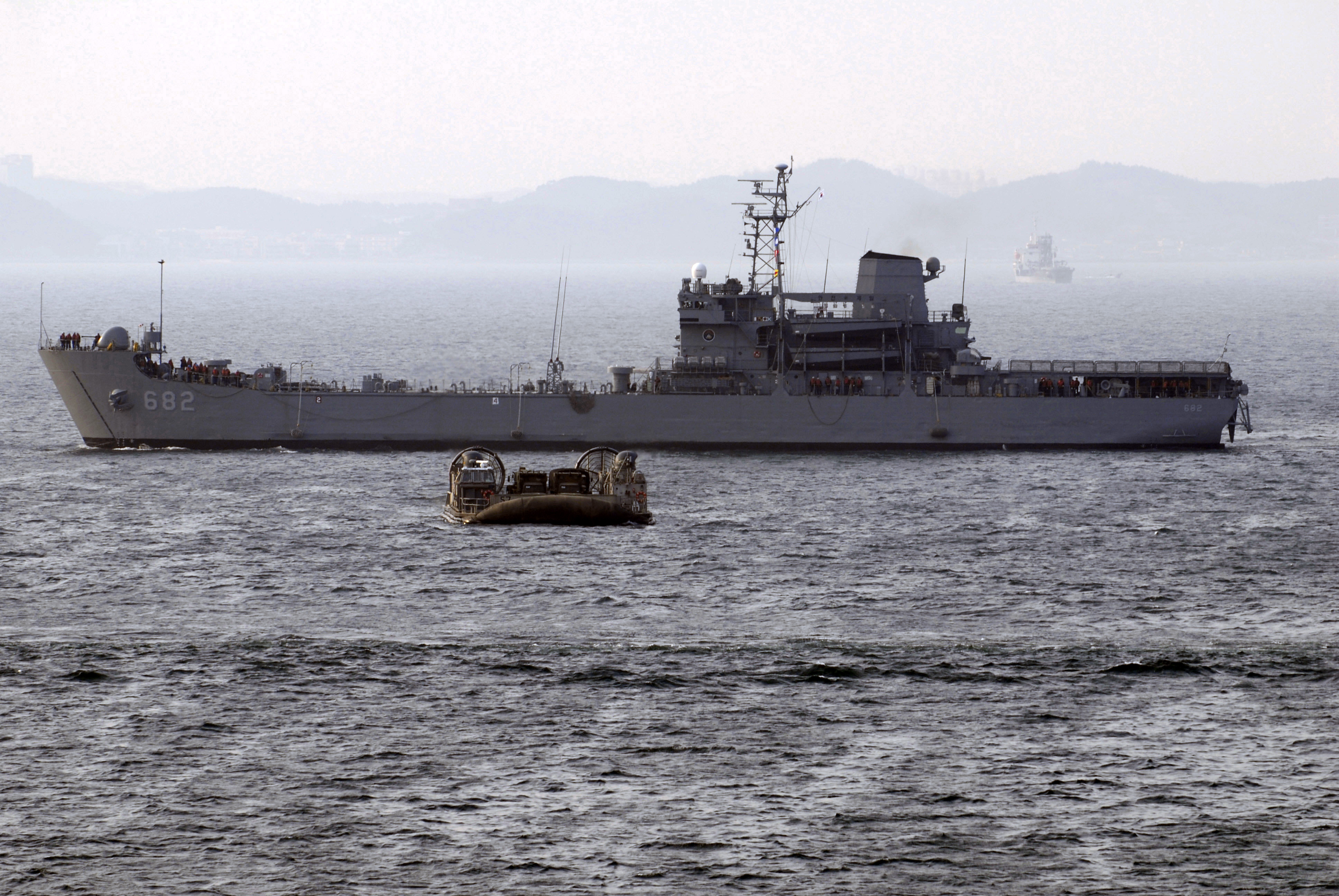
Korean Amphibious Landing Ship Bi Ro Bong (LST 682)

South Korea has offered humanitarian assistance including Humanitarian teams, emergency relief team composing of at least 34 people, and sent humanitarian aids amounting to $5 million including Relief goods (family tents, water purifiers, beef fried rice, blankets, and sanitation kits) which is transferred from its Ministry of Foreign Affairs to DSWD Philippines at first. The foreign ministry of South Korea said that not only governmental organisations but also the others including non-governmental organisations, enterprises, and other else such as Good Neighbors, and Samsung donated monetary aids amount at least $1.1 million to the disaster-struck nation. Next, an emergency relief team composing of (two batches of medical and rescue personnel, 17-man survey team) people, and more than 520 troops of the Korean Army along with 2 C-130 planes, Bi Ro Bong LST, and Sung In Bong LST for humanitarian transport were dispatched. Also, Government of South Korea will offer $20 million ODA for construction and rehabilitation in 2014–2016.

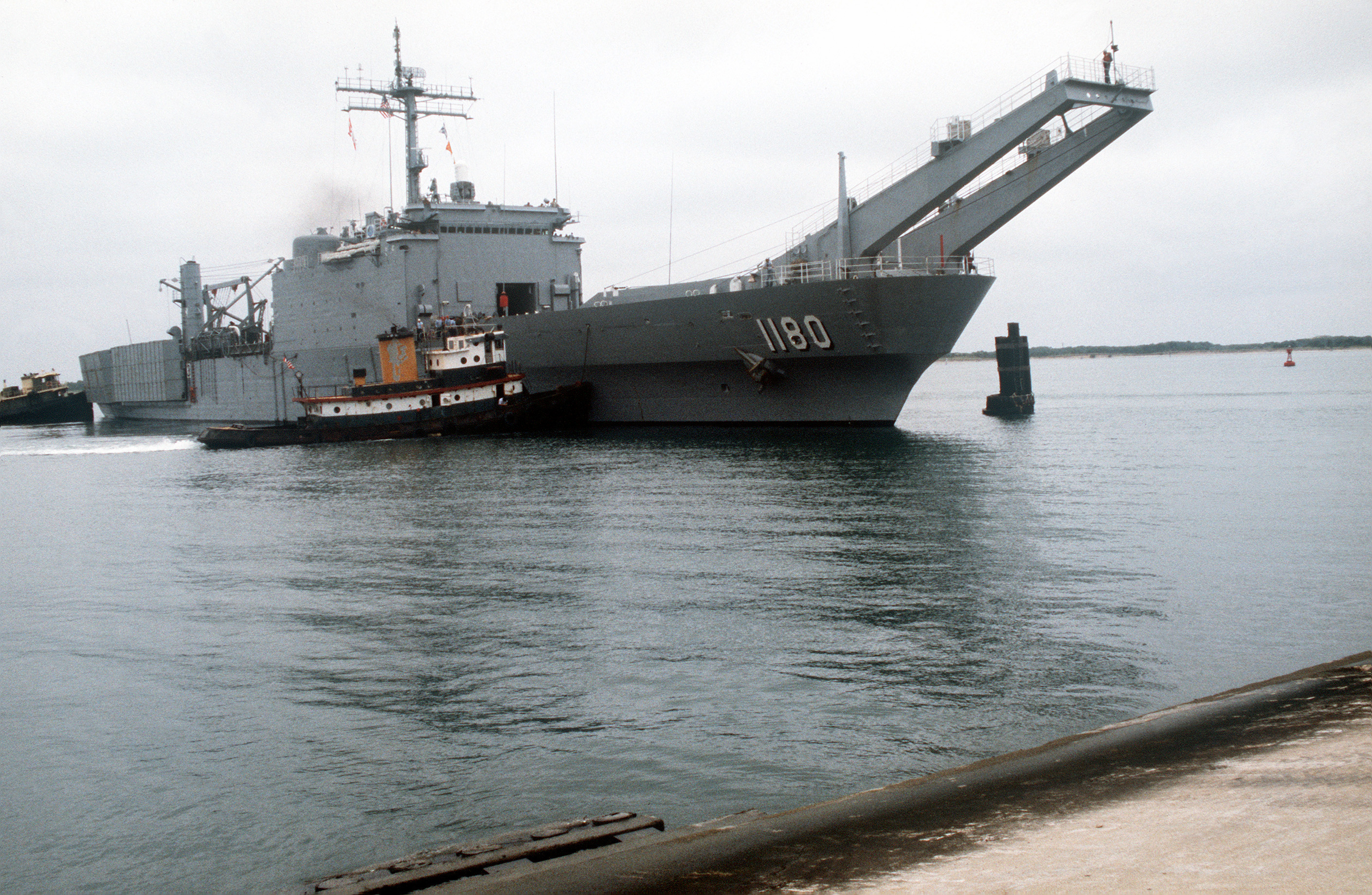
Taiwanese Naval Landing Ship Chong ho joined the relief mission

Taiwan, also influenced by typhoon Haiyan, sent estimated total amount of US$12.3 million donated relief materials (at least 680 tons) and money as of mid-December. Among this, Taiwanese Government pledged $200,000 in relief funding at the first moment. As a close neighboring country of Philippines, Taiwan is the first country delivering relief supplies to Philippines by Navy vessels and Air Force crafts. In addition, a 35-person team organized by the Taiwan Root Medical Peace Corps arrived in the affected areas to provide free medical assistance.

=== Eurasia ===
Russia offered to send a rescue team of 200 people to calamity-affected areas in the Philippines. The Russian Ministry of Emergency Situations (EMERCOM) opened up a hotline for its citizens to keep themselves updated with details about the typhoon and to share information about Russians in the Philippines who may have been affected by the calamity.

EMERCOM personnel and Il-76 planes have been deployed to assist in relief and medical efforts after requests were made from Manila to Moscow, which was officially announced by Russian Foreign Minister Sergei Lavrov.

=== Middle East ===
Middle Eastern countries, where about 2 million Filipinos work, also pledged their aid. The country of Saudi Arabia donated $10 million to the Philippines for disaster relief Saudi Arabia has also sent other humanitarian assistance on relief flights; "Saudia Cargo is proud to have been one of the first operators to arrive in Cebu, Philippines with urgently needed humanitarian aid, flying on behalf of an international aid agency and its broker Chapman Freeborn Air Chartering." Saudi Prince Talal bin Abdul Aziz pledged $100,000 from the kingdom. Meanwhile, United Arab Emirates President Khalifa bin Zayed Al Nahyan personally gave his condolences to President Aquino and donated $10,000,000. Kuwait has pledged to send $10 million in aid to the Philippines. Israel promised to send medical and search and rescue teams after a six-man consisting of personnel from the Israeli Foreign Ministry and the Israeli Defense Forces' Home Command would survey and assess the situation. Bahrain has offered to provide 90 tons of relief items to the Philippines; and the King of Bahrain King Hamad bin Isa Al Khalifa offered to send "4,000 food parcels; 2,216 personal hygiene packs; 20,000 blankets; 500 tents; 100 power generators; 20,000 towels; 20,000 pillows; 1,000 bottles of water; 2,000 water containers; and 1,000 pieces of mats,". Qatar says it will send "two shipments including 80 tonnes of food, tents, blankets, clothes and medications" as aid to the Philippines. The Iranian Red Crescent Society announced in November 12 that it would offer humanitarian assistance. Iranian Foreign Ministry Spokeswoman Marziyeh Afkham expressed her government's and people's deep sympathies to the victims. Iran's president Hassan Rouhani also echoed the previous Iranian calls of sympathy to his Philippine counterpart on November 12. Turkey has sent humanitarian assistance to the Philippines; the Turkish Red Crescent sent a shipment consisting of "550 tents, 550 food kits and 5125 blankets and was delivered to Philippines Red Cross in Manila."

=== Southeast Asia ===
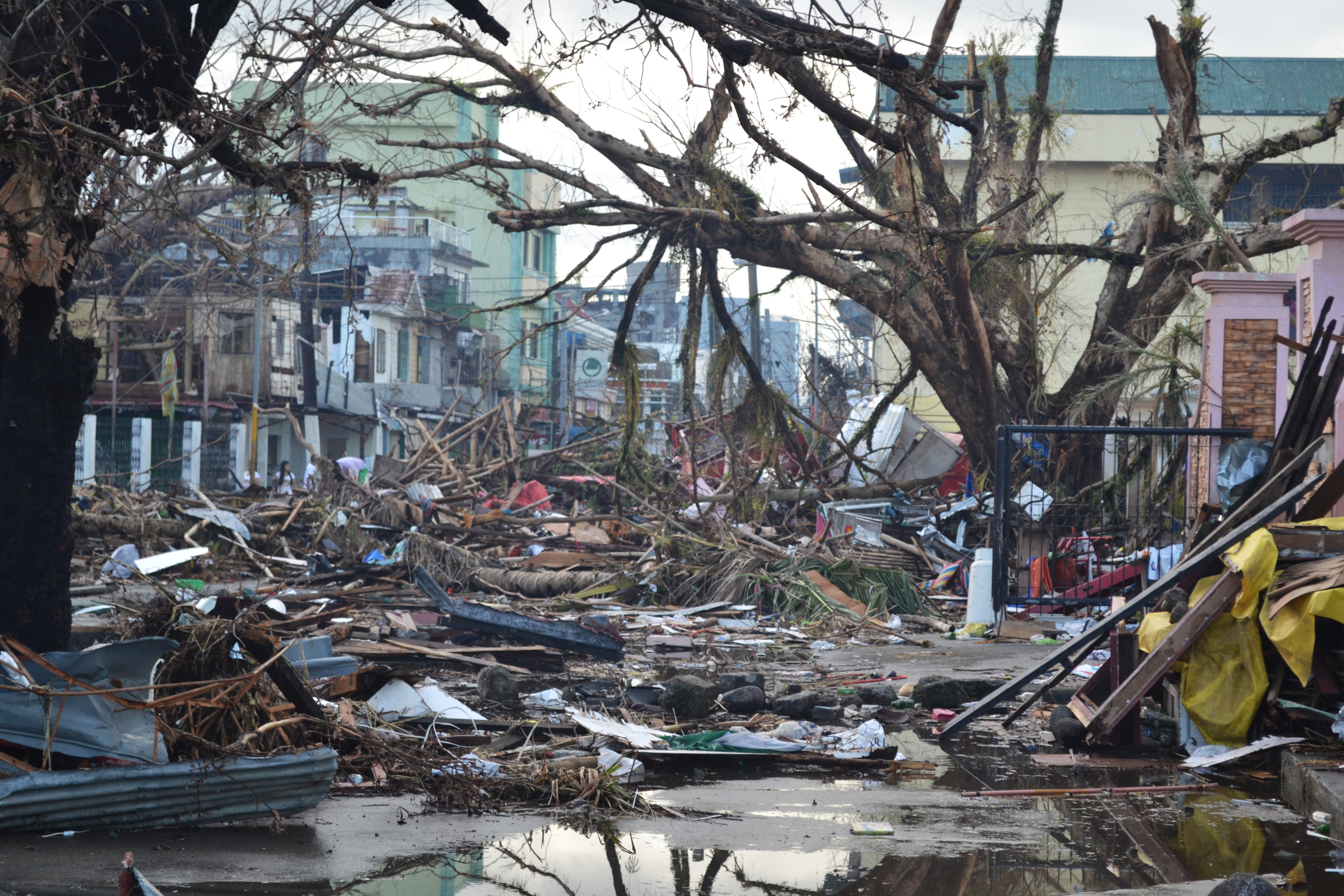
Debris littering the streets of Tacloban City on November 14, nearly a week after the storm struck

On November 10, Indonesian President Susilo Bambang Yudhoyono has ordered the Indonesian National Disaster Mitigation Agency (BNPB) to provide humanitarian and disaster assistance to the Philippines government. Indonesia has sent food, medicines and generators on its fourth disaster relief mission. On 12 November 2013, Indonesia has donated $2 million for the Philippines as part of ASEAN solidarity. The receipt of aid was handed to the Philippines’ ambassador to Jakarta Maria Rosario C. Aguinaldo by Coordinating Minister of Welfare Agung Laksono on Tuesday, 12 November 2013. The aid of $2 million consisted of $1 million of demand deposit and $1 million in goods and logistics. The goods weight 75 tons in total. Three Indonesian Air Force Hercules aircraft deployed with supplies and stationed in Cebu to help distribute the emergency supplies to the affected areas. Indonesian logistical aid including aircraft, food, generators and medicine. In addition, the Indonesian Red Cross deployed KM Emir cargo ship loaded with 688.862 tonnes emergency supplies and also 30 Indonesian Red Cross volunteers to the Philippines.

On November 11, Malaysian Defence Minister Hishammuddin Hussein contacted Philippine Defense Secretary Voltaire Gazmin to determine the aid required. Beside that, the Malaysian Filipino community has started collecting relief items to be sent to the country. Brunei Sultan Hassanal Bolkiah has expressed his and the people of Brunei's deepest sympathies to President Benigno Aquino over the situation along with the sending of an emergency team from his country. On November 13, the Malaysian government stated it will contribute $1 million along with the sending of essential items such as food and medicines worth $310 thousand using the RMAF Charlie C-130 aircraft while Brunei send its humanitarian aid such as mineral water bottles, light food, canned food, rice, milk formula, medical equipment, medicine, clothes, blankets and towels which donated by the Cabinet of Brunei, Royal Brunei Armed Forces, National Disaster Management Centre, members of the public, the private sector and non-government organisations via the RBAF CN-235. The Malaysian major commercial bank Maybank also contributed to donate $330,000 to the Philippine Red Cross along with the arriving of the Malaysian disaster relief team. On 22 November, the Malaysian Red Crescent has raised a total of $55,000 donations from the public and ready to deploy a Rapid Deployment Squad to the Philippines.

The Singapore Red Cross received S$145,000 in donations from members of the public and S$200,000 from the Singapore government for humanitarian aid. Singapore has also deployed C-130 aircraft from its Air Force to transport relief supplies to Tacloban. Vietnam, another Haiyan-affected country, donated US$100,000 to the Philippine relief effort. The Vietnam Red Cross is still currently collecting donations and provisions for relief. Thailand have also offered humanitarian aid in the form of relief material. Thai Prime Minister Yingluck Shinawatra told the Public Health Ministry, the three branches of the armed forces and the Foreign Affairs Ministry to take responsibility for organizing the aid, which consisted of food, drinking water and medical aid.

=== South Asia ===
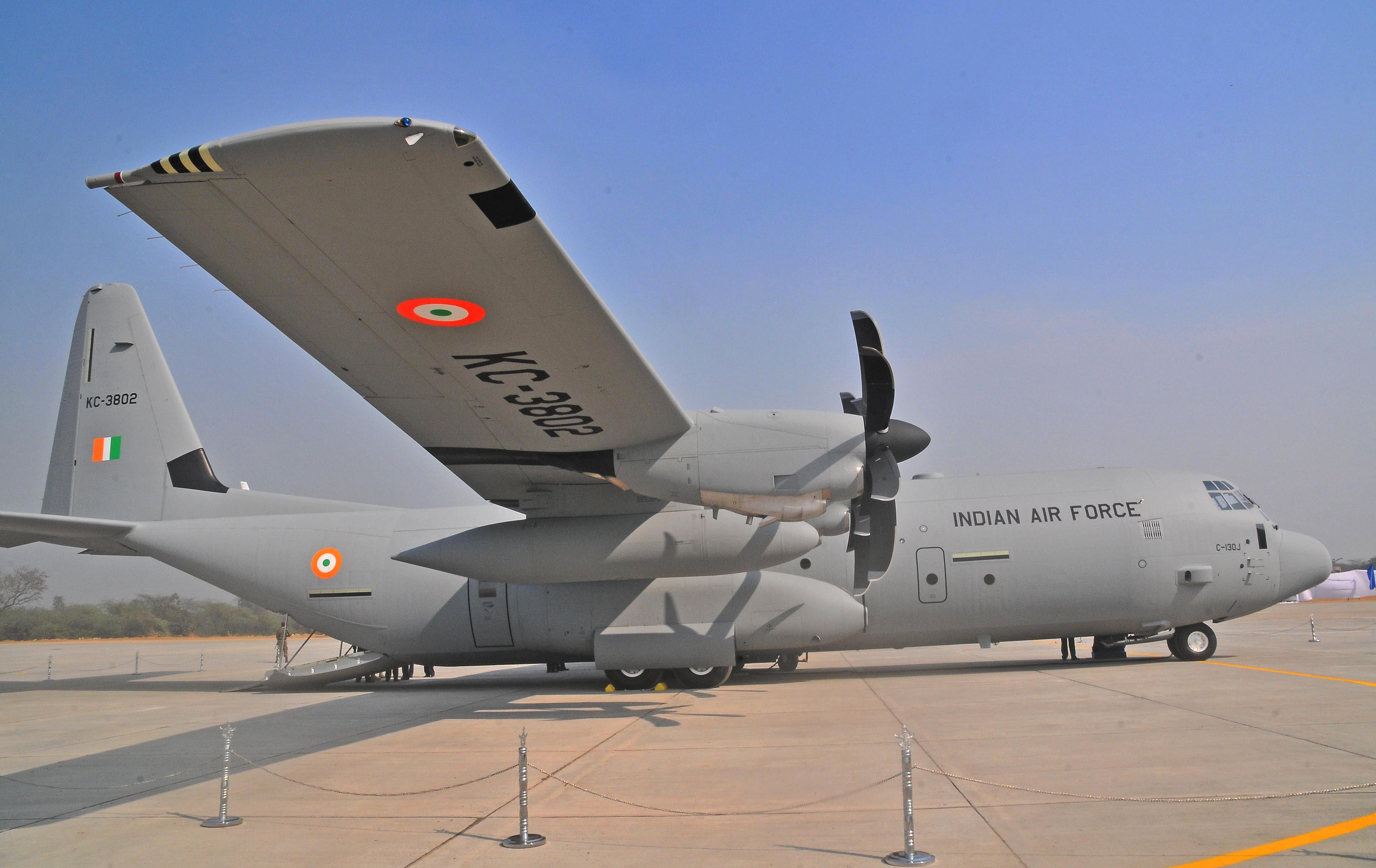
Indian Air Force C-130J

Bangladesh announces humanitarian assistance worth US$1 million for the victims.

India has pledged immediate supply of 15 tonnes of relief material. India will be following it up by sending a ship with relief material to the affected areas. On 14 November, India sent a relief package comprising medicines, hygiene and chemicals, tents, blankets, tarpaulins and ready to eat meals by an air force C-130J.

== Europe ==
Germany has been transporting 23 tons of aid as well as supplying rescue teams. The United Kingdom has offered a support package worth £50 million, in addition to £30 million raised by a Disasters Emergency Committee public appeal. HMS Illustrious, HMS Daring and a Royal Air Force Boeing C-17 Globemaster III have also been deployed to the Philippines. The Irish government dispatched around 100 tonnes of emergency supplies from its UN humanitarian aid stocks which are being distributed by Plan Ireland, along with €1 million already pledged by the government. The European Union has offered US$4.2 million.

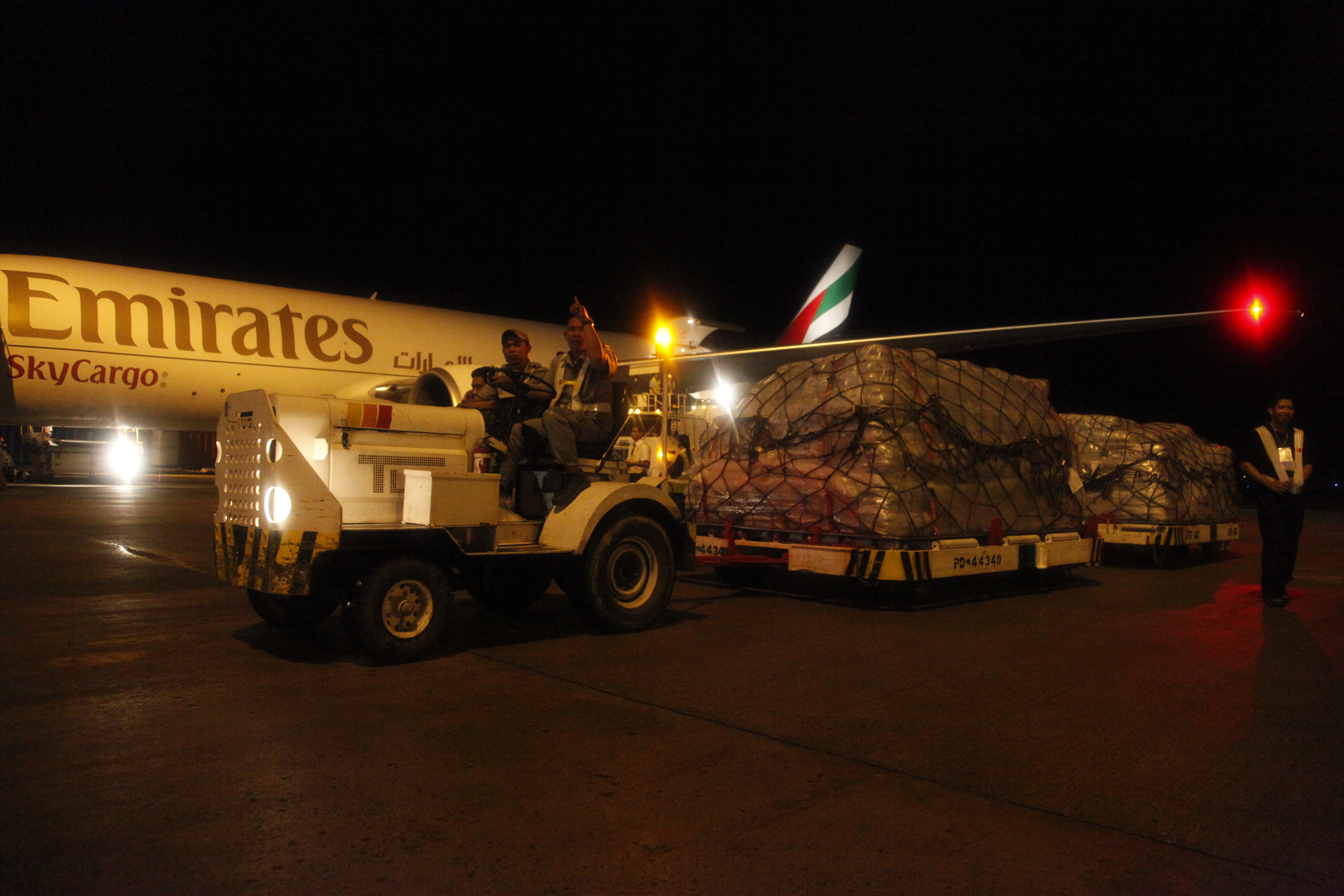
First UK-funded humanitarian flight arrives at Mactan–Cebu International Airport.

The Government of Norway has provided 255 million NOK (US$41.6 million) in aid that will be dispersed through Red Cross and UN for actions in the Philippines. Additionally, 70 tonnes of advanced communication equipment was dispatched. Norwegians supported various aid agencies, such as the Norwegian Red Cross and the Norwegian branch of Save the Children, with donations through texting reaching 30 million NOK (US$4.9 million). The Norwegian Shipowners' Association sent its training vessel into the affected areas, becoming the first civilian ship to take part in the rescue efforts. The ship departed Manila for Tacloban with 100 tonnes of food and medical equipment and personnel. On October 24, a relief concert with various Norwegian artists was held in Norway for the victims of the typhoon in the Philippines. During the 70 min. TV broadcast, Norwegians donated another 24,7 million NOK (US$4 million). |-

The Vatican announced that it will donate $150,000. Pope Francis expressed his sympathy and asked for people to pray in solidarity for the victims.

== Oceania ==
Australia has pledged $30 million in relief aid. A Royal Australian Air Force C-17 Globemaster and C-130 Hercules transported emergency supplies, a medical team and 60 bed field hospital from Darwin to Tacloban on November 13. The Royal Australian Navy heavy landing ship HMAS Tobruk left Townsville for Tacloban on November 18 carrying emergency supplies, including water purifiers, generators, earth moving equipment, tents and vehicles.

New Zealand committed $5.1 million for the relief operations. A Royal New Zealand Air Force C-130 Hercules delivered 30 tonnes of food and medical supplies to Tacloban and Ormoc, then helped transport supplies and survivors.

The National Fisheries Authority of Papua New Guinea made a check donation worth PGK100 thousand. Finance Minister, James Marape also announced that the government of Papua New Guinea has pledged to give PGK3 million of aid to assist on relief operations.

== Digital Humanitarians ==
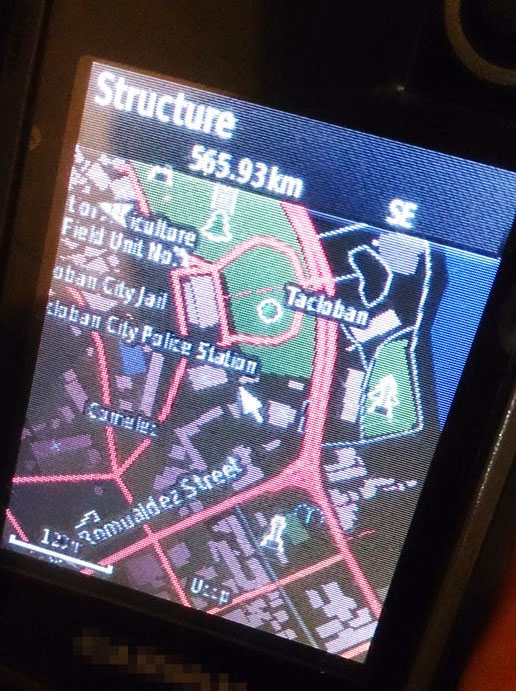
A handheld GPS device showing Tacloban map based from Openstreetmap Philippines.

On the eve before Haiyan's landfall, digital humanitarian responders through Humanitarian OpenStreetMap Team has called upon volunteers to map locations in the Philippines where the supertyphoon may make its landfall. The call has resulted various satellite imagery companies such as DigitalGlobe, CNES-Astrium, and Landsat to release free post-typhoon imagery to disaster-stricken locations; which on the other hand prompted 1,670 mapping advocates worldwide to take action. This resulted to a record-breaking mapping updates response enabling over a million map updates in only a week after Haiyan's landfall. The contributed mapping data enabled street-level accurate post-disaster maps on various islands in the Visayas region hit by typhoon Haiyan to OpenStreetMap. On the other hand, raw data from OpenStreetMap has been extracted, compiled and has been produced to various products including paper maps and daily-updated GPS-assisted navigation maps which has helped various international on-field humanitarian agencies such as the International Red Cross, American Red Cross, International Organization for Migration, United Nations Office for the Coordination of Humanitarian Affairs, USAID, to operate on relief and rescue operations accurately.

== Other ==
American band Journey donated $350,000 to help relief efforts in the Philippines, and its lead singer had a message for his homeland: "Don't Stop Believin'". Arnel Pineda (the band's Filipino vocalist) and the rest of the band announced the donation on November 15, 2013. It will go to the United Nations World Food Programme, which is providing Filipinos with food assistance. The donation should provide 1.4 million meals. IKEA, Walmart, Samsung, and HSBC are among those taking advantage of the event to donate to those in need. Northwestern Mutual announced they will donate $100,000 to the American Red Cross. The Coca-Cola Company says they have donated $2.5 million of their advertising budget to the relief efforts as of November 25. By mid-December FIFA donated $1 million. DHL deployed its Asia Pacific Disaster Response Team to the disaster areas to provide on-the-ground logistics support to assist with the relief effort in the aftermath of the devastating Typhoon Haiyan. Three rotating teams made up of volunteer employees from the Asia Pacific region were based at the Mactan Cebu Airport on Cebu island, providing support and assistance to the country's most affected areas west of Leyte Island, including Guiuan, Roxas, and Tacloban city.

Major League Baseball donated $200,000 to UNICEF and the American Red Cross, with Commissioner Bud Selig encouraging fans to donate to the organizations. UNICEF delivered portable toilets and hygiene supplies to the region and also appealed for $34 million to help the four million children affected. The American Red Cross announced that they collected $11 million in donations for the Philippines Relief Fund. Mercy Corps dispatched an "emergency response" team to help with humanitarian efforts. MAP International launched medical relief efforts providing over $10 million in medicines and supplies to the Philippines. Maritime/Shipping company Marlow Navigation helped provide financial support to rebuild schools and classrooms in the Philippines impacted by the disaster. This support continued in 2015, with further school enhancements and building programmes.

Among the NGO responses, among the most comprehensive disaster response came from the Taiwan-based Buddhist Tzu Chi Foundation, which organized a large-scale cash-for-work program in Tacloban from Nov 20 to Dec 8 with up to 31,000 participants per day, totaling nearly 300,000 day shifts. This operation not only helped clean out the thousands of tons of debris covering the city, but also kick-started the local economy. Tzu Chi also contributed emergency cash aid of 8000, 12000 or 15000 pesos depending on family size for over 60,000 families in the affected areas of Tacloban, Ormoc, Palo, Tanauan and Tunga, and has been providing free clinics, hot meals, and temporary class rooms for over 15 schools in the area. Doctors Without Borders is sending 200 tons of aid. The Center for Disaster Philanthropy collaborated with more than 25 donors to award grants focused on maternal health, including projects aimed at ensuring the safe birth and delivery of Haiyan-affected women and their newborns. The International Society for Krishna Consciousness's Food For Life Global, the world's largest vegan food relief organisation, raised money and provided vegan meals in the Philippines to Typhoon Haiyan survivors. Other NGOs run by faith-based organisations that raised money and/or aided in the disaster relief efforts of Typhoon Haiyan included Catholic Relief Services, Catholic Medical Mission Board (CMMB), Adventist Development and Relief Agency (ADRA), LDS Philanthropies, American Jewish Joint Distribution Committee (AJJDC), Samaritan's Purse, Salvation Army, Christian Children's Fund of Canada, MAP International and World Vision.

The Iglesia ni Cristo (INC), the largest indigenous Christian church based in the Philippines held a series of massive relief distributions including medical and dental missions to the affected population of the storm to different parts of Visayas. The humanitarian mission was done under the "Lingap sa Mamamayan" (Aid for Humanity) project in cooperation with the Felix Y. Manalo (FYM) Foundation Inc., the INC's charitable arm.

Celebrities such as David and Victoria Beckham, Stephen Colbert, Kim Kardashian, David Guetta, and The X Factor contributed to the fundraising. On November 26, iTunes released a compilation album entitled Songs for the Philippines featuring different artists, including Katy Perry, Madonna, Bob Dylan, and The Beatles. All proceeds will go to the Philippine Red Cross. OneRepublic donated $100,000 on November 30, 2013. Other celebrities that offered their support included Linkin Park, The Offspring, Alicia Keys, and Justin Bieber.

On the day of his death, actor Paul Walker attended a charity event for his organization, Reach Out Worldwide, for the victims of the typhoon that was held right before his accident.

On March 11, 2014, a benefit concert called The Pinoy Relief Benefit Concert was held at Madison Square Garden in New York, City. Jennifer Hudson, Pentatonix, A Great Big World, Plain White T's, Jessica Sanchez, Charice and REO Brothers performed. Special guests also included Dr. Oz, Dante Basco, Bobby Lopez, Kristen Anderson-Lopez and Apl.de.ap. 100% of proceeds raised directly went to the Typhoon Haiyan survivors. Pinoy Relief was created to help survivors and focus on three specific areas: restoring livelihoods, building classrooms and providing shelter in partnership with local NGOs, Habitat for Humanity Philippines and Operation Blessing Philippines.

On December 17, 2013, NetHope deployed a team to Tacloban equipped with a UAV system from Sky-Watch. The team was sent there to aid in the damage assessment of the Tacloban airport and aid in the search for missing persons.

== Politics involving aid relief ==
Media reports initially noted the disparate aid responses by the United States and China against the backdrop of rising tensions between the Philippines and China over the two countries's competing territorial claims in the South China Sea.

Fox News initially criticized China for its contribution of US$100,000 cash each from the government and the Chinese Red Cross to the typhoon victims, which led to commentary about its disputes with the Philippines. Earlier in 2013, the Philippines sued China over the nine-dash line. Western commentators attributed this low amount to China's intentions to isolate the Philippines while strengthening its ties with the rest of Southeast Asia. The move elicited mixed reactions from the Chinese public and government with some commending its decision while others, such as Global Times, a tabloid newspaper owned by the Chinese Communist Party, insisted that China should behave like a responsible power. China later increased its contributions by US$1.64 million and sent its naval hospital ship Peace Ark for disaster relief."

The United States gave the Philippines aid worth US$51.9 million and deployed the United States Marines, United States Navy and United States Air Force to assist with the humanitarian operations. The Philippine government had been discussing with the U.S. plans regarding the deployment of U.S. military troops within the country. An article in the journal Social Medicine said this was part of the "Asia pivot" that the United States government had previously announced, a foreign policy strategy it viewed as a plan to contain China, encircle it militarily, and prevent it from competing with American political influence in the region.

== See also ==
- 2013 Pacific typhoon season
- Effects of the 2013 Pacific typhoon season in the Philippines
- Typhoon Haiyan
