= Catholic Medical Mission Board =

American nonprofit organization

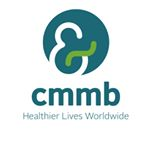
- Abbreviation: CMMB
- Formation: 1912–1928
- Founder: Dr. Paluel Flagg
- Type: 501(c)(3)
- Legal status: Active
- Purpose: Women’s and children’s health
- Headquarters: 1212 Avenue of the Americas, 11th Floor; New York, NY 10036
- Region served: Worldwide
- Key people: Mary Beth Powers (CEO); Stephen Sichak (Board Chair)
- Employees: 553 (2018)
- Volunteers: 661 (2018)
- Website: www.cmmb.org

The Catholic Medical Mission Board (CMMB) is an international, faith-based NGO providing long-term, co-operative medical and development aid to communities affected by poverty and healthcare issues. It was established in 1912 and officially registered in 1928. CMMB is headquartered in New York City, USA and currently has country offices in Haiti, Kenya, Peru, South Sudan and Zambia.

CMMB's health programs include Children and Mothers Partnerships (CHAMPS), shipping of medical supplies, placement of international medical and non-medical volunteers, HIV/AIDS, prevention and treatment of neglected tropical diseases and disaster relief to areas that experienced natural or political catastrophes. CMMB actively works with the U.S. government on programming such as the President's Emergency Plan for AIDS Relief (PEPFAR) and USAID, CDC multilateral donors include UNICEF, UNHCR, and PAHO, and public-private partnerships including the Survive and Thrive Global Development Alliance.

== Programs ==
=== CHAMPS ===
Children and Mothers Partnerships (CHAMPS) is CMMB's long-term initiative to address the leading causes of maternal and child death, disability, and illness, including diarrhea, pneumonia, malaria and HIV. The program works both at community and clinical levels throughout Africa, Latin America and the Caribbean. It addresses common causes of poor health, including access to clean water, healthcare facilities and medicine supply, sanitation, agriculture/nutrition, and socio-economic development.

=== Medical donations and volunteer programs ===
Sending volunteers and medical supplies to resource-poor areas are two of the original and continuing programs of CMMB. The pharmaceutical program distributes donated medicines and medical supplies. In 2018, this program shipped $703,729,464 worth of products and medications worldwide to 114 consignees in 35 countries. Over ten years, CMMB has provided over US$2 billion worth of donated medicines to local healthcare partners in 120 countries. CMMB's volunteer program provides medical and business expertise for community development at faith-based facilities in Haiti, Kenya, Peru, South Sudan, Zambia, and elsewhere.

=== HIV/AIDS ===
CMMB provides HIV/AIDS care, treatment, and support across all age groups and genders. Between 2003 and 2013 CMMB has participated in the U.S. government-funded AIDS Relief care and treatment program (PEPFAR) which has helped more than 700,000 HIV-infected people worldwide. It also partnered with the Choose To Care program of the Southern African Catholic Bishops Conference, which was funded by the Bristol-Myers Squibb Foundation and others, lending assistance to more than 140 community-based initiatives in South Africa, Namibia, Swaziland, Lesotho, and Botswana.

=== DREAMS ===
Since 2015, CMMB has been part of the DREAMS project, a USAID funded project working in 10 countries of sub-Saharan Africa to reduce the number of new HIV infections in adolescent girls and young women. DREAMS is an acronym signifying what partners hope for all girls worldwide to be: determined, resilient empowered, AIDS-free, mentored, and safe. CMMB has been working on this project in Kenya and Zambia, mentoring adolescent girls and young women to overcome the challenges of adolescence and stay in school.

=== Program areas ===
CMMB has 11 key program areas its projects seek to address. They are:

- Maternal Health
- Nutrition
- Women's Health
- HIV Treatment & Prevention
- Children's Health Care
- Economic Empowerment
- Advocacy
- Water and Sanitation
- Emergency Response
- Health Systems Strengthening
- Non Communicable Diseases

== History ==
The history of CMMB (known as a committee of the Catholic Hospital Association until 1927) dates back to 1912, when a personal tragedy inspired CMMB's founder Dr. Paluel J. Flagg to commit to medical missionary work, beginning with leprosy patients in Haiti.

For many decades, CMMB prioritized the shipping of medical supplies and equipment to missionaries and health partners around the world. In 1949, Bishop Fulton J. Sheen, television personality and national director of the Society of the Propagation of the Faith, joined CMMB's board and served for 26 years. Another stalwart supporter of CMMB has been the surgeon Tom Catena.

In 2002, CMMB introduced Born To Live, a program designed for the prevention of mother-to-child (PMTCT) transmission of HIV which affected nearly 60,000 women in Haiti, Kenya and South Sudan.

In 2003, CMMB launched Action for Family Health to help reduce the mortality and morbidity rates of children in five Central American and Caribbean countries, through a partnership with the Pan American Health Organization (PAHO), Catholic healthcare networks, and the respective Ministries of Health in each country, providing deworming medicines to children.

In 2004, CMMB supported international and local partners in response to the tsunami disaster, committing US$3.1 million in health aid to survivors in India, Indonesia, and Sri Lanka.

CMMB became a member of the AIDS Relief consortium in response to President Bush's Emergency Plan for AIDS Relief.

In 2010, CMMB provided over US$49 million and over 500 tons of pharmaceutical and medical supplies worth US$46.7 million to Haiti for earthquake relief through its local partners, and co-founded the Haiti Amputee Coalition to provide amputees with urgent medical care, basic needs, therapy and high-quality prostheses.

In 2013, CMMB delivered medicine and medical supplies valued at more than US$10 million to survivors of typhoon Haiyan (Yolanda) in the Philippines.

In 2018 CMMB responded to eight different emergencies. CMMB sent over $5 million worth of medicines and medical supplies to the 1.7 million people affected by the eruption of Volcán de Fuego in Guatemala. CMMB's Port-de-Paix team were also among the first responders for victims of the magnitude 5.9 earthquake in Haiti. In Zambia, CMMB deployed 630,000 water purification tablets from Procter & Gamble in response to the deadly cholera outbreak. The team there continues to work to improve water and sanitation. CMMB also sent over $88 million of medicines to Syria to help treat civilian injuries due to the ongoing civil war. It also mobilized resources to provide medical care and shelter for people displaced by the severe flooding in India and assistance to people in Indonesia affected by the earthquake and tsunami. CMMB has also sent $14.5 million worth of medicine and medical supplies to partners in Yemen in response to the civil war. In South Sudan, CMMB is delivering health services for internally displaced people and working with recently released child soldiers to provide reintegration services and community-based child protection programming.

== Country offices ==
=== Haiti ===
CMMB's work in Haiti goes back to 1912, and today the Haiti country office is CMMB's largest. The health services programs and initiatives for women and children include: CHAMPS, disability rehabilitation, domestic and international volunteers, HIV/AIDS prevention, care and treatment (including prevention of mother-to-child transmission), maternal, neonatal, and child health, medical supply chain system strengthening, prevention and control of malaria, support for orphans and vulnerable children, and community health worker training.

It also partnered with Mercy Health to build a hospital, the Bishop Joseph M. Sullivan Center for Health, which was completed in 2017 and provides quality healthcare for nearly 50,000 people in Côtes-de-Fer. Joseph M. Sullivan had been Bishop of Brooklyn, New York, and on CMMB's Board of Directors. This hospital will serve a population that previously had to travel for hours over rough terrain to reach the closest health center.

CMMB is also a founding member of the Haitian Amputee Coalition, and continues to serve Haitian amputees by providing on-the-job training in this field to a group of young Haitian apprentices.

=== Kenya ===
CMMB has run comprehensive HIV care programs in Kenya since 2003. In 2010, CMMB was providing life-saving antiretroviral treatment to nearly 47,000 Kenyans, and through its mentors helps more than 24,000 people living with HIV/AIDS, including issues like social stigma, in Kenya, South Sudan and Haiti. CMMB's Women Fighting AIDS Kenya (WOFAK) is a community-based organization, providing prevention education, support groups, and clinical and nutritional care to 15,000 women and 5,000 children each year. CMMB provides voluntary medical male circumcision services as part of a comprehensive HIV-prevention package in Nairobi and Kisumu County.

CMMB programs in Kenya have built the capacity of local healthcare organizations to tackle not only HIV/AIDS but also other national health challenges. It has helped build human resources for health and work to strengthen Kenyan health systems via direct assistance on health management information systems, finance, administration, and technical training for staff.

=== Peru ===
CMMB's First 1000 Days Project focuses on improving the health and nutrition of children under the age of five and pregnant women in under-served and marginalized areas of Peru. It trains professional and community healthcare workers, advises parents on health and nutrition, provides nutritional supplementation to malnourished children, institutes community health-surveillance, and addresses issues of economic self-sufficiency through agricultural programs. Rehabilitation Hope is a special community-based service program that assists children with physical and cognitive disabilities by providing quality therapy. CHAMPS Peru complements existing community-based programs designed to improve maternal and child health.

In 2010–2013, CMMB, Bon Secours Health System, Christus Health, and Caritas del Peru partnered to implement the Unidos Contra la Mortalidad Infantil (United Against Infant Mortality) program, which was designed to decrease morbidity and mortality in children under five years of age.

=== South Sudan ===
CMMB has been working in the Republic of South Sudan since 2009, and currently works in Mvolo, Ezo, Nzara, Yambio, and Ibba counties in the greater Western Equatoria region. CMMB's work in South Sudan includes HIV/AIDS prevention, care, and treatment, refugee health services, gender-based violence prevention, child protection, and primary healthcare.

In 2009, CMMB established ANISA, healthcare initiatives to support local HIV/AIDS program. ANISA, meaning “together” in the Zande language, aims to reduce the incidence of new HIV infections through HIV testing and counseling, and to prevent PMTCT and sexual transmission of the disease. CMMB partners with World Vision which provides community outreach in HIV prevention for a target audience of over 120,000 people annually.

Since 2012, CMMB trains and provides support to birth attendants and nurses in safe delivery and infant health, along with ambulance services.

CMMB is also working with former child soldiers in the reintegration process, which includes medical care and psycho-social support, such as counseling and play therapy. This process includes the creation of Child Friendly Spaces to help support and protect children. CMMB also help reunite these children with their families.

In April 2018 CMMB also broke ground on the construction of an operating theater, maternity ward, and blood bank at the St. Theresa Hospital in Nzara, South Sudan.

=== Zambia ===
CMMB has been working in Zambia since 1965, and today works in all 10 provinces. CMMB focuses on maternal and child health including a four-year program for prevention of mother-to-child transmission of HIV (PMTCT), increasing uptake of voluntary medical male circumcision, and HIV counseling and testing (HCT), implementing community-based HIV prevention programs and preventing and treating malaria, TB, and leprosy. CMMB promotes male involvement in antenatal clinics and responsibility for the health of the family under the Men Taking Action (MTA) model, including PMTCT, HCT services, and antiretroviral (ARV) treatment at 31 participating Church Health Institutions.

Between 2009–2012, CMMB managed the USAID-funded Malaria Communities Program under the President's Malaria Initiative (PMI) in the high transmission Luapula Province.

CMMB also works to provide safe access to clean drinking water in rural areas of Zambia. Collecting water is a task that primarily falls on women and girls, and waterborne diseases account for 80% of all illness in developing countries. Increasing accessibility to safe, clean water improves health and helps women and girls especially.

== Controversies ==
On September 20, 2019, the California Attorney General's office announced that it had secured a Cease and Desist Order and over $1 million in penalties against MAP International, Food for the Poor, and Catholic Medical Mission Board, for deceptive solicitation tactics. In a two-part decision a California administrative law judge found in favor of CMMB in part one. CMMB has filed an appeal for the second of the two-part decision.

While Charity Navigator has posted an advisory, CMMB recently received a four-star rating for the ninth consecutive year.

The organization has received a 66/100 confidence score (Donate with confidence) and a "C" transparency grade from MinistryWatch, a Christian charity watchdog organization, as of December 11, 2024

== Recognition ==
- Ranked #24 on Forbes The 100 Largest U.S. Charities 2018.
- Received Charity Navigator's "4 Star Charity" ranking in 2018, for an eighth consecutive year.
- Received #6 on Charity Navigator's "10 Best Charities Everyone's Heard Of"
- Ranked #32 on The Nonprofit Times "Top 100 2018."
- Ranked #3 on CNBC's Top 10 Charities Changing the World in 2015 and 2016.
- “BBB Accredited Charity” for 2014–2018.
- In 2006 UNAIDS recognized CMMB's HIV/AIDS programs as a “best practice” in global health.
- In 1989 won the Damien-Dutton Award that honored its work with lepers.
