= Gidel =

Town in Sudan

Gidel is a town in the Nuba Mountains of Sudan. It is the location of Mother of Mercy Hospital where Tom Catena practices.
