= Volo Volo de Boston =

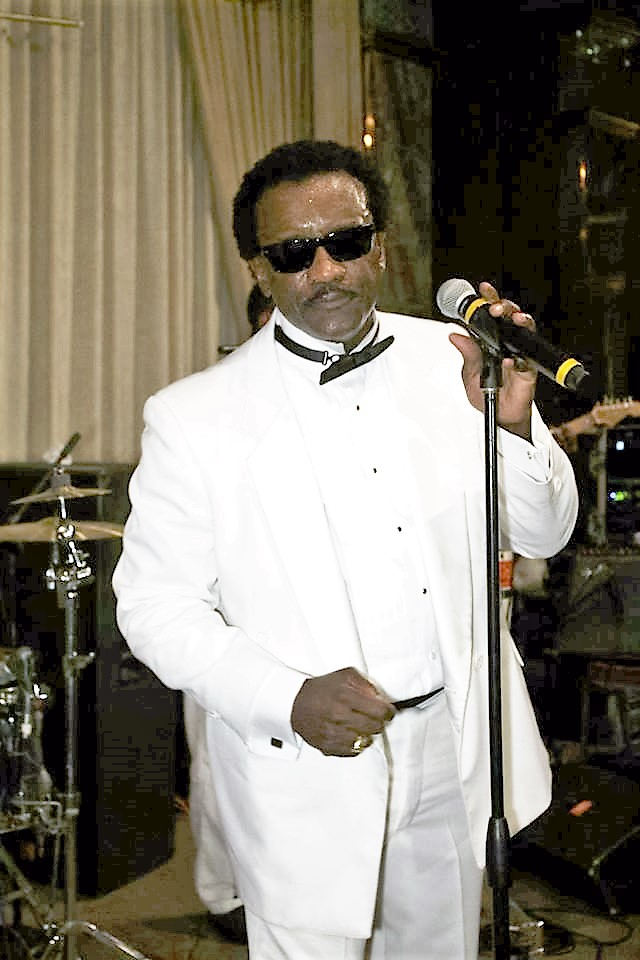
- Fequiere Lucien

Background information
- Origin: Boston, Massachusetts, U.S.
- Genres: Compas direct, mini-jazz
- Years active: 1969–present
- Members: Fequiere Lucien: Hans Felix; François St Preux; Joseph Shiller; Jean Webert Saint-Vil; Mario Registre.
- Website: volovolodeboston.com

Volo Volo de Boston (or simply Volo Volo) is a Haitian compas band based in Boston, Massachusetts.

== History ==
The band was first formed in 1969 under the name Haiti Combo. It was later changed to Volo Volo de Boston in 1972 with Eric Breneus as the vocalist approximately two years before the arrival of Ti Manno, Moise Desir, and Ricot Mazarin. In 1978, Chris Bazile and Fequiere Lucien joined the group as singers.

The group became an international success instantly after the release of their first album entitled Caressé, which earned them the title "Lover's Band" during the 70–90s while touring through Haiti, France and the French West Indies (Martinique, Guadeloupe and French Guiana), Panama, Canada and across the United States where they were well received. Volo Volo de Boston received many awards

== Band members ==
current members

- Fequiere Lucien (ht) – lead vocalist, songwriter (1978–present)
- Hans Felix – former guitarist, composer, bandleader (1972), current member
- Fritz Felix – Co-Founder of the Group, former percussionist, former manager, current advisor

former members

- Eddy Charles – 2nd guitar
- Jersaint Charles – bass
- Eddy Catan – congas
- Laud Jn Jacques – keyboard
- Carlo Sauvignon – congas
- Rico Mazarin – lead vocals
- Patrick Casseus – drums
- Roland Raymond – bass
- Paul Fleury – congas
- Henry Hans – bass
- Lesly Jean – drums
- Serge Jerome – saxophone
- David Rizza – percussion
- Wilson Pierre – congas, chant, songwriter
- Yves Leslie Orne – choral
- Joel Springer – saxophone, synthesizer
- Tom Hall – saxophone
- Gary Shore – saxophone
- Joseph Laine – backing vocals
- Frantz Rolls – guitar
- Frank London – trumpet, arranger (1978–84)
- Ti Manno – lead vocals, songwriter (deceased)
- Serge Fleury – drums (deceased)
- Eric Breneus – lead vocals (1971) (deceased)
- Chris Bazile – lead vocalist (1978–91)
- Guy Gondre – guitar, bandleader (2) (deceased)
- Emmanuel Edouard Salvant – guitar (1978–81)
- Pressoir Desruisseaux – tam-tam (1978–81)
- Jean Leon Mascary – lead vocalist (1983–2015)
- Roland Casseus – drums (1980)
- Moise Desir – alto saxophone, Caressé (deceased)
- Pierre Emmanuel Charles – alto saxophone, La Nature

== Discography ==
- Caressé (1975)
- La Nature (1979)
- Nou Nan Route (1980)
- 14 Karat Gold (1981)
- Vive Compas (1982)
- Volo Volo (1984)
- Mèt Cafou (1985)
- Volo Volo (1987)
- Volo's The Best (1990)
