= Les Frères Déjean =

Haitian kompa band

- Origin: Pétion-Ville, Port-au-Prince, Haiti,
- Genres: kompa, Mini-jazz
- Years active: 1963–present
- Past members: See Past members below

Les Frères Déjean is a kompa band formed in 1963 under the name Les Frères de Pétion-Ville by its maestro Lyonel Déjean, before being called with current name. It was not until 11 years after the creation of the group for the first album to be recorded. This album will be entitled "Haiti" and will be concentrated of hits. Other albums will follow, however, one of Déjean's milestone is certainly Bouki ac Malice, recorded in 1977 with the songs Débaké and Arrêté.

The group kept a core of members from the Déjean family, and has experienced throughout its existence, a series of departures and musicians integrations. The Déjean brothers have contributed to give to Haitian music acclaim, and led the way to a very professional way of designing musical creation in the Caribbean.

== Members ==
- André Déjean
- Camille Déjean
- Fred Déjean
- Philippe Déjean
- Ulrick Bouzi
- Hugues Isaac

Casimir

- Ernst Ramponneau
- Polynice Nozile

== Discography ==
- 1974, "Haïti".
- 1975, "Pa gain panne".
- 1976, "International".
- 1977, "Bouki ac Malice".
- 1979, "L'univers".
- 1980, "Non stop".
- 1981, "First class".
- 1982, Albums:"Sans rancune", "Malere".
- 1984, Pierrot Philibert et "Les Frères Déjean" Philibert.
- 1985, Albums: " Les Frères Déjean" (Volume 10), "Hommage aux disparus".
- 1988, Albums:" Spécial Noël", "Macaron".
- 1990, Album, Frères Déjean (Volume 14).
- 1992, "Sové peyi nou".
- 1994, "Signe:Dejean".
- 1996, "Conviction".
- 1998, "Best of Les Frères Dejean".
- 2000, "Live".
- 2001, Albums: "Sa sé Dejean", "L'univers".
