= Shleu-Shleu =

- Origin: Haiti
- Genres: kompa, Mini-jazz
- Years active: 1965–present
- Past members: See Past members below

Shleu-Shleu is a kompa band formed on 22 December 1965 in Bas Peu de Chose, Port-au-Prince by former members of the groupes Lorenceau and Memfoubins, managed by Hugues "Dada" Jackaman (or Djakaman) an Arab Haitian businessman of Palestinian origin, and directed by Tony Moïse on the ashes of Les Manfoubins created by Jean Baptiste, Jacques Vabre, Camille Philippe and Kiki Bayard and Following the demise of Les Frères Lorenceau. During their first appearance, Nemours Jean-Baptiste renamed them Mini Jazz, due to their reduced format, thus unknowingly coining the term mini-jazz, also referring to the mini-skirt fashion of the time. The new band was composed of a solo saxophonist, Tony Moise, Jean-Claude Pierre-Charles (a.k.a. Peddy) and Hans Cherubin (a.k.a. Gro Bébé) on lead vocals. After living throughout Haiti, they achieved international notoriety, and in 1970, they were hired to travel to New York City to perform at Casa Borinquen. They decided to stay in NYC. They have played in many large American cities, spreading many of the musical gems of the Haitian diaspora. In 1976, many of the original members of the band had to leave New York for several reasons. This instability created a period of decline that lasted until 1991 when Jean-Baptiste Smith decided to revive the band with the addition of new musicians, such as the talented saxophonist Evens Latortue, guitarist Eddy Altine, percussionist Joseph Savius.

== Members ==
=== Past members ===
- Eddy Altine
- Yves-Arsene Appolon
- Jacques Yves Jean-Baptiste (a.k.a. Jeanba)
- Georges Loubert Chancy
- Hans Cherubin
- Gerald Desir
- Ti Paul Edmé
- Hugues Jackaman
- Franky Jean-Baptiste
- Evens Latortue
- Joseph-Mario Mayala
- Frederic Mews
- Leon Millien
- Tony Moïse
- Jean-Claude Pierre-Charles
- Serge Rosenthal
- Fito Sadrac
- Joseph Savius
- Jean-Baptiste Smith
- Clovis St. Louis
- Antonio Saint Louis
- Jean-Michel St. Victor (a.k.a. Zouzoule)
- Jean-Ely Telfort
- Johnny-Franz Toussaint

== Discography ==
- 1967 Haiti, Mon Pays
- 1969 Tête Chauve
- 1969 Haïti, Terre De Soleil
- 1970 Cé La Ou Yé
- 1971 6ème Anniversaire
- 1972 Succès Des Shleu-Shleu A Paris
- 1973 A New York - Maestro Tony Moise
- 1973 Acé Frapé
- 1974 Toujours Le Même 4-3
- 1974 En Filant Les Aiguilles
- 1974 Grille Ta Cigarette
- 1975 Original Shleu-Shleu
- 1975 Immortel
- 1976 Le Bal Des Orchestres
- 1976 Aux Fanatiques Du Monde Entier
- 1977 Crapaud
- 1978 JSS
- 1980 Toujours Là!
- 1981 Celebration
- 1981 A La Cocoteraie
- 1982 Back To Stay
- 1983 No Money No Honey
- 1983 Succes
- 1991 Pionniers "La Tradition Continue..."
- 1994 Souvenirs
