= Mini-jazz =

Music genre

- Stylistic origins: Jazz; méringue; compas; yé-yé
- Cultural origins: Mid-1960s, Haiti

Regional scenes
- North America (esp. Haiti, French West Indies and Dominica); France; Brazil

Mini-jazz (Haitian Creole: mini-djaz) is a reduced méringue-compas band format of the mid-1960s characterized by the rock band formula of two guitars, one bass, and drum-conga-cowbell; some use an alto sax or a full horn section, while others use a keyboard, accordion or lead guitar.

== Origin ==
The 1915-34 US occupation introduced jazz music to Haiti. Local music bands were sometimes called jazz in comparison to the American big band jazz. The word "jazz" has become the equivalent of band or orchestra. The mini-jazz movement started in the mid-1960s, when small bands called mini-djaz (which grew out of Haiti's light rock and roll bands of the early 1960s that were called yeye bands) played compas featuring paired electric guitars, electric bass, drumset and other percussion, often with a saxophone. This trend, launched by Shleu-Shleu after 1965, came to include a number of groups from Port-au-Prince neighbourhoods, especially the suburb of Pétion-Ville. Tabou Combo, Les Difficiles, Les Loups Noirs, Les Frères Déjean, Les Fantaisistes de Carrefour, Bossa Combo and Les Ambassadeurs (among others) formed the core of this middle-class popular music movement. In the early 1970s, The full-horn section kadans band Exile One led by the talented Gordon Henderson was the first to use the synthesizers to their music that other young cadence or compas bands from Haiti (mini-jazz) and the French Antilles emulated in the 1970s. During the same period, popular mini-jazz groups such as Tabou Combo, Original Shleu Shleu and Volo Volo de Boston were touring throughout North American cities with musicians of the Haitian diaspora, establishing a mini-jazz scene most notably in Miami (Magnum Band) and New York City (Gypsies de Queens).
