= Tom Catena =

American physician

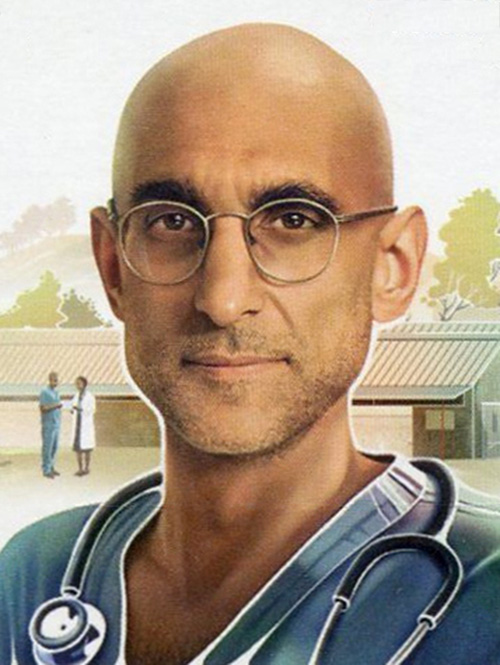
- Born: 27 April 1964 (age 62); Amsterdam, New York, U.S.
- Education: Duke University (MD); Brown University (AB)
- Occupations: Physician, surgeon, Aurora Humanitarian Initiative Chair
- Medical career
- Institutions: Mother of Mercy Hospital

Thomas Gerard Catena is an American physician who has been practising in Gidel in the Nuba Mountains of Sudan since 2008. On May 28, 2017, he was awarded the second annual Aurora Prize for Awakening Humanity, receiving a $100,000 grant and an additional one million dollars for him to distribute to three humanitarian organizations. He has been likened to the 20th-century medical missionary Albert Schweitzer. The New York Times has published instructions on how to donate to Catena. In 2018, Dr. Catena was appointed Chair of the Aurora Humanitarian Initiative.

== Early life and education ==
Born in Amsterdam, New York, United States, as the son of an Italian-American judge, Gene Catena, and his wife Nancy, Catena grew up with six brothers and a sister. His brother Paul is a Catholic priest.

Catena graduated as the salutatorian from Amsterdam High School and later with a bachelor's degree in mechanical engineering from Brown University in 1986. While at Brown, Catena played nose guard on the Brown Bears football team and was a member of the Delta Phi fraternity. In 1987, he spent a year as English teacher in Tokyo, Japan. He later received his medical degree from Duke University, on a U.S. Navy scholarship.

== Career ==
During his fourth year at Duke, Catena went on his first mission to Kenya in 1992. After graduating, he completed a one-year internship in internal medicine at the Naval Medical Center San Diego in 1993 and later joined the U.S. Navy. For the next four years, he served as a flight surgeon; in this capacity, he was stationed at the Naval Support Facility Diego Garcia from 1994 to 1995. After his discharge from the Navy in 1997, Catena began a postgraduate residency in family medicine at Union Hospital in Terre Haute, Indiana, while also participating in one-month medical mission trips to Guyana (1997) and Honduras (1998).

When he finished his residency in 1999, Catena decided to continue volunteering with the Catholic Medical Mission Board (CMMB) and spent two and a half years as a missionary doctor at Our Lady of Lourdes Mutomo Hospital in the rural settlement of Mutomo, Kenya. From 2002 until 2007, he worked as a consultant at the private St Mary's Mission Hospital in Nairobi.

=== Activities in Sudan ===
With CMMB, Catena volunteered to help the Roman Catholic Diocese of El Obeid establish the Mother of Mercy Hospital in the Nuba Mountains, which was built in 2007 by Bishop Macram Max Gassis and first launched its operations in March 2008. The region has been an area of active conflict since the mid-1980s, with a short period of peace from 2002 until early 2011, and Catena is the only surgeon for the surrounding population of 750,000 people. The hospital's catchment area covers roughly one third of South Kordofan, equivalent in size to the entire country of Austria. Patients frequently travel by foot or hitchhiking for up to a week to reach the Mother of Mercy Hospital. At any one time, it has between 300 and 450 in-patients. Patients visit the hospital for ailments varying from fractures, diarrhea, thyroid disease and cancer but also an increasing number of victims of bombing attacks or malnourishment spurred on by the war.

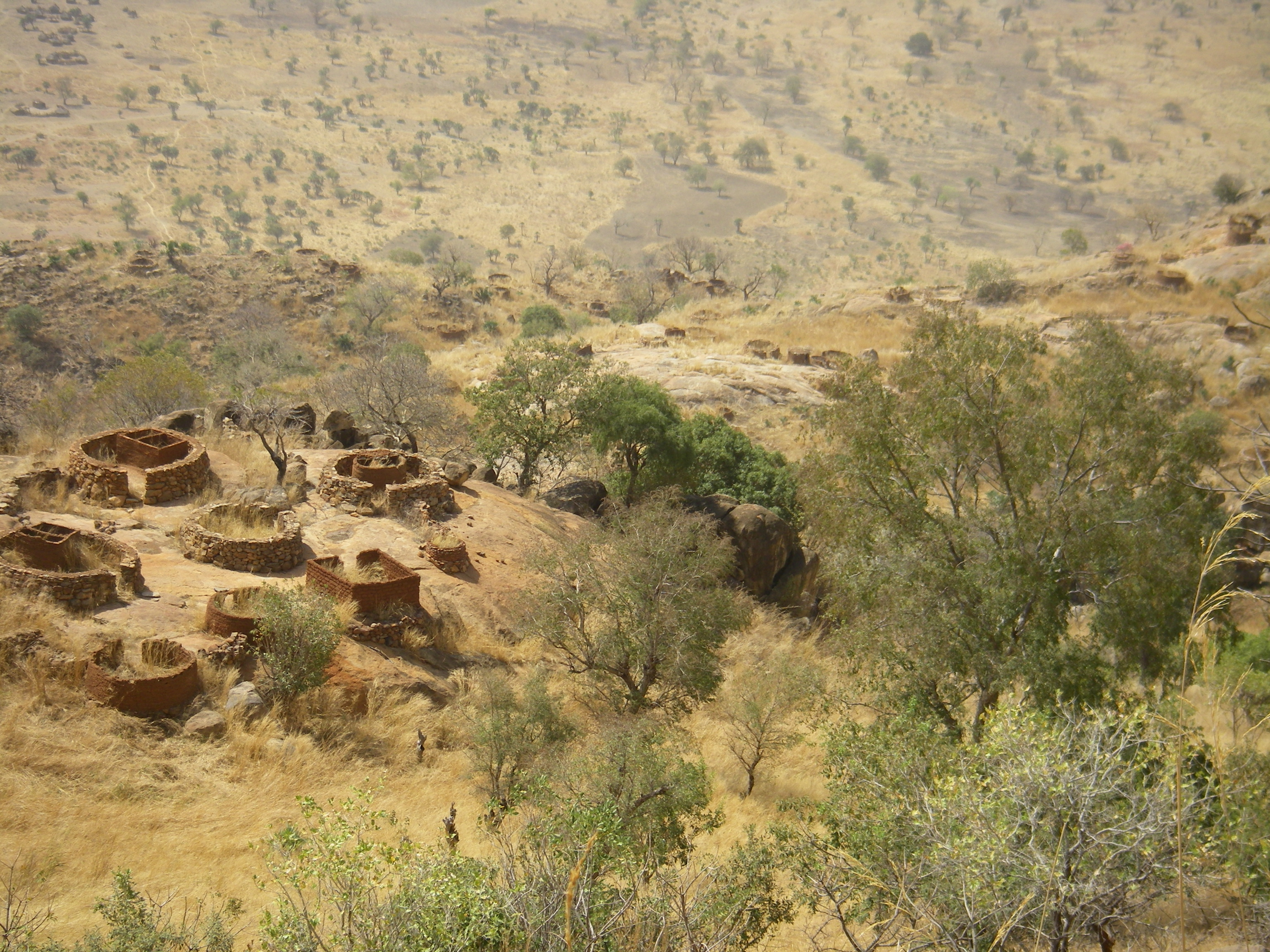
An abandoned village in the Nuba Mountains from the previous civil war. Villagers moved up in the mountains to avoid the militias.

Humanitarian aid is restricted, a ban that Catena defies. Very few NGOs still operate due to the Khartoum government's blockade. Since 2012, aid is not expressly forbidden, but it is in practice impossible as volunteers may not travel into the region. German Emergency Doctors and Samaritan's Purse had a presence as of 2013, but employed no trained medical doctors in the region. Limited by his surroundings, Catena sometimes uses decades-old treatments, and earns $350 a month while being on call 24/7. He engages the local community in the work as nurses and other assistive personnel, including through trainings in Kenya, South Sudan, and Uganda.

The Mother of Mercy Hospital was subject to bombings by Sukhoi Su-24 fighter jets operated by the Sudanese Air Force in May 2014, although at the time no one was injured. In preparation in case of bombings the compound now has a number of foxholes where patients and staff can flee for the duration.

Catena credits his Catholic faith for his work, and says he is inspired by St. Francis of Assisi. He is known by locals as "Dr. Tom" and is widely respected by the population. A local Muslim chief said of Catena, "He's Jesus Christ", owing to Catena constantly healing the sick, helping the lame walk, and making the blind see.

Since 2016, Catena has been serving on the selection committee for the annual Gerson L'Chaim Prize for Outstanding Christian Medical Mission Service. In 2018, he was appointed chair of the Aurora Humanitarian Initiative, a position he holds in addition to his activities in Sudan.

== Recognition ==
- 2024 – Theodore Roosevelt Award, National Collegiate Athletic Association
- 2022 – Honorary Doctor of Science degree, Duke University
- 2020 – Gerson L’Chaim Prize for "outstanding Christian medical missionary service", African Mission Healthcare
- 2018 – Catholics in Media Associates (CIMA) Social Justice Award
- 2017 – Aurora Prize for Awakening Humanity; besides receiving a grant in the sum of $100,000, Catena chose the following three organizations to share the prize's $1,000,000 award to continue their work:
  - African Mission Healthcare Foundation (AMHF), USA
  - Catholic Medical Mission Board (CMMB), USA
  - Aktion Canchanabury, Germany
- 2017 – Honorary Doctorate, Yerevan State Medical University
- 2016 – Honorary Doctor of Medical Science degree, Brown University
- 2015 – Time 100
- 2015 – Gold Medal of the National Football Foundation (NFF)

== Personal life ==
Since May 2016, Catena has been married to his wife Nasima, a nurse. They have a son.
