= MAP International =

Christian organization

MAP International is a Christian nonprofit organization based out of Brunswick, Georgia. Their mission is to provide medicines and health supplies to those in need around the world.

== History ==
=== Establishment ===
MAP International was founded in 1954 by J. Raymond Knighton, the first Executive Director of the Christian Medical Society, now known as the Christian Medical and Dental Associations (CMDA). Knighton had heard reports of missionary doctors in remote parts of the world lacking necessary medicines and health supplies to adequately treat their patients. He became passionate about this need and shared it with nearly everyone he met. One day, a truck carrying 11 tons of pharmaceuticals from the Schering Drug Company arrived at Knighton's Chicago office. Art Larson, an executive at Schering, had heard of Knighton and saw an opportunity to put the extra stock of medicines to good use. With that, the Christian Medical Society launched the outreach that later became MAP International. Knighton began by matching up excess pharmaceuticals with doctors in impoverished countries, and the mission has grown since then. Knighton served as the president of MAP International until 1980 and died in 2003 at the age of 81.

=== Current CEO Steve Stirling ===
Steve Stirling has served as the President and CEO since 2014. As a young child living in post-war Korea in the 1960s, Steve suffered a life-altering bout with polio – a disease that wreaked havoc on his body and ostracized him from society, ultimately leading to separation from his family. This disease and its consequences could have been prevented with a vaccine that costs merely a few cents. When Steve was only 5 years old, his father dropped him and his sister off at an orphanage, where they spent the next 5 years before being adopted by a couple in the U.S. Steve eventually graduated from Cornell University with a degree in Agricultural Economics and earned his MBA in Marketing and Finance from Northwestern University. Prior to joining MAP International, Steve held executive-level positions with nonprofits including Child Fund International, Heifer International, ChildHelp, and WorldVision US, and with corporations including Bristol-Myers Squibb, Conagra Foods, AmeriTrade, and Univera Life Sciences.

== Financials and Credentials ==
In 2019, MAP delivered medicines and health supplies to 13.3 million people in 98 countries – all with a staff of fewer than 40 people.

== Credibility ==
Forbes, Inc. recognizes MAP International as the #37 Largest U.S. Charity. BBB lists MAP International as an accredited charity, meaning it meets the standards in terms of governance, measuring effectiveness, finances, and fund raising and information. CNBC named MAP International #2 on their list of Top-Ten Charities Changing the World in 2015. Popline points out that some health workers have biases against working with faith-based programs, but that the strong financial ratings and merits of the MAP International program should dispel these biases. It also discusses the financial benefits of FBOs in relation to “their ability to leverage volunteer work with minimal effort.”

A 2008 complaint from the California Attorney General claimed that, under the Generally Accepted Accounting Principles (GAAP), "charities can only claim 'fair market value' of gifts in kind" in a "principal market" or "most advantageous market," to which the charity must have access in valuing the asset (in this case, the pharmaceuticals). The Attorney General's order alleged that MAP International claimed the US value of the pharmaceuticals, rather than their value in the countries to which they were destined, even though the drugs were restricted from use in the US. The matter was ultimately settled and dismissed.

A judge later found the entire premise of the Attorney General’s action to be unconstitutional.

== Current projects ==
=== Disaster relief ===
MAP International works to respond to both natural and conflict related emergencies. MAP International provides medical relief shipments to those in need and monitors the health of those in need, if an emergency occurs in a country MAP International has instituted a country presence it implements a country office response in which MAP International staff mobilize to provide health care, and utilizes community based disaster mitigation to train community members to manage the effects of the disaster and promote health in the wake of the disaster on a long-term scale. Current MAP International disaster relief programs include Typhoon Haiyan: Philippines, Cyclone Phailin, Oklahoma Tornado, and Syrian Refugee relief. MAP International has responded to Typhoon Haiyan by shipping $4.2 million in medicines and supplies, and is still in the process of responding by providing emergency health care kits to victims. MAP International recognizes its partners for their integral role in efficiently distributing donated medicines and supplies, and states the difficulties they have encountered in getting the medicines to the victims. For example, all of the medicine shipments in Leyte Island were washed away when the typhoon hit that area. In response to the detrimental effects of Cyclone Phailin, MAP International is providing India with temporary shelter structures, food, medicine, and cooking utensils. MAP International has responded to the Oklahoma Tornado by donating over $127,000 of supplies to their partner, Convoy of Hope, in Oklahoma. The U.S. Chamber of Commerce Foundation also mentions MAP International's affiliation with Abbott in response to the tornado. In response to the civil war in Syria, MAP International has sent two shipments to refugees, and is still responding by preparing a third shipment to send when sufficient funding is acquired. The Saporta Report outlines MAP International's involvement in Syrian Refugee Crisis relief efforts, and briefly describes the cost of these emergency aid kits.

=== Transformational missions ===
A program to turn short-term missions into long-term local health programs.

==== Short-term missions ====
Medical or non-medical volunteers from the United States help with an existing program in a Total Health Village, assisted by members of MAP International.

==== Curriculum-based field study ====
Short-term field study for students integrated into the curriculum of a scholastic establishment for credit within the degree areas of health or international development.

==== MAP fellowship ====
Opportunity for fourth year medical students to work during an 8-week program in a MAP-approved hospital or clinic, usually in Kenya, Uganda, Ecuador, Honduras, Bolivia, Indonesia, Liberia, Cote d’Ivore, or Ghana.

==== Partnership opportunities ====
Volunteers are educated about a MAP Internal program and work with members of an underserved community to explore ways to collaborate with MAP International programs.

==== Disaster relief response ====
Emergency aid teams from the United States respond quickly to help affected communities by implementing disaster management strategies and training community members to sustain these programs on a long-term basis.

=== Global essential medicines and supplies (GEMS) ===
MAP International contributes over $250 million inexpensive bought and donated medicines and supplies to philanthropic relief organizations helping underserved communities each year. The medicines provided are from the Essential Drug List (EDL).

=== Maternal and child health ===
MAP International has implemented programs in Ecuador, Uganda, Kenya, and Bolivia. These programs focus on different topics including perinatal care, training health promoters, preventing sexual abuse, providing rehabilitation for victims of sexual abuse, and education.

=== Neglected tropical diseases ===
MAP International has implemented programs in Kenya, Uganda, Ecuador, Honduras, Bolivia, Indonesia, Liberia, Cote d’Ivore, and Ghana to treat and prevent Guinea worm, Buruli ulcer, Leprosy, Yaws, Lymphatic filariasis, Chagas Disease, Soil-transmitted Helminthes, and Rabies. Programs to eradicate these diseases include vaccinations, education, water and sanitation efforts, awareness building, community mobilization, and operations.

=== Total health village ===
MAP International has implemented programs in 65 villages throughout Kenya, Uganda, Ecuador, Honduras, Bolivia, Indonesia, Liberia, Cote d’Ivore, and Ghana. This program focuses on local solutions to problems within the cultural context of the community and is designed to give the community command of the improvement plan. Community members take part in many aspects of other current projects listed such as water and sanitation efforts and disease treatment, as well as working to settle conflict, train local health promoters, and facilitate economic security.

=== Water and sanitation ===
Water and Sanitation are aspects assimilated into all MAP International programs because of the significant impact they have on preventing disease and promoting other facets of Total Health. Water and Sanitation efforts involve building separate waste and clean drinking structures, providing water filters to communities, and establishing Community Led Total Sanitation programs. MAP International utilizes a sweat equity design to implement Sawyer water filters in underserved communities and implements a small-scale demonstration with the help of a few members in the community before introducing water sanitation efforts on a large-scale throughout the village. Sawyer attests to the integral role MAP International has played in distributing hundreds water filters to communities. Community Led Total Sanitation programs are designed to educate and empower local community members to make their village a more sanitary and healthy environment through education about the negative health effects of drinking unclean water and the importance of separating human waste structures and drinking water structures.
