= Rashy K =

Swedish musical artist

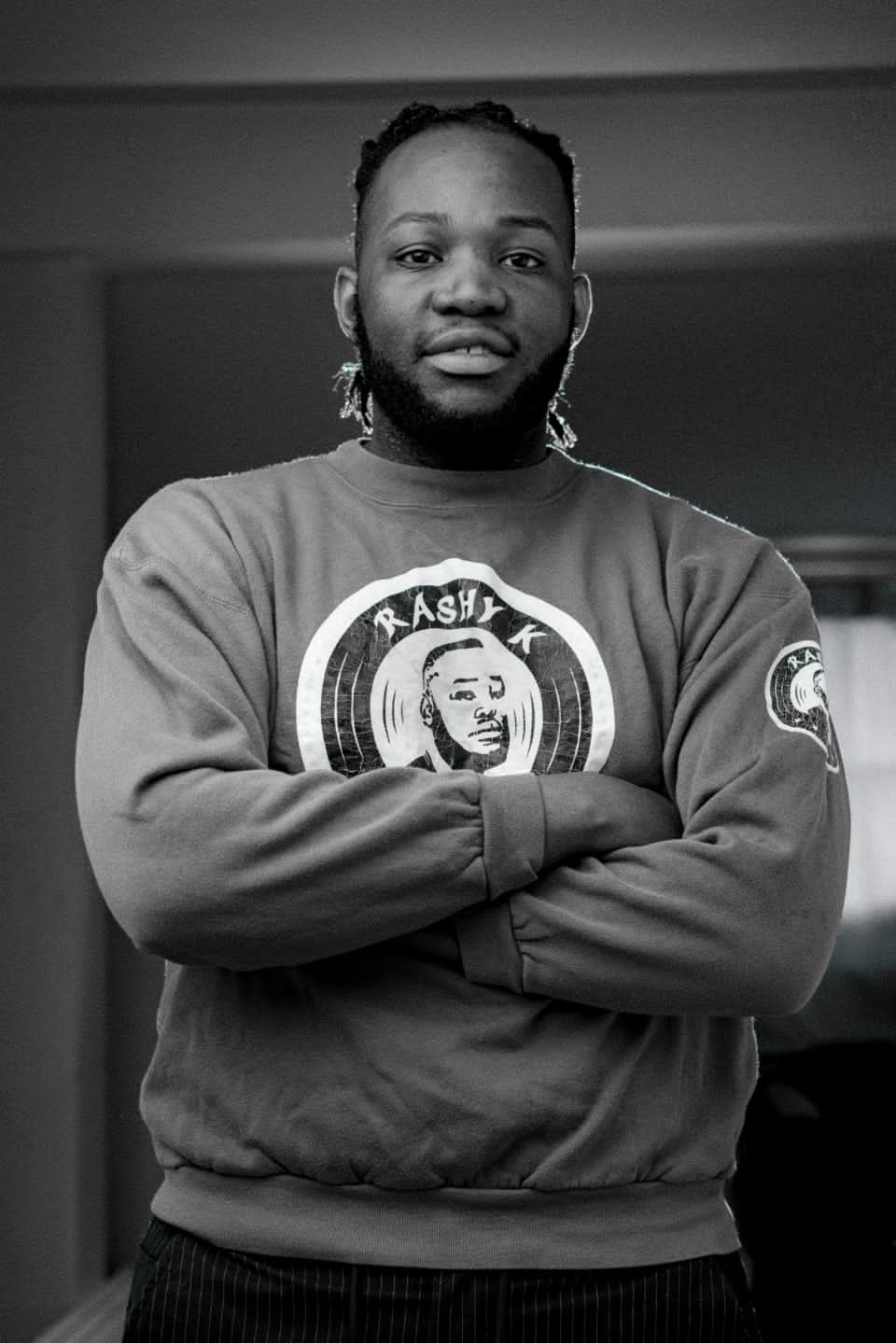

Background information
- Born: Rashid Kibirige Ssebunya; 28 March 1993 (age 33); Kampala, Uganda
- Origin: Makindye, Uganda
- Genres: Zouk, Ragga, Afropop, world music
- Occupations: Singer, songwriter
- Instrument: Vocal
- Years active: 2009–present
- Label: Rush Gang Affiliates

Rashid Kibirige Ssebunya (born 28 March 1993), simply known as Rashy K is a Swedish musical artist, singer, and songwriter.

== Music career ==
=== Studio albums ===
List of Studio Albums with selected details
Title	Details
Uganda Sweden Connect	Released: 31 August 2015; Label: Rush Gang Affiliates; Formats: Digital download
Good Vibes	Released: 6 May 2018; Label: Rush Gang Affiliates; Formats: Digital download
Celebration	Released: 2020; Label: Rush Gang Affiliates; Formats: Digital download

Rashy K released his first song "Nkulage" in 2009. Yenze featuring Buchaman was his first Uganda release. Nuffstyle featuring Yungmulo was his breakthrough song in 2018.

== Discography ==
- Nkulage 2009
- Boom Boom 2012
- Yenze 2013
- Da Love 2015
- It`s a Party 2019
- Miss WorldWide 2017
- Good Vibes 2018
- My Gal 2018
- Emunyeenye 2018
- Temptation 2019
- Onkubye 2018
- Nuff Stuff 2018
- In My Life 2019
- Mu Maaso 2019
- I`m Blessed 2020
- I`m Ready 2020
- East African Girl 2020
- Stamina 2020
- Best Friend 2020
- Beautiful Interlude 2020

== Personal life ==
Rashy K was born in Kampala. He studied at Hilltop Academy, Shimoni Demonstration School but was later taken to Sweden.

== Endorsement ==
In 2021, Rashy K signed with NBA 2K Sports, an American computer game publisher, to use "I’m Ready" song as a soundtrack in NBA 2021 Next Generation computer game. He also serves as the ambassador of DMG EDUCATION (a music school) in Sweden

== Honors ==
Year	Award	Category	Nominee(s)	Result	Ref.
2016	Uganda Hiphop Awards	Best Diaspora Act	Rashy K	Nominated	
2016	Afro Crown Awards	Best Hip Hop artist	Rashy K	Won	
2019	Hipipo Music Awards	Best Act Diaspora	Rashy K	Nominated	
