= 2003 in music =

This is a list of notable events in music that took place in the year 2003.

== Specific locations ==
- 2003 in British music
- 2003 in Irish music
- 2003 in Nordic music
- 2003 in South Korean music

== Specific genres ==
- 2003 in classical music
- 2003 in country music
- 2003 in heavy metal music
- 2003 in hip-hop
- 2003 in jazz
- 2003 in Latin music
- 2003 in progressive rock

== Events ==
=== January–February ===
- January 6 – The annual Park Lane Group Young Artists festival of contemporary music opens with two concerts in the Purcell Room at the Southbank Centre, London. The first concert, given by the Gallimaufry Ensemble, includes the premiere of a new wind quintet by 23-year-old Benjamin Wallfisch; the second concert features solo bass clarinettist Sarah Watts, who premieres Marc Yeats Vox for solo bass clarinet and Michael Smetanin's Ladder of Escape for bass clarinet with prerecorded ensemble of six bass and two contrabass clarinets.
- January 7 – The Philip on Film Live festival (until January 11) opens at the Barbican Centre, London, featuring films with music by Philip Glass performed live by the Philip Glass Ensemble, conducted by Michael Riesman.
- January 9 – The Vienna Philharmonic belatedly announce that violist Ursula Plaichinger has become the first official female member of the orchestra, 158 years after their founding and six years after they have been forced to allow women to audition, under threat of having their state subsidies stopped. At the same time, it is disclosed that orchestra boss Clemens Hellsberg has formally banned Plaichinger from giving interviews to the press.
- January 10
  - Andrew Lack, former chief of NBC news, is named the new head of Sony's music division, to the surprise of the music industry, because he had no previous experience of the record industry. He replaced Tommy Mottola, who resigned the previous day amidst reports of friction with higher Sony executives over huge financial losses in the music division.
  - Following an investigation by The International Federation of the Phonographic Industry and London detectives, police raids in the UK and the Netherlands recover 500 original Beatles studio tapes, recorded during the Let It Be sessions. Five people are arrested. The tapes have been used for bootleg releases for years.
- January 13 – The Who guitarist Pete Townshend is arrested by British police on suspicion of possessing and making indecent images of children and of incitement to distribute them. Townshend claims in a statement that he did not download any such images and accessed Web sites advertising child pornography because he was researching material for his autobiography, which will include passages about his abusive childhood.
- January 17–February 2 – The Big Day Out festival takes place in Australia and New Zealand, headlined by Foo Fighters, Jane's Addiction and Underworld.
- January 18
  - The Indian Air Force band, the Air Warriors, play a concert in the Homi Baba Auditorium in Colaba (Mumbai), which included Muthuswami Dikshitar's Vathapiganapathi in a version combining military band with traditional Carnatic instruments.
  - A two-day festival of the music of Mark-Anthony Turnage is given at the Barbican Centre, London, with three world premieres and chamber concerts by the Nash Ensemble and the Birmingham Contemporary Music Group.
- January 22 – Nikolaus Harnoncourt cancels a European tour after being ordered by his doctors to take a two-month rest.
- February 3
  - Police respond to a 911 phone call from one of Phil Spector's neighbors and discover the body of actress Lana Clarkson, with a gunshot wound, at Spector's his home in Alhambra, California. Spector is arrested on suspicion of murder.
  - The Martin Bashir television film Living with Michael Jackson premieres on ITV in the UK. It airs on ABC in the US three days later. A total of 53 million viewers in the two countries watch the special.
- February 8 – Avril Lavigne scores her third #1 single "I'm with You", making her the second artist in history to have three consecutive #1 songs from a debut album in the Billboard Mainstream Top 40.
- February 18 – Simon & Garfunkel reunited for three songs at the ABC's Good Morning America.
- February 20 – The Station nightclub fire: Fire engulfs a Rhode Island nightclub during a fireworks display which was part of the performance by rock band Great White. The fire quickly spreads across the ceiling, filling the building with thick, black smoke, killing 100 people and injuring 160 others as audience members rush for the exits. Many people are missing for some time, including Great White guitarist Ty Longley, who is later confirmed to be dead.
- February 23 – New York City is the site of The 45th Annual Grammy Awards, featuring Nickelback, No Doubt, Foo Fighters, Beyoncé and other performers. Norah Jones wins a total of six awards, including all four in the General field.
- February 24 – Robert Trujillo joins Metallica.

=== March–April ===
- March 3 – Avril Lavigne kicks off her first headlining tour the "Try To Shut Me Up Tour".
- March 10
  - Johnny Cash is admitted to Baptist Hospital in Nashville, Tennessee to undergo treatment for pneumonia.
  - The Dixie Chicks unleash a firestorm of controversy at a concert in London when lead singer Natalie Maines announces to the audience that "just so you know, we're ashamed the president of the United States is from Texas". The group is dropped from radio playlists all over the United States and receives death threats as a result.
- March 21 – Ex-Neighbours star Delta Goodrem releases her debut album Innocent Eyes which became Australia's monster smash hit of 2003 and included the releases of the new singles "Born to Try" and "Lost Without You".
- March 24 – Meteora by Linkin Park debuts at number one on the Billboard 200 album chart.
- March 25 – Céline Dion begins A New Day..., her Las Vegas residency show. It would run for almost five years and over 700 shows.
- April 1 – Dozens of fans walk out during a Pearl Jam concert when lead singer Eddie Vedder makes comments opposing the Iraq war and derogatory remarks about U.S. President George W. Bush. Other audience members boo and shout at Vedder telling him to "shut up." Vedder attempts to calm the crowd by adding "just to clarify... we support the troops."
- April 4 – Alex Katunich quits Incubus.
- April 16 – Luther Vandross suffers a severe stroke at his home in New York City. He emerges from a coma seven weeks later.
- April 21 – S Club announce live on stage at London's Docklands Arena that they've decided to split up after five years together. Their final single, "Say Goodbye", enters the chart at #2 a month after the announcement. Rachel Stevens from the group launched her successful solo career shortly afterwards with the song "Sweet Dreams My L.A. Ex".
- April 26-27 – The Coachella Valley Music and Arts Festival takes place in California. Headlined by Beastie Boys and Red Hot Chili Peppers, the lineup also features Queens of the Stone Age, Iggy and the Stooges, Ben Harper & the Innocent Criminals, Blur, The White Stripes, Sonic Youth, Black Eyed Peas, Interpol, the Mars Volta, N.E.R.D. and Primal Scream.
- April 28 – Apple Inc. opens the iTunes Music Store, offering 200,000 songs for download at a cost of 99 cents each. More than 1 million songs are sold in the store's first week.

=== May–June ===
- May 7 – Pete Townshend is cleared of the charges stemming from his arrest in January on suspicion of possessing child pornography, but is formally cautioned and placed on the sex offenders register for five years.
- May 19 – The former TV channel MuchMusic USA relaunches as Fuse.
- May 21 – Ruben Studdard wins the second season of American Idol, edging Clay Aiken.
- May 24
  - Turkish singer Sertab Erener wins the Eurovision Song Contest, held in Riga, Latvia, with the song "Everyway That I Can". It is the last time that the contest is a one-night event.
  - After a 40-year wait, Russian fans of The Beatles finally get to see former Beatle Paul McCartney perform on their soil, on the Red Square in Moscow.
- May 31-June 1 – The inaugural Download Festival takes place at Donington Park in Leicestershire, England. Iron Maiden and Audioslave headline the main stage, the latter acting as replacements for original headliners Limp Bizkit. The Scuzz Stage is headlined by A and NOFX.
- June 14
  - David Del Tredici's Wondrous the Merge for string quartet and narrator, based on a homoerotic poem by James Broughton, makes its controversial debut at the Great Lakes Chamber Music Festival.
  - Henry Ranta quits Soilwork.
  - Justin Timberlake and Christina Aguilera kicked off their summer Justified & Stripped Tour.
  - Los Angeles, California radio station KROQ-FM airs the 11th Annual of the Weenie Roast show with AFI, The Ataris, Blur, Chevelle, Deftones, Finch, Foo Fighters, Godsmack, Good Charlotte, Hot Hot Heat, Interpol, Jane's Addiction, Less Than Jake, Liam Lynch, Staind, Sum 41, Thrice, Transplants, The Used, The White Stripes and Pete Yorn.
- June 20
  - Beyoncé releases her No.1 debut solo album Dangerously in Love, which would earn her 5 Grammys in a single night. It also spawned two No.1 singles in the US and has sold 11 million copies to date.
  - Nick Oshiro replaces Ken Jay in Static-X.
- June 24 – Taylor Swift sign to RCA Records.
- June 27–29 – In the Glastonbury Festival, U.K., headline acts include David Gray, R.E.M., Primal Scream, Morcheeba, The Flaming Lips, Radiohead, Super Furry Animals, Lamb, Macy Gray, Feeder, Manic Street Preachers, Moby and Doves. The weather is mostly dry and the festival deemed a success from both a security and entertainment viewpoint by Michael Eavis.

=== July–August ===
- July 2
  - A-Teens and many others perform at the Stockholm Pride festival.
  - Delta Goodrem is diagnosed with Hodgkin's Disease.
- July 5 – Lollapalooza returns after a six-year absence from the music festival circuit. Jane's Addiction, Audioslave, Incubus and Queens of the Stone Age are among the featured acts.
- July 11 – Judas Priest announces that Rob Halford has rejoined the band, with a reunion tour to follow in 2004.
- July 14 – The Eurodance and alternative rock musician Lynda Thomas makes her last public appearance before suddenly leaving the music industry and public life.
- July 19–20 – The Splendour in the Grass music festival takes place in Byron Bay, Australia, headlined by Powderfinger and Coldplay.
- July 20 – An auto accident in Oregon, United States, kills three of the four members of The Exploding Hearts, ending the band after just one album.
- July 30 – The Rolling Stones, AC/DC, Rush, The Guess Who and others headline a benefit concert in Toronto, Ontario, Canada, to prove that the city is safe from SARS. With 450 thousand spectators, it is the largest concert in Canadian history.
- August 19 – Jessica Simpson releases her third studio album In This Skin. The album would later go triple platinum in the U.S. and would produce the hit single "With You".
- August 28 – Madonna sparks media controversy by kissing popstars Britney Spears and Christina Aguilera at the 2003 MTV Video Music Awards. The situation even ignited a quick war of words between Britney Spears and Christina Aguilera over the kiss.

=== September–October ===
- September 15 – Billy Corgan announces that Zwan has broken up.
- September 16
  - Ryan Malcolm wins the first season of Canadian Idol.
  - David Bowie releases his twenty-third studio album Reality. The album would be Bowie's last for roughly a decade, with Bowie silently and gradually withdrawing into seclusion following an onstage heart attack the following year.
- September 22 – Max Cavalera & Gloria Cavalera fire Marcello D. Rapp causing Roy Mayorga & Mike Doling to leave the band Soulfly in protest.
- October – Indie/Rock band Conway wins the National "Battle of the Bands" Competition at the Fountain Pub in Tottenham, London, UK. The Norfolk, UK, band consists of Chris Burgoyne (vocals), Andrew Norman (lead guitar / vocals), Tristan McKelvey (guitar), Leon Chapman (bass) and Peter Rednall (drums).
- October 4 – Bruce Springsteen and the E Street Band's The Rising Tour concludes after 120 shows over 14 months, with record-setting sales in U.S. stadiums during the summer and early autumn.
- October 15 – A two-week-long international conference, "Fuori tempo, dire, fare, sentire la musica oggi", opens in Genoa, Italy, bringing together performers, composers, scholars and administrators from classical, folk and popular music, with a keynote address by Charles Rosen. Featured participants include Nuria Schoenberg (daughter of Arnold Schoenberg and widow of Luigi Nono); musicologist James Harrison; opera conductor Roberto Abbado; violinist Ivry Gitlis; composers Salvatore Sciarrino, Lorenzo Ferrero and Andrea Liberovici; poet Edoardo Sanguineti; popular singer-songwriters Teresa De Sio, Gianna Nannini and Gino Paoli; rock and jazz artists Peppe Servalo and Peppe D'Argenzio of the Piccola Orchestra Avion Travel; and administrators Anna Cammarano (director of classical music at RAI Trade), Gennaro di Benedetto (superintendent of the Teatro Carlo Felice in Genoa) and Joseph Hussek (director of the artistic programme at the Salzburg Festival).
- October 16 – Simon & Garfunkel begin their "Old Friends" U.S. reunion tour, twenty years after their 1983 world tour.
- October 20 – Britney Spears releases the first single, "Me Against the Music", featuring American singer-songwriter Madonna, from her upcoming album In the Zone, marketed as a comeback single in the US; it goes on to be an international success, reaching the top three in several countries.
- October 21 – Delta Goodrem wins 7 ARIA Awards and defeats Amiel's "Lovesong" for and a Gold ARIA for Single of the Year, Born to Try. ARIAs host Rove McManus announced that John Farnham will raise the very loud speakers to 1985/1986's "You're the Voice" after being inducted into the ARIA Hall of Fame.
- October 29 – A legal version of the Napster file sharing network relaunches as a pay service, offering song downloads for 99 cents apiece or $9.99 for unlimited listening.

=== November–December ===
- November 6 – Marco Aro vacates his vocalist position in The Haunted. The band rehires their first vocalist, Peter Dolving.
- November 20 – Michael Jackson is arrested on charges of child molestation. The singer faced similar charges in 1993 that were dropped after an out-of-court financial settlement was reached with the family of a boy. In light of the new accusations, the television network CBS chooses to pull the scheduled November 26 airing of a one-hour television special intended to promote Jackson's new greatest hits album, Number Ones.
- November 22 – The band Five Iron Frenzy plays its last show at the Fillmore Auditorium in Denver.
- December 6
  - Elvis Costello and Diana Krall are married in a private ceremony at Elton John's estate in England.
  - P-Funk founder George Clinton is arrested and charged with drug possession in Tallahassee, Florida.
- December 8 – Ozzy Osbourne is rushed into emergency surgery after having a serious accident riding an all-terrain vehicle on the grounds of his English estate. Osbourne broke his collarbone, eight ribs and a vertebra in his neck.
- December 12 – Mick Jagger is knighted for services to music by the Prince of Wales (now Charles III) at Buckingham Palace.
- December 13-14 – The Los Angeles, California radio station KROQ-FM airs the 14th Annual of the Acoustic Christmas show with AFI, Blink-182, Brand New, Chevelle, The Distillers, Jane's Addiction, Jet, Korn, Linkin Park, The Offspring, P.O.D., Pennywise, Puddle of Mudd, Rancid, Staind, 311, Thrice and Trapt.
- December 30-31 – The New Year's Eve Falls Festival in Australia, traditionally held in Lorne, Victoria, holds events in both Lorne and Marion Bay, Tasmania, at the same time. The same artists perform at both events, alternating between the two venues each night.

== Classical music ==
- Victoria Borisova-Ollas – The Kingdom of Silence
- Haflidi Hallgrímsson – Cello Concerto
- Wojciech Kilar – Symphony No. 3 ("September Symphony")
- Steve Reich – Cello Counterpoint
- Ned Rorem – Mallet Concerto.
- Kaija Saariaho – Quatre instants
- John Tavener – The Veil of the Temple
- John Williams
  - Horn Concerto
  - Soundings

== Opera ==
- Deborah Drattell – Nicholas and Alexandra
- Philip Glass – The Sound of a Voice
- Osvaldo Golijov – Ainadamar
- Rachel Portman – The Little Prince
- Jörg Widmann – Das Gesicht im Spiegel

== Bands formed ==
- See Musical groups established in 2003

== Bands reformed ==
- The Stooges
- Edge of Sanity

== Bands disbanded ==
- See Category:Musical groups disestablished in 2003

== Albums released ==
=== January–March ===
| Date | | Album | Artist | Notes |
|---|---|---|---|---|
| J A N U A R Y | 7 | Hate Crew Deathroll | Children of Bodom | - |
| J A N U A R Y | 7 | Inertia | The Exies | - |
| J A N U A R Y | 7 | Living Out Loud | Aaron Lines | - |
| J A N U A R Y | 10 | To Be Continued... | Stefanie Sun | - |
| J A N U A R Y | 13 | Acapulco | Therese Grankvist | - |
| J A N U A R Y | 13 | Le Chemin | Kyo | - |
| J A N U A R Y | 13 | Epica | Kamelot | - |
| J A N U A R Y | 13 | Jaime | Jaime Jamgochian | - |
| J A N U A R Y | 13 | Selling Live Water | Sole | - |
| J A N U A R Y | 13 | Up All Night | The Waifs | - |
| J A N U A R Y | 14 | Cabinet | Spawn of Possession | - |
| J A N U A R Y | 14 | Pain to Kill | Terri Clark | - |
| J A N U A R Y | 14 | Rusty Nails | Jackie Greene | - |
| J A N U A R Y | 14 | What You Want Is Now | House of Heroes | - |
| J A N U A R Y | 15 | American Duet | Marcus Hummon | - |
| J A N U A R Y | 16 | Ai no Poltergeist | Mayumi Kojima | - |
| J A N U A R Y | 16 | All About Love | Steven Curtis Chapman | - |
| J A N U A R Y | 16 | Threatcon Delta | Neil Turbin | - |
| J A N U A R Y | 17 | 25 Miles to Kissimmee | Fool's Garden | - |
| J A N U A R Y | 17 | Chasing Your Tomorrows | Candîce | - |
| J A N U A R Y | 17 | Deep Cuts | The Knife | - |
| J A N U A R Y | 17 | Jade-2 Special Edition | Jade Kwan | - |
| J A N U A R Y | 18 | Rock the Block | Krokus | - |
| J A N U A R Y | 19 | Summer 2003 | Anthrax | EP |
| J A N U A R Y | 20 | 6 | Supersilent | - |
| J A N U A R Y | 20 | Dark Island | Pram | - |
| J A N U A R Y | 20 | Masterplan | Masterplan | - |
| J A N U A R Y | 20 | We Learned By Watching | Aberdeen City | - |
| J A N U A R Y | 20 | Woodsmoke | Nest | - |
| J A N U A R Y | 21 | Live in Japan 2002 | Simple Plan | Live |
| J A N U A R Y | 21 | Long Knives Drawn | Rainer Maria | - |
| J A N U A R Y | 21 | Music in High Places | Unwritten Law | Live |
| J A N U A R Y | 21 | The Networks, the Circuits, the Streams, the Harmonies | Burnside Project | - |
| J A N U A R Y | 21 | One Bedroom | The Sea and Cake | - |
| J A N U A R Y | 21 | Simple Things Remixes | Zero 7 | Remix |
| J A N U A R Y | 21 | Solo Star | Solange | US |
| J A N U A R Y | 21 | Such Great Heights | The Postal Service | EP |
| J A N U A R Y | 21 | Ultimate Yanni | Yanni | Compilation |
| J A N U A R Y | 21 | A Woman Like Me | Bettye LaVette | - |
| J A N U A R Y | 22 | Life Is... | Ken Hirai | - |
| J A N U A R Y | 22 | Shura bayashi | Ningen Isu | - |
| J A N U A R Y | 22 | Tomorrow Today | Fake? | - |
| J A N U A R Y | 25 | The Heartless Control Everything | Chiodos | EP |
| J A N U A R Y | 27 | Elements Pt. 1 | Stratovarius | - |
| J A N U A R Y | 27 | Waste 'Em All | Municipal Waste | Debut |
| J A N U A R Y | 27 | Other People's Songs | Erasure | Covers album |
| J A N U A R Y | 28 | Alive Again | Nightingale | - |
| J A N U A R Y | 28 | ...And Don't Forget to Breathe | A Static Lullaby | - |
| J A N U A R Y | 28 | Great Lake Swimmers | Great Lake Swimmers | - |
| J A N U A R Y | 28 | The Heat Death of the Universe | Off Minor | - |
| J A N U A R Y | 28 | Loose Fur | Loose Fur | - |
| J A N U A R Y | 28 | Mary Star of the Sea | Zwan | - |
| J A N U A R Y | 28 | Master and Everyone | Bonnie "Prince" Billy | - |
| J A N U A R Y | 28 | New Arrival | A*Teens | - |
| J A N U A R Y | 28 | New Year's Revolution | Project Rocket | - |
| J A N U A R Y | 28 | Playin' Around | Play | - |
| J A N U A R Y | 28 | The Raven | Lou Reed | - |
| J A N U A R Y | 28 | This Is It: The Best of Faith No More | Faith No More | Compilation |
| J A N U A R Y | 29 | Curved Music II | Joe Hisaishi | - |
| J A N U A R Y | 29 | Valenti | BoA | Japan |
| F E B R U A R Y | 3 | The Stars at Saint Andrea | Devics | - |
| F E B R U A R Y | 3 | Cedars | Clearlake | - |
| F E B R U A R Y | 3 | Disco 3 | Pet Shop Boys | Compilation |
| F E B R U A R Y | 3 | Enemy of the Enemy | Asian Dub Foundation | - |
| F E B R U A R Y | 3 | Nocturama | Nick Cave and the Bad Seeds | - |
| F E B R U A R Y | 3 | Here to There | DJ Spinna | - |
| F E B R U A R Y | 4 | The All-American Rejects | The All-American Rejects | DreamWorks re-release |
| F E B R U A R Y | 4 | Boomslang | Johnny Marr and the Healers | - |
| F E B R U A R Y | 4 | Canterbury Fayre 2001 | Hawkwind | Live |
| F E B R U A R Y | 4 | Chasing Daylight | Sister Hazel | - |
| F E B R U A R Y | 4 | The Dreamer | Blake Shelton | - |
| F E B R U A R Y | 4 | Halloween | Frank Zappa | Live 1978 |
| F E B R U A R Y | 4 | Keith Sweat Live | Keith Sweat | Live |
| F E B R U A R Y | 4 | Icarus | The Forms | - |
| F E B R U A R Y | 4 | Let Go | Nada Surf | - |
| F E B R U A R Y | 4 | Love | The Juliana Theory | - |
| F E B R U A R Y | 4 | We Sing the Body Electric | Sincebyman | - |
| F E B R U A R Y | 4 | Wormwood | Moe | - |
| F E B R U A R Y | 5 | Makking Gold 1 | Maki Goto | - |
| F E B R U A R Y | 6 | Get Rich or Die Tryin' | 50 Cent | - |
| F E B R U A R Y | 7 | E. Von Dahl Killed the Locals | The Matches | Self-released release |
| F E B R U A R Y | 8 | Calendar Days | The Rocket Summer | - |
| F E B R U A R Y | 9 | Fingers Crossed | Architecture in Helsinki | - |
| F E B R U A R Y | 10 | 100th Window | Massive Attack | - |
| F E B R U A R Y | 10 | Another Late Night: Kid Loco | Kid Loco | Compilation |
| F E B R U A R Y | 10 | The Beyond | Cult of Luna | - |
| F E B R U A R Y | 10 | An Elefant Never Forgets | The Herd | - |
| F E B R U A R Y | 10 | Lowedges | Richard Hawley | - |
| F E B R U A R Y | 11 | Any Given Thursday | John Mayer | Live |
| F E B R U A R Y | 11 | Celldweller | Celldweller | - |
| F E B R U A R Y | 11 | The Desert Storm Mixtape: Blok Party, Vol. 1 | DJ Envy | - |
| F E B R U A R Y | 11 | Do It For Love | Hall & Oates | - |
| F E B R U A R Y | 11 | Free | Brad Johner | - |
| F E B R U A R Y | 11 | The Essential Ozzy Osbourne | Ozzy Osbourne | Compilation |
| F E B R U A R Y | 11 | Ethnicity | Yanni | - |
| F E B R U A R Y | 11 | Grade 8 | Grade 8 | - |
| F E B R U A R Y | 11 | Heart | Stars | - |
| F E B R U A R Y | 11 | Hearts of Oak | Ted Leo and the Pharmacists | - |
| F E B R U A R Y | 11 | How to Start a Fire | Further Seems Forever | - |
| F E B R U A R Y | 11 | The Message at the Depth | DJ Krush | International release (outside Japan) |
| F E B R U A R Y | 11 | Michael Bublé | Michael Bublé | - |
| F E B R U A R Y | 11 | Next Big Thing | Vince Gill | - |
| F E B R U A R Y | 11 | Red Cross | John Fahey | - |
| F E B R U A R Y | 11 | Strapping Young Lad | Strapping Young Lad | - |
| F E B R U A R Y | 11 | These Are the Vistas | The Bad Plus | - |
| F E B R U A R Y | 11 | Things That Lovers Do | Kenny Lattimore and Chanté Moore | - |
| F E B R U A R Y | 11 | Vertical Vision | Christian McBride | - |
| F E B R U A R Y | 11 | We're a Happy Family: A Tribute to Ramones | Various Artists | Ramones tribute |
| F E B R U A R Y | 12 | Beautiful | Fish Leong | - |
| F E B R U A R Y | 13 | Blue Limbo | Susumu Hirasawa | - |
| F E B R U A R Y | 13 | Mona Lisa Overdrive | Buck-Tick | - |
| F E B R U A R Y | 14 | No Turning Back | Imelda May | - |
| F E B R U A R Y | 15 | Boardface | Gotye | - |
| F E B R U A R Y | 17 | Chocolate Factory | R. Kelly | - |
| F E B R U A R Y | 17 | From Every Sphere | Ed Harcourt | - |
| F E B R U A R Y | 17 | Office of Strategic Influence | OSI | - |
| F E B R U A R Y | 17 | One Kill Wonder | The Haunted | - |
| F E B R U A R Y | 18 | A Promise | Xiu Xiu | - |
| F E B R U A R Y | 18 | Animositisomina | Ministry | - |
| F E B R U A R Y | 18 | Antipop vs. Matthew Shipp | Antipop Consortium and Matthew Shipp | - |
| F E B R U A R Y | 18 | Cyclorama | Styx | - |
| F E B R U A R Y | 18 | Deep Water Slang V2.0 | Zion I | - |
| F E B R U A R Y | 18 | The Detroit Experiment | The Detroit Experiment | - |
| F E B R U A R Y | 18 | Dub Side of the Moon | Easy Star All-Stars | - |
| F E B R U A R Y | 18 | Famous Among the Barns | Ben Taylor | - |
| F E B R U A R Y | 18 | Feast of Wire | Calexico | - |
| F E B R U A R Y | 18 | Jennifer Hanson | Jennifer Hanson | - |
| F E B R U A R Y | 18 | Sleep and Release | Aereogramme | - |
| F E B R U A R Y | 18 | Under the Tray | Reggie and the Full Effect | - |
| F E B R U A R Y | 18 | You Are Free | Cat Power | - |
| F E B R U A R Y | 19 | All Else Failed | Zao | Re-issue |
| F E B R U A R Y | 19 | The Black Mages | The Black Mages | - |
| F E B R U A R Y | 19 | Give Up | The Postal Service | - |
| F E B R U A R Y | 19 | Present | Bonnie Pink | - |
| F E B R U A R Y | 23 | The Austin Sessions | Edwin McCain | - |
| F E B R U A R Y | 23 | Kalk Samen Kuri no Hana | Ringo Sheena | - |
| F E B R U A R Y | 24 | Begin... | Cyndi Wang | - |
| F E B R U A R Y | 24 | Blood Duster | Blood Duster | - |
| F E B R U A R Y | 24 | Everything's Eventual | Appleton | - |
| F E B R U A R Y | 24 | Fünfzehn neue D.A.F.-Lieder | Deutsch Amerikanische Freundschaft | - |
| F E B R U A R Y | 24 | Souvenirs | The Gathering | - |
| F E B R U A R Y | 25 | The Art of Losing | American Hi-Fi | US |
| F E B R U A R Y | 25 | Baby I'm Bored | Evan Dando | - |
| F E B R U A R Y | 25 | The Beautiful Letdown | Switchfoot | - |
| F E B R U A R Y | 25 | Beginnings | Memento | - |
| F E B R U A R Y | 25 | Deuce | The D.O.C. | - |
| F E B R U A R Y | 25 | Divided Highway | The Doobie Brothers | Compilation |
| F E B R U A R Y | 25 | Forty Hour Train Back to Penn | The Movielife | - |
| F E B R U A R Y | 25 | The Listening | Little Brother | Debut |
| F E B R U A R Y | 25 | Livin' Legend | B.G. | - |
| F E B R U A R Y | 25 | The Music | The Music | US |
| F E B R U A R Y | 25 | Nate Dogg | Nate Dogg | - |
| F E B R U A R Y | 25 | Philadelphia Freeway | Freeway | - |
| F E B R U A R Y | 25 | Ruff Draft | J Dilla | - |
| F E B R U A R Y | 25 | Thalía's Hits Remixed | Thalía | Remix |
| F E B R U A R Y | 25 | Valley of the Damned | DragonForce | - |
| F E B R U A R Y | 26 | Enchant | Emilie Autumn | - |
| F E B R U A R Y | 27 | Ai wo Kudasai | Hideaki Tokunaga | - |
| M A R C H | 3 | Fly | Sick Puppies | EP |
| M A R C H | 3 | Human Zoo | Gotthard | - |
| M A R C H | 3 | Passionoia | Black Box Recorder | - |
| M A R C H | 3 | Statues | Moloko | - |
| M A R C H | 3 | Zitilites | Kashmir | - |
| M A R C H | 4 | Avalanche | Matthew Good | - |
| M A R C H | 4 | The Best of Run-DMC | Run-D.M.C. | Compilation |
| M A R C H | 4 | Every Given Moment | Stereomud | - |
| M A R C H | 4 | Everything Is Good Here/Please Come Home | The Angels of Light | - |
| M A R C H | 4 | Fallen | Evanescence | US |
| M A R C H | 4 | Hootie & the Blowfish | Hootie & the Blowfish | - |
| M A R C H | 4 | Joyride | Oleander | - |
| M A R C H | 4 | Kidz Bop 4 | Kidz Bop Kids | - |
| M A R C H | 4 | La Bella Mafia | Lil' Kim | - |
| M A R C H | 4 | The Magnolia Electric Co. | Songs: Ohia | - |
| M A R C H | 4 | More Parts per Million | The Thermals | Debut |
| M A R C H | 4 | The New Folk Implosion | The Folk Implosion | - |
| M A R C H | 4 | The Power to Believe | King Crimson | - |
| M A R C H | 4 | Revolusongs | Sepultura | EP |
| M A R C H | 4 | So Long, Astoria | The Ataris | - |
| M A R C H | 4 | Street Dreams | Fabolous | - |
| M A R C H | 4 | Turn It Around | Comeback Kid | - |
| M A R C H | 4 | The Ugly Organ | Cursive | - |
| M A R C H | 4 | The Well's on Fire | Procol Harum | - |
| M A R C H | 4 | Where Shall You Take Me? | Damien Jurado | - |
| M A R C H | 5 | Oh My Sister | Soulhead | - |
| M A R C H | 6 | Too | Fantastic Plastic Machine | - |
| M A R C H | 7 | Just Listen | Seven | - |
| M A R C H | 7 | Put on Your Rosy Red Glasses | The Number Twelve Looks Like You | - |
| M A R C H | 10 | Hate Them | Darkthrone | - |
| M A R C H | 10 | Reason | Melanie C | - |
| M A R C H | 11 | Becoming I | Ünloco | - |
| M A R C H | 11 | Diamonds on the Inside | Ben Harper | - |
| M A R C H | 11 | Dust | DJ Muggs | Debut |
| M A R C H | 11 | The Essential Clash | The Clash | US; Compilation |
| M A R C H | 11 | Everything Will Never Be OK | Fiction Plane | - |
| M A R C H | 11 | Evolve | Ani DiFranco | - |
| M A R C H | 11 | Hellalive | Machine Head | Live |
| M A R C H | 11 | I Love It | Craig Morgan | - |
| M A R C H | 11 | Just One More | Mad Caddies | - |
| M A R C H | 11 | Level II | Blackstreet | - |
| M A R C H | 11 | Log 22 | Bettie Serveert | - |
| M A R C H | 11 | Monster | Killer Mike | - |
| M A R C H | 11 | Recreation Day | Evergrey | - |
| M A R C H | 11 | Sing the Sorrow | AFI | - |
| M A R C H | 11 | 26 Songs | Melvins | - |
| M A R C H | 11 | Slow Motion Daydream | Everclear | - |
| M A R C H | 11 | Sounds of St. Lucia: Live | Acoustic Alchemy | Live |
| M A R C H | 11 | Two Lefts Don't Make a Right...but Three Do | Relient K | - |
| M A R C H | 11 | Volume 4 | Joe Jackson | - |
| M A R C H | 12 | Ayaueto | Aya Ueto | - |
| M A R C H | 17 | Atticus: ...dragging the lake, Vol. 2 | Various Artists | Compilation |
| M A R C H | 17 | Back in the World | Paul McCartney | Live |
| M A R C H | 17 | Hellraiser: Best of the Epic Years | Motörhead | Compilation |
| M A R C H | 17 | Neon Nights | Dannii Minogue | International |
| M A R C H | 18 | Apple O' | Deerhoof | - |
| M A R C H | 18 | Blackout | Hed PE | - |
| M A R C H | 18 | Boomkatalog.One | Boomkat | Debut |
| M A R C H | 18 | Buzzcocks | Buzzcocks | - |
| M A R C H | 18 | Catch the Rainbow: The Anthology | Rainbow | Compilation |
| M A R C H | 18 | The Detroit Experiment | The Detroit Experiment | Debut |
| M A R C H | 18 | Hittin' the Note | The Allman Brothers Band | - |
| M A R C H | 18 | I'm Just a Girl | Deana Carter | - |
| M A R C H | 18 | Kill or Be Killed | Biohazard | - |
| M A R C H | 18 | Live in Brazil | Concrete Blonde | Live |
| M A R C H | 18 | Pig Lib | Stephen Malkmus and the Jicks | - |
| M A R C H | 18 | Slanguage | Awol One and Daddy Kev | - |
| M A R C H | 18 | Stash Box EP | Kottonmouth Kings | EP |
| M A R C H | 18 | Supper | Smog | - |
| M A R C H | 18 | Transfiguration of Vincent | M. Ward | - |
| M A R C H | 18 | Da Undaground Heat, Vol. 1 | MC Lyte | - |
| M A R C H | 19 | Dix Infernal | Moi dix Mois | - |
| M A R C H | 19 | Long Gone Before Daylight | The Cardigans | - |
| M A R C H | 21 | Get Back | The Basics | Debut |
| M A R C H | 21 | Innocent Eyes | Delta Goodrem | - |
| M A R C H | 24 | The Pop Hits | Roxette | Compilation |
| M A R C H | 24 | Ringo Rama | Ringo Starr | - |
| M A R C H | 24 | 26 Mixes for Cash | Aphex Twin | Remix |
| M A R C H | 24 | U-Turn | Brian McKnight | - |
| M A R C H | 24 | Viva Emptiness | Katatonia | - |
| M A R C H | 25 | Balls & My Word | Scarface | - |
| M A R C H | 25 | Double Live Annihilation | Annihilator | Live |
| M A R C H | 25 | Fall Out Boy's Evening Out with Your Girlfriend | Fall Out Boy | EP |
| M A R C H | 25 | The First Sessions | Warren Zevon | Compilation |
| M A R C H | 25 | House of 1000 Corpses: Original Motion Picture Soundtrack | Rob Zombie/Various Artists | Soundtrack |
| M A R C H | 25 | Let 'Em Burn | Hot Boys | - |
| M A R C H | 25 | Mes courants électriques | Alizée | - |
| M A R C H | 25 | Meteora | Linkin Park | - |
| M A R C H | 25 | Now That's What I Call Music! 12 (U.S. series) | Various Artists | Compilation |
| M A R C H | 25 | One Heart | Celine Dion | - |
| M A R C H | 25 | Radio Amor | Tim Hecker | - |
| M A R C H | 25 | Regaining Unconsciousness | NOFX | EP |
| M A R C H | 25 | Rules of Travel | Rosanne Cash | - |
| M A R C H | 25 | Scattered Ashes: A Decade of Emperial Wrath | Emperor | Compilation |
| M A R C H | 25 | Destination: Beautiful | Mae | - |
| M A R C H | 25 | Stacie Orrico | Stacie Orrico | - |
| M A R C H | 25 | Star | 702 | - |
| M A R C H | 25 | Top of the World Tour: Live | Dixie Chicks | Live |
| M A R C H | 27 | Likferd | Windir | - |
| M A R C H | 31 | Nordland II | Bathory | - |
| M A R C H | 31 | Up in Flames | Manitoba | - |
| M A R C H | ? | Campfire Songs | Animal Collective | - |

=== April–June ===
| Date | | Album | Artist | Note |
|---|---|---|---|---|
| A P R I L | 1 | Chris Cagle | Chris Cagle | - |
| A P R I L | 1 | Danse Macabre Remixes | The Faint | Remix |
| A P R I L | 1 | Elephant | The White Stripes | - |
| A P R I L | 1 | The Essential Electric Light Orchestra | Electric Light Orchestra | Compilation |
| A P R I L | 1 | Guitar Romantic | The Exploding Hearts | - |
| A P R I L | 1 | Keep on Your Mean Side | The Kills | Debut |
| A P R I L | 1 | The Secret of Elena's Tomb | ...And You Will Know Us by the Trail of Dead | EP |
| A P R I L | 1 | Sleeping with Ghosts | Placebo | - |
| A P R I L | 1 | SouthernUnderground | CunninLynguists | - |
| A P R I L | 1 | Tomorrow Come Today | Boysetsfire | - |
| A P R I L | 1 | Weather Systems | Andrew Bird | - |
| A P R I L | 2 | Transatlantic Demos | Neal Morse | - |
| A P R I L | 5 | Clown Circus | Lemon Demon | - |
| A P R I L | 7 | Anxiety Always | Adult | - |
| A P R I L | 7 | Berlinette | Ellen Allien | - |
| A P R I L | 7 | Draft 7.30 | Autechre | - |
| A P R I L | 7 | Frengers | Mew | - |
| A P R I L | 7 | Vehicles & Animals | Athlete | - |
| A P R I L | 8 | Adoration: The Worship Album | Newsboys | - |
| A P R I L | 8 | Ailleurs land | Florent Pagny | - |
| A P R I L | 8 | Blaze | Lagwagon | - |
| A P R I L | 8 | The Blueprint 2.1 | Jay-Z | - |
| A P R I L | 8 | Faceless | Godsmack | - |
| A P R I L | 8 | Hatefiles | Fear Factory | Compilation |
| A P R I L | 8 | Mouthfuls | Fruit Bats | - |
| A P R I L | 8 | Rainy Day Music | The Jayhawks | - |
| A P R I L | 8 | Revolutions per Minute | Rise Against | - |
| A P R I L | 8 | The Senior | Ginuwine | - |
| A P R I L | 8 | Sizzlin' | Fattburger | - |
| A P R I L | 8 | Soul Food Taqueria | Tommy Guerrero | - |
| A P R I L | 8 | Summer Sun | Yo La Tengo | - |
| A P R I L | 8 | Sunlight Makes Me Paranoid | Elefant | - |
| A P R I L | 8 | Thickfreakness | The Black Keys | - |
| A P R I L | 8 | 26 Miles | Sean Watkins | - |
| A P R I L | 8 | West For Wishing | Matchbook Romance | EP |
| A P R I L | 8 | To Whom It May Concern | Lisa Marie Presley | - |
| A P R I L | 8 | World Without Tears | Lucinda Williams | - |
| A P R I L | 13 | The Great Fall | Narnia | - |
| A P R I L | 14 | Below the Lights | Enslaved | - |
| A P R I L | 14 | Dead Cities, Red Seas & Lost Ghosts | M83 | - |
| A P R I L | 14 | Love Metal | HIM | - |
| A P R I L | 14 | Now That's What I Call Music! 54 (UK series) | Various Artists | Compilation |
| A P R I L | 14 | The Path | Show of Hands | - |
| A P R I L | 15 | Ball | Widespread Panic | - |
| A P R I L | 15 | A Beautiful World | Thicke | re-release of Cherry Blue Skies |
| A P R I L | 15 | Day I Forgot | Pete Yorn | - |
| A P R I L | 15 | Dragonfly | Ziggy Marley | - |
| A P R I L | 15 | Lullaby for Liquid Pig | Lisa Germano | - |
| A P R I L | 15 | No Cities Left | The Dears | - |
| A P R I L | 15 | Now | Jessica Andrews | - |
| A P R I L | 15 | Say You Will | Fleetwood Mac | - |
| A P R I L | 15 | The Smell of Our Own | The Hidden Cameras | - |
| A P R I L | 15 | Thankful | Kelly Clarkson | Debut album |
| A P R I L | 16 | Jade-3 | Jade Kwan | - |
| A P R I L | 18 | The Link | Gojira | - |
| A P R I L | 22 | American Life | Madonna | - |
| A P R I L | 22 | Atomic Kitten | Atomic Kitten | - |
| A P R I L | 22 | The Blessed Hellride | Black Label Society | - |
| A P R I L | 22 | Cheeses... | Five Iron Frenzy | Compilation |
| A P R I L | 22 | Classic | Eric B. & Rakim | Compilation |
| A P R I L | 22 | Damnation | Opeth | - |
| A P R I L | 22 | Darker Than Black | Cage | - |
| A P R I L | 22 | Dopesmoker | Sleep | - |
| A P R I L | 22 | The Essential Byrds | The Byrds | Compilation |
| A P R I L | 22 | Everybody Loves You | Kaki King | - |
| A P R I L | 22 | Into the Valley of Death | Death by Stereo | - |
| A P R I L | 22 | Kimi Ga Suki | Matthew Sweet | - |
| A P R I L | 22 | Kristyles | KRS-One | - |
| A P R I L | 22 | A Night at the Booty Bar | Disco D | - |
| A P R I L | 22 | Sans Souci | Frenzal Rhomb | - |
| A P R I L | 22 | Secondary Protocol | Wildchild | Debut |
| A P R I L | 22 | Serart | Ser, art | - |
| A P R I L | 22 | Shine | Daniel Lanois | - |
| A P R I L | 22 | Songs of Life | Bret Michaels | - |
| A P R I L | 22 | Skeletons | Nothingface | - |
| A P R I L | 22 | 39 Minutes of Bliss (In an Otherwise Meaningless World) | Caesars | Compilation |
| A P R I L | 22 | What If It All Means Something | Chantal Kreviazuk | US |
| A P R I L | 22 | White1 | Sunn O))) | - |
| A P R I L | 23 | More Like the Moon | Wilco | EP |
| A P R I L | 23 | Osavurio: Ai wa Matte Kurenai | Kaori Iida | - |
| A P R I L | 24 | Exclusive | U2 | EP; iTunes |
| A P R I L | 24 | Welcome to Dun Vegas | Peatbog Faeries | - |
| A P R I L | 28 | Black Cherry | Goldfrapp | - |
| A P R I L | 28 | Counterfeit 2 | Martin L. Gore | Debut |
| A P R I L | 28 | The Trouble with Being Myself | Macy Gray | UK |
| A P R I L | 28 | The World According to RZA | RZA | - |
| A P R I L | 29 | Duos for Doris | Keith Rowe and John Tilbury | - |
| A P R I L | 29 | Fever to Tell | Yeah Yeah Yeahs | - |
| A P R I L | 29 | He's Keith Murray | Keith Murray | - |
| A P R I L | 29 | The Matrix Reloaded: The Album | Various Artists | Soundtrack |
| A P R I L | 29 | Meet the Girl Next Door | Lil' Mo | - |
| A P R I L | 29 | Plasma | Trey Anastasio | Live |
| M A Y | 2 | Soviet Kitsch | Regina Spektor | - |
| M A Y | 5 | High Anxiety | Therapy? | - |
| M A Y | 5 | Mind Revolution | Skyfire | - |
| M A Y | 5 | Rounds | Four Tet | UK |
| M A Y | 5 | Think Tank | Blur | - |
| M A Y | 5 | Welcome to the Monkey House | The Dandy Warhols | - |
| M A Y | 6 | Alcazarized | Alcazar | - |
| M A Y | 6 | As the Palaces Burn | Lamb of God | - |
| M A Y | 6 | Being Ridden | Cex | - |
| M A Y | 6 | Beneath This Gruff Exterior | John Hiatt | - |
| M A Y | 6 | Blueprints for the Black Market | Anberlin | - |
| M A Y | 6 | Body Kiss | The Isley Brothers featuring Ronald Isley, aka Mr. Biggs | - |
| M A Y | 6 | BR Instrumentals | Cex | - |
| M A Y | 6 | Committed to a Bright Future | Dog Fashion Disco | - |
| M A Y | 6 | Dirty Sweet | Jet | EP |
| M A Y | 6 | DPGC: U Know What I'm Throwin' Up | Daz Dillinger | - |
| M A Y | 6 | Electric Version | The New Pornographers | - |
| M A Y | 6 | Figure Number Five | Soilwork | - |
| M A Y | 6 | Jalopy Go Far | Zolof the Rock & Roll Destroyer | - |
| M A Y | 6 | Mit Gas | Tomahawk | - |
| M A Y | 6 | Movement | Gossip | - |
| M A Y | 6 | O' Cracker Where Art Thou? | Cracker | - |
| M A Y | 6 | On and On | Jack Johnson | - |
| M A Y | 6 | One Word Extinguisher | Prefuse 73 | - |
| M A Y | 6 | Politics of the Business | Prince Paul | - |
| M A Y | 6 | Pulse | Front 242 | - |
| M A Y | 6 | Scandinavian Leather | Turbonegro | US |
| M A Y | 6 | Send | Wire | - |
| M A Y | 6 | Take This to Your Grave | Fall Out Boy | - |
| M A Y | 6 | The War on Errorism | NOFX | - |
| M A Y | 6 | We've Come for You All | Anthrax | - |
| M A Y | 6 | When I Pretend to Fall | The Long Winters | - |
| M A Y | 10 | Reviens | Garou | - |
| M A Y | 12 | Cats and Dogs | Talisman | - |
| M A Y | 12 | A Flock of Bleeps | Younger Brother | - |
| M A Y | 12 | Late Night Tales: Nightmares on Wax | Nightmares on Wax | Compilation |
| M A Y | 12 | The Michael Franks Anthology: The Art of Love | Michael Franks | Compilation |
| M A Y | 12 | Singles Box Set 1981–1985 | Duran Duran | Box Set |
| M A Y | 13 | Days of Our Lives | Bro'Sis | - |
| M A Y | 13 | The Golden Age of Grotesque | Marilyn Manson | - |
| M A Y | 13 | Good Mourning | Alkaline Trio | - |
| M A Y | 13 | The Impossibility of Reason | Chimaira | - |
| M A Y | 13 | Out of the Vein | Third Eye Blind | LP & DVD |
| M A Y | 13 | Sumday | Grandaddy | - |
| M A Y | 13 | Year of the Spider | Cold | - |
| M A Y | 19 | The Black Babies | Devendra Banhart | - |
| M A Y | 19 | Goodbye Swingtime | The Matthew Herbert Big Band | Debut |
| M A Y | 19 | Something Dangerous | Natacha Atlas | - |
| M A Y | 19 | Vulnerable | Tricky | - |
| M A Y | 20 | 14 Shades of Grey | Staind | - |
| M A Y | 20 | A | Cass McCombs | - |
| M A Y | 20 | Almas del Silencio | Ricky Martin | - |
| M A Y | 20 | Anthem | Less Than Jake | - |
| M A Y | 20 | Balance | Akrobatik | Debut |
| M A Y | 20 | Beard of Lightning | Phantom Tollbooth | - |
| M A Y | 20 | Birds of Pray | Live | - |
| M A Y | 20 | Black Like Sunday | King's X | - |
| M A Y | 20 | Born to Be Free | Sonique | - |
| M A Y | 20 | Boz Scaggs | Boz Scaggs | Covers album |
| M A Y | 20 | Cyborgs Revisited | Simply Saucer | Re-issue |
| M A Y | 20 | Deftones | Deftones | - |
| M A Y | 20 | Fire | Electric Six | - |
| M A Y | 20 | For All the Drugs in the World | Sponge | - |
| M A Y | 20 | Harem | Sarah Brightman | - |
| M A Y | 20 | I Am the Fun Blame Monster! | Menomena | - |
| M A Y | 20 | Laughing City | Eisley | EP |
| M A Y | 20 | Live: Hallelujah | Sammy Hagar and The Waboritas | Live |
| M A Y | 20 | Mississippi: The Album | David Banner | - |
| M A Y | 20 | Not in My Name | Saul Williams | EP |
| M A Y | 20 | Places for Breathing | Revis | - |
| M A Y | 20 | Poodle Hat | "Weird Al" Yankovic | - |
| M A Y | 20 | The Promise | Earth, Wind & Fire | - |
| M A Y | 20 | Rabbit Don't Come Easy | Helloween | - |
| M A Y | 20 | The Streetsweeper, Vol. 1 | DJ Kay Slay | Debut |
| M A Y | 20 | Transform | Powerman 5000 | - |
| M A Y | 20 | Über Alles | Hanzel Und Gretyl | - |
| M A Y | 20 | Up All Night | The John Scofield Band | - |
| M A Y | 20 | Vicious Cycle | Lynyrd Skynyrd | - |
| M A Y | 20 | When Broken Is Easily Fixed | Silverstein | - |
| M A Y | 20 | Yours, Mine & Ours | Pernice Brothers | - |
| M A Y | 22 | C21 | C21 | - |
| M A Y | 24 | Lucky Bastards | Peter Pan Speedrock | - |
| M A Y | 26 | Friend or Foe? | Blackmail | - |
| M A Y | 26 | Led Zeppelin DVD | Led Zeppelin | DVD |
| M A Y | 26 | Man with a Movie Camera | The Cinematic Orchestra | - |
| M A Y | 26 | N·E·W·S | Prince | - |
| M A Y | 26 | Where Have You Been Tonight? Live | Shed Seven | Live |
| M A Y | 27 | Falling Uphill | Lillix | - |
| M A Y | 27 | How the West Was Won | Led Zeppelin | Live 1972 |
| M A Y | 27 | In Between Now and Then | O.A.R. | - |
| M A Y | 27 | Leave a Whisper | Shinedown | - |
| M A Y | 27 | The No Fun EP | Local H | EP |
| M A Y | 27 | Olympia Deuxmilletrois | Marc Lavoine | Live |
| M A Y | 27 | Rooney | Rooney | - |
| M A Y | 27 | Roorback | Sepultura | - |
| M A Y | 27 | So Much for the City | The Thrills | - |
| M A Y | 27 | Smile Empty Soul | Smile Empty Soul | - |
| M A Y | 27 | Tubular Bells 2003 | Mike Oldfield | - |
| M A Y | 27 | Winterheart's Guild | Sonata Arctica | - |
| M A Y | 30 | Atlantis Princess | BoA | - |
| M A Y | - | Velvet Lined Shell | Toyah | EP |
| J U N E | 2 | Hidden Hands of a Sadist Nation | Darkest Hour | - |
| J U N E | 2 | Paper Monsters | Dave Gahan | Europe; Debut |
| J U N E | 2 | You Gotta Go There to Come Back | Stereophonics | - |
| J U N E | 3 | 0304 | Jewel | - |
| J U N E | 3 | 2003 Warped Tour Compilation | Various Artists | Compilation |
| J U N E | 3 | Dream to Make Believe | Armor for Sleep | - |
| J U N E | 3 | Ego War | Audio Bullys | - |
| J U N E | 3 | Explode | The Unseen | - |
| J U N E | 3 | From There to Here: Greatest Hits | Lonestar | Compilation |
| J U N E | 3 | Home | Simply Red | - |
| J U N E | 3 | In Person Friday and Saturday Nights at the Blackhawk, Complete | Miles Davis | Box Set |
| J U N E | 3 | In the Pursuit of Leisure | Sugar Ray | - |
| J U N E | 3 | L'Avventura | Dean & Britta | Debut |
| J U N E | 3 | Liberation: Songs to Benefit PETA | Various Artists | Compilation |
| J U N E | 3 | Love & Hate | Aceyalone | - |
| J U N E | 3 | Mighty | The Planet Smashers | - |
| J U N E | 3 | Moe Life | Big Moe | - |
| J U N E | 3 | My Private Nation | Train | - |
| J U N E | 3 | Paper Monsters | Dave Gahan | North America |
| J U N E | 3 | Redwood | Lunasa | - |
| J U N E | 3 | Shootenanny! | Eels | - |
| J U N E | 3 | Something to Crow About | Riverboat Gamblers | - |
| J U N E | 3 | Soul Journey | Gillian Welch | - |
| J U N E | 3 | Trouble No More | John Mellencamp | - |
| J U N E | 3 | We Were Born in a Flame | Sam Roberts | - |
| J U N E | 5 | The Phantom Agony | Epica | Debut |
| J U N E | 5 | St. Anger | Metallica | - |
| J U N E | 5 | Windwardtidesandwaywardsails | Down by Law | - |
| J U N E | 9 | Hail to the Thief | Radiohead | - |
| J U N E | 9 | A Strangely Isolated Place | Ulrich Schnauss | - |
| J U N E | 9 | Universal Hall | The Waterboys | - |
| J U N E | 10 | Bare | Annie Lennox | - |
| J U N E | 10 | Blackout | Dropkick Murphys | - |
| J U N E | 10 | Dance with My Father | Luther Vandross | - |
| J U N E | 10 | Everything Must Go | Steely Dan | - |
| J U N E | 10 | Joe Budden | Joe Budden | - |
| J U N E | 10 | Justin Guarini | Justin Guarini | - |
| J U N E | 10 | Mest | Mest | - |
| J U N E | 10 | The Movement | Inspectah Deck | - |
| J U N E | 10 | The Movement | Mo Thugs | - |
| J U N E | 10 | New Sacred Cow | Kenna | - |
| J U N E | 10 | Playwutchyalike: The Best of Digital Underground | Digital Underground | Compilation |
| J U N E | 10 | Replay | Play | - |
| J U N E | 10 | Sounds of Summer: The Very Best of The Beach Boys | The Beach Boys | Compilation |
| J U N E | 10 | Trigger | In Flames | EP |
| J U N E | 10 | Ultimate Kenny G | Kenny G | Compilation |
| J U N E | 10 | Welcome Interstate Managers | Fountains of Wayne | - |
| J U N E | 15 | Arcade Fire | Arcade Fire | EP |
| J U N E | 16 | 76 | Armin van Buuren | Debut |
| J U N E | 16 | Taste the Secret | Ugly Duckling | - |
| J U N E | 16 | The Vertigo of Bliss | Biffy Clyro | - |
| J U N E | 17 | After the Storm | Monica | - |
| J U N E | 17 | Ambulance LTD | Ambulance LTD | Debut; EP |
| J U N E | 17 | Arachnophobiac | Michael Schenker Group | - |
| J U N E | 17 | Are We Really Happy with Who We Are Right Now? | Moneen | - |
| J U N E | 17 | AttenCHUN! | Bone Crusher | - |
| J U N E | 17 | A Blessing in Disguise | Green Carnation | - |
| J U N E | 17 | Chapters | Amorphis | - |
| J U N E | 17 | Decoration Day | Drive-By Truckers | - |
| J U N E | 17 | Deja Entendu | Brand New | - |
| J U N E | 17 | Finger Eleven | Finger Eleven | - |
| J U N E | 17 | Ghost of a Rose | Blackmore's Night | - |
| J U N E | 17 | The Grey Area | Onry Ozzborn | - |
| J U N E | 17 | Happy Songs for Happy People | Mogwai | - |
| J U N E | 17 | Here Comes the Indian | Animal Collective | - |
| J U N E | 17 | In Response | This Day Forward | - |
| J U N E | 17 | Life Is Killing Me | Type O Negative | - |
| J U N E | 17 | The Man on the Burning Tightrope | Firewater | - |
| J U N E | 17 | A Match and Some Gasoline | The Suicide Machines | - |
| J U N E | 17 | MCMLXXXV | Rufio | - |
| J U N E | 17 | Odd How People Shake | Fear Before the March of Flames | Debut |
| J U N E | 17 | Passenger | Passenger | - |
| J U N E | 17 | Rememberese | The Stills | EP |
| J U N E | 17 | Stupidity | Bad Manners | - |
| J U N E | 17 | Take Me to Your Leader | King Geedorah | pseudonym of MF Doom |
| J U N E | 17 | Translating the Name | Saosin | EP |
| J U N E | 17 | True Reflections | Boyd Tinsley | - |
| J U N E | 17 | Unhallowed | The Black Dahlia Murder | Debut album |
| J U N E | 17 | Waiting for the Moon | Tindersticks | - |
| J U N E | 18 | Venus and Other Hits | Bananarama | Compilation |
| J U N E | 20 | Dangerously in Love | Beyoncé | - |
| J U N E | 20 | Jade-3 Powerful Pack | Jade Kwan | - |
| J U N E | 23 | Kerrang! High Voltage | Various Artists | Compilation |
| J U N E | 23 | Live Kreation | Kreator | Live |
| J U N E | 24 | Aesthetic | From First to Last | EP |
| J U N E | 24 | Almost Famous | Lumidee | - |
| J U N E | 24 | Between the Never and the Now | Vendetta Red | - |
| J U N E | 24 | Bittersweet | Blu Cantrell | - |
| J U N E | 24 | De-Loused in the Comatorium | The Mars Volta | - |
| J U N E | 24 | Elephunk | The Black Eyed Peas | - |
| J U N E | 24 | A Flame to the Ground Beneath | Lost Horizon | - |
| J U N E | 24 | Hotel Paper | Michelle Branch | - |
| J U N E | 24 | I Am the Movie | Motion City Soundtrack | Epitaph re-release |
| J U N E | 24 | Keep It Together | Guster | - |
| J U N E | 24 | Liz Phair | Liz Phair | - |
| J U N E | 24 | Motograter | Motograter | - |
| J U N E | 24 | The Ownerz | Gang Starr | - |
| J U N E | 24 | Population Me | Dwight Yoakam | - |
| J U N E | 24 | Radio Contact | Acoustic Alchemy | - |
| J U N E | 24 | Re:Mix Momentum | TobyMac | - |
| J U N E | 24 | Shades of Blue: Madlib Invades Blue Note | Madlib | Remix |
| J U N E | 24 | Southwest | Daz Dillinger | - |
| J U N E | 24 | Da Unbreakables | Three 6 Mafia | - |
| J U N E | 24 | Welcome to Blue Island | Enuff Z'nuff | US |
| J U N E | 30 | Lovers | The Sleepy Jackson | - |
| J U N E | 30 | Parts of the Process | Morcheeba | Compilation |
| J U N E | 30 | Sweet Vengeance | Nightrage | Debit |

=== July–September ===
| Date | | Album | Artist | Notes |
|---|---|---|---|---|
| J U L Y | 1 | Chapter II | Ashanti | - |
| J U L Y | 1 | Frail Words Collapse | As I Lay Dying | - |
| J U L Y | 1 | The Golden River | Frog Eyes | - |
| J U L Y | 1 | The Green Book | Twiztid | - |
| J U L Y | 1 | History for Sale | Blue October | - |
| J U L Y | 1 | Hot Damn! | Every Time I Die | - |
| J U L Y | 1 | Live | Our Lady Peace | Live |
| J U L Y | 1 | Michigan | Sufjan Stevens | - |
| J U L Y | 1 | Take a Break | Me First and the Gimme Gimmes | - |
| J U L Y | 1 | Time Will Tell | Robert Cray | - |
| J U L Y | 1 | You Come Before You | Poison the Well | - |
| J U L Y | 2 | Radwimps | Radwimps | - |
| J U L Y | 4 | Vulture Street | Powderfinger | Australia |
| J U L Y | 7 | Kila Kila Kila | OOIOO | - |
| J U L Y | 7 | North Atlantic Drift | Ocean Colour Scene | - |
| J U L Y | 7 | Officially Dead | Veruca Salt | EP |
| J U L Y | 8 | Black August | Killah Priest | - |
| J U L Y | 8 | Broken Freedom Song: Live from San Francisco | Kris Kristofferson | Live |
| J U L Y | 8 | Diamond Dave | David Lee Roth | - |
| J U L Y | 8 | Far from Nowhere | Slick Shoes | - |
| J U L Y | 8 | Greatest Hits Collection, Vol. 1 | Trace Adkins | Compilation |
| J U L Y | 8 | Maybe Memories | The Used | Compilation |
| J U L Y | 8 | Noise for Music's Sake | Napalm Death | Compilation |
| J U L Y | 8 | Scooby Snacks: The Collection | Fun Lovin' Criminals | Compilation |
| J U L Y | 8 | Thalía | Thalía | - |
| J U L Y | 8 | The Violet Hour | The Clientele | - |
| J U L Y | 8 | Yes Remixes | Yes | Remix |
| J U L Y | 8 | Young Liars | TV on the Radio | EP |
| J U L Y | 10 | WWE Originals | World Wrestling Entertainment/Various Artists | - |
| J U L Y | 14 | Late Night Tales: Sly & Robbie | Sly & Robbie | Compilation |
| J U L Y | 14 | Lipstick Traces (A Secret History of Manic Street Preachers) | Manic Street Preachers | Compilation |
| J U L Y | 14 | Season for Assault | 8 Foot Sativa | New Zealand |
| J U L Y | 14 | Two Conversations | The Appleseed Cast | - |
| J U L Y | 15 | Bad Boys II | Various Artists | |
| J U L Y | 15 | Greatest Hits Live 2003 | April Wine | Live |
| J U L Y | 15 | Jackpot | Chingy | - |
| J U L Y | 15 | A Lil' Light | Dudley Perkins | - |
| J U L Y | 15 | Limelite, Luv & Niteclubz | Da Brat | - |
| J U L Y | 15 | Making the Grade | Diffuser | - |
| J U L Y | 15 | Masked and Anonymous (Music from the Motion Picture) | Various Artists | Soundtrack |
| J U L Y | 15 | Other Hours: Connick on Piano, Volume 1 | Harry Connick Jr. | - |
| J U L Y | 15 | Red Dirt Road | Brooks & Dunn | - |
| J U L Y | 15 | The Trouble with Being Myself | Macy Gray | US |
| J U L Y | 15 | The Resignation | Rx Bandits | - |
| J U L Y | 15 | Wave on Wave | Pat Green | - |
| J U L Y | 15 | Year of the Rabbit | Year of the Rabbit | - |
| J U L Y | 17 | Promise of Love | The American Analog Set | - |
| J U L Y | 18 | Digital Warfare | Slapshot | |
| J U L Y | 20 | Transformer | Bruce Kulick | - |
| J U L Y | 21 | Boy in da Corner | Dizzee Rascal | Debut |
| J U L Y | 21 | Feeler | Pete Murray | - |
| J U L Y | 21 | Neveroddoreven | I Monster | - |
| J U L Y | 21 | Now That's What I Call Music! 55 (UK series) | Various Artists | Compilation |
| J U L Y | 21 | Phantom Power | Super Furry Animals | - |
| J U L Y | 22 | The Artist in the Ambulance | Thrice | - |
| J U L Y | 22 | Chariot | Gavin DeGraw | - |
| J U L Y | 22 | Dude Descending a Staircase | Apollo 440 | - |
| J U L Y | 22 | Evolver | 311 | - |
| J U L Y | 22 | Freaky Friday: Original Soundtrack | Various Artists | Soundtrack |
| J U L Y | 22 | Friends of Mine | Adam Green | US |
| J U L Y | 22 | It's All in Your Head | Eve 6 | - |
| J U L Y | 22 | A Lethal Dose of American Hatred | Superjoint Ritual | - |
| J U L Y | 22 | Man in the Air | Kurt Elling | - |
| J U L Y | 22 | Moodring | Mya | US |
| J U L Y | 22 | Mud on the Tires | Brad Paisley | - |
| J U L Y | 22 | Now That's What I Call Music! 13 (U.S. series) | Various Artists | Compilation |
| J U L Y | 22 | Ocean Avenue | Yellowcard | - |
| J U L Y | 22 | Rip the Jacker | Canibus | - |
| J U L Y | 22 | Special One | Cheap Trick | - |
| J U L Y | 22 | Speed Graphic | Ben Folds | EP |
| J U L Y | 22 | Strays | Jane's Addiction | - |
| J U L Y | 22 | Three Days Grace | Three Days Grace | - |
| J U L Y | 22 | Tribe | Queensrÿche | - |
| J U L Y | 22 | What Are You Waiting For? | FM Static | - |
| J U L Y | 22 | What's in the Bag? | Marshall Crenshaw | - |
| J U L Y | 23 | Killing Joke | Killing Joke | - |
| J U L Y | 24 | BEGIN no Ichigo Ichie | Begin | - |
| J U L Y | 28 | Blue Street (Five Guitars) | Chris Rea | - |
| J U L Y | 28 | LSG2 | LSG | - |
| J U L Y | 28 | Lycanthropy | Patrick Wolf | - |
| J U L Y | 28 | Magic and Medicine | The Coral | - |
| J U L Y | 28 | The Ultimate Yes: 35th Anniversary Collection | Yes | UK; Box Set |
| J U L Y | 29 | Carpenters Perform Carpenter | Carpenters | Compilation |
| J U L Y | 29 | Down upon the Suwannee River | Little Feat | Live |
| J U L Y | 29 | Enemies of Reality | Nevermore | - |
| J U L Y | 29 | Pass the Flask | The Bled | - |
| J U L Y | 29 | Ravipops (The Substance) | C-Rayz Walz | - |
| J U L Y | 29 | War at the Warfield | Slayer | DVD |
| A U G U S T | 1 | The Vinyl Countdown | Relient K | EP |
| A U G U S T | 4 | D-D-Don't Don't Stop the Beat | Junior Senior | - |
| A U G U S T | 4 | Final Straw | Snow Patrol | - |
| A U G U S T | 4 | Tour de France Soundtracks | Kraftwerk | - |
| A U G U S T | 5 | Belinda | Belinda Peregrín | - |
| A U G U S T | 5 | Bounce | Terence Blanchard | - |
| A U G U S T | 5 | D. Boon and Friends | D. Boon | Compilation |
| A U G U S T | 5 | Emotional Technology | BT | - |
| A U G U S T | 5 | Frozen Embers | The Crüxshadows | EP |
| A U G U S T | 5 | Get the Picture? | Smash Mouth | - |
| A U G U S T | 5 | It's the Ones Who've Cracked That the Light Shines Through | Jeffrey Lewis | - |
| A U G U S T | 5 | Jeff | Jeff Beck | - |
| A U G U S T | 5 | Quebec | Ween | - |
| A U G U S T | 5 | Thickskin | Skid Row | - |
| A U G U S T | 5 | Truth Be Told | Blues Traveler | - |
| A U G U S T | 5 | What the World Needs Now Is Love | Wynonna Judd | - |
| A U G U S T | 11 | Haha Sound | Broadcast | - |
| A U G U S T | 11 | Kokopelli | Kosheen | UK |
| A U G U S T | 11 | Rising | Shakra | - |
| A U G U S T | 12 | 5 Alive! | Carbon Leaf | Live |
| A U G U S T | 12 | Canada Songs | Daughters | Debut |
| A U G U S T | 12 | Celebrate Mistakes | Number One Gun | - |
| A U G U S T | 12 | Classic Hits Live | Kottonmouth Kings | Live |
| A U G U S T | 12 | Dungeons & Dragons | Midnight Syndicate | Official soundtrack to the role-playing game |
| A U G U S T | 12 | Go | Pat Benatar | - |
| A U G U S T | 12 | Greatest Hits Volume II | Alan Jackson | Compilation |
| A U G U S T | 12 | Kidz Bop 4 | Kidz Bop Kids | - |
| A U G U S T | 12 | Legacy: The Absolute Best | The Doors | Compilation |
| A U G U S T | 12 | A Mark, a Mission, a Brand, a Scar | Dashboard Confessional | - |
| A U G U S T | 12 | This Is Meant to Hurt You | These Arms Are Snakes | Debut EP |
| A U G U S T | 12 | Triggernometry | Onyx | - |
| A U G U S T | 18 | Cast of Thousands | Elbow | UK |
| A U G U S T | 18 | A Dead Sinking Story | Envy | - |
| A U G U S T | 18 | Genes | Dave Couse | - |
| A U G U S T | 18 | No Push Collide | Serafin | - |
| A U G U S T | 18 | Live Box | Björk | Box Set |
| A U G U S T | 18 | The Trees Are Dead & Dried Out Wait for Something Wild | Sikth | Debut |
| A U G U S T | 19 | Action Pact | Sloan | - |
| A U G U S T | 19 | Clones | The Neptunes | - |
| A U G U S T | 19 | Dierks Bentley | Dierks Bentley | - |
| A U G U S T | 19 | From Me to U | Juelz Santana | - |
| A U G U S T | 19 | Giving the Devil His Due | Coal Chamber | Compilation |
| A U G U S T | 19 | Greendale | Neil Young | - |
| A U G U S T | 19 | Hate, Malice, Revenge | All Shall Perish | Debut |
| A U G U S T | 19 | Hypnotica | Benny Benassi | - |
| A U G U S T | 19 | Indestructible | Rancid | - |
| A U G U S T | 19 | In This Skin | Jessica Simpson | - |
| A U G U S T | 19 | Jeckyll and Hyde | Petra | - |
| A U G U S T | 19 | Restless | Sara Evans | - |
| A U G U S T | 19 | Rupi's Dance | Ian Anderson | - |
| A U G U S T | 19 | Simple Things | Amy Grant | - |
| A U G U S T | 19 | Trap Muzik | T.I. | - |
| A U G U S T | 19 | TruANT | Alien Ant Farm | - |
| A U G U S T | 19 | Unleashed | Bow Wow | - |
| A U G U S T | 19 | Unstable | Adema | - |
| A U G U S T | 19 | Youth and Young Manhood | Kings of Leon | - |
| A U G U S T | 21 | BEGIN no Ichigo Ichie 58 Drive | Begin | - |
| A U G U S T | 21 | Metaphorical Music | Nujabes | - |
| A U G U S T | 22 | Back Home | Bearfoot Bluegrass | - |
| A U G U S T | 25 | Alleys to Valleys | Hermitude | Debut |
| A U G U S T | 25 | Bananas | Deep Purple | - |
| A U G U S T | 25 | Chain Gang of Love | The Raveonettes | Debut |
| A U G U S T | 25 | Extinguished: Outtakes | Prefuse 73 | EP |
| A U G U S T | 25 | Take Them On, On Your Own | Black Rebel Motorcycle Club | - |
| A U G U S T | 25 | The Wildhearts Must Be Destroyed | The Wildhearts | - |
| A U G U S T | 26 | Anchors Aweigh | The Bouncing Souls | - |
| A U G U S T | 26 | Anthems of Rebellion | Arch Enemy | US |
| A U G U S T | 26 | Burning Down the Opera | Edguy | Live |
| A U G U S T | 26 | Crimson II | Edge of Sanity | - |
| A U G U S T | 26 | Drankin' Patnaz | YoungBloodZ | - |
| A U G U S T | 26 | Everything Goes Numb | Streetlight Manifesto | - |
| A U G U S T | 26 | Hit & Run | Big Sugar | Compilation |
| A U G U S T | 26 | Inside In | Mike Gordon | Debut |
| A U G U S T | 26 | Live! The Farewell Tour | Cher | Live |
| A U G U S T | 26 | Love & Life | Mary J. Blige | - |
| A U G U S T | 26 | Love, Hell or Right | Mathematics | - |
| A U G U S T | 26 | Metamorphosis | Hilary Duff | - |
| A U G U S T | 26 | A Quick Fix of Melancholy | Ulver | EP |
| A U G U S T | 26 | Reverie Sound Revue | Reverie Sound Revue | EP |
| A U G U S T | 26 | Visions of Gandhi | Jedi Mind Tricks | - |
| A U G U S T | 26 | Waking the Fallen | Avenged Sevenfold | - |
| A U G U S T | 26 | The Wind | Warren Zevon | - |
| A U G U S T | 26 | Wooden Leather | Nappy Roots | - |
| S E P T E M B E R | 1 | I Get Along EP | The Libertines | EP |
| S E P T E M B E R | 1 | Anthology | Ocean Colour Scene | Compilation |
| S E P T E M B E R | 1 | Zzyzx | Zeromancer | - |
| S E P T E M B E R | 2 | Breathing Is Irrelevant | Ion Dissonance | - |
| S E P T E M B E R | 2 | Dance of Death | Iron Maiden | - |
| S E P T E M B E R | 2 | Down the River of Golden Dreams | Okkervil River | - |
| S E P T E M B E R | 2 | Old World Underground, Where Are You Now? | Metric | - |
| S E P T E M B E R | 2 | Sad Songs for Dirty Lovers | The National | - |
| S E P T E M B E R | 2 | Together We're Stranger | No-Man | - |
| S E P T E M B E R | 2 | Underworld | Various artists | Soundtrack |
| S E P T E M B E R | 2 | Vintage | Michael Bolton | - |
| S E P T E M B E R | 3 | Halcali Bacon | Halcali | - |
| S E P T E M B E R | 3 | Warts and All: Volume 3 | Moe | Live |
| S E P T E M B E R | 3 | Zekū | Mucc | - |
| S E P T E M B E R | 5 | Oya lélé | K3 | - |
| S E P T E M B E R | 7 | My Awakening | Blue Fringe | - |
| S E P T E M B E R | 8 | Amazing Grace | Spiritualized | - |
| S E P T E M B E R | 8 | Death Cult Armageddon | Dimmu Borgir | - |
| S E P T E M B E R | 8 | Echoes | The Rapture | - |
| S E P T E M B E R | 8 | Empty the Bones of You | Chris Clark | - |
| S E P T E M B E R | 8 | Hand Over Your Loved Ones | Wheatus | - |
| S E P T E M B E R | 8 | Here Comes the Fuzz | Mark Ronson | Debut |
| S E P T E M B E R | 9 | Alexisonfire | Alexisonfire | US |
| S E P T E M B E R | 9 | Close My Eyes | The Slackers | - |
| S E P T E M B E R | 9 | The Decline of British Sea Power | British Sea Power | - |
| S E P T E M B E R | 9 | Deric Ruttan | Deric Ruttan | - |
| S E P T E M B E R | 9 | Doll Revolution | The Bangles | - |
| S E P T E M B E R | 9 | Feel It | Some Girls | - |
| S E P T E M B E R | 9 | A Few Questions | Clay Walker | - |
| S E P T E M B E R | 9 | The Fiction We Live | From Autumn to Ashes | - |
| S E P T E M B E R | 9 | From the Ashes | Pennywise | - |
| S E P T E M B E R | 9 | Ghetto Pop Life | Danger Mouse and Jemini | - |
| S E P T E M B E R | 9 | Hallucinations | David Usher | - |
| S E P T E M B E R | 9 | Heavier Things | John Mayer | - |
| S E P T E M B E R | 9 | Hello Starling | Josh Ritter | - |
| S E P T E M B E R | 9 | Her Majesty the Decemberists | The Decemberists | - |
| S E P T E M B E R | 9 | Hocus Pocus | Enon | - |
| S E P T E M B E R | 9 | Hot Shit! | Quasi | - |
| S E P T E M B E R | 9 | It Still Moves | My Morning Jacket | - |
| S E P T E M B E R | 9 | Life on the Ropes | Sick of It All | - |
| S E P T E M B E R | 9 | Love Is the Only Soldier | Jann Arden | - |
| S E P T E M B E R | 9 | The Meadowlands | The Wrens | - |
| S E P T E M B E R | 9 | Mescalero | ZZ Top | - |
| S E P T E M B E R | 9 | The New Romance | Pretty Girls Make Graves | - |
| S E P T E M B E R | 9 | Seal IV | Seal | aka Seal IV |
| S E P T E M B E R | 9 | Self-Destructive Pattern | Spineshank | - |
| S E P T E M B E R | 9 | She Who Dwells in the Secret Place of the Most High Shall Abide Under the Shadow of the Almighty | Sinéad O'Connor | 2x CD; 1 disc rarities, 1 disc live |
| S E P T E M B E R | 9 | Show Me Your Tears | Frank Black and the Catholics | - |
| S E P T E M B E R | 9 | Welcome to Poppy's | Fun Lovin' Criminals | - |
| S E P T E M B E R | 9 | Wellwater Conspiracy | Wellwater Conspiracy | - |
| S E P T E M B E R | 9 | Wildwood Flower | June Carter Cash | - |
| S E P T E M B E R | 9 | The Wolf | Andrew W.K. | - |
| S E P T E M B E R | 10 | Vulgar | Dir En Grey | - |
| S E P T E M B E R | 11 | Smash The Octopus | Flattbush | - |
| S E P T E M B E R | 12 | Keepin' It Country | Brett Kissel | - |
| S E P T E M B E R | 12 | Reason and Truth | Concept | - |
| S E P T E M B E R | 14 | Get Born | Jet | - |
| S E P T E M B E R | 15 | Higher | Harem Scarem | - |
| S E P T E M B E R | 15 | I Am Kloot | I Am Kloot | - |
| S E P T E M B E R | 15 | Reality | David Bowie | - |
| S E P T E M B E R | 15 | Rock Rock Kiss Kiss Combo | The Fashion | - |
| S E P T E M B E R | 15 | Silence Is Easy | Starsailor | - |
| S E P T E M B E R | 15 | Traveler | Colin James | - |
| S E P T E M B E R | 15 | Underachievers Please Try Harder | Camera Obscura | - |
| S E P T E M B E R | 16 | The August Engine | Hammers of Misfortune | - |
| S E P T E M B E R | 16 | Before Everything & After | MxPx | - |
| S E P T E M B E R | 16 | Billy Talent | Billy Talent | CRIA: 3× Platinum |
| S E P T E M B E R | 16 | Call It Conspiracy | Dozer | - |
| S E P T E M B E R | 16 | Deliverance | Bubba Sparxxx | - |
| S E P T E M B E R | 16 | Go Tell It on the Mountain | The Blind Boys of Alabama | - |
| S E P T E M B E R | 16 | Grand Champ | DMX | - |
| S E P T E M B E R | 16 | The House Carpenter's Daughter | Natalie Merchant | - |
| S E P T E M B E R | 16 | Identity Crisis | Shelby Lynne | - |
| S E P T E M B E R | 16 | Ima Robot | Ima Robot | - |
| S E P T E M B E R | 16 | In Reverie | Saves the Day | - |
| S E P T E M B E R | 16 | Me & My Brother | Ying Yang Twins | - |
| S E P T E M B E R | 16 | Monolith | Omid | - |
| S E P T E M B E R | 16 | Page Avenue | Story of the Year | - |
| S E P T E M B E R | 16 | Permission to Land | The Darkness | - |
| S E P T E M B E R | 16 | The Soul Sessions | Joss Stone | US |
| S E P T E M B E R | 16 | Thirteenth Step | A Perfect Circle | - |
| S E P T E M B E R | 16 | Vaudeville Villain | Viktor Vaughn | pseudonym of MF Doom |
| S E P T E M B E R | 16 | Walk witt Me | Sheek Louch | - |
| S E P T E M B E R | 16 | War All the Time | Thursday | - |
| S E P T E M B E R | 16 | Worldwide Underground | Erykah Badu | - |
| S E P T E M B E R | 17 | Big Machine | B'z | - |
| S E P T E M B E R | 17 | Soul Free | Brown Eyed Soul | - |
| S E P T E M B E R | 19 | Alcachofa | Ricardo Villalobos | - |
| S E P T E M B E R | 19 | Glittercard | Torun Eriksen | - |
| S E P T E M B E R | 19 | Pass Me the Mic | Will Pan | - |
| S E P T E M B E R | 19 | Who's Your Step Daddy | Funkoars | Debut |
| S E P T E M B E R | 22 | Absolution | Muse | - |
| S E P T E M B E R | 22 | The Calling | Hilltop Hoods | - |
| S E P T E M B E R | 22 | Give You My World | Phil Wickham | - |
| S E P T E M B E R | 22 | Greatest Hits & Unheard Bits | Space | Compilation |
| S E P T E M B E R | 23 | Bazooka Tooth | Aesop Rock | - |
| S E P T E M B E R | 23 | Bringer of Blood | Six Feet Under | - |
| S E P T E M B E R | 23 | Caught by the Window | Pilot Speed | Canada |
| S E P T E M B E R | 23 | Cheers | Obie Trice | - |
| S E P T E M B E R | 23 | Comin' from Where I'm From | Anthony Hamilton | US |
| S E P T E M B E R | 23 | Couldn't Have Said It Better | Meat Loaf | - |
| S E P T E M B E R | 23 | Dark Chords on a Big Guitar | Joan Baez | - |
| S E P T E M B E R | 23 | The Eyes of Alice Cooper | Alice Cooper | - |
| S E P T E M B E R | 23 | Fatherfucker | Peaches | - |
| S E P T E M B E R | 23 | Gallowsbird's Bark | The Fiery Furnaces | - |
| S E P T E M B E R | 23 | Go | Vertical Horizon | - |
| S E P T E M B E R | 23 | The Greatest Story Ever Told | The Lawrence Arms | - |
| S E P T E M B E R | 23 | Heretic | Morbid Angel | - |
| S E P T E M B E R | 23 | The Long Road | Nickelback | - |
| S E P T E M B E R | 23 | The Mavericks | The Mavericks | - |
| S E P T E M B E R | 23 | Mechanical Spin Phenomena | Mnemic | - |
| S E P T E M B E R | 23 | Murphy's Law | Murphy Lee | - |
| S E P T E M B E R | 23 | Natural Selection | Fuel | - |
| S E P T E M B E R | 23 | North | Elvis Costello | - |
| S E P T E M B E R | 23 | Past, Present & Future | Rob Zombie | Compilation |
| S E P T E M B E R | 23 | The R. in R&B Collection, Vol. 1 | R. Kelly | Compilation |
| S E P T E M B E R | 23 | Results May Vary | Limp Bizkit | - |
| S E P T E M B E R | 23 | Savin Hill | Street Dogs | - |
| S E P T E M B E R | 23 | Seven's Travels | Atmosphere | - |
| S E P T E M B E R | 23 | Some Devil | Dave Matthews | - |
| S E P T E M B E R | 23 | Speakerboxxx/The Love Below | Outkast | - |
| S E P T E M B E R | 23 | Stellastarr | Stellastarr | - |
| S E P T E M B E R | 23 | Stories and Alibis | Matchbook Romance | - |
| S E P T E M B E R | 23 | Stumble into Grace | Emmylou Harris | - |
| S E P T E M B E R | 23 | Testimony | Neal Morse | - |
| S E P T E M B E R | 23 | Tha Smokin' Nephew | Baby Bash | - |
| S E P T E M B E R | 23 | Untying the Not | String Cheese Incident | - |
| S E P T E M B E R | 23 | Unwrapped | Gloria Estefan | - |
| S E P T E M B E R | 23 | Volumes 9 & 10 | The Desert Sessions | - |
| S E P T E M B E R | 23 | Want One | Rufus Wainwright | - |
| S E P T E M B E R | 23 | Want That Life | The Fixx | - |
| S E P T E M B E R | 23 | With Vision | Place of Skulls | - |
| S E P T E M B E R | 23 | WWIII | KMFDM | - |
| S E P T E M B E R | 24 | Another Day | Lene Marlin | - |
| S E P T E M B E R | 24 | Spade | Monkey Majik | - |
| S E P T E M B E R | 25 | BEGIN no Ichigo Ichie Drive in Starter | Begin | - |
| S E P T E M B E R | 26 | The Dresden Dolls | The Dresden Dolls | - |
| S E P T E M B E R | 26 | t.A.T.u. Remixes | t.A.T.u. | Remix |
| S E P T E M B E R | 29 | 2nd Verse | So Solid Crew | - |
| S E P T E M B E R | 29 | The Antidote | Moonspell | - |
| S E P T E M B E R | 29 | Clubfiles – the Album | DJ Quicksilver | - |
| S E P T E M B E R | 29 | Cuckooland | Robert Wyatt | - |
| S E P T E M B E R | 29 | Don't Look Back into the Sun/Death on the Stairs | The Libertines | EP |
| S E P T E M B E R | 29 | Effloresce | Oceansize | Debut |
| S E P T E M B E R | 29 | HTP 2 | Hughes Turner Project | - |
| S E P T E M B E R | 29 | The Other Side of Daybreak | Beth Orton | Compilation |
| S E P T E M B E R | 29 | Sacred Love | Sting | - |
| S E P T E M B E R | 29 | Volume 1 | The Besnard Lakes | - |
| S E P T E M B E R | 29 | Zoot Woman | Zoot Woman | - |
| S E P T E M B E R | 30 | 33 | Luis Miguel | - |
| S E P T E M B E R | 30 | Amar Es | Cristian Castro | - |
| S E P T E M B E R | 30 | Bette Midler Sings the Rosemary Clooney Songbook | Bette Midler | - |
| S E P T E M B E R | 30 | Billy Currington | Billy Currington | - |
| S E P T E M B E R | 30 | Casting Crowns | Casting Crowns | - |
| S E P T E M B E R | 30 | Changes | Kelly Osbourne | - |
| S E P T E M B E R | 30 | Confession | Ill Niño | - |
| S E P T E M B E R | 30 | The Jethro Tull Christmas Album | Jethro Tull | Christmas |
| S E P T E M B E R | 30 | The Journey: The Very Best of Donna Summer | Donna Summer | Compilation +2 new tracks and remix on US limited edition bonus disc |
| S E P T E M B E R | 30 | Lead Us Not into Temptation | David Byrne | - |
| S E P T E M B E R | 30 | Life For Rent | Dido | - |
| S E P T E M B E R | 30 | Live at Monsters of Rock | Gary Moore | Live |
| S E P T E M B E R | 30 | Martina | Martina McBride | - |
| S E P T E M B E R | 30 | Money Money 2020 | The Network | - |
| S E P T E M B E R | 30 | My Baby Don't Tolerate | Lyle Lovett | - |
| S E P T E M B E R | 30 | Now That's What I Call Christmas!: The Signature Collection (U.S. series) | Various Artists | Compilation |
| S E P T E M B E R | 30 | School of Rock: Music From and Inspired by the Motion Picture | Various Artists | Soundtrack |
| S E P T E M B E R | 30 | See If I Care | Gary Allan | - |
| S E P T E M B E R | 30 | Singles 93–03 | The Chemical Brothers | Compilation |
| S E P T E M B E R | 30 | So You've Ruined Your Life | Get Set Go | - |
| S E P T E M B E R | 30 | Sunny 16 | Ben Folds | EP |
| S E P T E M B E R | ? | Troubled Sleep | Prurient | - |

=== October–December ===
| Date | | Album | Artist | Notes |
|---|---|---|---|---|
| O C T O B E R | 1 | Evil Never Dies | Toxic Holocaust | - |
| O C T O B E R | 1 | Howl Howl Gaff Gaff | Shout Out Louds | - |
| O C T O B E R | 2 | Hollow Dreams | Stigmata | - |
| O C T O B E R | 2 | Reflections | Apocalyptica | - |
| O C T O B E R | 6 | Dear Catastrophe Waitress | Belle & Sebastian | - |
| O C T O B E R | 6 | Things Viral | Khanate | - |
| O C T O B E R | 7 | 8 Million Stories | Soul Position | Debut |
| O C T O B E R | 7 | 21st Century Live | Styx | Live/DVD |
| O C T O B E R | 7 | Accelerate | Jump5 | - |
| O C T O B E R | 7 | All I Want for Christmas Is a Real Good Tan | Kenny Chesney | - |
| O C T O B E R | 7 | And This Is Our Music | The Brian Jonestown Massacre | - |
| O C T O B E R | 7 | ...And Time Begins | Decrepit Birth | - |
| O C T O B E R | 7 | Animals Should Not Try to Act Like People | Primus | LP/DVD |
| O C T O B E R | 7 | Birth of a Prince | RZA | - |
| O C T O B E R | 7 | The Bootleg of the Bootleg EP | Jean Grae | EP |
| O C T O B E R | 7 | Champion Sound | Jaylib | - |
| O C T O B E R | 7 | Chicken-n-Beer | Ludacris | - |
| O C T O B E R | 7 | Collideøscope | Living Colour | - |
| O C T O B E R | 7 | Comfort to the Soul | Ana Popović | - |
| O C T O B E R | 7 | Full Circle | Hieroglyphics | - |
| O C T O B E R | 7 | Total Eclipse | Black Moon | - |
| O C T O B E R | 7 | Countrysides | Cracker | - |
| O C T O B E R | 7 | Decade of the Nail Spiked Bat | Jag Panzer | Compilation |
| O C T O B E R | 7 | Farm Fresh Onions | Robert Earl Keen | - |
| O C T O B E R | 7 | Greatest Hits | Wyclef Jean | Compilation |
| O C T O B E R | 7 | Hope | Non-Prophets | - |
| O C T O B E R | 7 | In Keeping Secrets of Silent Earth: 3 | Coheed and Cambria | - |
| O C T O B E R | 7 | Katonah | Apollo Sunshine | - |
| O C T O B E R | 7 | A Kiss in Time | Patty Griffin | - |
| O C T O B E R | 7 | Later That Day | Lyrics Born | - |
| O C T O B E R | 7 | The Lemon of Pink | The Books | - |
| O C T O B E R | 7 | Live at the House of Blues | Guttermouth | Live/DVD |
| O C T O B E R | 7 | Loses Control | Hey Mercedes | - |
| O C T O B E R | 7 | Make the Clocks Move | Kevin Devine | - |
| O C T O B E R | 7 | Nu-Mixx Klazzics | 2Pac | Remix |
| O C T O B E R | 7 | Reflections | Paul van Dyk | - |
| O C T O B E R | 7 | The Room's Too Cold | The Early November | - |
| O C T O B E R | 7 | Santamental | Steve Lukather | - |
| O C T O B E R | 7 | Seasons | Sevendust | - |
| O C T O B E R | 7 | The Second Decade (1993–2003) | Michael W. Smith | Compilation |
| O C T O B E R | 7 | The Second Great Awakening | Fireball Ministry | - |
| O C T O B E R | 7 | Shadow Zone | Static-X | - |
| O C T O B E R | 7 | Softcore Jukebox | Ladytron | Compilation |
| O C T O B E R | 7 | Stone Deaf Forever! | Motörhead | Box Set |
| O C T O B E R | 7 | The Struggle | Cappadonna | - |
| O C T O B E R | 7 | Transatlanticism | Death Cab for Cutie | - |
| O C T O B E R | 7 | West Koasta Nostra | Boo-Yaa T.R.I.B.E. | - |
| O C T O B E R | 8 | And the Story Goes | Agnes Monica | - |
| O C T O B E R | 11 | 12 Memories | Travis | - |
| O C T O B E R | 13 | The Curse of Blondie | Blondie | - |
| O C T O B E R | 13 | Intoxicated | Gracia | - |
| O C T O B E R | 13 | It All Starts Here | Jem | EP |
| O C T O B E R | 13 | Morning Sci-Fi | Hybrid | |
| O C T O B E R | 13 | 1 Fille & 4 Types | Celine Dion | - |
| O C T O B E R | 14 | As Time Goes By: The Great American Songbook, Volume II | Rod Stewart | Covers album |
| O C T O B E R | 14 | Blackberry Belle | The Twilight Singers | - |
| O C T O B E R | 14 | Boy in Da Corner | Dizzee Rascal | - |
| O C T O B E R | 14 | Bucketheadland 2 | Buckethead | - |
| O C T O B E R | 14 | Careful What You Wish For | Texas | - |
| O C T O B E R | 14 | Catharsis | Yob | - |
| O C T O B E R | 14 | Christmas Is Almost Here Again | Carly Simon | Christmas |
| O C T O B E R | 14 | Chrome, Smoke & BBQ | ZZ Top | Box Set |
| O C T O B E R | 14 | Comfort Woman | Meshell Ndegeocello | - |
| O C T O B E R | 14 | Coral Fang | The Distillers | - |
| O C T O B E R | 14 | The Essential Simon & Garfunkel | Simon & Garfunkel | Compilation |
| O C T O B E R | 14 | Ember to Inferno | Trivium | - |
| O C T O B E R | 14 | For Never and Ever | Kill Hannah | - |
| O C T O B E R | 14 | Hard | Jagged Edge | - |
| O C T O B E R | 14 | Honesty | Rodney Atkins | - |
| O C T O B E R | 14 | The Illustrated Band | Vida Blue | - |
| O C T O B E R | 14 | Just Because I'm a Woman: Songs of Dolly Parton | Various Artists | Dolly Parton tribute |
| O C T O B E R | 14 | Long Black Train | Josh Turner | - |
| O C T O B E R | 14 | Measure of a Man | Clay Aiken | - |
| O C T O B E R | 14 | The Movie Album | Barbra Streisand | - |
| O C T O B E R | 14 | The Remixes | Mariah Carey | Remix |
| O C T O B E R | 14 | XIII | Mushroomhead | - |
| O C T O B E R | 14 | All Got Our Runnins | The Streets | EP |
| O C T O B E R | 16 | The Crusader | Scribe | - |
| O C T O B E R | 16 | Mój czas | Patrycja Markowska | - |
| O C T O B E R | 17 | One Crimson Night | HammerFall | Live |
| O C T O B E R | 18 | Being Somebody | Liberty X | UK |
| O C T O B E R | 19 | Infame | Babasónicos | - |
| O C T O B E R | 20 | Country Life | Show of Hands | - |
| O C T O B E R | 20 | Frank | Amy Winehouse | - |
| O C T O B E R | 20 | Hái! | The Creatures | - |
| O C T O B E R | 20 | Kish Kash | Basement Jaxx | - |
| O C T O B E R | 20 | Singles | Suede | Compilation |
| O C T O B E R | 21 | Astronomy | Bleach | - |
| O C T O B E R | 21 | Choirs of the Eye | Kayo Dot | - |
| O C T O B E R | 21 | Chutes Too Narrow | The Shins | - |
| O C T O B E R | 21 | Come Feel Me Tremble | Paul Westerberg | - |
| O C T O B E R | 21 | Coverage | Mandy Moore | Covers album |
| O C T O B E R | 21 | Ethernaut | The Crüxshadows | - |
| O C T O B E R | 21 | Everything to Everyone | Barenaked Ladies | - |
| O C T O B E R | 21 | Group Therapy | Dope | - |
| O C T O B E R | 21 | Interventions + Lullabies | The Format | - |
| O C T O B E R | 21 | In What Language? | Vijay Iyer and Mike Ladd | - |
| O C T O B E R | 21 | Kickin' It at the Barn | Little Feat | - |
| O C T O B E R | 21 | Lambhouse: The Collection 1991–1998 | Unsane | Compilation |
| O C T O B E R | 21 | Logic Will Break Your Heart | The Stills | - |
| O C T O B E R | 21 | MFZB | Zebrahead | - |
| O C T O B E R | 21 | MH | Marques Houston | - |
| O C T O B E R | 21 | Neurosis & Jarboe | Neurosis & Jarboe | - |
| O C T O B E R | 21 | North | Something Corporate | - |
| O C T O B E R | 21 | Puss 'n' Boots | Crash Test Dummies | - |
| O C T O B E R | 21 | Rush in Rio | Rush | Live/DVD |
| O C T O B E R | 21 | The Silent Circus | Between the Buried and Me | - |
| O C T O B E R | 21 | Streetcore | Joe Strummer & The Mescaleros | - |
| O C T O B E R | 21 | Sweat Lodge Infinite | 2Mex | - |
| O C T O B E R | 21 | The Terror State | Anti-Flag | - |
| O C T O B E R | 21 | Twentysomething | Jamie Cullum | - |
| O C T O B E R | 21 | The Very Best Of | Eagles | Compilation |
| O C T O B E R | 21 | A Very Special Acoustic Christmas | Various Artists | Christmas |
| O C T O B E R | 21 | We Sweat Blood | Danko Jones | - |
| O C T O B E R | 21 | What's Wrong With This Picture? | Van Morrison | - |
| O C T O B E R | 21 | Who Will Cut Our Hair When We're Gone? | The Unicorns | - |
| O C T O B E R | 22 | The Flag of Punishment | Galneryus | - |
| O C T O B E R | 22 | Paradinome: Koi ni Mi o Yudanete | Kaori Iida | - |
| O C T O B E R | 24 | The Cat Empire | The Cat Empire | - |
| O C T O B E R | 27 | Balacobaco | Rita Lee | - |
| O C T O B E R | 27 | Lost & Found: Hip Hop Underground Soul Classics | Pete Rock | Compilation |
| O C T O B E R | 27 | Bodysong | Jonny Greenwood | Soundtrack; UK |
| O C T O B E R | 27 | Forget Yourself | The Church | - |
| O C T O B E R | 27 | In Time: The Best of R.E.M. 1988–2003 | R.E.M. | Compilation; UK |
| O C T O B E R | 27 | The Real New Fall LP (Formerly Country on the Click) | The Fall | UK |
| O C T O B E R | 27 | Three | Sugababes | UK |
| O C T O B E R | 27 | Shoot from the Hip | Sophie Ellis-Bextor | UK |
| O C T O B E R | 27 | Through the Ashes of Empires | Machine Head | UK |
| O C T O B E R | 28 | At Crystal Palace | Erase Errata | - |
| O C T O B E R | 28 | December | The Moody Blues | - |
| O C T O B E R | 28 | DevilDriver | DevilDriver | - |
| O C T O B E R | 28 | Harry for the Holidays | Harry Connick Jr. | Christmas |
| O C T O B E R | 28 | Hits! – The Very Best of Erasure | Erasure | Compilation |
| O C T O B E R | 28 | Modern Artillery | The Living End | - |
| O C T O B E R | 28 | Must I Paint You a Picture? The Essential Billy Bragg | Billy Bragg | Compilation |
| O C T O B E R | 28 | Muted | Alias | - |
| O C T O B E R | 28 | The Rise of Brutality | Hatebreed | - |
| O C T O B E R | 28 | Room on Fire | The Strokes | - |
| O C T O B E R | 28 | Ultimate Run-D.M.C. | Run-D.M.C. | Compilation |
| O C T O B E R | 29 | Veneer | José González | Debut |
| O C T O B E R | 31 | Another Way | Teenage Bottlerocket | Debut |
| O C T O B E R | 31 | Pinball Mars | Circus Devils | - |
| N O V E M B E R | 1 | The Journey Continues | Bradley Joseph | - |
| N O V E M B E R | 2 | Films About Ghosts | Counting Crows | Compilation |
| N O V E M B E R | 3 | Against Me! as the Eternal Cowboy | Against Me! | - |
| N O V E M B E R | 3 | Guilty | Blue | UK |
| N O V E M B E R | 3 | Hit | Peter Gabriel | Compilation |
| N O V E M B E R | 3 | In Your Own Time | Mark Owen | - |
| N O V E M B E R | 3 | Love Is Hell pt. 1 | Ryan Adams | EP |
| N O V E M B E R | 3 | A Natural Disaster | Anathema | UK |
| N O V E M B E R | 3 | Severance | Daysend | - |
| N O V E M B E R | 3 | Underworld 1992–2002 | Underworld | Compilation |
| N O V E M B E R | 4 | 15 Year Killing Spree | Cannibal Corpse | Compilation |
| N O V E M B E R | 4 | Afterglow | Sarah McLachlan | - |
| N O V E M B E R | 4 | Australasia | Pelican | Debut |
| N O V E M B E R | 4 | Avril Lavigne: My World | Avril Lavigne | Live |
| N O V E M B E R | 4 | Blood in My Eye | Ja Rule | - |
| N O V E M B E R | 4 | Choronzon | Akercocke | - |
| N O V E M B E R | 4 | Come Poop with Me | Triumph the Insult Comic Dog | - |
| N O V E M B E R | 4 | Deck the Halls, Bruise Your Hand | Relient K | Christmas |
| N O V E M B E R | 4 | Dinosaur Sounds | Catch 22 | - |
| N O V E M B E R | 4 | The Earth Is Not a Cold Dead Place | Explosions in the Sky | - |
| N O V E M B E R | 4 | Elements Pt. 2 | Stratovarius | - |
| N O V E M B E R | 4 | The Fall of Troy | The Fall of Troy | - |
| N O V E M B E R | 4 | Ghosts of the Great Highway | Sun Kil Moon | - |
| N O V E M B E R | 4 | The Glad Fact | Dirty Projectors | - |
| N O V E M B E R | 4 | Here Comes That Weird Chill | Mark Lanegan | EP |
| N O V E M B E R | 4 | Live 2003 | Coldplay | US; Live |
| N O V E M B E R | 4 | Married to the Game | Too Short | - |
| N O V E M B E R | 4 | The Matrix Revolutions: Music from the Motion Picture | Don Davis | Soundtrack |
| N O V E M B E R | 4 | Most Requested Hits | Aaron Carter | Compilation |
| N O V E M B E R | 4 | Now That's What I Call Music! 14 (U.S. series) | Various Artists | Compilation |
| N O V E M B E R | 4 | One A.M. | Diverse | Debut |
| N O V E M B E R | 4 | Payable on Death | P.O.D. | - |
| N O V E M B E R | 4 | The Preacher's Son | Wyclef Jean | - |
| N O V E M B E R | 4 | Purple on Time | U.S. Maple | - |
| N O V E M B E R | 4 | Rock n Roll | Ryan Adams | - |
| N O V E M B E R | 4 | The Sceptre of Deception | Falconer | - |
| N O V E M B E R | 4 | Scorpio Rising | Prong | - |
| N O V E M B E R | 4 | Shock'n Y'all | Toby Keith | - |
| N O V E M B E R | 4 | Sixty Six to Timbuktu | Robert Plant | Compilation |
| N O V E M B E R | 4 | Skull Ring | Iggy Pop | - |
| N O V E M B E R | 4 | This Is Hell | Dimension Zero | - |
| N O V E M B E R | 4 | This Left Feels Right | Bon Jovi | Compilation |
| N O V E M B E R | 4 | Ultimate Toni Braxton | Toni Braxton | Compilation |
| N O V E M B E R | 4 | The Very Best of Sheryl Crow | Sheryl Crow | Compilation |
| N O V E M B E R | 5 | Smoking Monkey | Jonathan Coulton | - |
| N O V E M B E R | 6 | Love | Mika Nakashima | - |
| N O V E M B E R | 7 | Salvation Lies Within | Faith | - |
| N O V E M B E R | 10 | Back at the Velvet Lounge | Fred Anderson | Live |
| N O V E M B E R | 10 | The Bridge | Shaye | - |
| N O V E M B E R | 10 | Ladies Night | Atomic Kitten | - |
| N O V E M B E R | 10 | Late Night Tales: Jamiroquai | Jamiroquai | Compilation |
| N O V E M B E R | 10 | Live from Faraway Stables | Silverchair | Live |
| N O V E M B E R | 10 | Première | New Brunswick Youth Orchestra | - |
| N O V E M B E R | 10 | State of Mind | Holly Valance | - |
| N O V E M B E R | 11 | Another 700 Miles | 3 Doors Down | EP |
| N O V E M B E R | 11 | Bigger Than My Imagination | Michael Gungor | - |
| N O V E M B E R | 11 | Closer | Josh Groban | - |
| N O V E M B E R | 11 | The Essential Bruce Springsteen | Bruce Springsteen | Compilation |
| N O V E M B E R | 11 | Kid Rock | Kid Rock | - |
| N O V E M B E R | 11 | Live from the Road | Chevelle | Live |
| N O V E M B E R | 11 | Lost Dogs | Pearl Jam | Compilation |
| N O V E M B E R | 11 | SoulO | Nick Lachey | - |
| N O V E M B E R | 11 | Soundtrack to the Apocalypse | Slayer | Box Set |
| N O V E M B E R | 11 | Thank You | Stone Temple Pilots | Compilation |
| N O V E M B E R | 11 | Train of Thought | Dream Theater | - |
| N O V E M B E R | 11 | Try This | Pink | - |
| N O V E M B E R | 11 | Tupac: Resurrection | Tupac Shakur | Soundtrack |
| N O V E M B E R | 14 | Beg for Mercy | G-Unit | - |
| N O V E M B E R | 14 | The Black Album | Jay-Z | - |
| N O V E M B E R | 14 | Louis XIV | Louis XIV | - |
| N O V E M B E R | 14 | Songs to Burn Your Bridges By | Project 86 | - |
| N O V E M B E R | 15 | The Morning Never Came | Swallow the Sun | Debut album |
| N O V E M B E R | 17 | Concert for George | Various Artists | George Harrison Tribute |
| N O V E M B E R | 17 | Ether Song | Turin Brakes | - |
| N O V E M B E R | 17 | Let It Be... Naked | The Beatles | Remix |
| N O V E M B E R | 17 | Now That's What I Call Music! 56 (UK series) | Various Artists | Compilation |
| N O V E M B E R | 17 | A Present for Everyone | Busted | - |
| N O V E M B E R | 17 | Tales of a Librarian | Tori Amos | Compilation |
| N O V E M B E R | 17 | Turn It On | Ronan Keating | - |
| N O V E M B E R | 18 | Ashanti's Christmas | Ashanti | Christmas |
| N O V E M B E R | 18 | At Last | Cyndi Lauper | - |
| N O V E M B E R | 18 | Blink-182 | Blink-182 | - |
| N O V E M B E R | 18 | Body Language | Kylie Minogue | - |
| N O V E M B E R | 18 | Born Innocent | The Proclaimers | - |
| N O V E M B E R | 18 | The Central Park Concert | Dave Matthews Band | Live/DVD |
| N O V E M B E R | 18 | Collide | Skillet | - |
| N O V E M B E R | 18 | 18 B Sides + DVD | Moby | Compilation & DVD |
| N O V E M B E R | 18 | The Electric Joe Satriani: An Anthology | Joe Satriani | Compilation |
| N O V E M B E R | 18 | Greatest Hits | Red Hot Chili Peppers | Compilation |
| N O V E M B E R | 18 | Greatest Hits | LeAnn Rimes | Compilation |
| N O V E M B E R | 18 | Heavy | Swollen Members | - |
| N O V E M B E R | 18 | I Can't Stop | Al Green | - |
| N O V E M B E R | 18 | I'm One of You | Hank Williams Jr. | - |
| N O V E M B E R | 18 | In the Zone | Britney Spears | US |
| N O V E M B E R | 18 | The Infinite Steve Vai: An Anthology | Steve Vai | Compilation |
| N O V E M B E R | 18 | Live in Texas | Linkin Park | Live DVD |
| N O V E M B E R | 18 | Maryland Mansions | Cex | - |
| N O V E M B E R | 18 | Number Ones | Michael Jackson | Compilation |
| N O V E M B E R | 18 | One Wish: The Holiday Album | Whitney Houston | Christmas |
| N O V E M B E R | 18 | Revolutionary Vol. 2 | Immortal Technique | - |
| N O V E M B E R | 18 | Room To Breathe | Reba McEntire | - |
| N O V E M B E R | 18 | Under Construction, Part II | Timbaland & Magoo | - |
| N O V E M B E R | 18 | Weekend Warrior | Biz Markie | - |
| N O V E M B E R | 19 | Kimi Tsunagi Five M | Asian Kung-Fu Generation | - |
| N O V E M B E R | 21 | Take a Look in the Mirror | Korn | - |
| N O V E M B E R | 22 | All Request Live | Ween | Live |
| N O V E M B E R | 23 | Call Off the Search | Katie Melua | UK |
| N O V E M B E R | 24 | Dedicated | Lemar | - |
| N O V E M B E R | 24 | Introduction | Alex Parks | - |
| N O V E M B E R | 24 | Lucifer Incestus | Belphegor | - |
| N O V E M B E R | 24 | Pop Art: Pet Shop Boys - The Hits | Pet Shop Boys | Compilation |
| N O V E M B E R | 24 | Remixed & Revisited | Madonna | Remix + 1 new track |
| N O V E M B E R | 24 | The Soul Sessions | Joss Stone | UK |
| N O V E M B E R | 24 | Turnaround | Westlife | - |
| N O V E M B E R | 25 | 7 | Enrique Iglesias | - |
| N O V E M B E R | 25 | Blitzen Trapper | Blitzen Trapper | - |
| N O V E M B E R | 25 | Da Derrty Versions: The Reinvention | Nelly | Remix |
| N O V E M B E R | 25 | Elocation | Default | - |
| N O V E M B E R | 25 | Folklore | Nelly Furtado | - |
| N O V E M B E R | 25 | Leave Luck to Heaven | Matthew Dear | Debut |
| N O V E M B E R | 25 | Life on Display | Puddle of Mudd | - |
| N O V E M B E R | 25 | Live at the Grand Olympic Auditorium | Rage Against the Machine | Live |
| N O V E M B E R | 25 | The Make Yourself at Home EP | The Starting Line | EP |
| N O V E M B E R | 25 | Now & Forever: The Hits | TLC | UK; Compilation |
| N O V E M B E R | 25 | Part II | Lil Jon & the East Side Boyz | - |
| N O V E M B E R | 25 | The Singles 1992–2003 | No Doubt | Compilation +1 new track |
| N O V E M B E R | 25 | This Is Not a Test! | Missy Elliott | - |
| N O V E M B E R | 25 | Unearthed | Johnny Cash | Box Set |
| N O V E M B E R | 26 | The Hit Parade | Tak Matsumoto | Covers album |
| N O V E M B E R | 26 | Jade Forward | Jade Kwan | - |
| N O V E M B E R | 29 | Happiness | The Weepies | - |
| D E C E M B E R | 1 | Daft Club | Daft Punk | Remix |
| D E C E M B E R | 1 | Mach 6 | MC Solaar | - |
| D E C E M B E R | 1 | When Goodbye Means Forever... | I Killed the Prom Queen | - |
| D E C E M B E R | 2 | And Then... | Joe | - |
| D E C E M B E R | 2 | Comin' on Strong | Trace Adkins | - |
| D E C E M B E R | 2 | My First Time | Look What I Did | - |
| D E C E M B E R | 2 | My Own Thing | Manafest | - |
| D E C E M B E R | 2 | The Diary of Alicia Keys | Alicia Keys | US |
| D E C E M B E R | 3 | 666 | Hyde | |
| D E C E M B E R | 3 | CONTROL Your touch | Yumi Shizukusa | - |
| D E C E M B E R | 8 | Just as I Am | Guy Sebastian | - |
| D E C E M B E R | 8 | Lichtspielhaus | Rammstein | DVD |
| D E C E M B E R | 8 | Strachy na Lachy | Strachy na Lachy | - |
| D E C E M B E R | 9 | Big Money Heavyweight | Big Tymers | - |
| D E C E M B E R | 9 | Cold Mountain | Various Artists | Soundtrack |
| D E C E M B E R | 9 | Tha Dogg: Best of the Works | Snoop Dogg | Compilation |
| D E C E M B E R | 9 | Fefe Dobson | Fefe Dobson | - |
| D E C E M B E R | 9 | Home | Ryan Malcolm | - |
| D E C E M B E R | 9 | Hot & Wet | 112 | - |
| D E C E M B E R | 9 | Live at Brixton Academy | Motörhead | Live |
| D E C E M B E R | 9 | Love Is Hell pt. 2 | Ryan Adams | EP |
| D E C E M B E R | 9 | Nick Cannon | Nick Cannon | - |
| D E C E M B E R | 9 | The Reason | Hoobastank | - |
| D E C E M B E R | 9 | Soulful | Ruben Studdard | - |
| D E C E M B E R | 9 | Soulstar | Musiq | - |
| D E C E M B E R | 9 | Splinter | The Offspring | - |
| D E C E M B E R | 9 | Tasty | Kelis | - |
| D E C E M B E R | 9 | Terrorist Threats | Westside Connection | - |
| D E C E M B E R | 12 | Atarashiki Nihongo Rock no Michi to Hikari | Sambomaster | - |
| D E C E M B E R | 12 | These Days Will Fade | Moments in Grace | EP |
| D E C E M B E R | 16 | Extended Play | Denver Harbor | EP |
| D E C E M B E R | 16 | The Lex Diamond Story | Raekwon | - |
| D E C E M B E R | 16 | M.A.D.E. | Memphis Bleek | - |
| D E C E M B E R | 17 | Legendary | Zao | Compilation |
| D E C E M B E R | 17 | Memorial Address | Ayumi Hamasaki | EP |
| D E C E M B E R | 23 | Juve the Great | Juvenile | - |
| D E C E M B E R | 23 | MTA2: Baptized in Dirty Water | David Banner | - |
| D E C E M B E R | 23 | Riffs | Status Quo | - |
| D E C E M B E R | 25 | Ultimate Circus | Nightmare | - |
| D E C E M B E R | 27 | I Look I See | Yusuf Islam | - |
| D E C E M B E R | 31 | Porch Life | Big D and the Kids Table | - |

== Release date unknown ==
- Bootlegged, Distorted, Remixed and Uploaded – Pitchshifter
- First Demo Tape – Minor Threat || EP
- Kill Sound Before Sound Kills You – Kid 606
- Live from the Gaiety – The Dubliners (live)
- Natural Wonder - Phoebe Snow
- The Sauce – Eddie Spaghetti
- Still Electric – Primitive Radio Gods
- Stories From Hollywood - Simon Dawes
- Strawberry Bubblegum – 10cc – Compilation
- To Madagascar and Back EP/DVD – Flickerstick
- Try Honesty / Living in the Shadows EP – Billy Talent
- Watching the Snow – Michael Franks (Japanese release)
- Worn Copy – Ariel Pink

== Top 5 albums of Billboard year ==
1. 50 Cent – Get Rich or Die Tryin'
2. Norah Jones – Come Away With Me
3. Beyoncé – Dangerously in Love
4. Michael Jackson – Number Ones
5. Dixie Chicks – Home

=== Top 10 Selling Albums of the Year US ===
1. Get Rich or Die Tryin' – 50 Cent
2. Come Away with Me – Norah Jones
3. Stripped – Christina Aguilera
4. Number Ones – Michael Jackson
5. Meteora – Linkin Park
6. Dangerously in Love – Beyoncé
7. A Rush of Blood to the Head – Coldplay
8. Fallen – Evanescence
9. In the Zone – Britney Spears
10. Let Go – Avril Lavigne

== Popular songs ==
- "'03 Bonnie & Clyde" – Jay-Z featuring Beyoncé
- "2+2=5" – Radiohead
- "21 Questions" – 50 Cent
- "45" – Shinedown
- "Addicted" – Simple Plan
- "Aïcha" – Outlandish
- "The Anthem" – Good Charlotte
- "All I Have" – Jennifer Lopez featuring LL Cool J
- "American Life" – Madonna
- "Are You Gonna Be My Girl" – Jet
- "Baby Boy" – Beyoncé featuring Sean Paul
- "Be Mine" – David Gray
- "Beautiful" – Christina Aguilera
- "The Beautiful Occupation" – Travis
- "Behind Blue Eyes" – Limp Bizkit
- "Born to Try" – Delta Goodrem
- "Bounce" – Bon Jovi
- "Breathe" – Blu Cantrell featuring Sean Paul
- "Bring Me to Life" – Evanescence
- "Business" – Eminem
- "California" – Phantom Planet
- "Cannonball" – Damien Rice
- "Can't Hold Us Down" – Christina Aguilera featuring Lil' Kim
- "Can't Stop" – Red Hot Chili Peppers
- "Cassé" – Nolwenn Leroy
- "Chihuahua" – DJ Bobo
- "Christmas Time (Don't Let the Bells End)" – The Darkness
- "Clocks" – Coldplay
- "Come Into My World" - Kylie Minogue
- "Colors" – Hikaru Utada
- "Come Over" – Aaliyah
- "Crazy in Love" – Beyoncé
- "Cry Me a River" – Justin Timberlake
- "Did My Time" – Korn
- "Dilemma" – Nelly featuring Kelly Rowland
- "Dirrty" – Christina Aguilera featuring Redman
- "Don't Wanna Lose This Feeling" – Dannii Minogue
- "Dude" – Beenie Man feat. Ms. Thing
- "Entre Nous" – Chimène Badi
- "Everyway That I Can" – Sertab Erener
- "Faint" – Linkin Park
- "Fan" – Pascal Obispo
- "Feel" – Robbie Williams
- "Feel Good Time" – Pink featuring William Ørbit
- "Feeling This" – Blink-182
- "Fighter" – Christina Aguilera
- "Flying Without Wings" – Ruben Studdard
- "For What It's Worth" – The Cardigans
- "Forever and for Always" – Shania Twain
- "Freek-a-Leek" – Petey Pablo
- "Get Busy" – Sean Paul
- "Get Low" – Lil Jon & the East Side Boyz
- "Go to Sleep" – Radiohead
- "God Put A Smile Upon Your Face" – Coldplay
- "Going Under" – Evanescence
- "Girls & Boys" – Good Charlotte
- "Guilty" – Blue
- "Headstrong" – Trapt
- "The Hell Song" – Sum 41
- "Here Without You" – 3 Doors Down
- "Hey Oh" – Tragédie
- "Hey Sexy Lady" – Shaggy featuring Brian and Tony Gold
- "Hey Ya!" – OutKast
- "Hit That" – The Offspring
- "Hold On" – Good Charlotte
- "Honey, This Mirror Isn't Big Enough for the Two of Us" – My Chemical Romance
- "Hurt" – Johnny Cash
- "Hysteria" – Muse
- "I Begin to Wonder" – Dannii Minogue
- "I Believe in a Thing Called Love" – The Darkness
- "I Know What You Want" – Busta Rhymes featuring Mariah Carey
- "If I Can't" – 50 Cent
- "If You Come To Me" – Atomic Kitten
- "I'm with You" – Avril Lavigne
- "In Da Club" – 50 Cent
- "Innocent Eyes" – Delta Goodrem
- "Into the West" – Annie Lennox
- "Into You" – Fabolous featuring Tamia
- "It's My Life" – No Doubt
- "J'en ai marre!" – Alizée
- "Just the Way I'm Feeling" – Feeder
- "Laisse parler les gens" – Jocelyne Labylle and Cheela featuring Jacob Desvarieux and Passi
- "The Last Song" – The All-American Rejects
- "Laura" – Scissor Sisters
- "Le Frunkp" – Alphonse Brown
- "The Leaving Song Pt. II" – AFI
- "Lifestyles of the Rich & Famous" – Good Charlotte
- "Like a Stone" – Audioslave
- "L'Orange" – Star Academy 3
- "Lose Yourself" – Eminem
- "Losing Grip" – Avril Lavigne
- "Lost Without You" – Delta Goodrem
- "Ma Liberté de penser" – Florent Pagny
- "Mad World" – Gary Jules and Michael Andrews
- "Mandy" – Westlife (UK)
- "Maybe Tomorrow" – Stereophonics
- "Me Against the Music" – Britney Spears featuring Madonna
- "Me Myself and I" – Beyoncé
- "Ménage à Trois" – Alcazar
- "Milkshake" – Kelis
- "Minerva" – Deftones
- "Miracles" – Pet Shop Boys
- "Miss Independent" – Kelly Clarkson
- "Miss You" – Aaliyah
- "Mobile" – Avril Lavigne
- "Move Your Feet" – Junior Senior
- "My Immortal" – Evanescence
- "My Love Is Like...Wo" – Mýa
- "Never Leave You (Uh Oooh, Uh Oooh)" – Lumidee
- "No Letting Go" – Wayne Wonder
- "No Good Advice" – Girls Aloud
- "Not a Sinner Nor a Saint" – Alcazar
- "Not Gonna Get Us" – t.A.T.u.
- "Not Me, Not I" – Delta Goodrem
- "Nothing But You" – Paul van Dyk
- "Numb" – Linkin Park
- "One More Chance" – Michael Jackson
- "Out of Control" – Hoobastank
- "Out of Time" – Blur
- "Over My Head (Better Off Dead)" – Sum 41
- "Papi chulo... (te traigo el mmmm...)" – Lorna
- "Paris-Latino" – Star Academy France
- "Perfect" – Simple Plan
- "P.I.M.P." – 50 Cent
- "Price to Play" – Staind
- "Pump It Up" – Joe Budden
- "Punk Rock 101" – Bowling for Soup
- "Rain on Me" – Ashanti
- "The Remedy (I Won't Worry)" – Jason Mraz
- "Remember" – Disturbed
- "Rise & Fall" – Craig David featuring Sting
- "Right Thurr" – Chingy
- "The Road I'm On" – 3 Doors Down
- "Rock wit U (Awww Baby)" – Ashanti
- "Rock Your Body" – Justin Timberlake
- "Satisfaction" – Benny Benassi
- "Señorita" – Justin Timberlake
- "Serenity" – Godsmack
- "Seven Nation Army" – The White Stripes
- "Shake Ya Tailfeather" – Nelly, P. Diddy & Murphy Lee
- "Silver and Cold" – AFI
- "Sing for the Moment" – Eminem
- "So Far Away" – Staind
- "So Yesterday" – Hilary Duff
- "Someday" – Nickelback
- "Somewhere I Belong" – Linkin Park
- "Songbird" – Oasis
- "Sorry Seems to Be the Hardest Word" – Blue featuring Elton John
- "Sorry 2004" – Ruben Studdard
- "Sound of the Underground" – Girls Aloud
- "Special Needs" – Placebo
- "Spitting Games" – Snow Patrol
- "Slow" - Kylie Minogue
- "St. Anger" – Metallica
- "Stacy's Mom" – Fountains of Wayne
- "Still Waiting" – Sum 41
- "Stuck" – Stacie Orrico
- "Stupid Girl" – Cold
- "Such Great Heights" – The Postal Service
- "Summer Jam" – The Underdog Project
- "Superman" – Eminem
- "Sur un air latino" – Lorie
- "Swing, Swing" – The All-American Rejects
- "There There" – Radiohead
- "This Is the Night" – Clay Aiken
- "Time Is Running Out" – Muse
- "Time Stands Still" – The All-American Rejects
- "Times Like These" – Foo Fighters
- "Trouble" – Pink
- "Blue" – Blue
- "Universally Speaking" – Red Hot Chili Peppers
- "Until the Day I Die" – Story of the Year
- "Unwell" – Matchbox Twenty
- "The Voice Within" – Christina Aguilera
- "Way Away" – Yellowcard
- "The Way You Move" – OutKast & Sleepy Brown
- "Where Is the Love?" – The Black Eyed Peas featuring Justin Timberlake
- "White Flag" – Dido
- "Why Can't I?" – Liz Phair
- "Why Not" – Hilary Duff
- "The Wreckoning" – Boomkat
- "Year 3000" – Busted
- "You Said No" – Busted

== Musical theater ==
- Avenue Q – Broadway production ran for 2534 performances (ranked 23rd on the list of all-time Broadway shows)
- Belles belles belles, based on songs by Claude François, with music by Claude François, Jean-Pierre Bourtayre and Carolin Petit and lyrics by Claude François and Daniel Moyne; premiered at Olympia in Paris on November 21
- Bounce – Chicago and Washington D. C. productions
- The Boy from Oz – Broadway production opened at the Imperial Theatre and ran for 365 performances
- Caroline or Change, book and lyrics by Tony Kushner and score by Jeanine Tesori, off-Broadway production
- Fame on 42nd Street – Broadway production opened at the Little Shubert Theatre on November 11 and ran for 264 performances
- The Full Monty – Melbourne production
- Jerry Springer – The Opera – London production
- Joseph and the Amazing Technicolor Dreamcoat – London revival
- Never Gonna Dance – Broadway production opened at the Broadhurst Theatre on December 4 and ran for 84 performances
- Showtune, a Jerry Herman musical revue – off-Broadway production
- Taboo – Broadway production opened November 13 and ran for 103 performances
- Thoroughly Modern Millie – London production opened October 21, starring Amanda Holden, and ran for 8 months
- Tonight's The Night – London production
- Wicked – Broadway production opened at the George Gershwin Theatre on October 30, starring Joel Grey, and is still running as of 2023. It is the fourth-longest-running show in the history of Broadway.

== Musical films ==
- 7:35 in the Morning (Academy Award-nominated short)
- The Adventure of Iron Pussy
- Brother Bear (animated feature)
- Camp
- The Cheetah Girls (Disney Channel Original Movie – the first musical film by Disney Channel, bringing in over 84 million viewers)
- End of the Century: The Story of the Ramones
- Freaky Friday
- From Justin to Kelly
- Interstella 5555: The 5tory of the 5ecret 5tar 5ystem
- The Jungle Book 2 (animated feature)
- Love Under the Sun
- A Mighty Wind
- Pas sur la bouche
- Pop Carn, starring Mohanlal and Simran Bagga
- School of Rock
- The Singing Detective
- Tupac: Resurrection
- Vivir Intentando, starring the group Bandana

== Births ==
- January 1 - Nieve Ella, English singer
- January 6 – MattyBRaps, American rapper
- January 10 – iayze, American rapper
- January 23 – Bishara, Syrian-Swedish singer
- January 24 – Johnny Orlando, Canadian singer-songwriter
- February 10 – Blanco, Italian singer and rapper
- February 20
  - Olivia Rodrigo, American singer-songwriter, musician, activist and actress
  - William Gao, English actor and musician (Wasia Project)
- March 1 - Keshav, tabla prodigy
- March 24 – Mae Stephens, British singer and songwriter
- March 25 – George Alice, Australian singer-songwriter
- March 28 – Pháo, Vietnamese rapper and producer
- April 8 – Sha EK, American rapper
- April 11 – Aksel Rykkvin, Norwegian singer
- April 20 – Kay Flock, American rapper
- April 30 – Mikhail Smirnov, Russian singer-songwriter and actor
- May 19 – JoJo Siwa, American singer dancer, actress, and YouTube personality
- May 20 – OsamaSon, American rapper, songwriter and record producer
- June 27 – Muraki Maito Raul, Japanese singer (Snow Man)
- July 1 – Tate McRae, Canadian singer, songwriter, musician and dancer
- July 4 – Polina Bogusevich, Russian singer
- July 9 – Savannah Clarke, Australian singer (Now United)
- August 17 – The Kid Laroi, Australian singer
- August 21 – Natalie Ho, Hong Kong singer (STRAYZ)
- September 1 – Yujin, South Korean singer (IVE)
- September 16 - Claude Kiambe, Congolese-born Dutch singer-songwriter
- September 18 – Aidan Gallagher, American actor and musician
- September 26 - Jane Remover, American musical artist
- September 28 - Lauren Spencer-Smith, British-born Canadian singer and songwriter
- October 5 - Eden Golan, Russian-Israeli singer
- October 9 – Landon Barker, American singer and rapper son of Travis Barker
- October 21 – Azanti, Nigerian singer and songwriter
- October 23 – Xaviersobased, American rapper and record producer
- October 28 – Beatrice Millie McCartney, daughter of Paul McCartney and Heather Mills. The McCartneys fooled the press into publishing misleading details about the birth
- November 16 - Ana Castela, Brazilian singer and songwriter
- November 21 - Sohee, South Korean singer (Riize)
- November 27 - Adéla, Slovak singer, songwriter and dancer
- November 29 - Yung Kayo, American rapper
- December 2 – SSGKobe, American rapper
- December 5 – Logan Robot Gladden, American drummer, singer, songwriter, musician, and record producer
- December 9 – Yuna, South Korean singer and dancer (Itzy)
- Unknown - Schafter, Polish rapper, singer, music producer, music video director and songwriter

== Deaths ==
- January 1 – Giorgio Gaber (63), actor, singer-songwriter
- January 5
  - Gonzalo Brenes (95), Panamanian composer, musicologist, folk-song collector, music educator, and politician
  - Doreen Carwithen (80), composer
  - Daphne Oram (77), electronic musician and compopser
- January 6 – Hirini Melbourne (53), New Zealand singer-songwriter and poet
- January 8 – Ron Goodwin (77), composer and conductor
- January 11 – Mickey Finn (55), bongo player and T.Rex sideman (liver failure)
- January 12 – Maurice Gibb (53), Bee Gees singer and bassist (intestinal complications)
- January 15 – Doris Fisher (87), singer-songwriter
- January 23 – Nell Carter (54), singer and actress (heart disease)
- February 1 – Mongo Santamaría (80), Latin jazz percussionist
- February 2
  - Vincent "Randy" Chin (65), Jamaican record producer
  - Lou Harrison (85), composer
- February 4 – Charlie Biddle, American-Canadian bassist, 76
- February 11 – Moses Hogan (55), American pianist and composer
- February 16 – Rusty Magee (47), American actor and composer
- February 19 – Johnny Paycheck (64), country singer
- February 20 – Ty Longley (31), guitarist of Great White (fire accident)
- February 23 – Howie Epstein (47), bassist for Tom Petty and the Heartbreakers
- February 26 – Othar Turner (95), fife player
- March 3
  - Hank Ballard (75), R&B singer (throat cancer)
  - Malcolm Williamson (71), Australian composer, Master of the Queen's Music
- March 4 – Celly Campello (60), Brazilian singer-songwriter and actress (breast cancer)
- March 8 – Adam Faith (62), singer, actor (heart attack)
- April 1 – Leslie Cheung (46), actor, musician (suicide)
- April 2 – Edwin Starr (61), soul singer (heart attack)
- April 6 – Babatunde Olatunji (75), drummer (diabetes)
- April 10 – Little Eva (59), singer (cervical cancer)
- April 17 – Earl King (69), blues musician
- April 19 – Conrad Leonard (104), composer and pianist
- April 20 – Teddy Edwards (78), jazz saxophonist
- April 21 – Nina Simone (70), singer and pianist
- April 22 – Felice Bryant (77), Hall of Fame songwriter
- May 4 – Arthur Oldham (76), composer and choirmaster
- May 11 – Noel Redding (57), bassist of The Jimi Hendrix Experience (cirrhosis)
- May 15 – June Carter Cash (73), musician and singer
- May 19 – Ivo Žídek (76), operatic tenor
- May 25 – Jeremy Ward (27), sound technician and guitarist
- May 27 – Luciano Berio (77), composer
- May 30 – Mickie Most (64), record producer (mesothelioma)
- June 2 – Danka Firfova (85), Macedonian soprano
- June 6 – Dave Rowberry (63), keyboardist (The Animals) (ulcer haemorrhage)
- June 17 – Marcella Pobbé (81), operatic soprano
- July 1 – Herbie Mann (73), jazz flautist (prostate cancer)
- July 3 – Skip Scarborough (58), songwriter
- July 4
  - André Claveau (87), singer
  - Barry White (58), singer and record producer (renal failure)
- July 5 – Bebu Silvetti (59), pianist, composer, arranger and record producer (respiratory failure)
- July 6
  - Skip Battin (69), singer-songwriter and bassist
  - Buddy Ebsen (95), actor and singer
- July 7 – Izhak Graziani (79), conductor
- July 12 – Benny Carter (95), jazz saxophonist, composer, arranger and bandleader (bronchitis)
- July 13 – Compay Segundo (95), Cuban guitarist, singer and composer
- July 16 – Celia Cruz (77), salsa singer (brain tumor)
- July 17 – Rosalyn Tureck (89), pianist
- July 25 – Erik Braunn (52), guitarist Iron Butterfly (heart attack)
- July 26 – Richard Wayne Dirksen (81), organist and choirmaster
- July 27 – Bob Hope (100), actor, comedian and singer
- July 30 – Sam Philips (80), producer and founder of Sun Records
- August 2 – Don Estelle (70), actor and singer
- August 5 – Tite Curet Alonso (77), songwriter (heart attack)
- August 6 – Julius Baker (87), flautist
- August 9 – Gregory Hines (58), actor, singer and dancer (liver cancer)
- August 10 – Carmita Jiménez, singer
- August 13 – Ed Townsend (74), singer-songwriter
- August 15 – Robert Moulson (70), operatic tenor
- August 18 – Tony Jackson (55), singer and bass player (The Searchers)
- August 21 – Wesley Willis (40), novelty musician
- August 23 – Imperio Argentina (96), singer and actress
- September 4
  - Lola Bobesco (82), violinist
  - Susan Chilcott (40), operatic soprano (breast cancer)
  - Tibor Varga (82), violinist and conductor
- September 5 – Gisele MacKenzie (76), singer
- September 7 – Warren Zevon (56), rock and roll singer (mesothelioma)
- September 12 – Johnny Cash (71), country and rock 'n roll singer
- September 14 – John Serry, Sr. (88) concert accordionist, organist, composer, arranger
- September 19 – Slim Dusty (76), country singer
- September 25 – Matthew Jay (24), English singer-songwriter
- September 26 – Robert Palmer (54), singer (heart attack)
- September 27 – Donald O'Connor (78), actor, singer and dancer (congestive heart failure)
- September 30 – Ronnie Dawson (64), rockabilly singer and guitarist
- October 5 – Denis Quilley (75), actor and singer (liver cancer)
- October 10 – Eugene Istomin (77), pianist (liver cancer)
- October 21 – Elliott Smith (34), singer-songwriter
- October 22 – Gabriella Gatti (95), operatic soprano
- October 23 – Tony Capstick (59), comedian, actor and musician
- October 24 – Rosie Nix Adams (45), singer-songwriter
- October 25 – Robert Strassburg (88), composer, educator, musicologist
- October 26 – Carolyn Smith-Meyer (68), American operatic soprano
- October 29 – Franco Corelli (82), operatic tenor
- October 30 – Franco Bonisolli (65), operatic tenor
- November 5 – Bobby Hatfield (63), singer (The Righteous Brothers)
- November 9 – Buddy Arnold (77), jazz saxophonist
- November 12 – Tony Thompson (48), drummer of Chic (kidney cancer)
- November 14 – Gene Anthony Ray (41), actor and dancer (complications of a stroke)
- November 15
  - Dorothy Loudon (70), actress and singer
  - Speedy West (79), American guitarist and producer (b. 1924)
- November 17
  - Arthur Conley (57), soul singer (intestinal cancer)
  - Don Gibson (75), country musician
  - Peter Lindroos (59), Finnish operatic tenor (car accident)
- November 18 – Michael Kamen (55), composer, conductor and musician (heart attack)
- November 19 – Greg Ridley (56), English bassist (Humble Pie)
- November 26 – Soulja Slim (26), rapper (homicide)
- November 28 – Thekra, Tunisian singer (murdered by her husband)
- December 8 – Rubén González (84), pianist
- December 16 – Gary Stewart (59), country singer (suicide)
- December 22 – Dave Dudley (75), country singer (heart attack)
- December 27 – Vestal Goodman (74), gospel singer (influenza complications)
- December 30 – Anita Mui (40), Hong Kong pop singer
- December 31 – Sieglinde Wagner (82), operatic contralto

== Awards ==
The following artists are inducted into the Rock and Roll Hall of Fame: AC/DC, The Clash, Elvis Costello & the Attractions, The Police, The Righteous Brothers

=== Miscellaneous ===
- Leonard Cohen is made a Companion of the Order of Canada, Canada's highest honour.

=== ARIA Music Awards ===
- ARIA Music Awards of 2003

=== Country Music Association Awards ===
- 2003 Country Music Association Awards

=== Eurovision Song Contest ===
- Eurovision Song Contest 2003
- Junior Eurovision Song Contest 2003

=== Grammy Awards ===
- Grammy Awards of 2003

=== Mercury Music Prize ===
- Boy in da Corner – Dizzee Rascal

== Charts ==
=== Triple J Hottest 100 ===
- Triple J Hottest 100, 2003
