= Oops!... I Did It Again =

Oops!... I Did It Again may refer to:

- Oops!... I Did It Again (album) (2000)
  - "Oops!... I Did It Again" (song) (2000)
  - Oops!... I Did It Again Tour
- Oops! I Did It Again: The Best of Britney Spears (2012)
- Oops!...I Did It Again (Remixes and B-Sides), a 2020 compilation album by American singer Britney Spears
- Oops, I Did It Again! (Cex album) (2001)
- "Oops, I Did It Again", a 2004 episode of the American animated series The Powerpuff Girls
