= Vidavox =

US musical group

Vidavox was an instrumental rock band from Miami, Florida. Formed in 2002, "Vidavox drew from jazz, progressive rock, jam band, math rock, and elements of electronica to strike a balance between repetition and development" (CdBaby Reviewer 2005)

Their 2005 self titled release met with positive reviews from the Broward-Palm Beach New Times , Decoymusic.com , babyblaue-seiten.de (in German) , Winterlight (in Japanese)

Vidavox has notably performed with Aloha, Cex, and The Method and Result

They were posthumously awarded "Best Band to Break Up in the Past Year" by the Miami New Times

== History ==
Guitarist Carlos Vega went to art school with guitarist Christian Salazar and drummer James Miller. They played music together in various unorganized forms before the arrival of bassist Arnaldo Gonzalez in Spring 2002, at which point the Vidavox lineup was finalized.

Pre-Vidavox
James Miller played drums with Lose the Rookie and as of 2010 has joined Miami based band Arsenal88.
Christian Salazar played guitar with Milkshed and currently performs electronic and experimental music under the name Datamouth.
Arnaldo Gonzalez played bass and programmed drums with Carnival Waste ;
Gonzalez also played drums and keyboards with Faller

== Members ==
Carlos Vega - guitar, keyboard, bass
James Miller - drums
Arnaldo Gonzalez - bass, guitar, keyboard, shouts
Christian Salazar - guitar, noise

== Discography ==
ALBUMS
Vidavox (2005)

COMPILATIONS
Street Miami 2004 Music Compilation (2004) -- [TRACK: blues and haiku(s)]
