= BR Instrumentals =

Being Ridden Instrumentals

Studio album by Cex
- Released: May 6, 2003 (U.S.)
- Recorded: November 2001 – September 2002
- Genre: IDM, underground rap
- Length: 41:42
- Label: Temporary Residence TRR56
- Producer: ?

Cex chronology
Tall, Dark & Handcuffed (2002)	Being Ridden Instrumentals (2003)	Maryland Mansions (2003)

Professional ratings
Review scores
Source	Rating
Alternative Press	Jul 2003, p.124
Pitchfork Media	71% link
Playlouder	link
Rolling Stone	link
Stylus Magazine	68% link
URB	#234, p.53
The Wire	#234, p.53

BR Instrumentals, sometimes written Being Ridden Instrumentals, is an album by Cex. It is an album of instrumentals from its counterpart Being Ridden. It is his second album to move away from a straight-ahead electronic music sounds and indulge in a more hip-hop based music, sans with rapping by Cex that can be found on Being Ridden.

The album cover is a parody of David Bowie's album cover for his album "Heroes".

== Track listing ==
1. "You Kiss Like You're Dead (Instrumental)" (Kidwell) – 2:21
2. "The Wayback Machine (Instrumental)" (Kidwell) – 3:36
3. "Not Working (Instrumental)" (Kidwell) – 4:21
4. "Signal Katied (Instrumental)" (Kidwell) – 1:49
5. "Earth-Shaking Event (Instrumental)" (Kidwell) – 3:20
6. "Cex at Arm's Length (Instrumental)" (Kidwell) – 2:36
7. "My Hands Switched With Mannequin Hands" (Kidwell) – 4:16
8. "See Ya Never, Sike (Instrumental)" (Kidwell) – 0:19
9. "The Marriage (Instrumental)" (Kidwell) – 3:11
10. "Bad Girls" (Kidwell) – 4:58
11. "Brer Rjyan (Instrumental)" (Kidwell) – 3:30
12. "Dead Bodies (Instrumental)" (Kidwell) – 6:33
13. "M Ren Dvine" (Kidwell) – 0:52

== Trivia ==
The main difference between Being Ridden and BR Instrumentals, except for the duct tape covering Kidwell's mouth, is the track listing. Every track from BR Instrumentals is featured on Being Ridden except My Hands Switched With Mannequin Hands, Bad Girls and M Ren Dvine. These tracks only appear on Being Ridden and are replaced by Stamina, Other Countries and Nevermind. The three songs are on track 7, 10 and 13 on both albums.

An instrumental version of Stamina appears on the Venetian Snares album 2370894.
