= Tall, Dark & Handcuffed =

Studio album by Cex
- Released: October 1, 2002 (U.S.)
- Genre: IDM, underground rap
- Label: Tigerbeat6 meow060
- Producer: Cex

Cex chronology
Oops, I Did It Again! (2001)	Tall, Dark & Handcuffed (2002)	Being Ridden and BR Instrumentals (2003)

Professional ratings
Review scores
Source	Rating
AllMusic	4/5 stars
Spin	3.5/5 stars
UNCUT	3/5 stars

Tall, Dark & Handcuffed is an album by Cex. It is his first album to move away from a straight ahead electronic music sounds and indulge in a more hip-hop based music, complete with rapping by Cex.

== Track listing ==
All tracks are written by Cex.

No.	Title	Music	Length
1.	"Brutal Exposure" (additional vocals by Craig Wedren)		4:51
2.	"One Cex" (additional vocals by Craig Wedren)		3:20
3.	"Gigolo Knights" (additional vocals by Height)		4:33
4.	"Intangible" (turntables by DJ Han)	Shields	3:23
5.	"Bad Acne" (turntables by DJ Fader)		4:05
6.	"Good Morning, Universe"		4:38
7.	"Cuts" (turntables by DJ Fader)		4:21
8.	"K-12 Days of Hell" (turntables by DJ Fader, additional vocals by Height)		4:25
9.	"Jeremy Devine"		0:53
10.	"Ghost Rider"		4:16
11.	"The Childhood of a Leader" (turntables by DJ Fader, additional vocals by Craig Wedren)		3:52
12.	"Petty Heads" (additional vocals by Tony Hilfiger)		4:01
13.	"Wrist Elbow" (additional vocals by Height, Bow N' Arrow, and Craig Wedren)		3:17
14.	"And Handcuffed" (additional vocals by Craig Wedren)		6:48
