= Oops, I Did It Again! (Cex album) =

Oops, I Did it Again!

Studio album by Cex
- Released: October 12, 2001
- Genre: IDM
- Length: 55:29
- Label: Tigerbeat6

Cex chronology
Role Model (2000)	Oops, I Did it Again! (2001)	Tall, Dark & Handcuffed (2002)

Oops, I Did it Again! is the third full-length release by Rjyan Kidwell under his alias of Cex. The album was released in 2001 by Tigerbeat6 Records.

== Style ==
Pitchfork Media described the music on Oops, I Did It Again! as Kidwell "trying to incorporate a pretty wide spectrum of influences with the fun IDM that's been the bread and butter of his career this far". Despite the humorous album and song titles, the music was a "series of unaffected breakbeats" and "lazy-night melodies" that were similar to intelligent dance music (IDM) albums of the early 1990s. Exclaim! also noted the humorous tone of the album from the inner sleeve art showing Cex murdering a young girl with a steak knife and the comedy sketches that interrupt a few of the tracks.

== Release ==
Oops, I Did it Again! was released by the Tigerbeat6 label on October 12, 2001. It was later released in 2002 by the label Rock Action Records.

== Critical reception ==
Professional ratings
Review scores
Source	Rating
AllMusic	4/5 stars
Pitchfork	6.6/10

The A.V. Club opined, "In spite of its loaded name, Oops goes a long way in presenting Cex as a serious artist—or at least a semi-serious one whose comical digressions add up to more than just nihilistic fancy. Beneath song titles like "Florida (Is Shaped Like A Big Droopy Dick For A Reason)" lay uncommonly emotive glitchscapes that mix up the brooding iciness of Autechre with the giddy brashness of Aphex Twin."

Pitchfork referred to the album as "relatively standard IDM fare" and not "particularly riveting". The review noted that the beats on the album were "top notch" but that "Far too much of this record is simply boring. It's a testament to Cex's inherent talent that the most uninteresting and typical aspects of Oops, I Did It Again are also the ones that seem the most forced."

== Track listing ==
Track listing adapted from Oops, I Did It Again! back cover.

1. "(You're) Off the Food Chain" – 2:04
2. "Eleven Million Dollars Worth of Bearer Bonds" – 4:44
3. "Destination: Sexy" – 7:03
4. "First for Wounds" – 4:51
5. "I Said It Knowing Full Well I Had No Intention of Doing It" – 3:46
6. "Texas Menstruates" – 3:38
7. "It's All About Guilt" – 3:30
8. "Flex on Cex, Eh" – 3:11
9. "I Don't Think You Do Sin, Julia" – 4:09
10. "Florida (Is Shaped Like a Big Droopy Dick for a Reason)" – 5:41
11. "OD'd on First Base" – 3:06
12. "Keep Pretending" – 5:43
13. "Not Trying" – 3:13
14. "After #4 Matrix Sndtrk. Rob D 'Clubbed to Death'" – 0:50

== Personnel ==
Credits adapted from Oops, I Did It Again! booklet.

- Rjyan – songs, pictures
- Richie – pictures
- Lucianne – pictures
- Common Space – art
