= Conrad Leonard =

British composer and pianist

- Born: George Conrad Leonard; 10 October 1898; South Norwood, England, United Kingdom
- Died: 19 April 2003 (aged 104)
- Occupations: Composer, musician
- Instrument: Piano

George Conrad Leonard (10 October 1898 – 19 April 2003) was a British composer and pianist. He was born in South Norwood.

Leonard served in the Middlesex Regiment during the First World War; he left the army in 1919 with the rank of second lieutenant. Leonard then studied music at the Guildhall School of Music, and he subsequently toured the country as a professional musician. From the 1930s, he performed with stars such as Fred Astaire, Cole Porter and Gracie Fields. He composed over 400 ballads; the most famous being "My Love is Only For You" (1946) and "I Heard a Robin Singing" (1948).

During the Second World War, Leonard joined Laurence Wright, a music publishing firm, as an arranger – a position he held until 1969.

He continued to be an active musician into his old age. When he was 99 years old, his doctor advised him to "ease up a bit", and he accordingly cut his engagements to 75 per year. At age 102, he limited his engagements to 25 per year. Until the age of 103 years, he played the piano every Thursday at lunchtime in the Plantation Cafe at Squire's Garden Centre in Twickenham.

In 1999, Leonard was given the Golden Badge Awards by the British Academy of Composers and Songwriters.
