= Cex (musician) =

American musical project

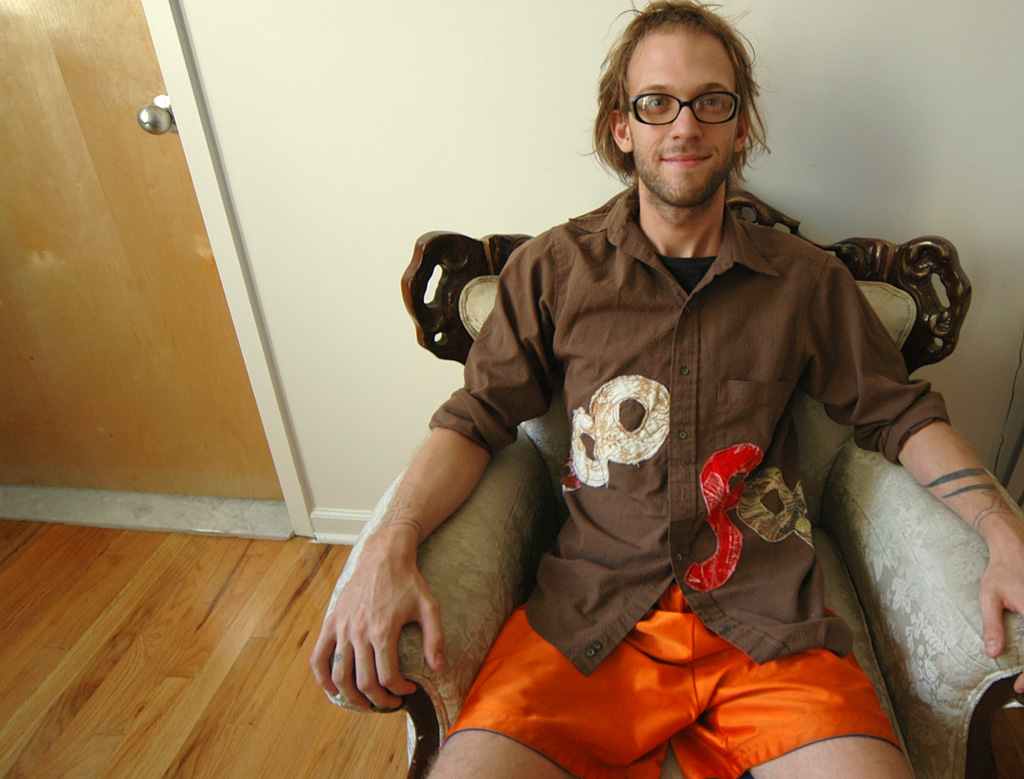

Background information
- Born: Rjyan Claybrook Kidwell; 1981 or 1982 (age 43–44)
- Occupations: Musician, composer, remixer, DJ
- Years active: 1998–present
- Labels: Tigerbeat6, Automation Records, Jade Tree

Cex is an American musical project run by Rjyan Claybrook Kidwell and started in 1998 at the age of 16. Although Cex and Kidwell are frequently used interchangeably, Cex occasionally expands to several people at sporadic points, such as particular tours or albums. In the past it has included Kidwell's musical associates, friends, touring partners, or high school bandmates.

== History ==
The first Cex album, Cells, was released in 1998 by Kidwell's own CD-R label, _underscore, while he was still at Dulaney High School in Timonium, Maryland. The following year, Kidwell and Miguel Depedro (Kid 606) founded Tigerbeat6, which became "one of bedroom electronic music's most prominent independent labels". The next Cex album, Role Model, was one of the label's first releases (2000), and was quickly followed up the next year with Oops, I Did It Again!.

Early Cex releases were classified as IDM (Intelligent dance music) and featured few vocals or lyrics. With Cex’s fifth album, Tall, Dark & Handcuffed(2002), Kidwell began rapping in a style characterized as confrontational, nearly atonal, and braggadocious. To complete the character, Kidwell was known to chat with audience members between or in the middle of songs, and sometimes strip down to his underwear (or less).

In 2002, he was offered an opening slot for the East Coast leg of the Death and Dismemberment tour with Death Cab for Cutie and old friends from Washington, DC The Dismemberment Plan. He has continued to open for noted bands such as Super Furry Animals, The Postal Service and The Roots, as well as musical friends Grand Buffet.

2006's Actual Fucking is made up of tracks named after and written about various American cities (Baltimore, Los Angeles, Denton, etc.). The album is heavy on vocals and was released by Seattle label Automation Records.

From 2006 to 2008, Kidwell released music by the name of Sand Cats in collaboration with Roby Newton of Milemarker (band). The project was described as a “solo group for two people". They moved back to Baltimore in 2005.

Kidwell predominantly spent 2013 working in theater productions and DJing at clubs in Baltimore. He performed new music as Cex in 2014 that was described as a "dramatic change in direction".

== Experimental Theatre ==
In 2012, Kidwell performed in a theatrical adaptation of Philip K. Dick’s Ubik at the Baltimore Annex Theater. Since then, he has appeared regularly in Annex productions as a performer, sound designer, and writer.

== Discography ==
=== Albums ===
- Cells (1998 · Underscore Records)
- Role Model (2000 · Tigerbeat6)
- Oops, I Did It Again! (2001 · Tigerbeat6)
- Tall, Dark, & Handcuffed (2002 · Tigerbeat6)
- Being Ridden (2003 · Temporary Residence)
- BR Instrumentals (2003 · Temporary Residence)
- Maryland Mansions (2003 · Jade Tree Records)
- Actual Fucking (2006 · Automation Records)
- Sketchi (2007 · Temporary Residence)
- Dannibal (2007 · Must Finish/Wildfirewildfire Records)
- Bataille Royale (2009 · Must Finish/Tigerbeat6)
- Konx Om Cex, Vol. 1 (2010 • Must Finish)
- Tiny Creature (2011 · Tigerbeat6)
- Presumed Dead (2012 · Automation Records)
- Masokismi (2012 · Wtr Clr)
- Prosperity as Rjyan Kidwell (2013 · Nibbana/Tigerbeat6)
- Shamaneater (2014 · Automation Records)

=== EPs/Singles/Splits ===
- Shift-Minus Vol. 1 (1999 · Underscore Records)
- Get Your Badass On EP (2000 · 555 Recordings)
- Role Playa (2000 · Tigerbeat6/555 Recordings)
- Starship Galactica (2001 · 555 Recordings)
- Oops, I Did It Again! EP (2001 · Tigerbeat6)
- $ Vol. 2 (2001 · Tigerbeat6)
- The "Connected" Series#2 (2001 · Klangkrieg)
- Bad Acne EP (2002 · Tigerbeat6)
- Shotgun Wedding Vol. 3: Oh, So Now You Fuckers Wanna Dance? (2004 · Violent Turd)
- Know Doubt (2005 · Record Label)
- Miami Mansions (2006 · Must Finish)
- Exotical Privates (2007 · Automation Records)
- Baltimore Ends with an E split cassette with Mark Brown (2009 • Holy Holy Holy Records)
- Nonconsenshredemption (2010 • Wtr Clr)
- Evargreaz (2010 · Automation Records)
- Megamuse EP (2011 · Tigerbeat6)
- Secret Monog EP (2011 · Tigerbeat6)
- Title King split cassette with Jason Urick (2011 · Wtr Clr)
- Cobweb & Colossus EP (2012 · Tigerbeat6)
