= Being Ridden =

Studio album by Cex
- Released: 2003
- Recorded: November 2001 – September 2002
- Genre: Electronic, hip-hop
- Length: 40:20
- Label: Temporary Residence TRR55

Cex chronology
Tall, Dark & Handcuffed (2002)	Being Ridden (2003)	Maryland Mansions (2003)

Professional ratings
Review scores
Source	Rating
AllMusic	3.5/5 stars
Alternative Press	Jul 2003, p.124
Pitchfork Media	7.1/10
Playlouder	link
Rolling Stone	3.5/5 stars
Stylus Magazine	68% link
URB	#234, p.53
The Wire	#234, p.53

Being Ridden is an album by the American musician Cex, released in 2003. It is his second album to move away from straight ahead electronic music sounds and indulge in more hip-hop based music, complete with rapping by Cex. The album cover is an homage to David Bowie's album cover for his album "Heroes".

== Track listing ==
1. "The Wayback Machine" (Kidwell) – 3:36
2. "You Kiss Like You're Dead" (Kidwell) – 2:19
3. "Not Working" (Kidwell) – 4:22
4. "Signal Katied" (Kidwell) – 1:49
5. "Earth-Shaking Event" (Kidwell) – 3:20
6. "Cex at Arm's Length" (Kidwell) – 2:37
7. "Stamina" (Kidwell, Venetian Snares) – 2:33
8. "See Ya Never, Sike" (Kidwell) – 2:25
9. "The Marriage" (Kidwell) – 3:11
10. "Other Countries" (Kidwell) – 3:20
11. "Brer Rjyan" (Kidwell) – 3:31
12. "Dead Bodies" (Kidwell) – 5:21
13. "Never Mind" (Kidwell) – 1:55
