= Patricia Kaas discography =

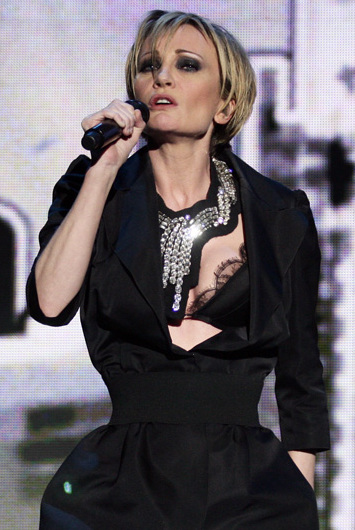
- Patricia Kaas in Vilnius, 2009
- Studio albums: 10
- Live albums: 7
- Compilation albums: 4
- Singles: 53

French singer Patricia Kaas has released ten studio albums, seven live albums, four compilation albums, and fifty-three singles. Kaas' first hit, "Mademoiselle chante le blues" was released in November 1987. It peaked at number seven on the French Singles Chart in January 1988 and was certified Silver. The next single, "D'Allemagne" was issued in May 1988 and reached number eleven in July 1988. Both songs were included on Kaas' debut album, Mademoiselle chante... released in November 1988. The album peaked at number two in France in February 1989 and stayed on the chart until 1991. Mademoiselle chante... was certified Diamond in France and has sold 1.6 million copies in this country alone. It was also certified 2× Platinum in Switzerland and Gold in Canada. The album also peaked at number thirteen on the European Top 100 Albums chart. The third single, "Mon mec à moi" was issued in November 1988 and reached number five in France in February 1989. It was also certified Silver. Released as the next single in May 1989, "Elle voulait jouer cabaret" peaked at number seventeen in France in June 1989. The last single, "Quand Jimmy dit" was issued in October 1989. It reached number ten in France the next month and was also certified Silver.

The second album, Scène de vie was released on 9 April 1990. It topped the chart in France for ten consecutive weeks and was certified Diamond after selling over 1.3 million copies there. Scène de vie also reached number fifteen in Switzerland, number eighteen in Germany and number twenty on the European Top 100 Albums. It was also certified 2× Platinum in Switzerland, Platinum in Canada and Gold in Germany. The album also entered the Billboard's World Albums chart, and peaked at number seven there. Scène de vie included four top forty singles: "Les hommes qui passent" (number seven), "Les mannequins d'osier" (number twenty-one), "Kennedy Rose" (number thirty-six) and "Regarde les riches" (number twenty-seven). It was followed by a live album, Carnets de scène which was issued in November 1991. Carnets de scène peaked at number eight in France and was certified 2× Gold.

The third studio album, Je te dis vous was released on 6 April 1993. It became Kaas' second number-one album in France. Je te dis vous debuted at the top of the chart and stayed there for five consecutive weeks. It has sold over 1.4 million copies in France and became Kaas' third Diamond album there. Je te dis vous also peaked at number two in Switzerland, number ten on the European Top 100 Albums and number eleven in Germany, and was certified 2× Platinum in Switzerland, Platinum in Finland, and Gold in Canada and Germany. Various singles were released to promote the album, including the most successful "Il me dit que je suis belle" (number five in France; Silver certification), and also "Entrer dans la lumière" (number fifteen in France), "Ceux qui n'ont rien" and "Reste sur moi" (number twenty-six on the US Dance Club Songs). The second live album, Tour de charme was issued in November 1994, reaching number fourteen in France nad being certified Platinum.

Dans ma chair, the next studio album was released on 18 March 1997. It topped the chart in Belgium Wallonia and reached number two in France, number five in Switzerland, number eight in Finland, number eleven on the European Top 100 Albums and number sixteen in Germany. It was certified 2× Platinum in France, Platinum in Belgium and Switzerland, and Gold in Finland. It was also awarded with Platinum certification by the IFPI for selling over one million copies in Europe. The most successful songs from the album included the lead single, "Quand j'ai peur de tout" (number eleven in France; Silver certification) and the second single, "Je voudrais la connaître" (number nine in Belgium Wallonia nad number twenty in France). Another live album, Rendez-vous was issued in August 1998. It reached top ten in France and Belgium Wallonia, and was certified 2× Gold in France.

The fifth studio album, Le mot de passe was released on 14 May 1999. It peaked at number two in France and Belgium Wallonia, and reached top forty in other countries. Le mot de passe was certified Platinum in France, and Gold in Belgium and Switzerland. The lead single, "Ma liberté contre la tienne" reached top forty in France and Belgium Wallonia. The fourth live album, titled simply Live was issued in August 2000 and peaked at number five in France where it was certified 2× Gold. Rien ne s'arrête, Kaas' first greatest hits album from October 2001 peaked at number two in France, number three in Belgium Wallonia and number fourteen in Switzerland. It was also certified Platinum in France and Gold in Belgium and Switzerland.

Inspired by the film And Now... Ladies and Gentlemen, in which Kaas starred alongside Jeremy Irons, she has recorded her sixth studio album, Piano Bar. Released on 15 April 2002, Piano Bar reached top ten in the European Francophone countries, and top forty elsewhere, including New Zealand. It was certified Gold in France and Switzerland. Sexe fort, the seventh studio album was issued on 1 December 2003. It peaked inside top ten in the Francophone countries in Europe, and achieved 2× Gold certification in France and Gold certification in Switzerland. The following live album from January 2005, Toute la musique... reached top ten in France.

The next studio albums included: Kabaret (2008) and Kaas chante Piaf (2012), followed by two live albums: Kabaret: Live au Casino de Paris (2009) and Kaas chante Piaf à l'Olympia (2014), and two compilations: 19 par Patricia Kaas (2009) (released in Europe) and Mademoiselle n'a pas chanté que le blues (2011) (issued in Canada). Kabaret reached top ten in Switzerland, Belgium Wallonia, Finland and Greece, and Kaas chante Piaf peaked inside top ten in France and Switzerland.

== Albums ==
=== Studio albums ===
Title	Album details	Peak chart positions											Sales	Certifications
Title	Album details	FRA	AUT	BEL F	BEL W	EU	FIN	GER	NLD	NZL	POL	SWI	Sales	Certifications
Mademoiselle chante...	Released: November 1988; Label: Polydor; Formats: CD, LP, cassette	2	—	n/a	n/a	13	n/a	—	—	—	n/a	—		FRA: Diamond; CAN: Gold; SWI: 2× Platinum
Scène de vie	Released: 9 April 1990; Label: CBS; Formats: CD, LP, cassette	1	—	n/a	n/a	20	n/a	18	—	—	n/a	15		FRA: Diamond; CAN: Platinum; GER: Gold; SWI: 2× Platinum
Je te dis vous (Note: Je te dis vous also peaked at number seven on the Billboard's World Albums.)	Released: 6 April 1993; Label: Columbia; Formats: CD, LP, cassette	1	—	1		10	n/a	11	83	—	n/a	2		FRA: Diamond; CAN: Gold; FIN: Platinum; GER: Gold; SWI: 2× Platinum
Dans ma chair	Released: 18 March 1997; Label: Columbia; Formats: CD, cassette	2	45	27	1	11	8	16	77	—	n/a	5		FRA: 2× Platinum; BEL: Platinum; EU: Platinum; FIN: Gold; SWI: Platinum
Le mot de passe	Released: 14 May 1999; Label: Columbia; Formats: CD, cassette	2	—	—	2	15	26	27	—	—	n/a	14		FRA: Platinum; BEL: Gold; SWI: Gold
Piano Bar (Note: Piano Bar is a concept album inspired by the film And Now... Ladies and Gentlemen, in which Kaas starred alongside Jeremy Irons. It is a tribute to the modern chanson, sung mainly in English.)	Released: 15 April 2002; Label: Columbia; Formats: CD, cassette	10	38	—	6	23	—	12	—	35	—	6		FRA: Gold; SWI: Gold
Sexe fort	Released: 1 December 2003; Label: Columbia; Formats: CD, cassette	9	—	99	3	41	31	55	—	—	—	6		FRA: 2× Gold; SWI: Gold
Kabaret (Note: Kabaret is a concept album, a tribute to the 1930s.)	Released: 15 December 2008; Label: Sony Music; Formats: CD, digital	15	—	38	4	n/a	7	32	—	—	19	3	World: 800,000	FRA: Gold; RUS: Diamond
Kaas chante Piaf (Note: Kaas chante Piaf is a concept album, a tribute to Édith Piaf.)	Released: 5 November 2012; Label: EMI; Formats: CD, digital	6	67	45	11	—	17	28	89	—	22	8	World: 250,000	FRA: Platinum
Patricia Kaas	Released: 11 November 2016; Label: Warner; Formats: CD, digital	12	—	69	9	—	—	34	—	—	—	10		FRA: Gold
"—" denotes a recording that did not chart or was not released in that territory.

=== Live albums ===
Title	Album details	Peak chart positions						Certifications
Title	Album details	FRA	BEL W	EU	GER	NLD	SWI	Certifications
Carnets de scène	Released: November 1991; Label: Columbia; Formats: CD, LP, cassette	8	n/a	39	53	100	40	FRA: 2× Gold
Tour de charme	Released: 25 November 1994; Label: Columbia; Formats: CD, cassette	14	n/a	49	65	—	42	FRA: Platinum
Rendez-vous	Released: 18 August 1998; Label: Columbia; Formats: CD, cassette	6	5	48	—	—	29	FRA: 2× Gold
Live	Released: 28 August 2000; Label: Columbia; Formats: CD, cassette	5	11	33	—	—	18	FRA: 2× Gold
Toute la musique...	Released: 31 January 2005; Label: Columbia; Formats: CD, CD/DVD	10	15	83	34	—	40	
Kabaret: Live au Casino de Paris	Released: 25 September 2009; Label: Sony Music; Formats: DVD, DVD/CD	— (Note: Kabaret: Live au Casino de Paris was released in France on DVD only and peaked on the DVD Chart at number two.)	—	—	—	—	—	
Kaas chante Piaf à l'Olympia	Released: 28 March 2014; Label: Parlophone; Formats: CD/DVD	73	83	—	—	—	—	
"—" denotes a recording that did not chart or was not released in that territory.

=== Compilation albums ===
Title	Album details	Peak chart positions						Certifications
Title	Album details	FRA	BEL W	EU	FIN	GER	SWI	Certifications
Rien ne s'arrête	Released: 22 October 2001; Label: Columbia; Formats: CD, cassette	2	3	69	38	39	14	FRA: Platinum; BEL: Gold; SWI: Gold
19 par Patricia Kaas	Released: 16 November 2009; Label: EMI; Formats: CD, digital	27	42	—	—	—	—	
Mademoiselle n'a pas chanté que le blues (Note: Mademoiselle n'a pas chante que le blues was released in Canada only.)	Released: 3 October 2011; Label: Artic; Formats: CD, digital	—	—	—	—	—	—	
1987–2025: Une vie	Released: 25 April 2025; Label: Warner; Formats: CD, digital	66	14	—	—	—	—	
"—" denotes a recording that did not chart or was not released in that territory.

=== Other albums ===
Title	Album details	Peak chart positions	
Title	Album details	GER	SWI
Café noir (Note: Café noir is an English-language album released on promotional CDs only.)	Released: 2 April 1996; Label: Columbia; Formats: Promotional CD	—	—
Christmas in Vienna VI (Note: Christmas in Vienna VI is a live album by Plácido Domingo, Patricia Kaas and Alejandro Fernández. Christmas in Vienna VI, retitled Christmastime in Vienna also reached number 10 on Billboard's Top Classical Crossover Albums Chart and number 19 on Top Classical Albums Chart.)	Released: 21 September 1999; Label: Sony Classical; Formats: CD, cassette	49	97
"—" denotes a recording that did not chart or was not released in that territory.

== Singles ==
Year	Title	Peak chart positions							Certifications	Album
Year	Title	FRA	BEL F	BEL W	EU	GER	SWI	US Club	Certifications	Album
1985	"Jalouse"	—	—	—	—	—	—	—		—N/a
1987	"Mademoiselle chante le blues"	7	34	—	24	—	—	—	FRA: Silver	Mademoiselle chante...
1988	"D'Allemagne"	11	—	—	39	—	—	—		Mademoiselle chante...
1988	"Mon mec à moi"	5	—	—	26	—	—	—	FRA: Silver	Mademoiselle chante...
1989	"Elle voulait jouer cabaret"	17	—	—	65	—	—	—		Mademoiselle chante...
1989	"Quand Jimmy dit"	10	—	—	42	—	—	—	FRA: Silver	Mademoiselle chante...
1990	"Les hommes qui passent"	7	—	—	35	—	—	—		Scène de vie
1990	"Les mannequins d'osier"	21	—	—	88	—	—	—		Scène de vie
1991	"Kennedy Rose"	36	—	—	—	—	—	—		Scène de vie
1991	"Regarde les riches"	27	—	—	—	—	—	—		Scène de vie
1991	"Une dernière semaine à New-York"	— (Note: "Une dernière semaine à New-York" did not chart inside of Top 50 French Singles Chart but reached number 72 on the French Airplay Chart.)	—	—	—	—	—	—		Carnets de scène
1991	"Bessie"	—	—	—	—	—	—			Carnets de scène
1991	"Vénus des abribus"	—	—	—	—	—	—	—		Carnets de scène
1992	"Les mannequins d'osier" (live)	—	—	—	—	—	—	—		Carnets de scène
1993	"A Saint-Lunaire"	—	—	—	—	—	—	—		—N/a
1993	"Entrer dans la lumière"	15	—	—	77	—	—	—		Je te dis vous
1993	"Ceux qui n'ont rien"	— (Note: "Ceux qui n'ont rien" did not chart inside of Top 50 French Singles Chart but reached number 30 on the French Airplay Chart.)	—	—	—	83	—	—		Je te dis vous
1993	"Il me dit que je suis belle"	5	—	—	86	80	—	—	FRA: Silver	Je te dis vous
1993	"Hôtel Normandy"	—	—	—	—	—	—	—		Je te dis vous
1993	"Ganz und gar"	—	—	—	—	67	—	—		Je te dis vous
1994	"Fatiguée d'attendre"	—	—	—	—	—	—	—		Je te dis vous
1994	"Reste sur moi"	—	—	—	—	—	—	26		Je te dis vous
1994	"A qui d'autre que vous"	—	—	—	—	—	—	—		—N/a
1994	"Mademoiselle chante le blues" (live)	— (Note: "Mademoiselle chante le blues" (live) did not chart inside of Top 50 French Singles Chart but reached number 28 on the French Airplay Chart.)	—	—	—	—	—	—		Tour de charme
1995	"Hôtel Normandy" (live)	—	—	—	—	—	—	—		Tour de charme
1995	"La chanson des misérables"	—	—	—	—	—	—	—		Les Misérables Soundtrack
1997	"Quand j'ai peur de tout"	11	—	12	37	—	41	—	FRA: Silver	Dans ma chair
1997	"Je voudrais la connaître"	20	—	9	62	—	—	—		Dans ma chair
1997	"Les lignes de nos mains"	— (Note: "Les lignes de nos mains" did not chart inside of Top 50 French Singles Chart but reached number 25 on the French Airplay Chart.)	—	—	—	—	—	—		Dans ma chair
1998	"Je me souviens de rien"	— (Note: "Je me souviens de rien" did not chart inside of Top 100 French Singles Chart but reached number 21 on the French Airplay Chart.)	—	—	—	—	—	—		Dans ma chair
1998	"L'aigle noir"	— (Note: "L'aigle noir" did not chart inside of Top 100 French Singles Chart but reached number 29 on the French Airplay Chart.)	—	28	—	—	—	—		Rendez-vous
1999	"Ma liberté contre la tienne"	34	—	26	—	—	—	—		Le mot de passe
1999	"Une femme comme une autre"	78	—	—	—	—	—	—		Le mot de passe
1999	"Une fille de l'Est"	— (Note: "Une fille de l'Est" was released as a promotional single in France and reached number 30 on the French Airplay Chart.)	—	—	—	—	—	—		Le mot de passe
1999	"Si tu rêves"	—	—	—	—	—	—	—		Le mot de passe
1999	"Unter der Haut" (Duet with Erkan Aki)	—	—	—	—	61	—	—		Le mot de passe
2000	"Le mot de passe"	— (Note: "Le mot de passe" was released as a promotional single in France and reached number 32 on the French Airplay Chart.)	—	—	—	—	—	—		Le mot de passe
2000	"Mon chercheur d'or"	74	—	—	—	—	—	—		Le mot de passe
2000	"Les chansons commencent"	70	—	—	—	—	—	—		Live
2001	"Rien ne s'arrête"	— (Note: "Rien ne s'arrête" was released as a promotional single in France and reached number 36 on the French Airplay Chart.)	—	—	—	—	—	—		Rien ne s'arrête
2002	"If You Go Away"	83	—	—	—	—	—	—		Piano Bar
2002	"And Now... Ladies and Gentlemen"	—	—	—	—	—	—	—		Piano Bar
2003	"Où sont les hommes?"	— (Note: "Où sont les hommes" was released as a promotional single in France and reached number 15 on the French Airplay Chart.)	—	—	—	—	—	—		Sexe fort
2004	"Je le garde pour toi"	— (Note: "Je le garde pour toi" was released as a promotional single in France and reached number 29 on the French Airplay Chart.)	—	—	—	—	—	—		Sexe fort
2004	"Je t'aime, je ne t'aime plus"	—	—	—	—	—	—	—		Sexe fort
2004	"C'est la faute à la vie"	—	—	—	—	—	—	—		Sexe fort
2005	"Toute la musique que j'aime"	59	—	—	—	—	—	—		Toute la musique...
2005	"Herz Eines Kämpfers"	—	—	—	—	—	—	—		Toute la musique...
2008	"Ne Pozvonish" (Uma2rman with Patricia Kaas) (Note: "Ne Pozvonish" was released as a promotional single in Russia.)	—	—	—	—	—	—	—		Kuda Privodyat Mechty
2009	"Kabaret"	—	—	— (Note: "Kabaret" did not enter the Ultratop 50 Singles Chart in Belgium Wallonia, but peaked at number 13 on the Ultratip Chart.)	—	—	—	—		Kabaret
2009	"Et s'il fallait le faire"	41	— (Note: "Et s'il fallait le faire" did not enter the Ultratop 50 Singles Chart in Belgium Flanders, but peaked at number 21 on the Ultratip Chart.)	— (Note: "Et s'il fallait le faire" did not enter the Ultratop 50 Singles Chart in Belgium Wallonia, but peaked at number 18 on the Ultratip Chart.)	—	—	—	—		Kabaret
2011	"Tout confort" (Robin Millar with Patricia Kaas) (Note: "Tout confort" is a song taken from Robin Millar's 2003 album, Kiss and Tell. It was released as a digital single in 2011.)	—	—	—	—	—	—	—		Kiss and Tell
2012	"Hymne à l'amour"	—	—	— (Note: "Hymne à l'amour" did not enter the Ultratop 50 Singles Chart in Belgium Wallonia, but peaked at number 29 on the Ultratip Chart.)	—	—	—	—		Kaas chante Piaf
2013	"Avec ce soleil"	—	—	—	—	—	—	—		Kaas chante Piaf
2016	"Le jour et l'heure"	69	—	—	—	—	—	—		Patricia Kaas
2016	"Madame tout le monde"	—	—	—	—	—	—	—		Patricia Kaas
"—" denotes a title that did not chart, or was not released in that territory

== Home videos ==
Title	Video details	Peak chart positions	Certifications
Title	Video details	FRA	Certifications
Les clips	Released: 16 October 1989; Label: PolyGram Music Video; Formats: VHS	n/a	
Carnets de scène	Released: November 1991; Label: Sony Music Video; Formats: VHS, DVD (2004)	n/a	
Tour de charme	Released: 25 November 1994; Label: Sony Music Video; Formats: VHS, DVD (2004)	n/a	FRA: Gold
Rendez-vous	Released: 18 August 1998; Label: Sony Music Video; Formats: VHS, DVD (2000)	9	FRA: Gold
Ce sera nous	Released: 28 August 2000; Label: Sony Music Video; Formats: VHS, DVD	9	FRA: Platinum
Toute la musique...	Released: 31 January 2005; Label: Columbia; Formats: DVD, DVD/CD	18	
Kabaret: Live au Casino de Paris	Released: 18 May 2009; Label: Universal; Formats: DVD, DVD/CD	2	
Kaas chante Piaf à l'Olympia	Released: 28 March 2014; Label: Parlophone; Formats: DVD/CD	— (Note: Kaas chante Piaf à l'Olympia charted on the French Albums Chart and peaked at number 73.)	
"—" denotes a recording that did not chart or was not released in that territory.
