= Mademoiselle n'a pas chanté que le blues =

Compilation album by Patricia Kaas
- Released: 3 October 2011
- Genre: Chanson; pop

Patricia Kaas chronology
19 par Patricia Kaas (2009)	Mademoiselle n'a pas chanté que le blues (2011)	Kaas chante Piaf (2012)

Mademoiselle n'a pas chanté que le blues is the 2011 compilation album by French singer Patricia Kaas, released in Canada on 3 October 2011.

== Track listing ==
No.	Title	Album	Length
1.	"Une fille de l'Est"	Le mot de passe	3:28
2.	"C'est la faute à la vie"	Sexe fort	3:56
3.	"Summertime"	Carnets de scène	2:12
4.	"Mon mec à moi"	Mademoiselle chante...	4:16
5.	"Mne Nravitsya"	Kabaret (Russian edition)	3:17
6.	"Il me dit que je suis belle"	Je te dis vous	4:42
7.	"Peut-être que peut-être"	Sexe fort	3:48
8.	"Entrer dans la lumière"	Je te dis vous	4:02
9.	"If You Go Away"	Piano Bar	4:08
10.	"Et s'il fallait le faire" (Eurovision version)	Kabaret	3:00
11.	"D'Allemagne"	Mademoiselle chante...	3:55
12.	"Où sont les hommes"	Sexe fort	3:48
13.	"Si tu rêves"	Le mot de passe	3:50
14.	"Je voudrais la connaître"	Dans ma chair	4:18
15.	"Mademoiselle chante le blues" (Long version)	Mademoiselle chante... / Carnets de scène	7:40
16.	"Lili Marlène"	Carnets de scène	0:53
17.	"Das Glück Kennt nur Minuten" (Digital deluxe edition)	Kabaret (German edition)	3:38
18.	"Wo Sind die Clowns" (Digital deluxe edition)	Kabaret (German edition)	3:31
