= 19 par Patricia Kaas =

Compilation album by Patricia Kaas
- Released: 16 November 2009
- Genre: Chanson; pop

Patricia Kaas chronology
Kabaret: Live au Casino de Paris (2009)	19 par Patricia Kaas (2009)	Mademoiselle n'a pas chanté que le blues (2011)

19 par Patricia Kaas is the 2009 compilation album by French singer Patricia Kaas.

== Track listing ==
French edition
No.	Title	Album	Length
1.	"Mademoiselle chante le blues" (Live)	Mademoiselle chante... / Kabaret Live	3:35
2.	"D'Allemagne" (Live)	Mademoiselle chante... / Kabaret Live	4:12
3.	"Mon mec à moi" (Live)	Mademoiselle chante... / Kabaret Live	4:25
4.	"Les hommes qui passent"	Scène de vie	3:46
5.	"Une dernière semaine à New York"	Scène de vie	3:00
6.	"Entrer dans la lumière"	Je te dis vous	4:05
7.	"Il me dit que je suis belle" (Single version)	Je te dis vous	4:43
8.	"Quand j'ai peur de tout"	Dans ma chair	4:20
9.	"Je voudrais la connaitre"	Dans ma chair	4:18
10.	"Ma liberté contre la tienne"	Le mot de passe	5:03
11.	"Une fille de l'Est"	Le mot de passe	3:30
12.	"If You Go Away"	Piano Bar	4:28
13.	"Où sont les hommes"	Sexe fort	3:49
14.	"Je le garde pour toi"	Sexe fort	3:21
15.	"Et s'il fallait le faire" (Eurovision version)	Kabaret	3:02
16.	"Kabaret"	Kabaret	4:01
17.	"Une dernière fois"	Kabaret	4:33
18.	"Mne Nravitsya"	Kabaret (Russian edition)	3:20
19.	"Addicte aux héroïnes"	Kabaret	2:17

German edition
No.	Title	Album	Length
1.	"Mademoiselle chante le blues" (Live)	Mademoiselle chante... / Kabaret Live	3:35
2.	"D'Allemagne" (Live)	Mademoiselle chante... / Kabaret Live	4:12
3.	"Mon mec à moi" (Live)	Mademoiselle chante... / Kabaret Live	4:25
4.	"Les hommes qui passent"	Scène de vie	3:46
5.	"Une dernière semaine à New York"	Scène de vie	3:00
6.	"Entrer dans la lumière"	Je te dis vous	4:05
7.	"Il me dit que je suis belle" (Single version)	Je te dis vous	4:43
8.	"Quand j'ai peur de tout"	Dans ma chair	4:20
9.	"Je voudrais la connaitre"	Dans ma chair	4:18
10.	"Ma liberté contre la tienne"	Le mot de passe	5:03
11.	"Une fille de l'Est"	Le mot de passe	3:30
12.	"Unter der Haut" (Duet with Erkan Aki)	Le mot de passe	3:42
13.	"If You Go Away"	Piano Bar	4:28
14.	"Où sont les hommes"	Sexe fort	3:49
15.	"Je le garde pour toi"	Sexe fort	3:21
16.	"Herz Eines Kämpfers" (Pop version)	Toute la musique...	4:02
17.	"Et s'il fallait le faire" (Eurovision version)	Kabaret	3:02
18.	"Kabaret"	Kabaret	4:01
19.	"Une dernière fois"	Kabaret	4:33

== Charts ==
Chart (2009)	Peak position
Belgian Albums (Ultratop Wallonia)	42
French Compilations (SNEP)	27
Greek Albums (IFPI)	7
