= Kabaret: Live au Casino de Paris =

Video by Patricia Kaas
- Released: 18 May 2009
- Genre: Chanson; cabaret
- Label: Sony Music

Patricia Kaas chronology
Kabaret (2008)	Kabaret: Live au Casino de Paris (2009)	19 par Patricia Kaas (2009)

Alternative cover
- CD/DVD edition

Kabaret: Live au Casino de Paris is a home video/live album by French singer Patricia Kaas. It was released on DVD in France on 18 May 2009. Later, on 25 September 2009 it was issued as a two-disc CD/DVD set in Germany. The video/album was recorded in January 2009 during the concerts at the Casino de Paris, which promoted Kabaret (2008). Kabaret: Live au Casino de Paris includes songs from Kabaret, and also Kaas previous hits. The DVD debuted and peaked at number two on the French DVD Chart, only behind Celine Dion's Live à Quebec.

== Track listing ==
DVD
No.	Title	Length
1.	"K-Thème"	3:09
2.	"Mon mec à moi"	4:07
3.	"Faites entrer les clowns"	4:27
4.	"Le jour se lève"	4:55
5.	"Kabaret"	4:40
6.	"Les hommes qui passent"	5:40
7.	"Pigalle" (Interlude)	5:32
8.	"Falling in Love Again"	3:55
9.	"D'Allemagne"	5:37
10.	"Une dernière fois"	6:17
11.	"Une fille de l'Est"	4:53
12.	"Je voudrais la connaître"	6:14
13.	"Solo"	1:44
14.	"La chance jamais ne dure"	7:50
15.	"Il me dit que je suis belle"	5:56
16.	"Elle voulait jouer cabaret"	7:46
17.	"Mademoiselle chante le blues"	9:12
18.	"K-Interlude"	2:49
19.	"Entrer dans la lumière"	6:09
20.	"Et s'il fallait le faire"	5:45
21.	"Addicte aux héroïnes"	2:41
22.	"Et s'il fallait le faire" (Music video) (bonus)	3:36
23.	"Kabaret" (Music video) (bonus)	3:16

CD (from the German CD/DVD edition)
No.	Title	Writer(s)	Producer(s)	Length
1.	"K-Thème"	Frédéric Helbert	Helbert	2:58
2.	"Mon mec à moi"	Didier Barbelivien; François Bernheim	Helbert	4:23
3.	"Les hommes qui passent"	Barbelivien; Bernheim	Helbert	4:45
4.	"Kabaret"	Artie Kaplan; Arthur Kornfel; Brifo; Dairaine	Helbert	4:11
5.	"Pigalle" (Interlude)	Arnaud de Bosredon; Charles Delaporte; Hugues Payen	Helbert	5:26
6.	"Falling in Love Again"	Friedrich Hollaender; Sammy Lerner	Helbert	3:52
7.	"D'Allemagne"	Barbelivien; Bernheim	Helbert	5:22
8.	"Une fille de l'Est"	Jean-Jacques Goldman	Helbert	4:38
9.	"Solo"	Blair MacKichan; Diane Birch; Stephane Laporte	Helbert	5:29
10.	"La chance jamais ne dure"	Hermann Thieme; Hildegard Knef; Laporte	Helbert	3:42
11.	"Il me dit que je suis belle"	Goldman	Helbert	5:10
12.	"Elle voulait jouer cabaret"	Barbelivien	Helbert	5:07
13.	"Mademoiselle chante le blues"	Barbelivien; Bob Mehdi	Helbert	8:17
14.	"K-Interlude"	Helbert	Helbert	2:50
15.	"Entrer dans la lumière"	Barbelivien; Bernheim	Helbert	4:17
16.	"Et s'il fallait le faire"	Anze Lazio; Fred Blondin	Helbert	5:06

== Charts ==
=== Weekly charts ===
DVD Chart (2009)	Peak position
French Music DVDs (SNEP)	2

=== Year-end charts ===
Chart (2009)	Position
French Music DVDs (SNEP)	58

== Release history ==
Region	Date	Label	Format	Catalog
France	18 May 2009	Sony Music	DVD	6 00753 17944 4
Germany	25 September 2009	Sony Music	CD/DVD	8 8697558282 2
