= Rien ne s'arrête =

Greatest hits album by Patricia Kaas
- Released: October 22, 2001
- Recorded: New York, U.S. London, UK
- Genre: Pop
- Length: 75:14
- Label: Sony BMG, Columbia

Patricia Kaas chronology
Live (2000)	Rien ne s'arrête (2001)	Piano Bar (2002)

Professional ratings
Review scores
Source	Rating
Stereo & Video	5/5 stars

Rien ne s'arrête (Eng: Nothing Stops) is the name of a compilation by the French singer Patricia Kaas. It was released in 2001 and achieved a good success in various countries.

== Background ==
This compilation was the first one released by the singer. It debuted on October 22, 2001 and was published by her record company, Sony BMG. As indicates on the cover with the mention '1987-2001', the album, actually a best of, contains all Kaas' songs released as singles from her first five studio albums (Mademoiselle chante..., Scène de vie, Je te dis vous, Dans ma chair, Le Mot de passe). However, there are several exceptions : the singles "Elle voulait jouer cabaret" and "Regarde les riches" are not available on this compilation, "Mademoiselle chante le blues" and "Les chansons commencent" were recorded in a live version during the 2000 Le Mot de passe tour, there is a live cover of Barbara's song "L'Aigle noir", "Il me dit que je suis belle" is in its single version, and a new song with eponymous title, "Rien ne s'arrête", features as the first track.

== Chart performance ==
The album was generally well received in the charts. It featured for 18 weeks in Belgium (Wallonia), debuting at #6 on November 3, 2001, before climbing to #3, its highest position, the week after. Even if it almost kept on dropping thereafter, it managed to stabilize for 14 weeks in the top 20. It was ranked #36 on the End of the Year Chart.

In Switzerland, the album started at #23 on November 4, 2001, then reached its peak position, #14, before almost dropping every week. It totaled nine weeks in the top 50 and 14 weeks in the top 100. It was certified Gold disc the same year.

In France, the album entered the compilations chart at #2 on October 27, 2001 and stayed there for another week. It dropped slowly on the chart, totaling seven weeks in the top ten. It disappeared from the chart on the edition of March 2, 2002. It achieved Platinum status.

The best of achieved a moderate success in Germany, peaking at #39, and in Finland, where it was charted for a single week at #38.

== Track listings ==
#	Title	Length	Album
1.	"Rien ne s'arrête" (C.Vié / D.Manet)	3:29	—
2.	"D'Allemagne" (D.Barbelivien / F.Bernheim - D.Barbelivien)	4:23	Mademoiselle chante...
3.	"Mon mec à moi" (D.Barbelivien / F.Bernheim)	4:13	Mademoiselle chante...
4.	"Quand Jimmy dit" (D.Barbelivien - F.Bernheim / D.Barbelivien)	3:43	Mademoiselle chante...
5.	"Mademoiselle chante le blues" (live) (D.Barbelivien - B.Medhi / D.Barbelivien)	3:21	Mademoiselle chante... / Ce sera nous
6.	"Les hommes qui passent" (D.Barbelivien / F.Bernheim)	3:46	Scène de vie
7.	"Les Mannequins d'osier" (D.Barbelivien / F.Bernheim)	3:52	Scène de vie
8.	"Kennedy Rose" (E.Depardieu / F.Bernheim - D.Barbelivien)	3:18	Scène de vie
9.	"Entrer dans la lumière" (D.Barbelivien / F.Bernheim)	4:05	Je te dis vous
10.	"Il me dit que je suis belle" (single version) (S.Brewski)	4:45	Je te dis vous
11.	"Ceux qui n'ont rien" (D.Barbelivien - F.Bernheim / D.Barbelivien)	3:53	Je te dis vous
12.	"Quand j'ai peur de tout" (D.Warren - J.J.Goldman / D.Warren)	4:20	Dans ma chair
13.	"Je voudrais la connaître" (J.J.Goldman)	4:17	Dans ma chair
14.	"L'Aigle noir" (live) (Barbara)	4:59	Rendez-vous
15.	"Ma Liberté contre la tienne" (D.Golemanas / P.Obispo)	5:03	Le Mot de passe
16.	"Une Fille de l'Est" (J.J.Goldman)	3:29	Le Mot de passe
17.	"Les Chansons commencent" (live) (J.J.Goldman)	5:13	Ce sera nous
18.	"Mon Chercheur d'or" (D.Golemanas / P.Obispo)	4:32	Le Mot de passe

== Credits ==
=== Editions ===
- Strictly Confidential / EMI Music Publishing : "Rien ne s'arrête"
- Back to Paris / Zone Music : "D'Allemagne", "Mon Mec à moi", "Quand Jimmy dit", "Les Hommes qui passent", "Kennedy Rose"
- Back to Paris / Catalogue Moi-Music : "Mademoiselle chante le blues"
- ADN Music / MDG Productions : "Les Mannequins d'osier"
- Pole Music / Good Good Music : "Entrer dans la lumière", "Ceux qui n'ont rien",
- JRG Editions Musicales / Note de blues : "Il me dit que je suis belle"
- Realsongs / EMI (ASCAP) : "Quand j'ai peur de tout"
- JRG Editions Musicales : "Je voudrais la connaître", "Une Fille de l'Est", "Les Chansons commencent"
- Warner-Chappell Music Publishing : "L'Aigle noir"
- Sony-ATC Music Publishing : "Ma Liberté contre la tienne", "Mon Chercheur d'or"

=== Recording ===
- Mastering : Tom Coyne at Sterling Sound (New York), except "Rien ne s'arrête" : Tim Young at Metropolis (London)
- Photo : André Rau / H&K
- Design : FKGB
- Management : I.T.C. - Zurich, Switzerland (Cyril Prieur, Richard Walter)

== Charts ==
=== Weekly charts ===
Weekly chart performance for Rien ne s'arrête
Chart (2001)	Peak position
Belgian Albums (Ultratop Wallonia)	3
European Albums (Music & Media)	69
Finnish Albums (Suomen virallinen lista)	38
French Compilations (SNEP)	2
German Albums (Offizielle Top 100)	39
Swiss Albums (Schweizer Hitparade)	14

=== Year-end charts ===
2001 year-end chart performance for Rien ne s'arrête
Chart (2001)	Position
Belgian Albums (Ultratop Wallonia)	67
Belgian Francophone Albums (Ultratop Wallonia)	34
French Compilations (SNEP)	14

2002 year-end chart performance for Rien ne s'arrête
Chart (2002)	Position
Belgian Francophone Albums (Ultratop Wallonia)	23

== Certifications and sales ==
Region	Certification	Certified units/sales
Belgium (BRMA)	Gold	25,000^{*}
France (SNEP)	Platinum	300,000^{*}
Switzerland (IFPI Switzerland)	Gold	20,000^{^}
^{*} Sales figures based on certification alone.^{^} Shipments figures based on certification alone.
