= L'ombre de ma voix =

L'ombre de ma voix may refer to:

- L'ombre de ma voix, a 2011 autobiography by Patricia Kaas
- "L'ombre de ma voix", a 2018 song by Tina Arena
