= Kaas chante Piaf à l'Olympia =

Live album by Patricia Kaas
- Released: 28 March 2014
- Genre: Chanson; cabaret

Patricia Kaas chronology
Kaas chante Piaf (2012)	Kaas chante Piaf à l'Olympia (2014)	Patricia Kaas (2016)

Kaas chante Piaf à l'Olympia is a live album/home video by French singer Patricia Kaas. It was released on 28 March 2014 as a two-disc set (DVD/CD). Kaas chante Piaf à l'Olympia contains songs originally performed by French cabaret singer Édith Piaf.

== Track listing ==
Disc one – DVD
No.	Title	Length
1.	"Song for the Little Sparrow" (Générique)
2.	"Mon Dieu"
3.	"L'hommage" (Talk)
4.	"Paris"
5.	"Mon manège à moi"
6.	"C'est un gars"
7.	"La foule"
8.	"Emporte-moi"
9.	"Dark Prelude" (Prélude)
10.	"Milord"
11.	"Le théâtre" (Talk)
12.	"Les amants d'un jour"
13.	"L'étranger"
14.	"Les blouses blanches"
15.	"Mon vieux Lucien"
16.	"Sous le ciel de Paris" (Instrumental)
17.	"Padam, Padam"
18.	"Je t'ai dans la peau"
19.	"La vie en rose"
20.	"The 9th Hour" (Prélude)
21.	"La belle histoire d'amour"
22.	"Hymne à l'amour"
23.	"Non, je ne regrette rien"
24.	"Song for the Little Sparrow" (Épilogue)

Disc two – CD
No.	Title	Length
1.	"Mon Dieu"	4:43
2.	"Je t'ai dans la peau"	3:01
3.	"Milord"	5:07
4.	"Avec ce soleil"	2:44
5.	"C'est un gars"	3:08
6.	"La vie en rose"	5:18
7.	"T'es beau tu sais"	4:06
8.	"Hymne à l'amour"	4:20
9.	"Non, je ne regrette rien"	3:22
10.	"La foule"	3:43
11.	"L'étranger"	3:08
12.	"Les blouses blanches"	4:15
13.	"Padam, Padam"	4:40
14.	"The 9th Hour" (Prélude)	2:33
15.	"La belle histoire d'amour"	4:29

== Charts ==
Chart (2014)	Peak position
Belgian Albums (Ultratop Wallonia)	83
French Albums (SNEP)	73
