= Patricia Kaas (album) =

Studio album by Patricia Kaas
- Released: 11 November 2016
- Genre: Pop
- Language: French
- Label: Warner Music France
- Producer: Jonathan Quarmby; Fin Greenall; Benjamin Constant

Patricia Kaas chronology
Kaas chante Piaf à l'Olympia (2014)	Patricia Kaas (2016)

Singles from Patricia Kaas
- 1. "Le Jour et l'Heure" Released: 20 June 2016; 2. "Madame tout le monde" Released: 14 September 2016

Patricia Kaas is the tenth studio album by French singer Patricia Kaas, released on 11 November 2016 by Warner Warner Music France. In fact, this is the singer's first album in 13 years where only new and original songs are present.

The album was recorded in France at the Paris studios Les Studios Saint Germain and Studio Labomatic in the period from March 2015 to June 2016. The producer was Jonathan Quarmby. Later, the singer said that the album is personal and reflects the events of the last events of her life, Kaas also stated that she decided to touch on acute social topics on the album, the topic of domestic violence, for example, because they are silenced in society for some reason.

On 20 June 2016, the lead single "Le Jour et l'Heure" was released, according to the author, the song was written under the impression of the terrorist attacks in Paris in 2015. The song managed to reach 69th place in the singles chart. On 14 September the second single "Madame tout le monde" was released.

The album itself was released on 11 November 2016. The release of the record coincided with the fiftieth anniversary of the singer and the thirtieth anniversary since the beginning of her creative activity. The album received positive reviews from critics, and also entered the top twenty charts of Belgium, France and Switzerland.

== Track listing ==
Patricia Kaas – Standard edition
No.	Title	Writer(s)	Length
1.	"Adèle"	Ben Mazué	3:07
2.	"Cogne"	Keren Meloul; Rémi Lacroix	3:34
3.	"Madame tout le monde"	Pierre Jouishomme; Aurélie Saada; Jonathan Quarmby; Lacroix	2:48
4.	"Sans tes mains"	Baptiste Bender	3:34
5.	"La Maison en bord de mer"	Lacroix	3:35
6.	"Embrasse"	Lacroix	3:31
7.	"Marre de mon amant"	Mirko Banovic	3:25
8.	"Sans nous"	Mazué	3:55
9.	"Ne l'oubliez jamais"	Davide Esposito	4:35
10.	"Le Jour et l’Heure"	David Verlant; Lacroix	3:26
11.	"La Langue que je parle"	Jean-Jacques Daran	3:08
12.	"Ma météo personnelle"	Quarmby; Lacroix	3:22
13.	"Ma tristesse est n’importe où"	Daran	3:43
Total length:			49:00

Patricia Kaas – Deluxe edition (bonus tracks)
No.	Title	Writer(s)	Length
14.	"Le refuge" (Bonus track)	Lacroix	3:23
15.	"Adèle" (Version acoustique)		2:26
16.	"Sans tes mains" (Version acoustique)		3:08
17.	"Embrasse" (Version acoustique)		2:30
18.	"Cogne" (Version acoustique)		3:25
19.	"Le refuge" (Version acoustique)		3:32

== Charts ==
=== Weekly charts ===
Weekly chart performance for Patricia Kaas
Chart (2016)	Peak position
Belgian Albums (Ultratop Flanders)	69
Belgian Albums (Ultratop Wallonia)	8
Dutch Albums (Album Top 100)	139
French Albums (SNEP)	13
German Albums (Offizielle Top 100)	34
Swiss Albums (Schweizer Hitparade)	10

=== Year-end charts ===
2016 year-end chart performance for Patricia Kaas
Chart (2016–2017)	Position
Belgian Albums (Ultratop Wallonia)	54
French Albums (SNEP)	99

2017 year-end chart performance for Patricia Kaas
Chart (2017)	Position
Belgian Albums (Ultratop Wallonia)	129

== Certifications ==
Certifications for Patricia Kaas
Region	Certification	Certified units/sales
France (SNEP)	Gold	50,000^{‡}
^{‡} Sales+streaming figures based on certification alone.
