= Kaas chante Piaf =

Studio album by Patricia Kaas
- Released: 5 November 2012
- Genre: Chanson; cabaret
- Producer: Abel Korzeniowski

Patricia Kaas chronology
Mademoiselle n'a pas chanté que le blues (2011)	Kaas chante Piaf (2012)	Kaas chante Piaf à l'Olympia (2014)

Singles from Kaas chante Piaf
- 1. "Hymne à l'amour" Released: 15 October 2012; 2. "Avec ce soleil" Released: 27 February 2013

Kaas chante Piaf is the ninth studio album by French singer Patricia Kaas. In most part it consists of songs firstly performed by French cabaret singer Édith Piaf.

== Track listing ==
No.	Title	Writer(s)	Producer(s)	Length
1.	"Mon Dieu"	Michel Vaucaire; Charles Dumont	Abel Korzeniowski	4:40
2.	"Padam, Padam"	Henri Contet; Norbert Glanzberg	Korzeniowski	4:37
3.	"Avec ce soleil"	Jacques Larue; Philippe Gerard	Korzeniowski	2:42
4.	"Milord"	Joseph Mustacchi; Marguerite Monnot	Korzeniowski	5:05
5.	"The 9th Hour" (Prélude)	Korzeniowski	Korzeniowski	2:31
6.	"La Belle Histoire d'amour"	Édith Piaf; Dumont	Korzeniowski	4:12
7.	"Les Amants merveilleux"	Florence Véran; Robert Gall	Korzeniowski	2:35
8.	"Emporte-moi" (Digital deluxe edition)	Francis Lai; Jacques Plante	Korzeniowski	3:52
9.	"T'es beau tu sais"	Henri Contet; Georges Moustaki	Korzeniowski	4:05
10.	"Hymne à l'amour"	Piaf; Monnot	Korzeniowski	4:18
11.	"C'est un gars"	Pierre Roche; Charles Aznavour	Korzeniowski	3:06
12.	"Song for the Little Sparrow" (Ouverture)	Korzeniowski	Korzeniowski	3:22
13.	"La Foule"	Michel Rivgauche; Angel Cabral	Korzeniowski	3:54
14.	"Mon manège à moi"	Jean Constantin; Norbert Glanzberg	Korzeniowski	3:00
15.	"La vie en rose"	Piaf; Louis Guglielmi	Korzeniowski	5:17
16.	"Non, je ne regrette rien"	Vaucaire; Dumont	Korzeniowski	4:56
17.	"Je t'ai dans la peau"	Jacques Pills; Gilbert Bécaud	Korzeniowski	3:01
18.	"Kaas chante Piaf (EPK)" (Digital deluxe edition)			7:57

== Charts ==
=== Weekly charts ===
Chart (2012–13)	Peak position
Austrian Albums (Ö3 Austria)	67
Belgian Albums (Ultratop Flanders)	45
Belgian Albums (Ultratop Wallonia)	11
Dutch Albums (Album Top 100)	89
Finnish Albums (Suomen virallinen lista)	17
French Albums (SNEP)	6
German Albums (Offizielle Top 100)	28
Polish Albums (ZPAV)	22
Swiss Albums (Schweizer Hitparade)	8

=== Year-end charts ===
Chart (2012)	Position
Belgian Albums (Ultratop Wallonia)	77
French Albums (SNEP)	60
Chart (2013)	Position
Belgian Albums (Ultratop Wallonia)	151

== Certifications and sales ==
Region	Certification	Certified units/sales
France (SNEP)	Platinum	100,000^{*}
Summaries
Worldwide	—	250,000
^{*} Sales figures based on certification alone.
