= And Now... Ladies and Gentlemen =

- Theatrical release poster
- Directed by: Claude Lelouch
- Written by: Claude Lelouch; Pierre Leroux; Pierre Uytterhoeven
- Produced by: Claude Lelouch
- Starring: Jeremy Irons; Patricia Kaas; Thierry Lhermitte; Alessandra Martines
- Cinematography: Pierre-William Glenn
- Edited by: Hélène de Luze
- Music by: Michel Legrand
- Distributed by: Paramount Classics (English-speaking territories); SND Films (France)
- Release date: 29 May 2002
- Running time: 128 minutes
- Countries: France; United Kingdom
- Languages: French; English; Arabic; Italian

And Now... Ladies and Gentlemen is a 2002 thriller film directed by Claude Lelouch and starring Jeremy Irons and Patricia Kaas. Patricia Kaas also released a song with the same title on her 2002 album Piano Bar. Tracks from the album, which according to the cover notes were inspired by the film, were used in the movie. It was screened out of competition at the 2002 Cannes Film Festival.

== Premise ==
Valentin (Jeremy Irons), a gentleman burglar like Arsène Lupin, is wanted by the police. He embarks on a sailboat for a tour of the world. Jane (Patricia Kaas) dreams of leaving the American-style bar in which she works as a jazz singer. Valentin and Jane fall in love with each other. While coping with memory problems, they find themselves in a hotel on the coast of Morocco, where a jewellery theft has taken place.

== Cast ==
- Jeremy Irons - Valentin Valentin
- Patricia Kaas - Jane Lester
- Thierry Lhermitte - Thierry
- Alessandra Martines - Françoise
- Claudia Cardinale - Madame Falconetti
- Jean-Marie Bigard - Dr. Lamy/Pharmacist
- Ticky Holgado - Boubou
- Yvan Attal - David
- Amidou - Police Inspector
- Sylvie Loeillet - Soleil
- Constantin Alexandrov - Monsieur Falconetti
- Stéphane Ferrara - Sam Hernandez, the Boxer
- Samuel Labarthe - Trumpet Player
- Paul Freeman - English Customer
- Souad Amidou - Chambermaid

== Reception ==
And Now... Ladies and Gentlemen received mixed reviews. On the review aggregator website Rotten Tomatoes, the film has an approval rating of 47%, based on 74 reviews, with an average rating of 5.5/10. The website's consensus reads, "The plot is convoluted and awash in suds."
