= Cindy Sander =

French singer (born 1978)

Cindy Sander (born Sandmeier 31 March 1978 in Creutzwald) is a French singer.

== Biography ==
She has been married to Sébastien Braun since 1998 and is the mother of Enzo, born on 26 May 2006.

According to the singer, she tried to participate in the 2001 Eurovision with her unreleased track Mensonges, and again in 2006 with another song.

In 2008, the general public discovered her in the French television show Nouvelle Star on M6. She did not win, but then she saw her notability maintained by an Internet phenomenon and participated in several other programs for the French television. Her song "Papillon de lumière" reached number 14 on the French SNEP Singles Chart. During that same year, Cindy Sander participated in her own reality TV show called Bienvenue chez les Sander, in which she showed her daily life with her family.

== Discography ==
=== Albums ===
- 2007 : Plus fort que l'amour

=== Singles ===
- 1989 : "Notre Mélodie" – duet with Tanguy Cordary (7")
- 2000 : "Mensonges"
- 2000 : "D'Amour" / "Papillon de nuit"
- 2008 : "Papillon de lumière"
- 2009 : "Le Secret de nous"
- 2017 : "Près de Moi"
- 2023 : "Let Go"
