= Kabaret =

Studio album by Patricia Kaas
- Released: 15 December 2008
- Genre: Chanson, jazz
- Length: 46:00
- Label: Columbia, Sony
- Producer: Patricia Kaas

Patricia Kaas chronology
Toute la musique... (2005)	Kabaret (2008)	Kabaret: Live au Casino de Paris (2009)

Singles from Kabaret
- 1. "Kabaret" Released: January 2009; 2. "Et s'il fallait le faire" Released: 1 February 2009

Kabaret is the eighth studio album by French singer Patricia Kaas. It was first released digitally on 15 December 2008. The physical release followed in Switzerland, Belgium, Germany and Russia on 6 February 2009, and in a double CD edition in France on 30 March 2009.

Kabaret, written with a K, like Kaas and the German term Kabarett, is a tribute to the 1930 decade, the sparkling entertainers like Greta Garbo, Suzy Solidor, Martha Graham and others.

The song "Une derniére fois" was written by Kaas, and is therefore her first ever solo written song.

With all-time partner Fred Helbert, Kaas arranged the songs "Le jour se lève", "Et s'il fallait le faire" and "Falling in Love Again."

== Track listing ==
French edition
No.	Title	Writer(s)	Producer(s)	Length
1.	"Addicte aux héroïnes"	Brifo; Tanguy Dairaine	Patricia Kaas; Brifo	2:16
2.	"La chance jamais ne dure"	Hermann Thieme; Hildegard Knef; Stephane Laporte	Kaas; Arnaud de Bosredon; Charles Delaporte; Hugues Payen	3:40
3.	"Le jour se lève"	François Bernheim; Jacqueline Nero	Kaas; Frédéric Helbert	4:39
4.	"Une dernière fois"	Brifo; Kaas; Dairaine	Kaas; Brifo	4:34
5.	"Kabaret"	Artie Kaplan; Arthur Kornfel; Brifo; Dairaine	Kaas; Helbert; Michel Cusson	4:01
6.	"Faites entrer les clowns"	Stephen Sondheim; Laporte	Kaas; Brifo	3:30
7.	"Falling in Love Again"	Friedrich Hollaender; Sammy Lerner	Kaas; Helbert	3:21
8.	"Pigalle" (Interlude)	Bosredon; Delaporte; Payen	Kaas; Bosredon; Delaporte; Payen	3:00
9.	"Solo"	Blair MacKichan; Diane Birch; Laporte	Kaas; Bosredon; Delaporte; Payen	3:39
10.	"Je t'aime encore"	Jimmy MacCarthy; Dairaine	Kaas; Brifo	5:01
11.	"Et s'il fallait le faire"	Anze Lazio; Fred Blondin	Kaas; Helbert	3:47
12.	"Mon piano rouge"	Brifo	Kaas; Brifo	4:33

International edition
No.	Title	Writer(s)	Producer(s)	Length
1.	"Addicte aux héroïnes"	Brifo; Dairaine	Kaas; Brifo	2:16
2.	"La chance jamais ne dure"	Thieme; Knef; Laporte	Kaas; Bosredon; Delaporte; Payen	3:40
3.	"Le jour se lève"	Bernheim; Nero	Kaas; Helbert	4:39
4.	"Une dernière fois"	Brifo; Kaas; Dairaine	Kaas; Brifo	4:34
5.	"Kabaret"	Kaplan; Kornfel; Brifo; Dairaine	Kaas; Helbert; Cusson	4:01
6.	"Faites entrer les clowns"	Sondheim; Laporte	Kaas; Brifo	3:30
7.	"Falling in Love Again"	Hollaender; Lerner	Kaas; Helbert	3:21
8.	"Pigalle" (Interlude)	Bosredon; Delaporte; Payen	Kaas; Bosredon; Delaporte; Payen	3:00
9.	"Alone"	MacKichan; Birch	Kaas; Bosredon; Delaporte; Payen	3:38
10.	"Still in Love"	MacCarthy	Kaas; Brifo	5:00
11.	"Et s'il fallait le faire"	Lazio; Blondin	Kaas; Helbert	3:47
12.	"Mon piano rouge"	Brifo	Kaas; Brifo	4:33
13.	"September Song"	Maxwell Anderson; Kurt Weill	Kaas; Brifo	5:32
14.	"Solo" (Special edition bonus track)	MacKichan; Birch; Laporte	Kaas; Bosredon; Delaporte; Payen	3:36
15.	"Je t'aime encore" (Special edition bonus track)	MacCarthy; Dairaine	Kaas; Brifo	5:00

German edition
No.	Title	Writer(s)	Producer(s)	Length
1.	"Addicte aux héroïnes"	Brifo; Dairaine	Kaas; Brifo	2:16
2.	"Das Glück kennt nur Minuten"	Thieme; Knef	Kaas; Bosredon; Delaporte; Payen	3:40
3.	"Le jour se lève"	Bernheim; Nero	Kaas; Helbert	4:39
4.	"Une dernière fois"	Brifo; Kaas; Dairaine	Kaas; Brifo	4:34
5.	"Kabaret"	Kaplan; Kornfel; Brifo; Dairaine	Kaas; Helbert; Cusson	4:01
6.	"Wo sind die Clowns"	Sondheim; Michael Kunze	Kaas; Brifo	3:29
7.	"Falling in Love Again"	Hollaender; Lerner	Kaas; Helbert	3:21
8.	"Pigalle" (Interlude)	Bosredon; Delaporte; Payen	Kaas; Bosredon; Delaporte; Payen	3:00
9.	"Alone"	MacKichan; Birch	Kaas; Bosredon; Delaporte; Payen	3:38
10.	"Je t'aime encore"	MacCarthy; Dairaine	Kaas; Brifo	5:01
11.	"Et s'il fallait le faire"	Lazio; Blondin	Kaas; Helbert	3:47
12.	"Mon piano rouge"	Brifo	Kaas; Brifo	4:33
13.	"September Song"	Anderson; Weill	Kaas; Brifo	5:32
14.	"Hard Work" (Limited edition bonus track)	John Handy	Kaas	3:16

Russian edition
No.	Title	Writer(s)	Producer(s)	Length
1.	"Addicte aux héroïnes"	Brifo; Dairaine	Kaas; Brifo	2:16
2.	"La chance jamais ne dure"	Thieme; Knef; Laporte	Kaas; Bosredon; Delaporte; Payen	3:40
3.	"Le jour se lève"	Bernheim; Nero	Kaas; Helbert	4:39
4.	"Une dernière fois"	Brifo; Kaas; Dairaine	Kaas; Brifo	4:34
5.	"Kabaret"	Kaplan; Kornfel; Brifo; Dairaine	Kaas; Helbert; Cusson	4:01
6.	"Faites entrer les clowns"	Sondheim; Laporte	Kaas; Brifo	3:30
7.	"Falling in Love Again"	Hollaender; Lerner	Kaas; Helbert	3:21
8.	"Pigalle" (Interlude)	Bosredon; Delaporte; Payen	Kaas; Bosredon; Delaporte; Payen	3:00
9.	"Solo"	MacKichan; Birch; Laporte	Kaas; Bosredon; Delaporte; Payen	3:39
10.	"Je t'aime encore"	MacCarthy; Dairaine	Kaas; Brifo	5:01
11.	"Et s'il fallait le faire"	Lazio; Blondin	Kaas; Helbert	3:47
12.	"Mon piano rouge"	Brifo	Kaas; Brifo	4:33
13.	"Mne Nravitsya"	Marina Tsvetaeva; Mikael Tariverdiev	Kaas	3:34
14.	"Hard Work" (Bonus track)	Handy	Kaas	3:15
15.	"September Song" (Bonus track)	Anderson; Weill	Kaas; Brifo	5:32
16.	"Still in Love" (Special edition bonus track)	MacCarthy	Kaas; Brifo	5:01

French live second CD
No.	Title	Writer(s)	Producer(s)	Length
1.	"K-Thème"	Helbert	Helbert	2:58
2.	"Mon mec à moi"	Didier Barbelivien; François Bernheim	Helbert	4:23
3.	"Les hommes qui passent"	Barbelivien; Bernheim	Helbert	4:45
4.	"Kabaret"	Kaplan; Kornfel; Brifo; Dairaine	Helbert	4:11
5.	"Pigalle" (Interlude)	Bosredon; Delaporte; Payen	Helbert	5:26
6.	"Falling in Love Again"	Hollaender; Lerner	Helbert	3:52
7.	"D'Allemagne"	Barbelivien; Bernheim	Helbert	5:22
8.	"Une fille de l'Est"	Jean-Jacques Goldman	Helbert	4:38
9.	"Solo"	MacKichan; Birch; Laporte	Helbert	5:29
10.	"La chance jamais ne dure"	Thieme; Knef; Laporte	Helbert	3:42
11.	"Il me dit que je suis belle"	Goldman	Helbert	5:10
12.	"Elle voulait jouer cabaret"	Barbelivien	Helbert	5:07
13.	"Mademoiselle chante le blues"	Barbelivien; Bob Mehdi	Helbert	8:17
14.	"K-Interlude"	Helbert	Helbert	2:50
15.	"Entrer dans la lumière"	Barbelivien; Bernheim	Helbert	4:17
16.	"Et s'il fallait le faire"	Lazio; Blondin	Helbert	5:06

International special edition bonus DVD
No.	Title	Length
1.	"Et s'il fallait le faire" (Music video)
2.	"Studio recording sketch"
3.	"Photo schoot sketch"
4.	"Kabaret tour concert sketch"

Russian special edition bonus DVD
No.	Title	Length
1.	"Album"
2.	"Patricia Kaas – Choice of France"
3.	"Patricia in Russia"
4.	"Et s'il fallait le faire" (Video-clip)
5.	"Kabaret" (Video-clip)
6.	"Photo gallery"

== Charts and certifications ==
=== Weekly charts ===
Chart (2009)	Peak position
Belgian Albums (Ultratop Flanders)	38
Belgian Albums (Ultratop Wallonia)	4
Finnish Albums (Suomen virallinen lista)	7
French Albums (SNEP)	15
German Albums (Offizielle Top 100)	32
Greek Albums (IFPI)	7
Polish Albums (ZPAV)	19
Swiss Albums (Schweizer Hitparade)	3

=== Certifications and sales ===
Region	Certification	Certified units/sales
France (SNEP)	Gold	50,000
Russia (NFPF)	Diamond	200,000^{*}
Summaries
Worldwide	—	800,000
^{*} Sales figures based on certification alone.

== Release history ==
Region	Date	Label	Format	Catalog
World	15 December 2008	Sony Music	Digital	
Europe	6 February 2009	Sony Music	CD	3 770001 708003
France	30 March 2009	Sony Music	2CD	6 00753 17488 3
