= Sexe fort =

Studio album by Patricia Kaas
- Released: 1 December 2003
- Recorded: Brussels, Belgium; Capri, Italy
- Genre: Jazz rock, chanson
- Label: Sony Musique, Columbia

Patricia Kaas chronology
Piano Bar (2002)	Sexe fort (2003)	Toute la musique... (2005)

Singles from Sexes fort
- 1. "Où sont les hommes" Released: 2003

Professional ratings
Review scores
Source	Rating
AllMusic	2.5/5 stars

Sexe fort (Eng: Stronger Gender) is the name of the seventh studio album recorded by the French artist Patricia Kaas. It was released in 2003 and achieved success in many countries, including Belgium, Switzerland and France, but its sales were less than Kaas' previous albums.

== Background ==
This seventh studio album was released on December 1, 2003.

As for the previous albums, Kaas was surrounded by famous songwriters who had already worked with her. For example, Jean-Jacques Goldman participated with the song "C'est la faute à la vie" (Eng: "That's the Problem with Life") and "On pourrait" (Eng: "We Could"), which he also produced himself; by the way, this last song was recorded as a duet with the Swiss artist Stephan Eicher. Pascal Obispo, who was particularly involved in the composing of Le Mot de passe, wrote the song "L'Abbé Caillou" (Eng: "The Abbot Caillou"), whose title is a play with and a tribute to the Abbé Pierre. French singers and songwriters Patrick Fiori, Louis Bertignac and Renaud also participated in the writing of at least one song.

This album was followed by a tour performed by the singer around the world, the seventh one.

== Chart performances and critical reception ==
In France, the album was not as successful as Kaas' first five studio albums. It went to #9 on November 30, 2003, then dropped almost every week. It managed to stabilize in the low positions and totaled only 12 weeks in the top 50, 15 weeks in the top 100 and 39 weeks on the chart (top 200). It was certified double gold and appeared respectively at #70 and #150 on 2003 and 2004 End of the Year Charts.

In Belgium (Wallonia), the album started at #35 on December 6, 2003, before climbing to #5 and finally reached #3. However, it fell off the top ten after its fourth week and dropped slowly on the chart, until its 16th week.

In Switzerland, the album was charted for 14 weeks, from December 14, 2003, to March 21, 2004. It peaked at #6 in it second week and remained for three weeks in the top ten, and ten weeks in the top 50. It achieved gold status.

The album met a moderate success in Finland, peaking at #31 with only two weeks on the chart, and #55 in Germany.

Following the release of Sexe fort, Kaas received a particular distinction on December 8, 2003, when she received the First Class Order of Merit of the Federal Republic of Germany for her contribution to friendship between France and Germany, an honour that until then had been awarded to only a few international artists.

== Track listing ==
#	Title	Length
1.	"Où sont les hommes" (L.Ivanne / B.Ghigilone)	3:49
2.	"L'Abbé Caillou" (P.Y.Lebert / P.Obispo)	4:38
3.	"Je ne veux plus pardonner" (D.Manet / S.Campanile)	3:25
4.	"La nuit est mauve" (Renaud / F.Bernheim)	4:18
5.	"C'est les Femmes qui mènent la danse" (D.Manet)	3:31
6.	"On pourrait" (duet with Stephan Eicher) (J.J.Goldman)	3:44
7.	"J'en tremblerai encore" (D.Manet)	3:05
8.	"Je t'aime, je ne t'aime plus" (E.Roda Gil / D.Manet)	2:55
9.	"C'est la faute à la vie" (J.J.Goldman)	3:38
10.	"Je le garde pour toi" (E.Andreu - J.Kapler / J.Kapler)	3:21
11.	"La Blessure" (S.Campanile / S.Moraillon / P.M.Dupont)	3:18
12.	"Des regrets" (P.B.Carmen)	4:58
13.	"Tu pourras dire" (M.J.Zarb - P.Fiori / N.Kamiel - P.Fiori)	3:30
14.	"Peut-être que peut-être" (F.Cabrel - O.Dodone / B.Le Roux)	3:49
15.	"Une question de temps" (D.Manet / L.Bertignac)	3:45

== Credits ==
=== Recording ===
- Arranged by Frédéric Helbert
- Except : Jean-Jacques Goldman and Erick Benzi (6, 9), Pierre Jaconelli (2), Frédéric Helbert and Louis Bertignac (15), Frédéric Helbert and Pascal B.Carmen (12), Thierry "Tyty" Blanchard and J.Kapler (10)
- Executive producer and vocal direction : Richard Walter
- Engineer, mixing : Bruno Fourrier
- Assistant : Matthieu Dallaporta
- Additional engineers : Erick Benzi and Phil Delire
- Except mixing : Erick Benzi and le Triangle (6, 9), Bruno Fourrier and Pierre Jaconelli (2), Thierry Blanchard "Tyty" (12)
- Assistants Capri : Manuel Farolfi, Riccardo Durante
- Artistic direction : Michel Boulanger
- In charge of production : Richard Walter Productions (Martine Trendel, Ghislaine Real)
- Recorded and mixed at Studios ICP (Brussels, Belgium), Capri Digital Studio (Capri, Italy)
- Mastering : JC Beaudon à Translab
- Artwork : peggy.m / Malo
- Photos : peggy.m
- Light conception : Hamoudi Laggoune from C4 Productions
- Make up : Aurélia Jugenet
- Hairdresser : Jean-Paul Ealet
- Management : ITC (Richard Walter, Cyril Prieur), Zurich, Switzerland

=== Musicians and vocalists ===
- Keyboards, syncs and proclamations : Frédéric Helbert (1, 3-5, 7, 8, 11-15), Matthieu Vaughan (2), Pancho, Erick Benzi and Charly Valora (6, 9), Thierry "Tyty" Blanchard (10)
- Guitars : Frédéric Helbert, Milton Mc Donald, Pierre Jaconelli, Pascal B.Carmen, Louis Bertignac, Jeff Bourassin, André Hampartzoumian, Bruno Le Roux
- Bass : Nicolas Fiszman, Bernard Viguié
- Drum kit : Roy Martin, Ian Thomas, Amaury Blanchard
- Harmonica : "Diabolo" (3, 4, 7, 13)
- Piano : Jean-Jacques Goldman (9)
- First violins : Mark Steylaerts, Marian Taché, Vadin Tsiboulevsky, Eric Baeten, Gudrun Vercampt, Karel Ingelaere, Maurits Goosens, Eva Zylka
- Second violins : Véronique Gilis, Bart Lammens, Carol Minor, Alissa Vaitsner, Eva Vermeeren, Dirk Uten
- Violas : Marc Tooten, Philippe Allard, Jeroen Robbrecht, Liesbeth De Lombaert, Katrien Smedts
- Cellos : Karel Steylaerts, Lode Vercampt, Herwig Coryn, Sigrid Van Den Bogaerde
- Double bass : Koenraad Hofman, Charice Adriaansen
- Background vocals : Dominique "Doudou" Greffier (1, 3, 12, 15), Dark Vador (1,3), Pascal Obispo (2), Jean-Jacques Goldman and Erick Benzi (6), Louis Bertignac (15)

== Charts ==
=== Weekly charts ===
Chart (2003–04)	Peak position
Belgian Albums (Ultratop Flanders)	99
Belgian Albums (Ultratop Wallonia)	3
Finnish Albums (Suomen virallinen lista)	31
European Albums (Top 100)	41
French Albums (SNEP)	9
German Albums (Offizielle Top 100)	55
Swiss Albums (Schweizer Hitparade)	6

=== Monthly charts ===
Chart (2003)	Peak position
Russian Albums (NFPF)	10

=== Year-end charts ===
Chart (2003)	Position
French Albums (SNEP)	70
Chart (2004)	Position
Belgian Albums (Ultratop Wallonia)	90
French Albums (SNEP)	150
Swiss Albums (Schweizer Hitparade)	74

== Certifications and sales ==
Region	Certification	Certified units/sales
France (SNEP)	2× Gold	200,000^{*}
Switzerland (IFPI Switzerland)	Gold	20,000^{^}
^{*} Sales figures based on certification alone.^{^} Shipments figures based on certification alone.
