= France in the Eurovision Song Contest 2009 =

- Eurovision Song Contest 2009
- Participating broadcaster: France Télévisions
- Country: France
- Selection process: Internal selection
- Announcement date: Artist: 28 January 2009; Song: 9 February 2009

Competing entry
- Song: "Et s'il fallait le faire"
- Artist: Patricia Kaas
- Songwriters: Fred Blondin; Anse Lazio

Placement
- Final result: 8th, 107 points

Participation chronology

France was represented at the Eurovision Song Contest 2009 with the song "Et s'il fallait le faire", written by Fred Blondin and Anse Lazio, and performed by Patricia Kaas. The French participating broadcaster, France Télévisions, internally selected its entry for the contest. Patricia Kaas was officially announced by France 3 as the French representative on 28 January 2009 and later the song was presented to the public on 1 February 2009.

As a member of the "Big Four", France automatically qualified to compete in the final of the Eurovision Song Contest. Performing in position 3, France placed eighth out of the 25 participating countries with 107 points.

== Background ==
Prior to the 2009 contest, France Télévisions and its predecessor national broadcasters, have participated in the Eurovision Song Contest representing France fifty times RTF's debut in 1956. They first won the contest in 1958 with "Dors, mon amour" performed by André Claveau. In the 1960s, they won three times, with "Tom Pillibi" performed by Jacqueline Boyer in 1960, "Un premier amour" performed by Isabelle Aubret in 1962, and "Un jour, un enfant" performed by Frida Boccara, who won in 1969 in a four-way tie with the Netherlands, Spain, and the United Kingdom. Their fifth – and so far latest – victory came in 1977 with "L'oiseau et l'enfant" performed by Marie Myriam. They has also finished second four times, with Paule Desjardins in 1957, Catherine Ferry in 1976, Joëlle Ursull in 1990, and Amina in 1991 (who lost out to Sweden's Carola in a tie-break). In the 21st century, France has had less success, only making the top ten two times, with "Je n'ai que mon âme" performed by Natasha St-Pier finishing fourth in 2001 and "Il faut du temps" by Sandrine François finishing fifth in 2002. In 2008, they finished in nineteenth place with the song "Divine" performed by Sébastien Tellier.

As part of its duties as participating broadcaster, France Télévisions organises the selection of its entry in the Eurovision Song Contest and broadcasts the event in the country. The broadcaster confirmed that it would participate in the 2009 contest on 18 July 2008. The French broadcaster had used both national finals and internal selection to choose its entry in the past. The French entries from 2005 to 2007 were selected via a national final that featured several competing acts. In 2008, the broadcaster opted to internally select the French entry, a procedure that was continued in order to select the 2009 entry.

== Before Eurovision ==
=== Internal selection ===
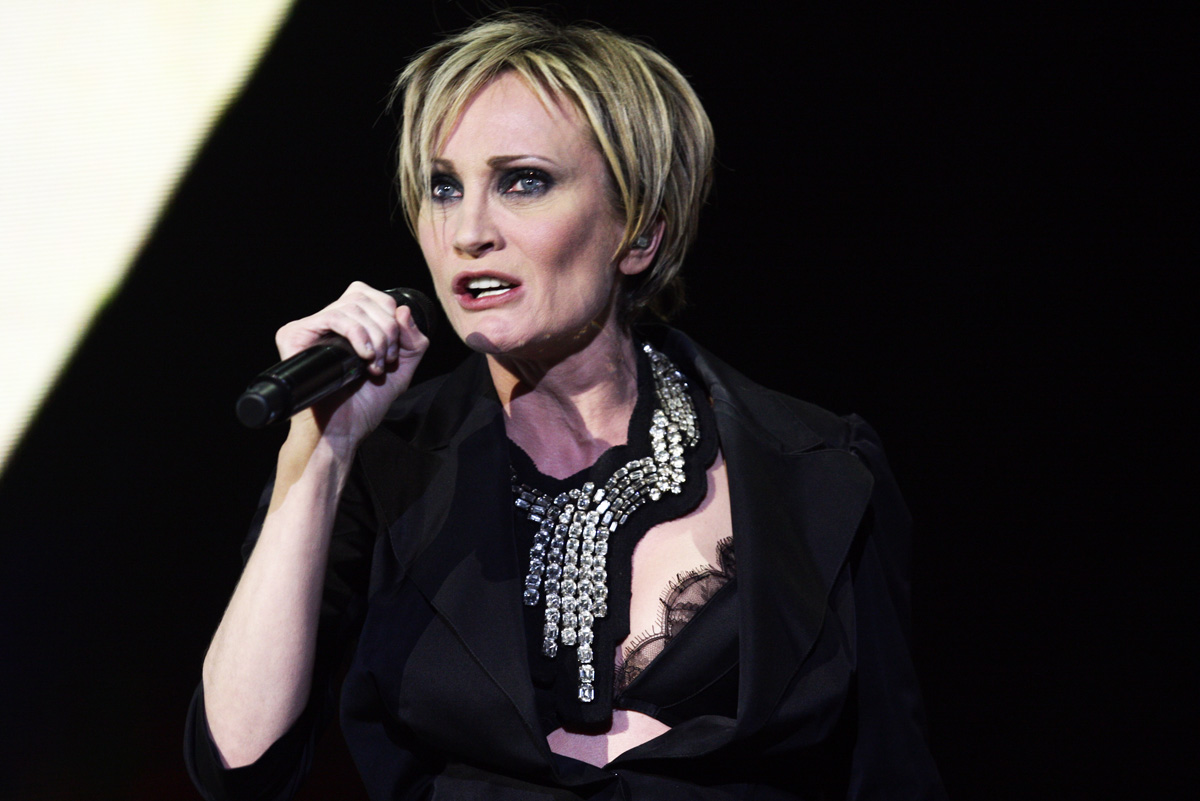
Patricia Kaas was internally selected to represent France in the Eurovision Song Contest 2009

France 3 announced in late 2008 that the French entry for the Eurovision Song Contest 2009 would be selected internally after requesting proposals from record companies. The organisation of the internal selection was headed by the French Head of Delegation for the Eurovision Song Contest Bruno Berberes. Among the artists considered by France 3 before the broadcaster finalised their decision internally included Caprice, Cindy Sander and Mourad Bouraoui.

On 28 January 2009, it was announced during the France 3 talk show programme Vivement dimanche, hosted by Michel Drucker, that the French entrant for the Eurovision Song Contest 2009 would be Patricia Kaas. Information that Kaas would represent France at the Eurovision Song Contest 2009 was leaked on 10 January 2009 by Belgian newspaper La Meuse. Her song "Et s'il fallait le faire" was written by Fred Blondin and Anse Lazio, and was edited and remixed at the request of the French broadcaster since the song exceeded three minutes in its original version which had already been released as the first single from her forthcoming album Kabaret. The entry was formally presented to the public on 9 February 2009 during a press conference held at the Headquarters of France 3 in Paris.

=== Promotion ===
Patricia Kaas made several appearances across Europe to specifically promote "Et s'il fallait le faire" as the French Eurovision entry along with her album Kabaret, which was released on 15 December 2008. Between January and April, Patricia Kaas performed around 40 concerts which were held across various European countries, including a performance during the Russian Eurovision national final on 7 March. In addition to her international appearances, Kaas also promoted "Et s'il fallait le faire" in France, performing the song on 15 March during the NRJ 12 talent show Star Academy in a duet with contestant Quentin Mosimann.

== At Eurovision ==
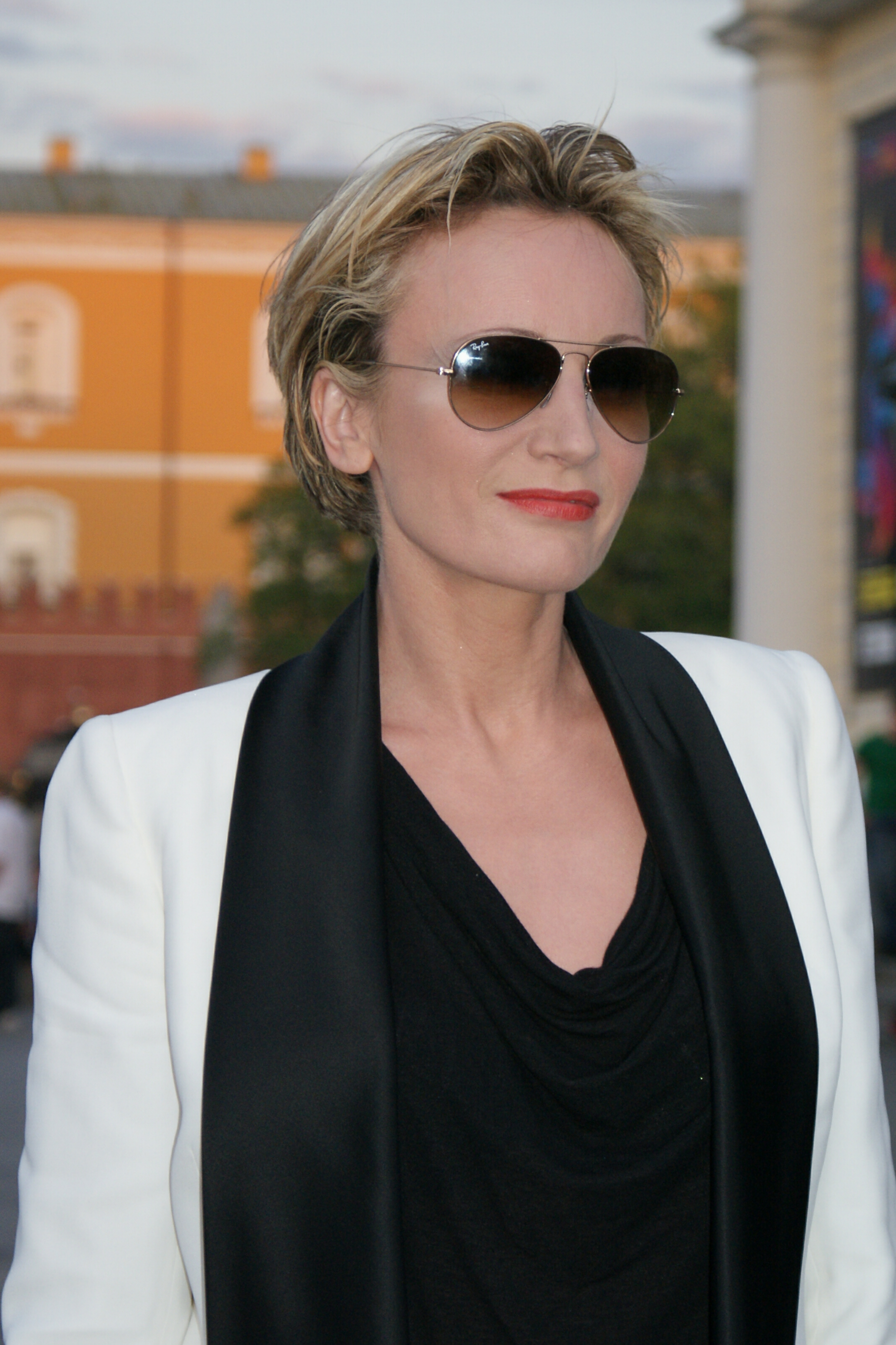
Patricia Kaas at the Eurovision Song Contest 2009

According to Eurovision rules, all nations with the exceptions of the host country and the "Big Four" (France, Germany, Spain and the United Kingdom) are required to qualify from one of two semi-finals in order to compete for the final; the top nine songs from each semi-final as determined by televoting progress to the final, and a tenth was determined by back-up juries. As a member of the "Big 4", France automatically qualified to compete in the final on 16 May 2009. In addition to their participation in the final, France is also required to broadcast and vote in one of the two semi-finals. During the semi-final allocation draw on 30 January 2009, France was assigned to broadcast and vote in the second semi-final on 14 May 2009.

In France, the second semi-final was broadcast on France 4 with commentary by Peggy Olmi and Yann Renoard, while the final was broadcast live on France 3 with commentary by Cyril Hanouna and Julien Courbet. The French spokesperson, who announced the French votes during the final, was Yann Renoard.

=== Final ===
Patricia Kaas took part in technical rehearsals on 9 and 10 May, followed by dress rehearsals on 15 and 16 May. This included the jury final on 15 May where the professional juries of each country watched and voted on the competing entries. The running order for the semi-finals and final was decided by through another draw on 16 March 2009 and France was subsequently placed to perform in position 3, following the entry from Israel and before the entry from Sweden.

The French performance featured Patricia Kaas on stage alone dressed in a blue dress. The stage was predominately dark and the LED screens displayed moving stairs and a stylized letter "K", which is the logo of Patricia Kaas. The screens located on top of the stage displayed the lyrics of the song. The LED screens and stage lighting were switched off which focused on Kaas who danced at the conclusion of the performance. France placed eighth in the final, scoring 107 points.

=== Voting ===
The voting system for 2009 involved each country awarding points from 1-8, 10 and 12, with the points in the final being decided by 50 percent public televoting and 50 percent from a jury deliberation. Each nation's jury consisted of five music industry professionals who are citizens of the country they represent. This jury was asked to judge each contestant based on: vocal capacity; the stage performance; the song's composition and originality; and the overall impression by the act. In addition, no member of a national jury could be related in any way to any of the competing acts in such a way that they cannot vote impartially and independently.

Following the release of the full split voting by the EBU after the conclusion of the competition, it was revealed that France had placed seventeenth with the public televote and fourth with the jury vote. In the public vote, France scored 54 points and in the jury vote the nation scored 164 points.

Below is a breakdown of points awarded to France and awarded by France in the second semi-final and grand final of the contest, and the breakdown of the jury voting and televoting conducted during the two shows:

==== Points awarded to France ====
Points awarded to France (Final)
Score	Country
12 points	
10 points	Russia
8 points	
7 points	Belarus; Slovenia; Switzerland
6 points	Armenia; Bosnia and Herzegovina; Greece; Iceland; Lithuania; Netherlands
5 points	Israel; Latvia
4 points	Finland
3 points	Andorra; Germany; Ireland; Serbia; Spain; Ukraine
2 points	Albania; Denmark
1 point	Belgium; Montenegro; Norway; United Kingdom

==== Points awarded by France ====
Points awarded by France (Semi-final 2)
Score	Country
12 points	Serbia
10 points	Azerbaijan
8 points	Estonia
7 points	Moldova
6 points	Greece
5 points	Albania
4 points	Poland
3 points	Norway
2 points	Lithuania
1 point	Ireland

Points awarded by France (Final)
Score	Country
12 points	Turkey
10 points	Israel
8 points	Norway
7 points	Portugal
6 points	Armenia
5 points	Denmark
4 points	United Kingdom
3 points	Germany
2 points	Sweden
1 point	Azerbaijan

==== Detailed voting results ====
The following members comprised the French jury:

- Corinne Hermès – singer, winner of the Eurovision Song Contest 1983
- Jean Paul Cara – songwriter, co-composer of the Eurovision Song Contest 1977 winning song "L'oiseau et l'enfant"
- Lionel Rivera – music producer
- Marianne Jaulin – television producer
- Marie Jo Zarb – songwriter

Detailed voting results from France (Final)
R/O	Country	Results			Points
R/O	Country	Jury	Televoting	Combined	Points
01	Lithuania	3		3	
02	Israel	12	7	19	10
03	France				
04	Sweden		5	5	2
05	Croatia				
06	Portugal		10	10	7
07	Iceland				
08	Greece		1	1	
09	Armenia	1	8	9	6
10	Russia				
11	Azerbaijan	2	3	5	1
12	Bosnia and Herzegovina				
13	Moldova				
14	Malta				
15	Estonia	5		5	
16	Denmark	8		8	5
17	Germany	6		6	3
18	Turkey	7	12	19	12
19	Albania				
20	Norway	10	6	16	8
21	Ukraine				
22	Romania				
23	United Kingdom	4	2	6	4
24	Finland				
25	Spain		4	4	
