= Piano Bar (Patricia Kaas album) =

Studio album by Patricia Kaas
- Released: April 23, 2002
- Genre: Chanson, pop
- Label: Sony Musique, Columbia

Patricia Kaas chronology
Rien ne s'arrête (2001)	Piano Bar (2002)	Sexe fort (2003)

Piano Bar is the name of the sixth studio album recorded by the French artist Patricia Kaas. It was released in 2002. Although it was less successful in France, a country in which Kaas' albums are generally well-received, it had higher sales and chartings in other countries such as Germany, Russia, USA, UK and Finland.

== Background ==
In 2002, Sony BMG decided to publish the singer's first best of, Rien ne s'arrête, which achieved a good success. At the same time, Kaas started her acting career in Claude Lelouch's film And Now... Ladies and Gentlemen, with Jeremy Irons. To accompany the film, the concept album Piano Bar By Patricia Kaas was released in 2002, which was explicitly not a soundtrack to the film (the real soundtrack has never been released). Piano Bar was the sixth album of the singer, but the first one published that was sung mainly in English, and is a tribute to the great French chanson artists of history.

The album contains cover versions of "Where Do I Begin", which was originally on the soundtrack to Love Story, and an English version of Jacques Brel's "Ne me quitte pas" (Eng: "Don't leave me"), re-entitled "If You Go Away". There are also a cover version of Yves Montand's song "Les Feuilles mortes", and another of Gilbert Bécaud, "Et Maintenant", under the title "What Now My Love".

== Critical reception ==
Professional ratings
Review scores
Source	Rating
Allmusic	3/5 stars

About this album, Allmusic said : "The end result is a lovely, winning album, another fine recording by a fine vocalist".

== Charts performance ==
In France, the album had a moderate success, It started at #14 on April 14, 2002, then reached #10 in its second and sixth week, but was unable to climb higher. It remained for nine weeks in the top 20, 22 weeks in the top 50, 26 weeks in the top 100 and 30 weeks on the chart. Even if it was certified double gold, sales were less in comparison with the previous albums. By contrast, Piano Bar reached #12 in Germany, which was the second most successful album of the singer in this country.

In Belgium (Wallonia), the album reached #6 debuted at #35 on April 27, 2002, jumped to #9 and finally reached #6 for two consecutive weeks. It totaled six weeks in the top ten, stabilized in the top 20, then dropped quickly, and deseappered after its 21 weeks.

In Switzerland, the album peak at #6 too. It hit this position in its second week, on May 5, 2002, before dropping first slowly, then quickly, remaining for ten weeks in the top 50 and 24 weeks on the chart (top 100). It achieved Gold status.

The album hit only #38 in Austria, and for the first time in Kaas' career, one of her albums was charted in New Zealand, peaking at #35 in its second and last week, on April 20, 2003.

== Track listing ==
#	Title	Length
1.	"My Man" (Charles, Pollack, Willemet)	3:41
2.	"If You Go Away" (Brel, McKuen)	4:27
3.	"What Now My Love" (Bécaud, Delanoë)	3:59
4.	"Un homme et une femme" (Barouh, Lai)	3:19
5.	"The Summer Knows" (Bergman, Bergman, Legrand)	3:54
6.	"I Wish You Love" (Beach, Trenet)	3:59
7.	"Yesterday, When I Was Young" (Aznavour, Kretzmer)	3:53
8.	"Les Moulins de mon cœur" (Bergman, Bergman, Legrand)	3:44
9.	"Les Feuilles mortes" (Kosma, Mercer, Prévert)	4:05
10.	"Where Do I Begin" (Lai, Sigman)	3:45
11.	"Syracuse" (Dimey, Salvador)	3:28
12.	"La Mer" (Lasry, Trenet)	3:50
13.	"And Now... Ladies and Gentlemen" (Bergman, Ives, Legrand)	4:12
14.	"If You Go Away" (remix) (Brel, McKuen)	3:18

== Charts ==
=== Weekly charts ===
Weekly chart performance for Piano Bar
Chart (2002–2003)	Peak position
Austrian Albums (Ö3 Austria)	38
Belgian Albums (Ultratop Wallonia)	6
European Albums (Music & Media)	23
French Albums (SNEP)	10
German Albums (Offizielle Top 100)	12
New Zealand Albums (RMNZ)	35
Swiss Albums (Schweizer Hitparade)	6

=== Year-end charts ===
Year-end chart performance for Piano Bar
Chart (2002)	Position
Belgian Albums (Ultratop Wallonia)	36
Belgian Francophone Albums (Ultratop Wallonia)	23
French Albums (SNEP)	60
Swiss Albums (Schweizer Hitparade)	60

== Certifications and sales ==
Region	Certification	Certified units/sales
France (SNEP)	Gold	100,000^{*}
Switzerland (IFPI Switzerland)	Gold	20,000^{^}
^{*} Sales figures based on certification alone.^{^} Shipments figures based on certification alone.
