= Le Mot de passe =

Studio album by Patricia Kaas
- Released: May 14, 1999
- Recorded: Suresnes, France; London, UK
- Genre: Pop
- Label: Sony Musique, Columbia

Patricia Kaas chronology
Rendez-vous (1998)	Le Mot de passe (1999)	Christmas in Vienna VI (1999)

Singles from Le Mot de passe
- 1. "Ma liberté contre la tienne" Released: April 1999; 2. "Une femme comme une autre" Released: August 1999

Le Mot de passe (Eng: The Password) is an album recorded by the French singer Patricia Kaas. It was her fifth successful studio album and was released in 1999. It was well charted in many countries, including France and Belgium.

== Background and writing ==
This album was released on May 14, 1999. As for Je te dis vous and Dans ma chair, it was composed and produced by many famous artists in France. For example, it was produced by the French singer and songwriter Pascal Obispo, on which Kaas was accompanied by an orchestra on several tracks. Jean-Jacques Goldman again contributed to the making of the studio album, among others writing two songs : "Une fille de l'Est" (Eng: "A Girl from the East") in which Kaas praised her East French heritage and "Les chansons commencent" (Goldman had already worked with Kaas for her two previous studio albums). The French singer Zazie wrote the track "J'attends de nous" (she had also participated in the writing of "Je compte jusqu'à toi", on Dans ma chair). Lionel Florence, who had composed many songs for many artists such as Nolwenn Leroy, was involved in the writing of three tracks. Yvan Cassar, Abraham Laboriel Jr. and Jean-Philippe Audin, who participated in Mylène Farmer's albums and concerts tours, were parts of musicians.

The song "Les Éternelles" (Eng: "The Eternals") was also published in Germany as a duet with the Swiss tenor Erkan Aki under the title of "Unter der Haut" (Eng: "Under the skin"), and was the theme music of the five-part ZDF serial Sturmzeit (Eng: Stormy Times), based on a book by Charlotte Link.

In France, the two singles from this album didn't meet a great success. The first one, "Ma liberté contre la tienne", peaked only at #34, while the second one, "Une femme comme une autre", failed to reach the top 50 (#78). Two other songs from Le Mot de passe were released as singles in 2000 ("Mon chercheur d'or" and "Les chansons commencent"), but in their live versions available on Kaas' 2000 album Live. They weren't successful too.

== Chart performance ==
Even if this album was successful, it didn't hit the same sales and chartings as Kaas' two previous studio albums. In France, it reached #2 on May 22, 1999, and stayed there for three consecutive weeks. After that, it almost kept on dropping, falling off the top ten after just six weeks. However, it managed to stabilize in the lower positions and totaled 27 weeks in the top 50 and 36 weeks in the top 100. It achieved Platinum status and was the 26th best-selling album of 1999.

In Belgium (Wallonia), the album had a great success : it debuted at #14 on May 29, then jumped to #7, finally hit #2 and remained at this position for three consecutive weeks. It dropped slowly and featured in the top ten for nine weeks, 18 weeks in the top 20 and 26 weeks in the top 40.

The album was charted for 15 weeks in Switzerland (top 50), eight of them in the top 30, with a peak at #14 in its second week, on June 6, 1999. The album was certified Gold disc the same year.

Le Mot de passe met a moderate success in Germany, where it peaked at #27, and Finland, where it hit #26 and stayed on the chart for four weeks.

== Track listing ==
#	Title	Length
1.	"Ma liberté contre la tienne" (D.Golemanas / P.Obispo)	5:47
2.	"Une fille de l'Est" (J.J.Goldman)	3:31
3.	"Si tu rêves" (D.Golemanas / P.Obispo)	3:50
4.	"J'attends de nous" (Zazie / P.Obispo)	4:52
5.	"Le Mot de passe" (D.Golemanas / P.Obispo)	4:12
6.	"Les Éternelles" (D.Golemanas / P.Obispo)	3:51
7.	"La Clé" (L.Florence / P.Obispo)	4:34
8.	"Mon chercheur d'or" (D.Golemanas / P.Obispo)	4:32
9.	"Quand je t'oublie" (D.Golemanas / P.Obispo - P.Jaconelli)	4:37
10.	"Une femme comme une autre" (L.Florence / P.Obispo)	4:44
11.	"Les chansons commencent" (J.J.Goldman)	5:30
12.	"Et je m'en veux" (L.Florence / P.Obispo)	3:56

== Credits ==
=== Musicians ===
- Strings arrangements : Yvan Cassar, except Yvan Cassar, Pascal Obispo (5-7)
- Keyboards, synths : Christophe Voisin, except Pascal Obispo (8)
- Organs : Jean Mora
- Piano : Yvan Cassar, except Pascal Obispo (8-9)
- Bass : Reggie Hamilton, except Laurent Vernerey (3-8-11)
- Acoustic guitars : Hugh Burns, Pascal Obispo, except Hugh Burns (1-9), Jean-Jacques Goldman (2)
- Guitar : Pierre Jaconelli
- Percussion : Denis Benarrosh
- Drum kit : Abe Laboriel Jr., except Christophe Deschamps (3-8-11)
- Background vocals : Pascal Obispo, except Sweetness (9), Pascal Obispo, Patricia (3), Chorale Improvisation, Pascal Obispo, Jean-Jacques Goldman (11)
- Strings directed by Yvan Cassar
- First violin : Christophe Guiot
- Violins : Véronique Marcel, Marie-Paule Vieille, Thibault Vieux, Laurent Philipp, Élisabeth Pallas, Michèle Deschamps, Patrice Mondon, Alain Kouznetzoff, Yves Melon, Marie-Hélène Beridot, Jeanne Lancien, Christophe Bruckert, Arnaud Nuvolone, Alain Persiaux, Éric Lacrouts, Véronique Guay, Mathilde Pasquier, Thierry Huchin, François Harmelle, David Gabel, Alexandre Pelovsky, Fanny Rome, Gilles Donge, Pierre Rogue, Marie-Hélène Clausse, Lionel Turchi, Céline Plane, Cyril Ghestem, Marianne Lagarde, Lyonel Schmit, Béatrice Lormand
- Altos : François Gneri, Jonathan Naze, Diederik Suys, Jean-Charles Monciero, Olivier Grimoin, Petia Bruckert, Fabrice Leroux, Étienne Julien Tavitian, Alexis Rojanski, Vincent Aucante, Antoine Di Pietro, Christian Lormand, Agnès Toussaint, Cyrille Mercier
- Cellos : Jean-Philippe Audin, Philippe Nadal, Philippe Cherond, Cyrille Lacrouts, Michel Lacrouts, Mathieu Rogue, Philippe Feret, Nathalie Gaudemer, Frédéric Lagarde, Béatrice Toussaint
- Double basses : Philippe Noharet, Jean-Pascal Beintus, Stéphane Logerot, Axel Salles, Ludovic Dutriez, Michel Peyratout, Sandrine Vautrin, Catherine Robin, Sylvain Le Provost, Rémy Bouchy
- Flute : Frédéric Chatoux
- Oboe : François-Xavier Bourin
- Clarinets : Philippe Berraud, Jérôme Verharghe
- Bassoon : Jean-François Duquesnoy
- Horns : Jean-Michel Tavernier, Hervé Joulain, Jacques Peillon

=== Recording and production ===
- Produced by Pascal Obispo
- Engineer, mixing : Thierry Rogen
- Assistants : Nicolas Duport, Étienne Colin, Frédéric Perrinet, Xavier Poisonnière
- Chargé of production : Marion Morel Derocle
- Artistic coordination : Michel Boulanger
- Recorded and mixed at Studio Méga (Suresnes, France)
- Mastering : Tony Cousin at Metropolis (London)
- Photos : Christine Fuhrmann, Ken Browar, Roland Allard
- Make up : Charlotte Willer
- Hairdresser : Romain Sorin, Barnabé, Stéphane Pous
- Design : FKGB
- Management : Talent Sorcier (Cyril Prieur, Richard Walter), Paris, France
- Editions: Sony / ATV Music Publishing
- Programming : Ivan Inverd, except Pascal Obispo, Christophe Voisin (3)

== Charts ==
=== Weekly charts ===
Weekly chart performance for Le mot de passe
Chart (1999–2000)	Peak position
Belgian Albums (Ultratop Wallonia)	2
European Albums (Music & Media)	15
Finnish Albums (Suomen virallinen lista)	26
French Albums (SNEP)	2
German Albums (Offizielle Top 100)	27
Swiss Albums (Schweizer Hitparade)	14

=== Year-end charts ===
Year-end chart performance for Le mot de passe
Chart (1999)	Position
Belgian Albums (Ultratop Wallonia)	23
Belgian Francophone Albums (Ultratop Wallonia)	15
French Albums (SNEP)	26

== Certifications and sales ==
Region	Certification	Certified units/sales
Belgium (BRMA)	Gold	25,000^{*}
France (SNEP)	Platinum	300,000^{*}
Switzerland (IFPI Switzerland)	Gold	25,000^{^}
^{*} Sales figures based on certification alone.^{^} Shipments figures based on certification alone.
