= Mademoiselle chante le blues =

Single by Patricia Kaas

from the album Mademoiselle chante...
- B-side: "Patricia voudrait bien"
- Released: November 1987
- Recorded: 1987; Studio CBE, Paris
- Genre: Pop
- Length: 3:48
- Label: Polydor, PolyGram
- Songwriters: Didier Barbelivien, Bob Mehdi
- Producer: Joël Cartigny

Patricia Kaas singles chronology
"Jalouse" (1985)	"Mademoiselle chante le blues" (1987)	"D'Allemagne" (1988)

"Mademoiselle chante le blues" (Eng: "Mademoiselle Sings the Blues", possibly referring to the Billie Holiday song "Lady Sings the Blues") is the name of a 1987 song recorded by the French singer Patricia Kaas. It was her first single from her debut studio album, Mademoiselle chante..., on which it features as ninth track, and her second single overall. Released in November 1987, it was Kaas' first hit, reaching the top ten in France. It remains one of the most emblematic songs of the singer.

== Background ==
After the failure of her first single "Jalouse", written by Élisabeth Depardieu and released in 1985, Kaas decided to collaborate with songwriter Didier Barbelivien who composed for her ten of the eleven tracks of her debut album, Mademoiselle chante..., including "Mademoiselle chante le blues", which was co-written (lyrics) with Bob Mehdi. According to a specialist of French charts, "Mademoiselle chante le blues" is a song that is so representative of its performer that "we cannot manage to separate them, nor to imagine anyone else for singing it".

== Live performances ==
"Mademoiselle chante le blues" was performed during Kaas' concert tours in 1991, 1994, 1998 and 2005, and was thus included on the live albums Carnets de scène, Tour de charme in an extended edit version, Rendez-vous and Toute la musique... and also on the singer's best of Rien ne s'arrête in a live version and Ma Liberté contre la tienne.

== Chart performance ==
With "Mademoiselle chante le blues", Kaas appeared for the first time on the French charts. It debuted at number 29 on 28 November 1987, then climbed and entered the top ten in its eighth week, peaking at number seven on 30 January and 13 February 1988. It remained in the top ten for five consecutive weeks, then almost did not stop to drop on the chart (top 50) and fell off after 18 weeks. It was certified Silver disc by the Syndicat National de l'Édition Phonographique. On the European Hot 100 Singles, it started at number 84 on 12 December 1987, reached a peak of number 24 in its 12th week, and cumulated 15 weeks of presence on the chart.

== Track listings ==
- CD single
1. "Mademoiselle chante le blues" — 3:46
2. "Patricia voudrait bien" — 3:35
- CD maxi
1. "Mademoiselle chante le blues" — 3:46
2. "Patricia voudrait bien" — 3:35
3. "Mademoiselle chante le blues" (long version)
- 7" single
1. "Mademoiselle chante le blues" — 3:46
2. "Patricia voudrait bien" — 3:35
- Cassette
1. "Mademoiselle chante le blues" — 3:46
2. "Patricia voudrait bien" — 3:35
- 12" maxi
1. "Mademoiselle chante le blues" — 3:46
2. "Patricia voudrait bien" — 3:35
3. "Mademoiselle chante le blues" (long version)
- Digital download
1. "Mademoiselle chante le blues" — 3:46
2. "Mademoiselle chante le blues" (1991 live version) — 7:58
3. "Mademoiselle chante le blues" (edit) — 11:22
4. "Mademoiselle chante le blues" (1998 live version) — 5:23
5. "Mademoiselle chante le blues" (2005 live version) — 6:26

== Credits ==
- Joël Cartigny - producer for Bernard Schwartz
- Dominique Dubois - photography
- Bernard Estardy - arranger
- Huart/Cholley - design

== Charts and certifications ==
=== Weekly charts ===
Weekly chart performance for "Mademoiselle chante le blues"
Chart (1987–1988)	Peak position
Belgium (Ultratop 50 Flanders)	34
Europe (European Hot 100)	24
France (SNEP)	7
Quebec (ADISQ)	6

=== Certifications ===
Certifications for "Mademoiselle chante le blues"
Region	Certification	Certified units/sales
France (SNEP)	Silver	200,000^{*}
^{*} Sales figures based on certification alone.
