= Dans ma chair =

Studio album by Patricia Kaas
- Released: March 17, 1997
- Recorded: New York, U.S.
- Genre: Chanson
- Length: 53:59
- Label: Sony Musique, Columbia

Patricia Kaas chronology
Café noir (1996)	Dans ma chair (1997)	Rendez-vous (1998)

Singles from Dans ma chair
- 1. "Quand j'ai peur de tout" Released: February 1997; 2. "Je voudrais la connaître" Released: July 1997; 3. "Les lignes de nos mains" Released: 1997; 4. "Je me souviens de rien" Released: 1998

Dans ma chair (Eng (approx.): In My Flesh) is an album recorded by the French singer Patricia Kaas. It was released in 1997 and achieved success in many countries.

== Background and writing ==
After the success of the previous studio album, Je te dis vous, Kaas decided to release a new album in 1997, which was entitled Dans ma chair. The album marked the second collaboration with the French songwriter and singer Jean-Jacques Goldman who had already written her 1993 hit single "Il me dit que je suis belle". To date, Kaas continues to be associated with Goldman for the composing of her songs, and this collaboration remains one of the most important of the singer's career. The album was recorded in New York, but also in Paris, and produced by the singer and Phil Ramone, who had previously worked with artists such as Ray Charles, Billy Joel and Paul Simon.

The album was also composed by several famous contributors : for example, the American songwriter and singer Lyle Lovett, with the song "Chanson simple" (Eng: "Simple song"), and James Taylor with "Don't Let Me Be Lonely Tonight" (the song, the last track, is performed as a duet). French artists participated in the writing of the album, such as Didier Barbelivien, who had also worked with Kaas for her previous studio album, and Zazie. Philippe Bergman, who co-wrote three songs of this album, was Kaas' boyfriend at the time.

In France, two singles were released from this album : "Quand j'ai peur de tout" (Eng: "When I'm afraid of everything") in February 1997, which reached #11 and achieved Silver status, and "Je voudrais la connaître" (Eng: "I Want to Know Her") in July 1997, which peaked at #20. The first single, "Quand j'ai peur de tout", was written by Diane Warren and was successfully covered in English-language in 2003 by the pop band Sugababes, but the song was re-entitled "Too Lost in You".

== Chart performance ==
In France, the album remained on the chart for 57 weeks. It started at #2 on March 22, 1997, and reached again this position two weeks later, but its sales were less than Andrea Bocelli's extremely successful album Romanza, which topped the chart then. Kaas' album remained for only nine weeks in the top ten, but dropped slowly on the chart. It was certified Platinum by the SNEP and the tenth best-selling album of 1997 in the country.

The album was a smash success in Belgium (Wallonia) : it went to #2 on April 5, 1997, then climbed to #1 and stayed there for four not consecutive weeks. It totaled 27 weeks in the top ten and remained on the chart for 61 weeks. It fell off it after the chart edition of July 11, 1998.

In Switzerland, the album reached number 5 in its first and second weeks, and remained on the chart for 20 weeks, from March 30 to August 31, 1997, including five weeks in the top ten. It hit Gold certification in 1997.

In Finland, Dans ma chair was charted from the early 1997 and peaked at #8 in its third week, after a debut at #12. It featured for 17 weeks in the top 40.

In other countries, the album was less successful even if it met slightly good sales, peaking at #16 in Germany, #27 in Belgium (Flanders) (it remained on the chart for eight weeks, from April 12 to June 14, 1997), #45 in Austria where it was charted for three weeks and #77 in the Netherlands where it appeared for five weeks.

== Track listing ==
No.	Title	Writer(s)	Producer(s)	Length
1.	"Quand j'ai peur de tout"	Diane Warren; Jean-Jacques Goldman	Phil Ramone; Patricia Kaas	4:20
2.	"Dans ma chair"	Shelly Peiken; C. J. Vanston; Tim Pierce; Jean Fauque	Ramone; Kaas	4:34
3.	"Chanson simple"	Lyle Lovett; Philippe Bergman	Ramone; Kaas	3:22
4.	"J'ai tout quitté pour toi"	Mike Leeson; Bergman; Peter Vale	Ramone; Kaas	3:50
5.	"Je me souviens de rien"	Sally Dworsky; Brenda Russell; Rich Wayland; Goldman	Ramone; Kaas	4:05
6.	"Les Lignes de nos mains"	Anne Preven; Enrique Andreu; Scott Cutler	Ramone; Kaas	4:15
7.	"Je sais"	Didier Barbelivien; François Bernheim	Ramone; Kaas	3:10
8.	"Je voudrais la connaître"	Goldman	Goldman	4:16
9.	"Fais-moi l'amitié"	Franck Langolff; Françis Basset	Langolff	4:30
10.	"L'Amour devant la mer"	Joelle Kopf; Michel Amsellem	Ramone; Kaas	3:37
11.	"Je compte jusqu'à toi"	Robyn Smith; Zazie; Barry Blue	Ramone; Kaas	5:05
12.	"Sans toi"	Warren; Bergman	Guy Roche; Kaas	4:01
13.	"Don't Let Me Be Lonely Tonight" (duet with James Taylor)	Taylor	Ramone; Kaas	4:54
14.	"When the Night Rolls In" (Japanese bonus track)	Dworsky; Russell; Wayland	Ramone; Kaas	4:05

== Credits ==
- Engineers : Frank Filipetti
- Additional engineers : John Patterson, Richard Alderson, Billy Sherrill, C.J. Vanston, Richard Whaley, Bruno Lambert, Jean-Pierre Janiaud, Cyril Labesse, Eric Schilling, Thierry Blanchard, Mario Luccy, Moana Suchard
- Assistants : Joe Lizzi, John Wydrycs, Brian Vibberts, Graham Smith, Pascal Colomb, Olivier, Jérôme Kerner
- Executive producer : Jill Dell' Abate
- Recording : Right Track Studios, Sony Studios, Flying Monkey Studio (New York), Studio Plus XXX, Studio Hauts de Gamme, Studio Gang (Paris), Music Hill (Nashville, TN), Studio Quazar (Rouen), The Treehouse (North Hollywood, CA), Deep River Studio (Cookham, UK), Banana Boat Studios (Burbank, CA)
- Mixing : Right Track Studios and Chung King Studios (New York), Studio Gang (Paris)
- Mastering : Ted Jensen at Sterling Sound (New York)
- Photo : Pablo Ravazzani
- Design : Huart / Cholley
- Make up : Key Montano
- Hairdresser : Thomas McKiver
- Dress designer : Victoria Bartlett, Pascal Gosset
- Management : Talent Sorcier (Cyril Prieur, Richard Walter), Paris, France

== Charts ==
=== Weekly charts ===
Weekly chart performance for Dans ma chair
Chart (1997–1998)	Peak position
Austrian Albums (Ö3 Austria)	45
Belgian Albums (Ultratop Flanders)	27
Belgian Albums (Ultratop Wallonia)	1
Dutch Albums (Album Top 100)	77
European Albums (Music & Media)	11
Finnish Albums (Suomen virallinen lista)	8
French Albums (SNEP)	2
German Albums (Offizielle Top 100)	16
Swiss Albums (Schweizer Hitparade)	5

=== Year-end charts ===
1997 year-end chart performance for Dans ma chair
Chart (1997)	Position
Belgian Albums (Ultratop Wallonia)	9
European Albums (Music & Media)	60
French Albums (SNEP)	10
Swiss Albums (Schweizer Hitparade)	44

1998 year-end chart performance for Dans ma chair
Chart (1998)	Position
Belgian Albums (Ultratop Wallonia)	66

== Certifications and sales ==
Region	Certification	Certified units/sales
Belgium (BRMA)	Platinum	50,000^{*}
Finland (Musiikkituottajat)	Gold	22,751
France (SNEP)	2× Platinum	600,000^{*}
Switzerland (IFPI Switzerland)	Platinum	50,000^{^}
Summaries
Europe (IFPI)	Platinum	1,000,000^{*}
^{*} Sales figures based on certification alone.^{^} Shipments figures based on certification alone.
