= Il me dit que je suis belle =

Single by Patricia Kaas

from the album Je te dis vous
- B-side: "It's a Man's World"
- Released: July 1993
- Recorded: 1993 London (song); Miami (video)
- Genre: Pop
- Length: 5:21 (album version); 4:44 (single version)
- Label: Sony BMG, Columbia
- Songwriter: Jean-Jacques Goldman
- Producer: Robin Millar

Patricia Kaas singles chronology
| "Ceux qui n'ont rien" (1993) | "Il me dit que je suis belle" (1993) | "Hôtel Normandy" (1993) |

Alternative cover
- Japan release

"Il me dit que je suis belle" is a 1993 song recorded by the French singer Patricia Kaas. It was her second single from her third studio album, Je te dis vous, on which it features as fifth track, and her 12th single overall. Released in July 1993, it was a top five hit in France, becoming Kaas' most successful single in terms of time on the chart and peak position. It remains one of her most popular songs.

== Background and release ==
The lyrics were written and the music composed by famous singer-songwriter Jean-Jacques Goldman under the pseudonym of Sam Brewski.

Patricia Kaas explained that the recording of the song was an important moment in her career, because she had then the feeling of "already passing from the teenager to the woman", and she felt better in herself. For his part, Goldman said he had written this song for Kaas because he considered she was "credible" in the words she sang.

== Lyrics, music and video ==
The text deals about a perfect love dreamt by the narrator. In the song, Patricia Kaas sings "the refuge of the dreamlike and the gap with the reality. The verses depict the tragic of the dissatisfied daily life, the refrain brings the desired love and declines it with tenderness, romance and cliches." However, this dream is eventually cruel because it does not materialize.

There are two studio versions of the song : the first is the album version, the more acoustic, and the second is the single version, which is used in the music video. It was shot on a beach in Miami, Florida, and shows Kaas clasping a man portraying her boyfriend on the beach, while some men are watching them quietly in the background.

== Live performances and covers ==
The song was performed during Kaas' concert tours in 1994, 1998 and 2005, and was thus included on the live albums Tour de charme, Rendez-vous and Toute la musique... and also on the singer's best of Rien ne s'arrête (single version) and Ma Liberté contre la tienne.

"Il me dit que je suis belle" was covered in 1997 by Jeane Manson for the 1993 covers compilation Les plus belles chansons françaises. It was later covered by Liane Foly, Natasha St-Pier, Julie Zenatti and Jenifer Bartoli for Les Enfoirés's 2003 album La Foire aux Enfoirés (CD 1, 11th track, 4:20).

== Chart performances ==
The song had a long chart trajectory in France. It entered the chart at number 39 on 10 July 1993. Then it fell off the top 50 but re-entered it the week after at number 50. It alternately climbed and dropped almost each week, and finally reached the top ten in its ninth week. It peaked at number five in its 18th and dropped slowly, remaining in the top ten for eight weeks, in the top 20 for 19 weeks and in the top 50 for 32 weeks. It achieved Silver status awarded by the SNEP.

"Il me dit que je suis belle" was also much aired on radio and was successfully exported in countries such as Japan, where it was released. It was also charted in Germany, peaking at number 80 in December 1993.

== Track listings ==
- CD single
1. "Il me dit que je suis belle" (new version) – 4:44
2. "It's a Man's World" (album version) – 5:43
- CD maxi
1. "Il me dit que je suis belle" (radio edit / new version) – 4:01
2. "It's a Man's World" (album version) – 5:44
3. "Il me dit que je suis belle" (new version) – 4:42
- Cassette
1. "Il me dit que je suis belle" (new version) – 4:44
2. "It's a Man's World" (album version) – 5:43
- 12" maxi
1. "Il me dit que je suis belle" (new version) – 4:44
- CD maxi – Japan
1. "Il me dit que je suis belle" (radio edit / new version) – 4:01
2. "It's a Man's World" (album version) – 5:44
3. "Il me dit que je suis belle" – 4:42
- Digital download
1. "Il me dit que je suis belle" (album version) – 5:21
2. "Il me dit que je suis belle" (1994 live version) – 6:31
3. "Il me dit que je suis belle" (1998 live version) – 7:03
4. "Il me dit que je suis belle" (2005 live version) – 4:51

== Charts ==
Weekly chart performance for "Il me dit que je suis belle"
| Chart (1993–1994) | Peak position |
|---|---|
| French SNEP Singles Chart | 5 |
| Quebec (ADISQ) | 6 |
| German Singles Chart | 80 |

== Certifications ==
Certifications for "Il me dit que je suis belle"
| Region | Certification | Certified units/sales |
|---|---|---|
| France (SNEP) | Silver | 125,000^{*} |
^{*} Sales figures based on certification alone.
