= Je te dis vous =

Studio album by Patricia Kaas
- Released: 6 April 1993
- Recorded: London, UK
- Studio: Eel Pie (London)
- Genres: Pop, rock
- Labels: Sony Musique, Columbia
- Producer: Robin Millar

Patricia Kaas chronology
Carnets de scène (1991)	Je te dis vous (1993)	Tour de charme (1994)

Singles from Je te dis vous
- 1. "Entrer dans la lumière" Released: March 1993; 2. "Il me dit que je suis belle" Released: July 1993

Je te dis vous is an album recorded by the French singer Patricia Kaas. It was released in 1993 and achieved success in many countries.

== Background and writing ==
The name of the album is ironic in the French language because it uses both the familiar (te) and formal (vous) second-person pronouns. By using both the familiar and formal in the same short declaration, it shows a tension in the speaker's voice between the admiration of one that she respects formally, and someone that she dearly loves on a familiar level.

The album was produced in Pete Townshend's Eel Pie Studios in London, England by Robin Millar, who had already worked for Sade and the Fine Young Cannibals. In the U.S. and United Kingdom it appeared under the name of Tour de charme (not to be confused with the live album of the same name).

The songs "Je te dis vous", "Je retiens mon souffle" and "Fatiguée d'attendre" were not written by Kaas, but were based on an idea of her, as indicated in the album's booklet.

On the album Kaas sang her first song in German: the song "Ganz und gar" (Eng: "Absolutely") came from the pen of the German singer and songwriter Marius Müller-Westernhagen. The album also featured three tracks in English, including a cover of the James Brown number "It's a Man's World". The British rock musician Chris Rea accompanied Kaas on the tracks "Out of the Rain" and "Ceux qui n'ont rien" (Eng: "Those who have nothing") on guitar.

The album was supported by a tour in 1994 and recorded in a live version on the 1995 album Tour de charme.

In France, there were two successful singles from this album : "Entrer dans la lumière" (Eng: "Come into the light"), written by Didier Barbelivien, and "Il me dit que je suis belle" (Eng: "He tells me I'm beautiful"), composed by Jean-Jacques Goldman under the pseudonym of Sam Brewski. With the latter, Kaas achieved her second top five single in France. A remix of "Reste sur moi" (Eng: "Stay on me"), a song composed by Marc Lavoine, reached the top 20 of the U.S. dance charts.

This LP was released as Tour de Charme (not to be mistaken with her second live album) in the USA (on 17 August 1993) and the United-Kingdom, and shows a slightly different track-listing:

- Hôtel Normandy was dropped and replaced by a previously unreleased track: A Saint-Lunaire.
- Track 10 is a rendering of La Vie en Rose
- Ganz und Gar and Out of the Rain were dropped from this version.

== Critical reception and chart performance ==
This album marked the definitive breakthrough of the singer in the international music scene, selling three million copies in 47 countries. Currently Je te dis vous is considered one of the best albums of modern chanson, displaying the key qualities of the genre.

Je te dis vous is currently Kaas' most successful album in the German-speaking world, only just missing out on the German top 10 (it spent two weeks at 11th place), but spending 36 weeks in the top 100.

In Switzerland, Kaas's album featured on the chart (Top 40) for 25 weeks, from 18 April to 3 October 1993. It debuted at #10 and climbed to #2 two weeks later. It remained for two consecutive weeks at this position, but was unable to dislodge Aerosmith's album Get a Grip. It appeared for 14 weeks in the top ten, then dropped slowly on the chart and finally achieved double platinum status. It was the ninth best-selling album of 1993.

In France, the album was charted for many months, from 15 April 1993 to 8 January 1995. It went straight to #1 and stayed there for five weeks. It totaled about 40 weeks in the top ten. It was her third album to go Diamond, 11 months after its appearance.

The album had moderate success in the Netherlands. It featured for five weeks on the albums chart and went to #98 on 24 July 1993, reaching its peak position, #83, two weeks later.

== Track listing ==
#	Title	Length
1.	"Y'avait tant d'étoiles" (J.Kopf / M.Amsellem)	1:54
2.	"Hôtel Normandy" (D.Barbelivien / F.Bernheim)	5:34
3.	"Je retiens mon souffle" (M.Lavoine - P.Grillet / F.Aboulker)	4:37
4.	"Ceux qui n'ont rien" (D.Barbelivien - F.Bernheim / D.Barbelivien)	5:16
5.	"Il me dit que je suis belle" (album version) (S.Brewski)	5:21
6.	"Space in My Heart" (D.Austin / M.Elliot)	4:51
7.	"La Liberté" (M.Lavoine / F.Aboulker)	4:04
8.	"Fatiguée d'attendre" (J.Kopf / M.Amsellem)	4:31
9.	"Jojo" (D.Barbelivien / F.Bernheim)	3:20
10.	"Je te dis vous" (J.Kopf / M.Amsellem)	3:43
11.	"Reste sur moi" (M.Lavoine / F.Aboulker)	4:34
12.	"Ganz und gar" (M.M.Westernhagen)	4:47
13.	"Out of the Rain" (T.J.White)	4:34
14.	"It's a Man's World" (J.Brown / B.Newsome)	5:45
15.	"Entrer dans la lumière" (D.Barbelivien / F.Bernheim)	4:05
16.	"Juste une chanson" (Bonus track for Japanese edition) (J.Kopf / M. Nakajima)	6:01

== Credits ==
=== Editions ===
- Note de Blues (tracks 1, 8, 10)
- Pole Music / Good Good Music (tracks 2, 4, 9, 15)
- Note de Blues / Les Amours du Dimanche (tracks 3, 7, 11)
- JRG / Note de Blues (track 5)
- EMI Music Publishing (tracks 6, 13)
- Intersong Music (track 14)
- More Music / Kick Music GMBH / Note de Blues (track 12)

=== Musicians ===
- Jess Bailey - piano, organ, synth, programming
- Mark Smith - bass
- Jeremy Stacey - drums
- Paul Stacey - electric and acoustic guitar
- Martin Ditcham - percussion
- Martin Green - saxophone
- Steve Sidwell - trumpet
- Mall Coleman - trombone
- Bobby Valentino - violin
- Gavyn Wright - alto violin
- Roger Smith, Paul Kegg - cello
- Carole Rowley, Mick Feat, Guida de Palma, Patricia Kaas (on "It's a Man World" only) - backing vocals

=== Recording ===
- Arrangements : Robin Millar for Denis Muirhead Management, London
- Sound and mixing : Jock Loveband
- Sound : Bruno Lambert
- Assistants : Paul Rowan Stevens, Bruce Robins
- Conductor : Jess Bailey
- Recording : EEL PIE Studios, Twickenham, UK
- Mixing : EEL PIE Studios & Metropolis, London
- Strings arrangements : Robin Millar transcribed and directed by James Shearman
- Brass instruments arrangements : Robin Millar transcribed and directed by Martin Green
- Engraving : Tim Young at Sony Hit Factory, London; Bruno Lambert and André Perillat at Top Master, Paris
- Photo : Greg Gorman
- Cover design : Antonietti, Pascault et Ass.
- Make up : Emmanuel Sammartino

== Charts ==
=== Weekly charts ===
Weekly chart performance for Je te dis vous
Chart (1993–1994)	Peak position
Belgian Albums (SABAM/IFPI)	1
Dutch Albums (Album Top 100)	83
European Albums (Music & Media)	10
Finnish Albums (Suomen virallinen lista)	8
French Albums (SNEP)	1
German Albums (Offizielle Top 100)	11
Swiss Albums (Schweizer Hitparade)	2

=== Year-end charts ===
1993 year-end chart performance for Je te dis vous
Chart (1993)	Position
European Albums (Music & Media)	28
French Albums (SNEP)	3
German Albums (Offizielle Top 100)	42
Swiss Albums (Schweizer Hitparade)	9

1994 year-end chart performance for Je te dis vous
Chart (1994)	Position
French Albums (SNEP)	29

== Certifications and sales ==
Region	Certification	Certified units/sales
Canada (Music Canada)	Gold	50,000^{^}
Finland (Musiikkituottajat)	Platinum	44,918
France (SNEP)	Diamond	1,000,000^{*}
Germany (BVMI)	Gold	250,000^{^}
Switzerland (IFPI Switzerland)	2× Platinum	100,000^{^}
Summaries
Worldwide	—	2,000,000
^{*} Sales figures based on certification alone.^{^} Shipments figures based on certification alone.
