= Patricia Kaas =

French singer (born 1966)

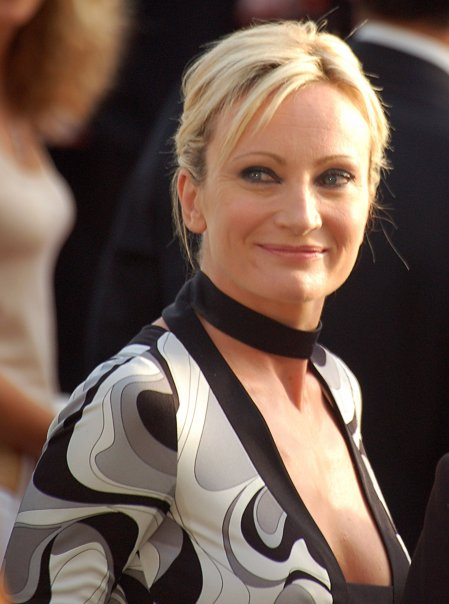
- Patricia Kaas at the Cannes festival, 2007

Background information
- Born: Patricia Noëlle Kaas; 5 December 1966 (age 59); Forbach, Lorraine, France
- Genres: Chanson, Cabaret, Jazz, Pop, Rock
- Occupation: Singer
- Years active: 1985–2017 • 2024–present
- Labels: Polydor, CBS
- Website: www.patriciakaas.net

Patricia Noëlle Kaas (French: [kas]; born 5 December 1966) is a French singer. Her music is a mix of pop, cabaret, jazz, and chanson.

Since the appearance of her 1988 debut album Mademoiselle chante..., Kaas won 6 Victoires de la Musique awards and has sold over 20 million records worldwide. She had her greatest success in Germany, Switzerland, Belgium, Canada, Russia, Finland, Ukraine, and South Korea with her third album Je te dis vous. In 2002, Kaas made her film debut in And Now... Ladies and Gentlemen with Jeremy Irons. She represented France in the Eurovision Song Contest 2009 in Moscow and finished in eighth place.

== Career ==
=== 1966–1984: Early life ===
Patricia Noëlle Kaas, the youngest of her family, was born on 5 December 1966 in Forbach, Lorraine, France, near the German border. Her father, Joseph Kaas (1927–1996), a miner, was a French Germanophone, and her mother, Irmgard (née Thiel; 1930–1989), was a German from Saar. Kaas grew up in Stiring-Wendel, between Forbach and Saarbrücken on the French side of the border. Until the age of six, she spoke only Lorraine Franconian. Her mother encouraged Kaas, then a young girl, to become a singer. At the age of only eight Kaas was already singing songs by Sylvie Vartan, Dalida, Claude François and Mireille Mathieu, as well as English-language songs such as "New York, New York", at various small events such as the marriage of her brother. Her first real success came when she received first place at a pop song contest.

Kaas took her first step into the professional music business at the age of 13, when, with the help of her brother Egon, she signed a contract with the Saarbrücken club Rumpelkammer. Kaas took the name Pady Pax — after Pax Majorettes, a brass band from Stiring-Wendel, of which she and her sister Carine were members — and for seven years appeared with the band, Dob's Lady Killers. At 16, she took a placement with a model agency in Metz. Her first attempts to break into the music business failed; a producer rejected her on the ground that the world did not need a second Mireille Mathieu. Kaas's producer at this time was the architect Bernard Schwartz.

=== 1985–1986: Jalouse and The Beginnings ===
In 1985, at 19 years old, Kaas was sponsored by French actor Gérard Depardieu. Schwartz had seen her singing at the Rumpelkammer in Saarbrücken and introduced her to the songwriter François Bernheim. Bernheim worked with her and convinced Depardieu to produce her music.

Depardieu produced Kaas's first single Jalouse (Eng: Jealous), written by Bernheim and Depardieu's wife, Élisabeth. The single was published by EMI, but was a flop. Nonetheless, her encounter with Depardieu was one of the most important events at the beginning of Kaas's artistic career.

=== 1987–1989: Mademoiselle chante le blues ===
Through Jalouse and Bernheim, the French songwriter Didier Barbelivien became aware of Kaas. His song Mademoiselle chante le blues (Eng: Lady sings the blues) was the singer's first big hit. The single was published in 1987 by Polydor, and reached 7th place in the French singles chart. The next year, Kaas's second single D'Allemagne (Eng: From Germany) was recorded, written by Barbelivien and Bernheim.

Shortly afterwards, Kaas's first album Mademoiselle chante... was produced. It reached 2nd place in the French album charts and stayed there for two months, remaining in the Top 10 for 64 weeks and 118 weeks in the top 100. Shortly after its appearance the album went gold in France (over 100,000 sold) and after three months it went platinum (over 350,000 sold). The album also went platinum in Belgium and Switzerland, and gold in Canada. In the same year, Kaas won Victoires de la Musique in the category of "Discovery of the Year", one of the most significant French music awards.

In 1989, "Mon mec à moi" was voted "La chanson française" by radio listeners across France, Belgium, Switzerland, and Canada, highlighting its widespread appeal in the Francophone world. The same year, Kaas suffered a traumatic personal experience, when her mother fell ill from cancer and died. The teddy bear Kaas sent to support her mother's convalescence today accompanies her everywhere as a mascot.

=== 1990–1992: Scène de vie ===
In 1990, Kaas began her first world tour, which lasted 16 months in total. She sang in front of about 750,000 fans in over 196 concerts in 12 countries. Among others, Kaas sang daily for a week at the Olympia and Zenith, one of the most famous concert halls in Paris. The concerts were sold out four months before they began. Kaas also gave other successful concerts in New York and Washington D.C. in the U.S.A. At the end of the tour, Mademoiselle chante... had sold 1 million copies in France alone, achieving diamond status. Kaas received the Goldene Europa, one of the biggest German music awards.

In 1990, Kaas moved from her former record company, Polydor, to CBS/Sony. Cyril Prieur and Richard Walter, of the Paris firm Talent Sorcier, replaced Bernard Schwartz to become her managers in 1987. Prieur and Walter contributed significantly to the singer's success, in return for which Kaas referred to them as her "family".

With a new record company, she produced Scène de vie (Eng: The Stage of Life) in 1990. It reached the top of the French charts and stayed there for 10 weeks, going diamond in the process as Mademoiselle chante... had done before it. With the song Kennedy Rose, Kaas again worked with Elisabeth Depardieu and François Bernheim. This collaboration was more successful than Jalouse, reaching 34th place in the French singles charts. The song was dedicated to Rose Kennedy, matriarch of the Kennedy clan, and mother of former U.S. president John F. Kennedy.

While on the Scène de vie tour, the singer performed 210 concerts before 650,000 spectators in 13 countries, among them Japan, Canada and the USSR, where she sang in Moscow and Leningrad. At the end of 1991, her first live album Carnets de scène (Eng: Stage Notebooks) appeared, which achieved popularity beyond her dedicated fans. 13 years later, Sony also published the album as a live DVD.

In 1991, Kaas received two further awards, the World Music Award and a Bambi. In the following year, she received 3rd place in the category of 'Best International Female Singer' at the ECHO awards in Cologne, nominated alongside Cher (who received first place), Tina Turner, Madonna and Whitney Houston, four of the biggest names in the music business.

During her Scène de vie tour, Patricia Kaas received critical acclaim for her ability to revitalize the classic French music-hall tradition. A review in The New York Times described her as a "charismatic young performer" who effectively reinvented the legacy of Edith Piaf and Charles Aznavour in a contemporary, yet respectful manner. The review noted that despite performing primarily in French, Kaas's strong theatrical presence and sharp, cutting alto allowed her to connect with American audiences, showcasing her international appeal.

=== 1993–1994: Je te dis vous ===
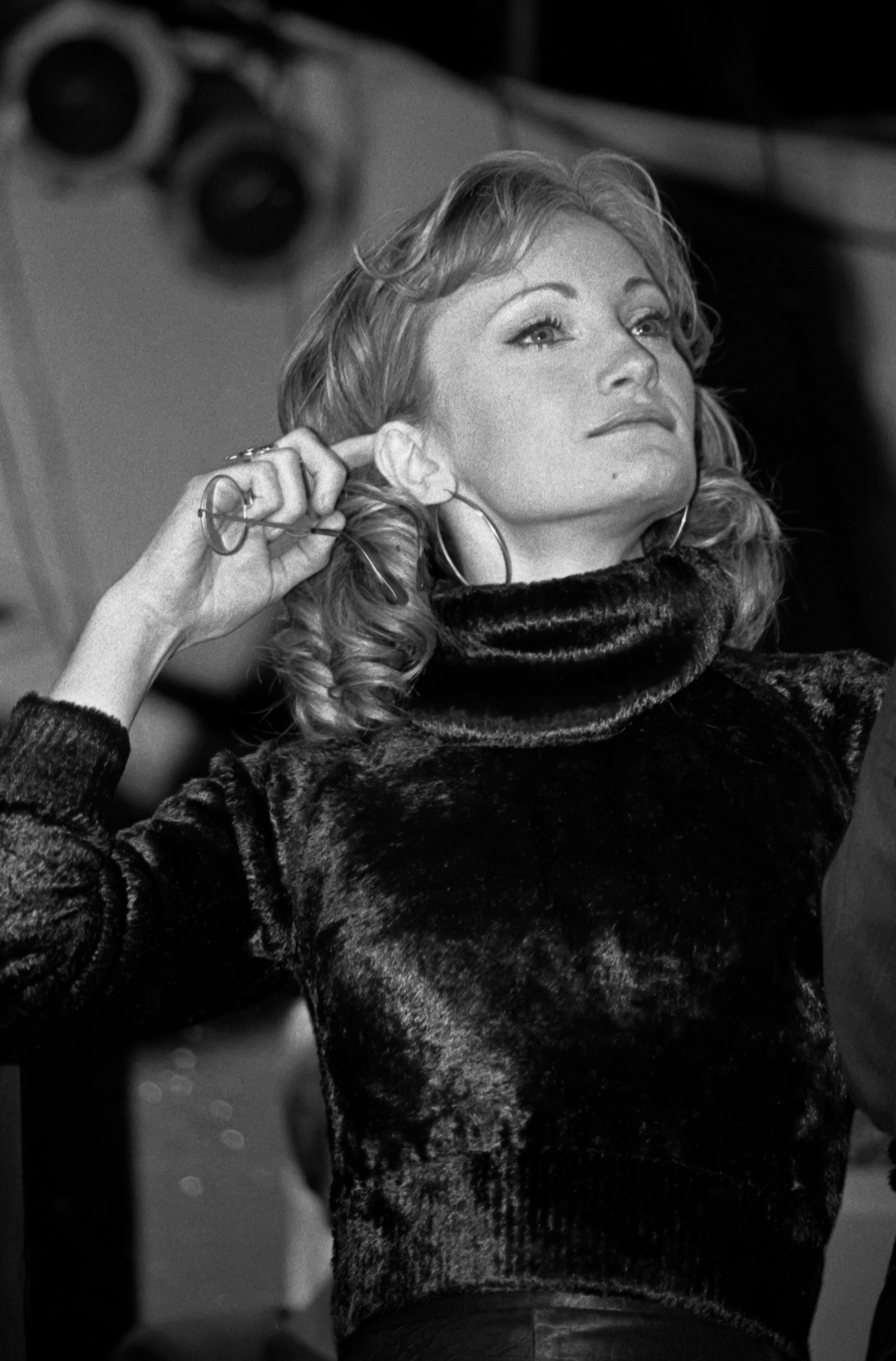
Patricia Kaas in Moscow, 1994

Kaas's 1993 album Je te dis vous (Eng.: I'm addressing you formally) was her definitive breakthrough in the international music scene, selling 3 million copies in 47 countries. It was produced in Pete Townshend's Eel Pie Studio in London, England by Robin Millar, who had already worked for Sade and the Fine Young Cannibals. In the U.S. and United Kingdom, it appeared under the name of Tour de charme (not to be confused with the live album of the same name). On the album, Kaas sang her first song in German: the song Ganz und gar (Eng: Absolutely) came from the pen of the German singer and songwriter Marius Müller-Westernhagen. The album also featured three tracks in English, including a cover of the James Brown number It's A Man's World. The British rock musician Chris Rea accompanied Kaas on the tracks Out of the Rain and Ceux qui n'ont rien (Eng: Those who have nothing) on guitar.

Je te dis vous became Kaas's most successful album in the German-speaking world, only just missing out on the German top 10 (it spent 2 weeks at 11th place), but spending 36 weeks in the top 100. In Switzerland, Kaas reached 2nd place in the album charts, and 1st in France. It was her third album to go diamond, 11 months after its appearance. With the single Il me dit que je suis belle (Eng: He tells me I'm beautiful) by Sam Brewski (aka Jean-Jacques Goldman), Kaas achieved her second top five single in France. A remix of Reste sur moi (Eng: Stay on me) reached the top 20 of the American dance charts.

The world tour that followed covered 19 countries. She was the first western singer to appear in Hanoi, Vietnam, after the Vietnam War, and she also toured in Cambodia, Japan, Korea and Thailand. During the tour, she also gave a benefit concert in Chernobyl in front of 30,000 spectators. In total, her audience counted 750,000 in 150 concerts. In 1994, her second live album Tour de charme (Eng: A tour with charm) was published, which, like Carnets de scène, was remade as a live DVD in 2004.

The LP was released as Tour de Charme (not to be mistaken with her second live album) in the US (on 17 August 1993) and the United Kingdom, and shows a slightly different track-listing:

- Track 2 of the wider version (Hôtel Normandy) was replaced by a previously unreleased track (A Saint-Lunaire).
- Track 10 is her rendering of La Vie en Rose
- Ganz und Gar and Out of the Rain were dropped from this version.

=== 1995–1996: Black Coffee ===
In the middle of the 1990s, the album Black Coffee was produced, an enigma in Kaas's career. In 1995, it was decided to produce a work specially for the American market, and containing exclusively English lyrics. It is rumoured that the album was never officially sold. It occasionally becomes available in on-line auctions, however, but the authenticity of such records is in doubt.

The title track of the album is a cover version of the Billie Holiday song of the same name, and was likewise published by Kaas on the 1997 sampler Jazz à Saint-Germain (release by Virgin). Other cover versions on the album include classics such as the Bill Withers number Ain't No Sunshine (which was taken for advertisement music for the Club Mediterranée) from 1971, and If You Leave Me Now by Chicago from 1976.

=== 1997–1998: Dans ma chair ===
In 1997 Dans ma chair (Eng: In my flesh) was made. It was produced in New York by Kaas and Phil Ramone, who had previously worked with Ray Charles, Billy Joel and Paul Simon. The album marked the second time the singer officially worked with the French songwriter Jean-Jacques Goldman (they began to work together in 1993 for the song "Il me dit que je suis belle"). The collaboration with Goldman, which continues, was one of the most important of Kaas's career.

Further contributors to the success of the album were the American songwriter and singer Lyle Lovett, with the song Chanson simple (Eng: Simple song), and James Taylor with Don't Let Me Be Lonely Tonight, on which he duetted with Kaas. The track "Quand j'ai peur de tout" (Eng: When I'm afraid of everything), written by Diane Warren, was remade in 2003 by the band Sugababes under the name "Too Lost in You".

In 1998, following the Dans ma chair tour, the live album and video cassette (later, DVD) Rendez-vous was produced. Among the tracks are L'aigle noir (Eng: The black eagle) by the French singer and songwriter Barbara, whom Kaas had admired for a long time.

In December 1998 Kaas sang with the tenors Plácido Domingo and Alejandro Fernández in the Guildhall of Vienna, Austria. The three were accompanied by the Vienna Philharmonic Orchestra. The concert was made into a CD and DVD in 1999 as Christmas in Vienna Vol. VI.

=== 1999–2000: Le mot de passe ===
In 1999 Le mot de passe (Eng: The password) was produced by Pascal Obispo, on which Kaas was accompanied by an orchestra on several tracks. Jean-Jacques Goldman again contributed to the making of the studio album, among others with 2 songs Une fille de 'l'Est (Eng: A girl from the East) in which Kaas praised her East French heritage, and Les chansons commencent. The French singer Zazie wrote the track J'attends de nous. The song Les éternelles (Eng: The eternals) was also published in Germany as a duet with the Swiss tenor Erkan Aki under the title of Unter der Haut (Eng: Under the skin), and was the theme music of the five-part ZDF serial Sturmzeit (Eng: Stormy Times), based on a book by Charlotte Link.

In June 1999, Kaas appeared at the benefit concert Michael Jackson & Friends in Seoul, South Korea and Munich. Apart from Kaas and Jackson, Mariah Carey, Luther Vandross and Status Quo also appeared. The special events, in aid of UNESCO, the Red Cross and the Nelson Mandela Children's Fund, were broadcast to 39 countries.

In September 1999, Kaas came third in Marianne, a poll for the national symbol of France, behind supermodels Laetitia Casta (first) and Estelle Hallyday (second). Most pictures of Kaas from her last albums (from Dans ma chair to Sexe fort in 2003) show the singer in very figure-accentuating clothes and suitably daring poses, and her music videos are seldom restrained performances. Around this time, Kaas also performed for troops stationed in Kosovo.

On the Le mot de passe tour, Kaas was accompanied at some concerts in Germany and Switzerland by the Hannover Pops Orchestra of Norddeutscher Rundfunk under the conductor's baton of George Pehlivanian. With this ensemble, she was the star guest at, among others, the Schleswig-Holstein Musik Festival of 1999. The concert of 24 July 1999 at the Guildhall Market of Hamburg was broadcast live on the German-French television station Arte. The orchestra can be heard on the 2000 live album Ce sera nous, but does not appear on the live DVD.

In 2000, an elaborately produced box set was published, which contained almost all the previous studio albums published by Sony and a comprehensive booklet with numerous pictures. In October 2000, Kaas received the Adenauer-de Gaulle Prize in Berlin.

=== 2001–2002: Piano Bar ===
In April 2001 Kaas gave a concert before 50,000 spectators on the occasion of Henri, Grand Duke of Luxembourg's accession from his father Jean. Kaas was again accompanied by a large orchestra, on this occasion the Luxembourg Philharmonic. In the same year, Kaas began her acting career with And now... Ladies and Gentlemen with Jeremy Irons, directed by Claude Lelouch, and her record company published the greatest hits album Rien ne s'arrête (Eng: Nothing stops), where only the title track was new.

In 2000, Kaas decided to move permanently to Zürich in Switzerland. This also had consequences for her management, which likewise moved from Paris to Zürich and renamed itself International Talent Consulting. Cyril Prieur and Richard Walter remained by Kaas's side.

To accompany the film, the concept album Piano Bar by Patricia Kaas was released in 2002. While not a soundtrack to the film, some songs performed from the film were included on the album in slightly different versions, making up a sort of concept album inspired by the movie. The real soundtrack has never been released. Piano Bar... was Kaas's first published album sung mainly in English, and is a homage to the great French chanson artists of history. It includes cover versions of Where Do I Begin (originally on the soundtrack to Love Story) and an English version of Jacques Brel's Ne me quitte pas (Eng: Don't leave me), here entitled If You Go Away. The album in France reached 10th place in the charts, but was the second most successful of Kaas's albums in Germany, reaching 12th place. In 2002, Kaas again received the Golden Europa.

The Piano Bar Live tour began in September 2002 in France and lasted until April 2003. It included six sell-out concerts in the US, including appearances in Los Angeles, Chicago, San Francisco and Detroit, as well as at the Beacon Theatre on Broadway, New York, before 6,000 fans. Despite intensive efforts by Kaas's fans, the tour has not been published as a live album.

=== 2003–2007: Sexe fort ===
On 1 December 2003, the album Sexe fort (Eng: Strong gender) was released, reaching 9th place in France. Again, Jean-Jacques Goldman contributed with C'est la faute à la vie (Eng: It's the fault of life) and On pourrait (Eng: We could), which he also produced himself, just as Pascal Obispo, the producer of Le mot de passe, did with L'Abbé Caillou (Eng: Father Caillou). Kaas sang On pourrait as a duet with the Swiss singer Stephan Eicher.

Following the release of Sexe fort, Kaas received a particular distinction on 8 December 2003 when she received the First Class Order of Merit of the Federal Republic of Germany for her contribution to friendship between France and Germany, an honour that until then had been awarded to only a few international artists.

Until the end of 2005, Kaas was on what was by then her seventh world tour. In total, she performed in 25 countries, including further appearances in China and Russia. In all, she gave 175 concerts before more than 500,000 spectators. Despite the relative failure of Sexe fort, the tour was a huge success.

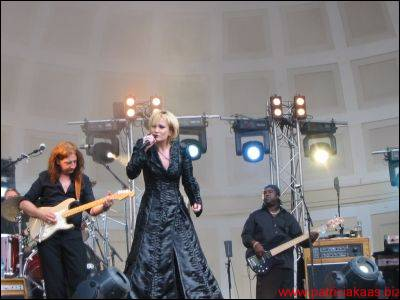
Patricia Kaas on her Sexe fort-tour in 2005

By the beginning of 2005, the live album accompanying the tour Toute la musique... and the live DVD of the same name, had been released, in combination with a 'best of' album. The title track Toute la musique que j'aime (Eng: All the music I love) was written by the French singer and songwriter Johnny Hallyday. The album contains a bonus track, Herz eines Kämpfers (Eng: Heart of a Fighter), which Kaas had worked on with Peter Plate of German pop band Rosenstolz. For the TV broadcast of the German auditions for the Eurovision Song Contest 2005 in March of that year, Kaas performed the song for the first time live before an audience of millions.

=== 2008–2010: Kabaret, world tour and Eurovision 2009 ===
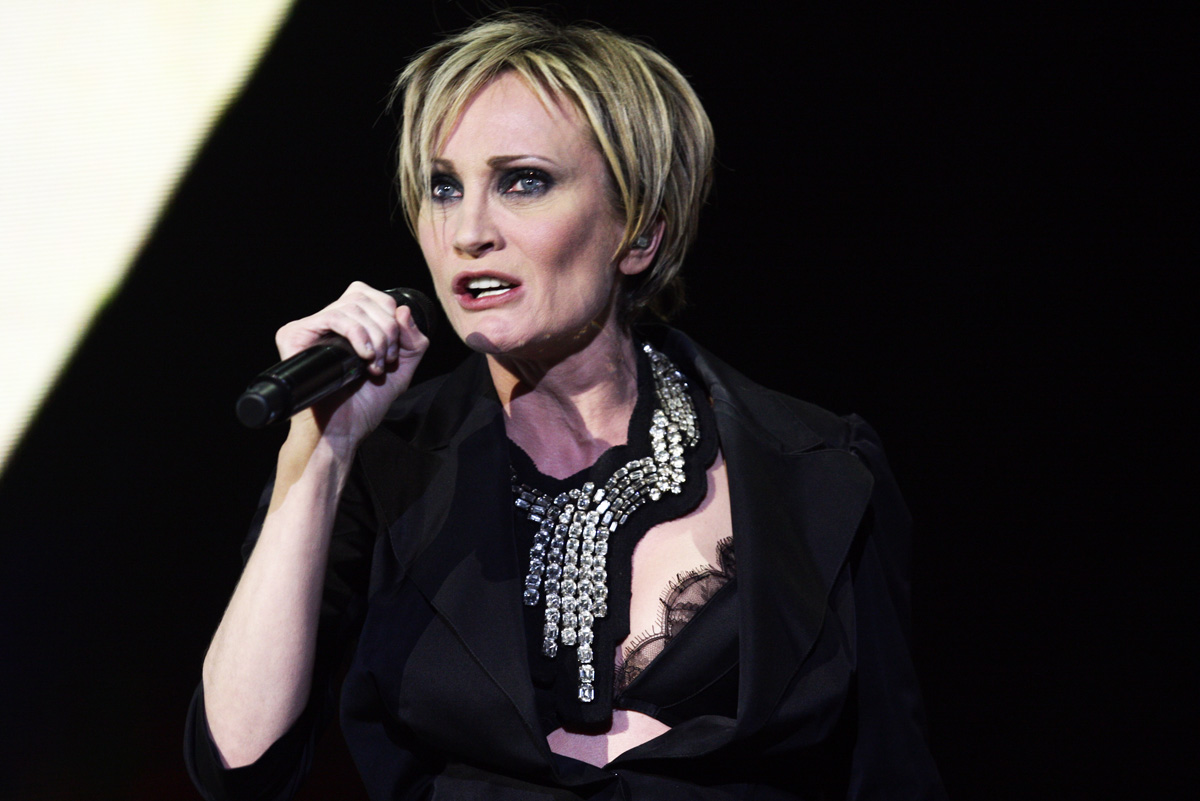
Patricia Kaas in Moscow, 2009

After the end of the Sexe fort tour in November 2005, Kaas took a break until the beginning of 2008, interrupted by only a few live performances. In February 2008, Kaas released the song Ne pozvonish' (You Will Not Call) with the Russian rock group Uma2rman, which was a big hit in Russia.

The new double album, Kabaret, was released on 30 March 2009. To support her new album, Kaas gave concerts in France, Germany, Switzerland, Belgium, Luxembourg, Finland, Russia, Ukraine, Poland, Latvia, Lithuania, Estonia, Romania and other countries during her "Kabaret" tour. Kaas is claimed to be the first international artist to visit 28 Russian cities. The entire tour included at least 170 dates.

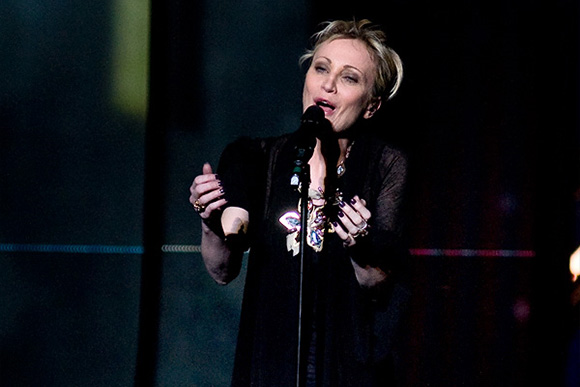
Patricia Kaas at Moscow Eurovision Song Contest 2009

On 28 January 2009, it was confirmed that Kaas would represent France in the Eurovision Song Contest 2009 in Moscow, Russia. Kaas's fans took part in an online poll in several countries, where they selected their favourite song from her Kabaret album. The song "Et s'il fallait le faire" (And if it had to be done) received a clear majority of the votes and was then chosen as the lead single, and also as the French entry, in the Eurovision Song Contest 2009 where, on 16 May 2009, she finished in 8th place. The song received positive reviews in several newspapers and polls, and a clear majority of 62% of voters in a questionnaire believed in her chances to win the competition.

=== 2011: L'ombre de ma voix ===
In 2011, Kaas's autobiography L’Ombre de ma Voix (The Shadow of My Voice), ghostwritten with Sophie Blandinières, was published in March by Flammarion.

=== 2012–2014: Kaas chante Piaf ===
Kaas chante Piaf ("Kaas sings Piaf") was Kaas's new project, focusing on twenty-one of the great Edith Piaf's iconic titles, arranged by Abel Korzeniowski. This show, commemorating 50 years since the death of Piaf, opened at some of the world's most prestigious venues, like the Royal Albert Hall in London, Carnegie Hall in New-York, Olympia in Paris, Operetta Theatre in Moscow, and Sejong Cultural Center in Seoul. Although designed primarily as a live show, Kaas chante Piaf was also released as an album.

== Discography ==
- Mademoiselle chante... (1988)
- Scène de vie (1990)
- Je te dis vous (1993)
- Dans ma chair (1997)
- Le Mot de passe (1999)
- Piano Bar (2002)
- Sexe fort (2003)
- Kabaret (2008)
- Kaas chante Piaf (2012)
- Patricia Kaas (2016)

== Acting career ==
=== Germinal & Falling in Love Again ===
In 1993, Kaas was offered a role in the Claude Berri film Germinal, but at the time she was working on her third album Je te dis vous. In 1994, Kaas was offered the main role in the film Falling in Love Again by the American director Stanley Donen. Kaas needed no better model than the German-American singer and actress Marlene Dietrich, whose song Lili Marleen she had often sung as a child. However, the project foundered owing to financial problems.

Her first successful encounter with the film industry remained in the field of singing, when she sang the title song to the 1995 film Les Misérables, based on the novel of the same name by Victor Hugo and directed by Frenchman Claude Lelouch. Her earlier hit, Il me dit que suis belle, from the 1993 album Je te dis vous, was also used by Bertrand Tavernier in his film L'appât (Eng: The bait).

=== And now... Ladies And Gentlemen ===
Kaas had her acting debut in 2001, playing the jazz singer Jane beside Jeremy Irons in Claude Lelouch's And now... Ladies and Gentlemen. The film was shown at the Cannes Film Festival among others. In Germany, the film was first seen in October 2002 at 19 Days of French Film in Tübingen, but only arrived in German cinemas in 2003, where it fared poorly at the box office.

=== Assassinée ===
Patricia Kaas played the role of a woman wounded by life for the television production "Assassinée" (Murdered), by Thierry Binisti, that aired May 2012.

=== Controversy ===
In January 2026, Patricia Kaas gave a private concert as part of the 25^{th} anniversary celebrations for the Russian retail chain Rendez-Vous which occurred in the French Alps Courchevel ski resort, renowned for attracting a very wealthy clientele. The organization of this event, which was attended by prominent Russian influencers, who travelled to France by private jet, sparked controversy in Russia. Criticism arose among both customers and employees of the Rendez-Vous retail chain, as well as among Russian soldiers engaged in the war of invasion in the eastern provinces of Ukraine when images of the event reached them via social media. https://www.franceinfo.fr/monde/russie/hotel-de-luxe-champagne-et-patricia-kaas-le-voyage-promotionnel-de-celebrites-russes-a-courchevel-cree-une-polemique-dans-le-pays_7762742.html

=== Private life ===
She was the companion of the cook Yannick Alléno.

== Filmography ==
Year	Film
2002	And Now... Ladies And Gentlemen Director: Claude Lelouch Actors: Patricia Kaas, Jeremy Irons, Claudia Cardinale Premiere: 29 May 2002 (France) And now... Ladies And Gentlemen at IMDb

== Awards ==
Year	Awards	Category
until 1989
1988	Victoire de la Musique	"Discovery of the year" for D'Allemagne
1989	Victoire de la Musique	"Female musician with most record sales abroad"
1990–1999
1990	Golden Europa	"Female singer of the year"
1991	Victoire de la Musique	"Female interpreter of the year", "Female musician with most record sales abroad"
1991	World Music Award	"Best French female artist of the year"
1991	Bambi	"Female artist of the year"
1992	Victoire de la Musique	"Female artist with most record sales abroad"
1992	ECHO	3rd place "Best international female singer"
1994	L’Oscar de la musique	
1995	Victoire de la Musique	"Artist with most record sales abroad"
1995	La femme en or	
1995	World Music Award	"Best French female artist of the year"
1996	Platinum Europe Award	for Tour de charme
1998	IFPI Platinum Europe Award	for Dans ma chair
from 2000
2000	Victoire de la Musique	
2000	Adenauer-de-Gaulle Prize	
2002	Goldene Europa	"International female artist of the year"
2003	Bundesverdienstkreuz	Order of Merit First Class of the Federal Republic of Germany for her efforts in improving German-French relations
2004	Radio Regenbogen Award	
2008	Zolotoy Gramofon (Gold Gramophone)	Song "Ne Pozvonish (You Won't Call)" with Uma2Rman
2009	Marcel Bezençon Award	Song "Et s'il fallait le faire"

Preceded by Sébastien Tellier with Divine	France in the Eurovision Song Contest; 2009	Succeeded by Jessy Matador with Allez Ola Olé
