= List of best-selling albums in France =

This is a list of the best-selling albums in France that have been certified by the Syndicat National de l'Édition Phonographique (SNEP).

== Diamond album certifications ==
The SNEP provides "certifications" for album sales, similar to the RIAA's. Diamond awards were instituted November 1, 1988.

Certification	Before May 1, 2005	Before July 1, 2009	After July 1, 2009
Diamond	1,000,000	750,000	500,000

== List of albums certified Diamond in France ==
Year	Artist	Album	Certification	Certified sales
1993	Ace of Base	Happy Nation	Diamond	1,000,000
1999	Alain Souchon	Au ras des paquerettes	Diamond	1,000,000
1993	Alain Souchon	C'est déjà ça	Diamond	1,000,000
1995	André Rieu	Valses	Diamond	1,000,000
1997	Andrea Bocelli	Romanza	Diamond	1,000,000
2016	Soprano	L'Everest	2× Diamond^{‡}	1,000,000
2017	Damso	Ipséité	2× Diamond^{‡}	1,000,000
2018	Angèle	Brol	2× Diamond^{‡}	1,000,000
2019	Nekfeu	Les étoiles vagabondes	2× Diamond^{‡}	1,000,000
2019	Vitaa ft Slimane	VersuS	2× Diamond^{‡}	1,000,000
2005	Benabar	Reprise des Négociations	Diamond	1,000,000
1984	Bob Marley and the Wailers	Legend	Diamond	1,000,000
2013	Bruno Mars	Unorthodox Jukebox	Diamond	500,000
2019	Billie Eilish	When We All Fall Asleep, Where Do We Go?	Diamond^{‡}	500,000
2002	Calogero	Calogero	Diamond	1,000,000
2004	Calogero	3	Diamond	1,000,000
2014	Calogero	Les Feux d'Artifice	Diamond	500,000
1995	Céline Dion	D'eux	Diamond	1,000,000
1996	Céline Dion	Falling into You	Diamond	1,000,000
1997	Céline Dion	Let's Talk About Love	Diamond	1,000,000
1998	Céline Dion	S'il suffisait d'aimer	Diamond	1,000,000
2012	Céline Dion	Sans attendre	Diamond	500,000
2016	Céline Dion	Encore un soir	Diamond	500,000
2004	Chimène Badi	Dis moi que tu m'aimes	Diamond	750,000
2014	Christine and the Queens	Chaleur humaine	Diamond	500,000
2007	Christophe Maé	Mon Paradis	Diamond	750,000
2010	Christophe Maé	On trace la route	Diamond	500,000
2013	Christophe Maé	Je veux du bonheur	Diamond	500,000
2009	Cœur de Pirate	Cœur de Pirate	Diamond	500,000
2008	Coldplay	Viva la Vida or Death and All His Friends	Diamond	500,000
2015	Coldplay	A Head Full of Dreams	Diamond^{‡}	500,000
2013	Daft Punk	Random Access Memories	2× Diamond^{‡}	1,000,000
2009	David Guetta	One Love	Diamond	500,000
2010	David Guetta	Nothing but the Beat	Diamond	500,000
2001	Dido	No Angel	Diamond	1,000,000
1985	Dire Straits	Brothers in Arms	Diamond	1,000,000
1988	Dire Straits	Money for Nothing	Diamond	1,000,000
1991	Dire Straits	On every street	Diamond	1,000,000
2020	Dua Lipa	Future Nostalgia	Diamond^{‡}	500,000
1977	Eagles	Hotel California	Diamond	1,000,000
2017	Ed Sheeran	÷	2× Diamond^{‡}	1,000,000
1990	Elton John	The Very Best of Elton John	Diamond	1,000,000
1997	Era	Era	Diamond	1,000,000
1995	Florent Pagny	Bienvenue chez moi	Diamond	1,000,000
1997	Florent Pagny	Savoir aimer	Diamond	1,000,000
2003	Florent Pagny	Ailleurs Land	Diamond	1,000,000
2013	Florent Pagny	Vieillir avec toi	Diamond	500,000
1987	France Gall	Babacar	Diamond	1,000,000
1980	Francis Cabrel	Fragile	Diamond	1,000,000
1987	Francis Cabrel	77/87	Diamond	1,000,000
1989	Francis Cabrel	Sarbacane	Diamond	1,000,000
1994	Francis Cabrel	Samedi soir sur la terre	Diamond	1,000,000
1999	Francis Cabrel	Hors saison	Diamond	1,000,000
2008	Francis Cabrel	Des roses et des orties	Diamond	750,000
1990	Fredericks Goldman Jones	Fredericks Goldman Jones	Diamond	1,000,000
1993	Fredericks Goldman Jones	Rouge	Diamond	1,000,000
1996	The Fugees	The Score	Diamond	1,000,000
2000	Garou	Seul	Diamond	1,000,000
2000	Gerald de Palmas	Marcher dans le sable	Diamond	1,000,000
2018	Gims	Ceinture noire	2× Diamond^{‡}	1,000,000
2001	Henri Salvador	Chambre avec vue	Diamond	1,000,000
1997	IAM	L'école du micro d'argent	Diamond	1,000,000
2017	Imagine Dragons	Evolve	Diamond^{‡}	500,000
2014	Indila	Mini World	Diamond	500,000
2002	Indochine	Paradize	Diamond	1,000,000
2001	Isabelle Boulay	Mieux qu'ici bas	Diamond	1,000,000
1988	Jacques Brel	15 ans d'amour	Diamond	1,000,000
2005	James Blunt	Back to Bedlam	Diamond	750,000
2007	James Blunt	All the Lost Souls	Diamond	500,000
1997	James Horner	Titanic	Diamond	1,000,000
2009	Jean Ferrat	Best of 3 CD	Diamond	500,000
1984	Jean-Jacques Goldman	Positif	Diamond	1,000,000
1985	Jean-Jacques Goldman	Non homologué	Diamond	1,000,000
1987	Jean-Jacques Goldman	Entre gris clair et gris foncé	Diamond	1,000,000
1996	Jean-Jacques Goldman	Singulier	Diamond	1,000,000
1997	Jean-Jacques Goldman	En passant	Diamond	1,000,000
2001	Jean-Jacques Goldman	Chansons pour les pieds	Diamond	1,000,000
1999	Johnny Hallyday	Sang pour sang	Diamond	1,000,000
2002	Johnny Hallyday	À la vie à la mort!	Diamond	1,000,000
2005	Johnny Hallyday	Ma vérité	Diamond	750,000
2012	Johnny Hallyday	L'Attente	Diamond	500,000
2014	Johnny Hallyday	Rester vivant	Diamond	500,000
2018	Johnny Hallyday	Mon Pays C'est L'Amour	3× Diamond^{‡}	1,500,000
1979	Julio Iglesias	À vous les femmes	Diamond	1,000,000
1980	Julio Iglesias	Sentimental	Diamond	1,000,000
2014	Kendji Girac	Kendji	3× Diamond^{‡}	1,500,000
2015	Kendji Girac	Ensemble	2× Diamond^{‡}	1,000,000
2003	Kyo	Le chemin	Diamond	1,000,000
2001	L 5	L5	Diamond	1,000,000
2008	Lady Gaga	The Fame	3× Diamond^{‡}	1,500,000
2018	Lady Gaga	A Star is Born	Diamond	500,000
2012	Lana Del Rey	Born to Die	Diamond	500,000
1997	Lara Fabian	Pure	Diamond	1,000,000
2006	Laurent Voulzy	La septième vague	Diamond	750,000
2015	Louane	Chambre 12	2× Diamond^{‡}	1,000,000
1986	Madonna	True Blue	Diamond	1,000,000
1990	Madonna	The Immaculate Collection	Diamond	1,000,000
2005	Madonna	Confessions on a Dancefloor	Diamond	750,000
2013	Maître Gims	Subliminal	Diamond	500,000
2015	Maître Gims	Mon cœur avait raison	Diamond	500,000
1998	Manau	Panique celtique	Diamond	1,000,000
1998	Manu Chao	Clandestino	Diamond	1,000,000
1993	Mariah Carey	Music Box	Diamond	1,000,000
1982	Michael Jackson	Thriller	Diamond	1,000,000
1987	Michael Jackson	Bad	Diamond	1,000,000
1991	Michael Jackson	Dangerous	Diamond	1,000,000
1995	Michael Jackson	HIStory	Diamond	1,000,000
2004	Michel Sardou	Du plaisir	Diamond	1,000,000
2007	Mika	Life in Cartoon Motion	2× Diamond^{‡}	1,000,000
1999	Moby	Play	Diamond	1,000,000
2009	Mozart l'opéra rock	Mozart l'opéra rock	Diamond	500,000
2009	Muse	The Resistance	Diamond	500,000
1988	Mylène Farmer	Ainsi soit je...	Diamond	1,000,000
1991	Mylène Farmer	L'autre...	Diamond	1,000,000
1995	Mylène Farmer	Anamorphosée	Diamond	1,000,000
1999	Mylène Farmer	Innamoramento	Diamond	1,000,000
2001	Mylène Farmer	Les mots	Diamond	1,000,000
2010	Mylène Farmer	Bleu noir	Diamond	500,000
2012	Mylène Farmer	Monkey Me	Diamond	500,000
1972	Neil Young	Harvest	Diamond	1,000,000
1991	Nirvana	Nevermind	Diamond	1,000,000
2002	Norah Jones	Come Away With Me	Diamond	1,000,000
2011	Nolwenn Leroy	Bretonne	Diamond	500,000
2005	Olivia Ruiz	La femme chocolat	Diamond	1,000,000
2017	Orelsan	La fête est finie	2× Diamond^{‡}	1,000,000
1996	Pascal Obispo	Superflu	Diamond	1,000,000
1988	Patricia Kaas	Mademoiselle chante...	Diamond	1,000,000
1990	Patricia Kaas	Scène de vie	Diamond	1,000,000
1993	Patricia Kaas	Je te dis vous	Diamond	1,000,000
1989	Patrick Bruel	Alors regarde	Diamond	1,000,000
2000	Patrick Bruel	Juste avant	Diamond	1,000,000
2002	Patrick Bruel	Entre deux	Diamond	1,000,000
1989	Phil Collins	...But Seriously	Diamond	1,000,000
1975	Pink Floyd	Wish You Were Here	Diamond	1,000,000
1979	Pink Floyd	The Wall	Diamond	1,000,000
2016	PNL	Deux frères	2× Diamond^{‡}	1,000,000
1992	Pow Wow	Regagner les plaines	Diamond	1,000,000
1991	Queen	Greatest Hits II	Diamond	1,000,000
2005	Raphaël	Caravane	Diamond	750,000
1985	Renaud	Mistral gagnant	Diamond	1,000,000
2002	Renaud	Boucan d'enfer	Diamond	1,000,000
2016	Renaud	Renaud	Diamond	500,000
1989	Roch Voisine	Hélène	Diamond	1,000,000
2008	Seal	Soul	Diamond	750,000
2012	Sexion D'Assaut	L'Apogée	Diamond	500,000
2012	Shakira	Sale El Sol	Diamond	500,000
1991	Simon & Garfunkel	The Definitive Simon & Garfunkel	Diamond	1,000,000
1982	Simon & Garfunkel	Live in Central Park	Diamond	1,000,000
2014	Soprano	Cosmopolitanie	Diamond	500,000
1996	Spice Girls	Spice	Diamond	1,000,000
2013	Stromae	Racine carrée	4× Diamond	2,000,000
2005	La troupe du roi soleil	Le roi soleil	Diamond	750,000
2010	The Black Eyed Peas	The Beginning	Diamond	500,000
2009	The Black Eyed Peas	The E.N.D.	Diamond	500,000
1996	The Cranberries	No Need to Argue	Diamond	1,000,000
2020	The Weeknd	After Hours	Diamond^{‡}	500,000
1987	Tracy Chapman	Tracy Chapman	Diamond	1,000,000
1992	Whitney Houston/Various Artists	The Bodyguard: Original Soundtrack Album	Diamond	1,000,000
2004	Various artists	Les choristes	Diamond	1,000,000
1998	Various artists	Les dix commandements	Diamond	1,000,000
1995	Various artists	Mozart-Requiem-Eblouissante Musique Sacre	Diamond	1,000,000
1996	Various artists	Les plus belles chansons françaises 1962	Diamond	1,000,000
1998	Various artists	Notre-Dame de Paris	Diamond	1,000,000
2000	Various artists	Roméo et Juliette, de la Haine à l'Amour	Diamond	1,000,000
2000	Various artists	Starmania 79	Diamond	1,000,000
2000	Yannick Noah	Yannick Noah	Diamond	1,000,000
2003	Yannick Noah	Pokhara	Diamond	1,000,000
2006	Yannick Noah	Charango	Diamond	750,000
2010	Yannick Noah	Frontières	Diamond	500,000
2010	Zaz	Zaz	2× Diamond	1,000,000
2013	Zaz	Recto verso	Diamond	500,000
1997	Zucchero	The Best of Zucchero	Diamond	1,000,000
1992	ZZ Top	Greatest Hits	Diamond	1,000,000

== List of best-selling albums in France by claimed sales ==
Year	Artist	Album	Certification	Sales
1995	Céline Dion	D'eux	Diamond	4,500,000
1994	Francis Cabrel	Samedi soir sur la terre	Diamond	4,000,000
1982	Michael Jackson	Thriller	Diamond	3,500,000
1979	Supertramp	Breakfast In America	Platinum	3,200,000
1989	Patrick Bruel	Alors regarde	Diamond	3,000,000
1997	Louise Attaque	Louise Attaque	Diamond	2,700,000
1973	The Beatles	1962–1966	Platinum	2,600,000
1974	Pink Floyd	The Dark Side of the Moon	Platinum	2,500,000
1998	Various artists	Notre-Dame de Paris	Diamond	2,500,000
2013	Stromae	Racine carrée	4× Diamond	2,500,000
1987	Jean-Jacques Goldman	Entre gris clair et gris foncé	Diamond	2,300,000
1991	Mylène Farmer	L'autre...	Diamond	2,200,000
1991	Michael Jackson	Dangerous	Diamond	2,100,000
2002	Renaud	Boucan d'enfer	Diamond	2,100,000
1989	Francis Cabrel	Sarbacane	Diamond	2,100,000
1997	Andrea Bocelli	Romanza	Diamond	2,000,000
1985	Dire Straits	Brothers in Arms	Diamond	2,000,000
1990	Fredericks Goldman Jones	Fredericks Goldman Jones	Diamond	2,000,000
1990	Phil Collins	...But Seriously	Diamond	2,000,000
1999	Johnny Hallyday	Sang pour sang	Diamond	1,850,000
1998	Éric Serra	Le grand bleu		1,800,000
2011	Adele	21		1,740,000
2004	Bruno Coulais	The Chorus	Diamond	1,600,000
1997	James Horner	Titanic: Music from the Motion Picture	Diamond	1,600,000
2001	Mylène Farmer	Les Mots	Diamond	1,600,000
1995	Florent Pagny	Bienvenue chez moi	Diamond	1,500,000
1978	Jean-Michel Jarre	Equinoxe	Platinum	1,500,000
1976	Jean-Michel Jarre	Oxygène	Platinum	1,500,000
2018	Johnny Hallyday	Mon pays c'est l'amour	3× Diamond	1,500,000
1998	Manu Chao	Clandestino	Diamond	1,500,000
1988	Mylène Farmer	Ainsi soit je...	Diamond	1,500,000
1983	Renaud	Morgane de toi	Platinum	1,500,000
1994	The Cranberries	No Need to Argue	Diamond	1,500,000
2003	Carla Bruni	Quelqu'un m'a dit		1,500,000

== Notes ==
- ^{‡}Certification include on-demand audio and video streams and track sale equivalent
