= List of number-one singles of 2003 (France) =

This is a list of the French SNEP Top 100 Singles and Top 150 albums number-ones of 2003.

== Number ones by week ==
=== Singles chart ===
Week	Issue date	Artist(s)	Single
1	January 4	Star Academy 2	"Paris Latino"
2	January 11	Star Academy 2	"Paris Latino"
3	January 18	Star Academy 2	"Paris Latino"
4	January 25	Star Academy 2	"Paris Latino"
5	February 1	Alphonse Brown	"Le Frunkp"
6	February 8	Alphonse Brown	"Le Frunkp"
7	February 15	Alphonse Brown	"Le Frunkp"
8	February 22	Alphonse Brown	"Le Frunkp"
9	March 1	Alphonse Brown	"Le Frunkp"
10	March 8	Alphonse Brown	"Le Frunkp"
11	March 15	Alphonse Brown	"Le Frunkp"
12	March 22	Nolwenn Leroy	"Cassé"
13	March 29	Nolwenn Leroy	"Cassé"
14	April 5	Chimène Badi	"Entre nous"
15	April 12	Chimène Badi	"Entre nous"
16	April 19	Florent Pagny	"Ma liberté de penser"
17	April 26	Florent Pagny	"Ma liberté de penser"
18	May 3	Florent Pagny	"Ma liberté de penser"
19	May 10	Florent Pagny	"Ma liberté de penser"
20	May 17	Florent Pagny	"Ma liberté de penser"
21	May 24	Florent Pagny	"Ma liberté de penser"
22	May 31	Lorie	"Sur un air latino"
23	June 7	Pascal Obispo	"Fan"
24	June 14	Lorie	"Sur un air latino"
25	June 21	DJ BoBo	"Chihuahua"
26	June 28	DJ BoBo	"Chihuahua"
27	July 5	DJ BoBo	"Chihuahua"
28	July 12	DJ BoBo	"Chihuahua"
29	July 19	DJ BoBo	"Chihuahua"
30	July 26	DJ BoBo	"Chihuahua"
31	August 2	DJ BoBo	"Chihuahua"
32	August 9	DJ BoBo	"Chihuahua"
33	August 16	DJ BoBo	"Chihuahua"
34	August 23	DJ BoBo	"Chihuahua"
35	August 30	Jocelyne Labylle, Cheela, Jacob Desvarieux and Passi	"Laisse parler les gens"
36	September 6	Jocelyne Labylle, Cheela, Jacob Desvarieux and Passi	"Laisse parler les gens"
37	September 13	Jocelyne Labylle, Cheela, Jacob Desvarieux and Passi	"Laisse parler les gens"
38	September 20	Lorna	"Papi chulo... (te traigo el mmmm...)"
39	September 27	Tragédie	"Hey Oh"
40	October 4	Tragédie	"Hey Oh"
41	October 11	Tragédie	"Hey Oh"
42	October 18	Tragédie	"Hey Oh"
43	October 25	Tragédie	"Hey Oh"
44	November 1	Tragédie	"Hey Oh"
45	November 8	Tragédie	"Hey Oh"
46	November 15	Linkup	"Mon étoile"
47	November 22	Linkup	"Mon étoile"
48	November 29	Linkup	"Mon étoile"
49	December 6	Tragédie	"Hey Oh"
50	December 13	Star Academy 3	"L'Orange" / "Wot"
51	December 20	Star Academy 3	"L'Orange" / "Wot"
52	December 27	Star Academy 3	"L'Orange" / "Wot"

=== Albums chart ===
Week	Issue date	Artist	Album
1	January 4	Star Academy 2	Star Academy chante les tubes des années 80
2	January 11	Star Academy 2	Star Academy chante les tubes des années 80
3	January 18	Star Academy 2	Star Academy chante les tubes des années 80
4	January 25	Carla Bruni	Quelqu'un m'a dit
5	February 1	Carla Bruni	Quelqu'un m'a dit
6	February 8	Carla Bruni	Quelqu'un m'a dit
7	February 15	Massive Attack	100th Window
8	February 22	Les Enfoirés	La Foire aux Enfoirés
9	March 1	Les Enfoirés	La Foire aux Enfoirés
10	March 8	Nolwenn Leroy	Nolwenn
11	March 15	Hélène Ségara	Humaine
12	March 22	Hélène Ségara	Humaine
13	March 29	Céline Dion	One Heart
14	April 5	Céline Dion	One Heart
15	April 12	Florent Pagny	Ailleurs land
16	April 19	Florent Pagny	Ailleurs land
17	April 26	Madonna	American Life
18	May 3	Florent Pagny	Ailleurs land
19	May 10	Florent Pagny	Ailleurs land
20	May 17	Florent Pagny	Ailleurs land
21	May 24	Florent Pagny	Ailleurs land
22	May 31	Florent Pagny	Ailleurs land
23	June 7	Jean-Jacques Goldman	Un tour ensemble
24	June 14	Radiohead	Hail to the Thief
25	June 21	Jean-Jacques Goldman	Un tour ensemble
26	June 28	Jean-Jacques Goldman	Un tour ensemble
27	July 5	Norah Jones	Come Away with Me
28	July 12	Norah Jones	Come Away with Me
29	July 19	Norah Jones	Come Away with Me
30	July 26	Norah Jones	Come Away with Me
31	August 2	Norah Jones	Come Away with Me
32	August 9	Norah Jones	Come Away with Me
33	August 16	Norah Jones	Come Away with Me
34	August 23	Norah Jones	Come Away with Me
35	August 30	Norah Jones	Come Away with Me
36	September 6	Norah Jones	Come Away with Me
37	September 13	Norah Jones	Come Away with Me
38	September 20	IAM	Revoir un printemps
39	September 27	Muse	Absolution
40	October 4	Dido	Life for Rent
41	October 11	Dido	Life for Rent
42	October 18	Céline Dion	1 fille & 4 types
43	October 25	Céline Dion	1 fille & 4 types
44	November 1	Céline Dion	1 fille & 4 types
45	November 8	Johnny Hallyday	Parc des Princes 2003
46	November 15	Céline Dion	1 filles & 4 types
47	November 22	Britney Spears	In the Zone
48	November 29	M	Qui de nous deux
49	December 6	M	Qui de nous deux
50	December 13	Tragédie	Tragédie
51	December 20	Star Academy 3	Les Meilleurs Moments
52	December 27	Star Academy 3	Les Meilleurs Moments

== Top ten best sales ==
This is the ten best-selling singles and albums in 2003.

=== Singles ===
Pos.	Artist	Title
1	DJ BoBo	"Chihuahua"
2	Tragédie	"Hey Oh"
3	J. Labylle and Cheela featuring J. Desvarieux & Passi	"Laisse parler les gens"
4	Chimène Badi	"Entre Nous"
5	Alphonse Brown	"Le Frunkp"
6	Lorie	"Sur un air latino"
7	Hermes House Band and DJ Ötzi	"Live Is Life"
8	Florent Pagny	"Ma Liberté de penser"
9	Diam's	"DJ"
10	Multi-interprètes	"We Will Rock You (remix)"

=== Albums ===
Pos.	Artist	Title
1	Norah Jones	Come Away with Me
2	Florent Pagny	Ailleurs land
3	Carla Bruni	Quelqu'un m'a dit
4	Kyo	Le Chemin
5	Céline Dion	1 fille & 4 types
6	Les Enfoirés	La Foire aux Enfoirés
7	Dido	Life for Rent
8	Calogero	Calogero
9	Hélène Ségara	Humaine
10	Evanescence	Fallen

== See also ==
- 2003 in music
- List of artists who reached number one on the French Singles Chart
