= Merci =

Merci is a French word meaning "thank you".

Merci may refer to:

in music

- Merci (Alpha Blondy album), 2002
- Merci (Florent Pagny album), 1990
- Merci (Magma album), 1984

in other contexts

- Merci (candy), a brand of chocolate manufactured by August Storck KG
- Merci (restaurant), in Yucatán, Mexico
- MERCI Retriever, a medical device used for treating ischemic strokes
- Movement for Citizens' Commitment and Awakening (French: Mouvement pour l'engagement et le réveil des citoyens, abbreviated MERCI), a political party in Benin led by Séverin Adjovi
