= Preface (disambiguation) =

Preface or Proem may refer to:

- Preface, an introduction to a book or other literary work written by the work's author.
- Preface (liturgy), portion of the Eucharistic Prayer that immediately precedes the Canon or central portion of the Eucharist

== Literature ==
- Preface (collection opening, Volume II), first volume of Evenings on a Farm Near Dikanka by Nikolai Gogol, written in 1832
- Prefaces, a book by Søren Kierkegaard published under the pseudonym Nicolaus Notabene

== Music ==
- Preface (band), a French musical band (1985-1988)
- Preface, an album by Jessica Harp
- The Preface, an album by Elzhi
- Proem (EP), an EP by King 810
