= Les Parfums de sa vie (Je l'ai tant aimée) =

1988 single by Art Mengo

Single by Art Mengo

from the album Un 15 août en février
- B-side: "Instrumental"
- Released: October 1988
- Recorded: 1988
- Studio: Polygone Studios, France
- Genre: Pop, chanson
- Length: 4:10
- Label: CBS
- Composer: Art Mengo
- Lyricist: Patrice Guirao
- Producers: J. Mora, J. Bailly, Jacques Hermet

Art Mengo singles chronology
| "Les Parfums de sa vie (Je l'ai tant aimée)" (1988) | "Où trouver les violons" (1990) |

"Les Parfums de sa vie (Je l'ai tant aimée)" (French pronunciation: [le paʁfœ̃ də sa vi ʒə le tɑ̃ ɛme]) is a 1988 song recorded by French artist Art Mengo. Written by Patrice Guirao with a music composed by Mengo, it was his debut single from his 1990 album Un 15 août en février on which it is the ninth track and was released in October 1988. The accompanying music video was directed by Oliver Dony. In France, it became a top ten hit and Mengo's most successful single. In February 1997, Mengo performed the song during his concert in Toulouse and this version available on his album Live au Mandala. In 2000, the song was notably covered by Florent Pagny which released it as the second single from his album RéCréation and made it a top 40 single in France and Belgium (Wallonia).

== Critical reception ==
A review in Pan-European magazine Music & Media stated: "Underpinned by a bouncy and attractive bass line this song shows what a highly expressive voice Mengo has. Strong, easy-going pop".

== Chart performance ==
In France, the original version of "Les Parfums de sa vie (Je l'ai tant aimée)" entered the singles chart at number 34 on the chart edition of 5 November 1988, reached a peak of number nine for a sole week four weeks later, and stayed in the top 50 for a total of 13 weeks. On the European Hot 100 Singles, it debuted at number 64 on 3 December 1988, achieved his highest position, number 38, in its third week, and fall of the chart after five weeks of presence.

The cover version by Florent Pagny entered the French chart at number 55 on 29 January 2000, peaked at number 38 the next week and totaled ten weeks in the top 100. In Belgium (Wallonia), it peaked at number 30 on 4 March 2000, and remained in the top 40 for six weeks.

== Track listings ==
Art Mengo version

- 7" single
1. "Les Parfums de sa vie (Je l'ai tant aimée)" — 4:10
2. "Les Parfums de sa vie (Je l'ai tant aimée)" (instrumental) — 4:10
- 12" maxi
1. "Les Parfums de sa vie (Je l'ai tant aimée)" (club remix) — 6:22
2. "Les Parfums de sa vie (Je l'ai tant aimée)" (house mix) — 5:34
- CD maxi
1. "Les Parfums de sa vie (Je l'ai tant aimée)" — 4:10
2. "Les Parfums de sa vie (Je l'ai tant aimée)" (club remix) — 6:22
3. "Les Parfums de sa vie (Je l'ai tant aimée)" (house mix) — 5:34

Florent Pagny version

- CD single
1. "Les Parfums de sa vie (Je l'ai tant aimée)" — 4:45
2. "Pars" — 4:25

== Charts ==
By Art Mengo

| Chart (1988–1989) | Peak position |
|---|---|
| Europe (European Hot 100) | 38 |
| France (SNEP) | 9 |

By Florent Pagny

| Chart (2000) | Peak position |
|---|---|
| Belgium (Ultratop 50 Wallonia) | 30 |
| France (SNEP) | 38 |

== Release history ==
| Country | Date | Format | Label |
|---|---|---|---|
| France, Belgium | 1988 | CD maxi | CBS |
| France, Belgium | 1988 | 7" single | CBS |
| France, Belgium | 1988 | 12" maxi | CBS |
| France, Belgium | 2000 | CD single | Mercury |
