= Carnets de scène =

Live album by Patricia Kaas
- Released: November 1991
- Genre: Pop
- Labels: Sony Musique; Columbia Records

Patricia Kaas chronology
| Scène de vie (1990) | Carnets de scène (1991) | Je te dis vous (1993) |

Professional ratings
Review scores
| Source | Rating |
|---|---|
| Allmusic | 4/5 stars |

Carnets de scène (Eng: Memories) is an album recorded by the French artist Patricia Kaas. It was her first live album, and her third album overall. Recorded during the Scène de vie tour, Kaas' first concerts tour, and released in 1991, the album was successful, particularly in France, and was also re-issued as DVD in 2004.

== Background ==
After the huge success of her first two studio albums, Kaas decided to perform a series of concerts across the world : the Scène de vie tour. There were 210 concerts, 650,000 spectators in 13 countries, including Japan, Canada and the USSR, where she sang in Moscow and Leningrad. It was recorded across two days between May 12 and 19, 1990, at Zénith of Paris (France).

The album contains many songs from Mademoiselle chante... and Scène de vie, plus a few new songs, such as "Lily Marlène". The hits "Mademoiselle chante le blues" and "Quand Jimmy dit" were performed in an extended version. The original double CD included 20 tracks; the single CD issue includes the 16 tracks listed below.

About 13 years later, the label Sony BMG also published the album as a live DVD.

== Chart performances ==
The CD went straight to #8, its peak position, on December 6, 1991, on the French SNEP Albums Chart. It remained for only two weeks in the top ten and 16 weeks in the top 40. It achieved double gold four years after its release.

The album was less successful in Germany (#53) and Switzerland (#40), where it stayed in the low positions.

== Track listing ==
CD

| # | Title | Length |
|---|---|---|
| 1. | "Générique (Thème Montmajour" (François Bernheim) | 2:04 |
| 2. | "Les Mannequins d'osier" (Didier Barbelivien / F. Bernheim) | 3:49 |
| 3. | "Venus des abribus" (F. Bernheim - Élisabeth Depardieu / Dominique Perrier) | 3:49 |
| 4. | "Mon mec à moi" (D. Barbelivien / F. Bernheim) | 5:02 |
| 5. | "Cœurs brisés" (Thierry Delianis / Charles France) | 3:31 |
| 6. | "L'Heure du jazz" (Jean-Claude Collo / F. Bernheim - D. Barbelivien) | 4:28 |
| 7. | "Lili Marlène" (Hans Leip / Norbert Schultze) | 1:03 |
| 8. | "D'Allemagne" (D. Barbelivien / F. Bernheim) | 3:40 |
| 9. | "Summertime" (DuBose Heyward / George Gershwin) | 2:35 |
| 10. | "Kennedy Rose" (E. Depardieu / D. Barbelivien - F. Bernheim) | 3:40 |
| 11. | "Mademoiselle chante le blues" (D. Barbelivien - Bob Mehdi / D. Barbelivien) | 7:58 |
| 12. | "Bessie" (Pierre Grosz / Franck Langolff) | 4:46 |
| 13. | "Les hommes qui passent" (D.Barbelivien / F.Bernheim) | 4:56 |
| 14. | "Une Dernière Semaine à New York" (D. Barbelivien / F. Bernheim) | 3:42 |
| 15. | "Quand Jimmy dit" (D.Barbelivien - F. Bernheim / D. Barbelivien) | 7:34 |
| 16. | "Un Dernier Blues" (D. Barbelivien) | 2:04 |

DVD

Same track listing

== Personnel ==
- Management : Talent Sorcier (Cyril Prieur, Richard Walter)
- Production : Gérard Drouot productions, Note de blues
- Production director : Jean-Hugues Feugeas
- Musical direction : Claude Samard, Patriciens and her vocalists
- Bass, percussion : Noël Assolo
- Bass, saxophone : Philippe Gonnand
- Guitar : Jean-Pierre Taieb
- Drum kit : Jean-Claude Givoine (+ electronic drum kit), Christophe Deschamps, Pascal Reva
- Keyboards : Benoît Sourisse (+ harmonica), Michel Amsellem, Yves Ottino
- Background vocals : Slim Batteux, Jacques Mercier
- Sound engineer and mixing : Bruno Lambert
- Artistic production : Jean-Jacques Souplet
- Recorded at Studio Le Voyageur II
- Mixed at Studio Marcadet
- Photo on the cover : Bernard Levy
- Photos in the booklet : B.Auger, F.Garcia, C.Gassian, B.Leloup, B.Levy, M.Marizi, Naoki, B.Pierrat, P.Riedinger, S.Rubinstein, P.Terrasson, F.Vernhet, X
- Design : Antonietti, Pascault & Ass.

== Charts ==
=== Weekly charts ===
Weekly chart performance for Carnets de scène
| Chart (1991–1992) | Peak position |
|---|---|
| Dutch Albums (Album Top 100) | 100 |
| European Albums (Music & Media) | 39 |
| French Albums (SNEP) | 8 |
| German Albums (Offizielle Top 100) | 53 |
| Swiss Albums (Schweizer Hitparade) | 40 |

=== Year-end charts ===
Year-end chart performance for Carnets de scène
| Chart (1991) | Position |
|---|---|
| French Albums (SNEP) | 69 |

== Certifications and sales ==
| Region | Certification | Certified units/sales |
|---|---|---|
| France (SNEP) | 2× Gold | 200,000^{*} |
^{*} Sales figures based on certification alone.
