= Recreation (disambiguation) =

Recreation is an activity of leisure, one that is pursued for enjoyment or pleasure.

Recreation may also refer to:

== Entertainment ==
- Recreation (film), a 1914 film
- RéCréation, a 1999 album by Florent Pagny

=== Television episodes ===
- "Recreation", a 1996 episode of Wing Commander Academy
- "Recreation", a 2004 episode of Joan of Arcadia

== Literature ==
- Recreation, a 1920 non-fiction work by Edward Grey, 1st Viscount Grey of Fallodon
- Recreation, a 2013 novel by Sue Orr

== Places ==
- Ballywalter Recreation F.C., a Northern Ireland football club
- Comber Recreation F.C., a Northern Ireland football club
- Dunmurry Recreation F.C., a Northern Ireland football club
- Kilmore Recreation F.C., a Northern Ireland football club
