= Châtelet Les Halles (album) =

Studio album by Florent Pagny
- Released: 7 November 2000
- Genre: Pop
- Label: Mercury, Universal Music

Florent Pagny chronology
RéCréation (1999)	Châtelet Les Halles (2000)	2 (2001)

Singles from Châtelet Les Halles
- 1. "Et un jour, une femme" Released: October 2000; 2. "Châtelet Les Halles" Released: February 2001; 3. "Terre" Released: September 2001

Châtelet Les Halles (French pronunciation: [ʃatlɛ le al]) is a 2000 album recorded by French singer Florent Pagny. It was his sixth studio album and his eighth album overall. Released on 7 November 2000, it achieved huge success in France, remaining on the charts for 80 weeks, including a peak at the top for one week. It was also successful in Belgium (Wallonia). It provided three singles, but a sole top ten hit: "Et un jour, une femme" (#5 in France, #2 in Belgium), "Châtelet Les Halles" (#45 in France) and "Terre" (#37 in France). French singers Calogero, Pascal Obispo, David Hallyday and Art Mengo participated in the writing or the composing of at least one song of the album.

== Track listing ==
1. "Châtelet les Halles" (Lionel Florence) — 5:08
2. "Comment je saurai" (Golemanas, Seff) — 4:55
3. "Y'a pas un homme qui soit né pour ça" (Florence, Guirao, Pascal Obispo) — 3:58
4. "Un mot de Prévert" (Falcao, Florence, Marie, Melville) — 3:25
5. "L'Air du temps" (Calogero, Florence) — 3:35
6. "Les Ombres" (Chemouny, Hallyday) — 4:19
7. "La Solitude" (Presgurvic) — 5:05
8. "Et un jour, une femme" (Florence, Obispo) — 5:20
9. "Dix Choses" (Esteve, Art Mengo) — 4:05
10. "Terre" (Dupont, Marrier, Raffaëlli) — 4:18
11. "Le temps joue contre nous" (Hampartzoumian, Veneruso) — 4:12
12. "La Légende de Carlos Gardel" (Chemouny, Hallyday) — 4:48
13. "Quelques Mots" (Hampartzoumian, Veneruso) — 3:41

Source : Allmusic.

== Charts ==
Chart (2000–2002)	Peak position
Belgian (Wallonia) Albums Chart	3
French SNEP Albums Chart	1
Swiss Albums Chart	16

End of year chart (2000)	Position
Belgian (Wallonia) Albums Chart	36
French Albums Chart	14
End of year chart (2001)	Position
French Albums Chart	34
Belgian (Wallonia) Albums Chart	38
End of year chart (2002)	Position
French Albums Chart	106

== Certifications and sales ==
Region	Certification	Certified units/sales
Belgium (BRMA)	Gold	25,000^{*}
France (SNEP)	2× Platinum	600,000^{*}
Switzerland (IFPI Switzerland)	Gold	25,000^{^}
^{*} Sales figures based on certification alone.^{^} Shipments figures based on certification alone.

== Releases ==
Date	Label	Country	Format	Catalog
2000	Universal Music	Belgium, France, Switzerland	CD	548315
2000	Polygram	Belgium, France, Switzerland	CD	5483152
