= Les hommes qui passent =

Single by Patricia Kaas

from the album Scène de vie
- B-side: "Tropic Blues Bar"
- Released: April 1990
- Recorded: Studio Marcadet, Paris
- Genre: Pop
- Length: 3:46
- Label: Sony Music, CBS Records
- Songwriters: Didier Barbelivien; François Bernheim
- Producer: Jean-Jacques Souplet

Patricia Kaas singles chronology
"Quand Jimmy dit" (1989)	"Les hommes qui passent" (1990)	"Les Mannequins d'osier" (1990)

"Les hommes qui passent" is a 1990 song recorded by the French singer Patricia Kaas. It was her first single from her second studio album, Scène de vie, on which it features as sixth track, and her seventh single overall. It was released in April 1990 and became a top ten hit in France.

== Song information ==
After the huge success of her debut album, Mademoiselle chante..., still well placed on the French album charts, Kaas decided to release her second studio album, Scène de vie, which was mainly written by the famous composer Didier Barbelivien. The lead single, "Les hommes qui passent", was released at the same time as the album, in April 1990. Written by Didier Barbelivien, the music was composed by François Bernheim.

The music video is in black and white. In the lyrics, the narrator, explains to her mother how men whom she dates behave and what they bring her at the material level. However, she expresses her desire to know love and keep a man only for her for a long period of time.

The song was part of Kaas's concerts tours in 1990, 1994 and 1998, and thus is available in a live version on the albums Carnets de scène, Tour de charme and Rendez-vous. The song also features on the best of Rien ne s'arrête and Ma Liberté contre la tienne, and on the French compilation Les Plus Belles Victoires de la Musique.

"Les hommes qui passent" was covered at first by Oya Bora (then Grup Denk), who is a Turkish group and consists from Oya Küçümen and Bora Ebeoğlu, in Turkish language under the title "Şu Adamlar Anne" ("These guys mother") in Tiryaki ("Addicted") album in 1990 as 2nd track, and later by Haris Alexiou in Greek-language under the title of "I andres pernoun mama (les hommes qui passent)". This version is available on her 2006 best of Anthology (CD 1, 18th track).

== Chart performance ==
"Les hommes qui passent" entered the French Singles Chart at number 27 on the edition of 28 April 1990, climbed and reached the top ten in the fifth week, and remained there for five consecutive weeks including a peak at number seven, thus becoming Kaas' fourth top ten. It fell off the chart after 16 weeks of presence.

On the European Hot 100, it debuted at number 82 on 12 May 1990, then rose to number 40 and peaked at number 35 in its seven week, and diseappered from the chart after its 14th week. It also started at number 38 on the European Airplay Top 50 on 5 May 1990, reached a peak of number 17 in its fourth week and totalled eight weeks on the chart.

== Track listings ==
- 7" single
1. "Les hommes qui passent" — 3:46
2. "Tropic Blues Bar" — 4:00
- CD single
1. "Les hommes qui passent" — 3:46
2. "Tropic Blues Bar" — 4:00
- Cassette
1. "Les hommes qui passent" — 3:46
2. "Tropic Blues Bar" — 4:00
- 7" single - Promo
1. "Les hommes qui passent" — 3:46

== Charts ==
Weekly chart performance for "Les hommes qui passent"
Chart (1990)	Peak position
Europe (European Airplay Top 50)	17
Europe (European Hot 100)	35
France (SNEP)	7
Quebec (ADISQ)	6
