= Y. Pierre Gobin =

American neuroscientist (born 1957)

Y. Pierre Gobin, MD
- Occupation: neurosurgeon
- Known for: Research in neuroscience & neurosurgery
- Scientific career
- Fields: Physician & Neurosurgeon
- Workplaces: Weill Medical College; New York Presbyterian Medical Center

Y. Pierre Gobin (born 1957) is a French-born American physician who specializes in interventional neuroradiology and endovascular treatment of cerebral aneurysms. He is one of the inventors of the Concentric MERCI Retriever, a device for removing blood clots in the brain that cause stroke.

== Academic and clinical appointments ==
Gobin is the director of Interventional Neuroradiology at New York-Presbyterian Hospital Weill Cornell Medical Center and professor of radiology in neurological surgery at Weill Cornell Medical College.

== Education ==
Gobin completed his medical degree, internship and radiology residency at the University of Paris, France in 1988. He trained in interventional neuroradiology at Hospital Lariboisiere in Paris, where he performed the first Guglielmi Detachable Coil (GDC) embolization in France, in a patient with a cerebral aneurysm.

== Professional history ==
At UCLA, Gobin was part of the team that invented a new device to remove blood clots from the brain that cause ischemic stroke. The device was conceived in 1995 after a frustrating experience in the operating room in which surgeons were unable to reopen a blood vessel blocked by a clot. In 1999 Gobin became Medical Director of the newly founded Concentric Medical, where he continued his development of the device. The device, which by then had been named the Mechanical Embolus Removal in Cerebral Ischemia, or MERCI for short, received FDA approval in 2004.

In 2001, Gobin became professor of radiology in neurosurgery and neurology at the Weill Cornell Medical College and director of Interventional Neuroradiology at the New York-Presbyterian Hospital Weill Cornell Medical Center.

Gobin is the author of many articles and reviews pertaining to interventional neuroradiology.
