= 2 (Florent Pagny album) =

Studio album by Florent Pagny
- Released: 17 December 2001
- Genre: Pop
- Label: Mercury, Universal Music

Florent Pagny chronology
Châtelet Les Halles (1999)	2 (2001)	Ailleurs land (2003)

Singles from 2
- 1. "L'air du temps" Released: 1 February 2002

2 is a 2001 album recorded by French singer Florent Pagny. It was his seventh studio album and was released on December 17, 2001. It achieved success in France and Belgium (Wallonia), where it hit #3, and in Switzerland where it peaked at #8. This album is composed of cover versions of popular songs in French or English, and covers of Pagny's previous songs, but as the title suggests, these songs were overdubbed as duets with many notable artists such as David Hallyday, Calogero, Pascal Obispo and Patrick Bruel. It provided a sole single, "L'air du temps", recorded with Cécilia Cara, which was #20 in France and #19 in Belgium (Wallonia).

== Track listing ==
No.	Title	Writer(s)	Duet Partner	Length
1.	"We Are the Champions"	Freddie Mercury	David Hallyday	3:30
2.	"Et maintenant"	Gilbert Bécaud, Pierre Delanoë	Lara Fabian	4:14
3.	"L'Air du temps"	Lionel Florence, Calogero Bros.	Cécilia Cara	3:29
4.	"On n'oublie pas d'où l'on vient"	L. Florence, Marie-Jo Zarb, Pascal Obispo	Pascal Obispo	4:24
5.	"Les Emmerdes"	Charles Aznavour	Patrick Bruel	3:01
6.	"Chanter"	L. Florence, P. Obispo	Isabelle Boulay	3:46
7.	"Terre"	Patrick Dupont, Jean-Marie Marrier, Benjamin Raffaelli	Axel Bauer	4:13
8.	"La Poupée qui fait non"	Michel Polnareff, Franck Gérald	Kad	3:58
9.	"Châtelet les Halles"	L. Florence, Calogero Bros.	Calogero	5:02
10.	"Pas de boogie woogie"	Layng Martine Jr.	Eddy Mitchell	4:22
11.	"Et un jour, une femme"	L. Florence, P. Obispo	Marc Lavoine	4:54
12.	"Là-bas"	Jean-Jacques Goldman	Natasha St-Pier	5:06
13.	"L'Eau"	Daran, Alana Filippi	Daran	4:08
14.	"Savoir aimer"	L. Florence, P. Obispo	Souad Massi	4:09
15.	"Con te partirò"	Lucio Quarantotto, Francesco Sartori		4:29

Source : Allmusic.

== Charts ==
Chart (2001–2003)	Peak position
Belgian (Wallonia) Albums Chart	3
French SNEP Albums Chart	3
Swiss Albums Chart	8

End of year chart (2001)	Position
French Albums Chart	52
End of year chart (2002)	Position
Belgian (Wallonia) Albums Chart	56
French Albums Chart	37
Swiss Singles Chart	84

== Certifications ==
Country	Certification	Date	Sales certified	Physical sales
Belgium	Gold	2002	25,000	
France	2 x Gold	December 19, 2001	200,000	452,000
Switzerland	Gold	2002	20,000	

== Release history ==
Date	Label	Country	Format	Catalog
2001	Universal Music	Belgium, France, Switzerland	CD	586604
2002	Polygram	Belgium, France, Switzerland	CD	5866042
2003	EMI International	Belgium, France, Switzerland	CD	5866042
