= N'importe quoi =

Single by Florent Pagny
- B-side: "Je resterai là"
- Released: March 1988
- Recorded: 1987
- Studio: Musika Studios, Studio du Palais des Congrès (Paris)
- Genre: Pop
- Length: 3:50
- Label: Pêche, Philips
- Songwriter(s): Florent Pagny, Marion Vernoux
- Producer(s): Jean-Yves d'Angelo, Hugues Dumas, Kamil Rustam

Florent Pagny singles chronology
| "N'importe quoi" (1988) | "Laissez-nous respirer" (1988) |

"N'importe quoi" (French pronunciation: [nɛ̃pɔʁt kwa]) is the name of a 1987 song recorded by the French artist Florent Pagny. It was his debut single, released in March 1988. It became a big hit in France, topping the chart for two months and is Pagny's second best-selling single in terms of charts and sales, after "Savoir aimer".

== Background and writing ==
After several appearances in films, Pagny decided to record his first single, "N'importe quoi". He composed the music, while he and Marion Vernoux wrote the lyrics. The song deals with the themes of drugs and alcohol; in this protest song, the narrator addresses a friend, trying to make him think about the dangers of these substances. The music video was filmed under a circus tent.

== Other versions ==
Pagny performed "N'importe quoi" during his 2003 tour, and thus features on his 2004 live album Été 2003 à l'Olympia, as eighth track. The song was also included on Pagny's best of Les 50 Plus Belles Chansons, released in 2008, and on the French compilation Les 100 Plus Belles Chansons. IT was covered by Les Enfoirés on their album 2011: Dans l'œil des Enfoirés. The song was performed by Christophe Maé, Patricia Kaas, Amel Bent and Jean-Jacques Goldman.

== Critical reception ==
A review in Music & Media presented "N'importe quoi" as a "passionate and dramatic rock song in a rather pompous, 'full-blown' setting".

== Chart performance ==
In France, "N'importe quoi" it started at number 48 on the chart edition of 12 March 1988, climbed quickly and reached the top ten in its fifth week. It topped the chart for eight consecutive weeks, dislodging Glenn Medeiros's hit "Nothing's Gonna Change My Love for You", then almost did not stop to drop on the chart and totaled 16 weeks in the top ten and 26 weeks in the top 50. It achieved silver status awarded by the Syndicat National de l'Édition Phonographique, thus becoming Pagny's second most successful single, only beaten by his 1998 huge hit "Savoir aimer". On the European Hot 100 Singles, it debuted at number 72 on 9 April 1988 and reached a peak of number two for three weeks.

== Track listings ==
- 7" single
1. "N'importe quoi" — 3:50
2. "Je resterai là" (Florent Pagny/Jean-Yves D'Angelo/Manu Katché/Kamil Rustam) — 3:30
- 12" maxi
1. "N'importe quoi" (maxi version) — 5:25
2. "N'importe quoi" — 3:50
3. "Je resterai là" — 3:30
- Digital download
1. "N'importe quoi" — 3:50
2. "N'importe quoi" (2004 live version) — 5:16

== Credits ==
Production

- Arranged & produced by Jean-Yves D'Angelo, Hugues Dumas & Kamil Rustam
- Engineered by Guillaume Coulon at Musika Studios, Paris
- Mixed at Studio du Palais des Congrès, Paris

Design

- Corinne Bertelot — photography
- Virginie Demachy — design

== Charts ==
=== Weekly charts ===
| Chart (1988) | Peak position |
|---|---|
| Belgium (Ultratop 50 Wallonia) | 2 |
| Europe (European Hot 100) | 2 |
| France (SNEP) | 1 |
| Quebec (ADISQ) | 15 |

=== Year-end charts ===
| Chart (1988) | Position |
|---|---|
| Europe (European Hot 100) | 16 |

== Certifications ==
Certifications for "N'importe quoi"
| Region | Certification | Certified units/sales |
|---|---|---|
| France (SNEP) | Gold | 800,000 |

== See also ==
- List of number-one singles of 1988 (France)
