= Merci (Florent Pagny album) =

Studio album by Florent Pagny
- Released: May 1990
- Genre: Pop
- Label: Philips

Florent Pagny chronology
| Merci (1990) | Réaliste (1992) |

Singles from Merci
- 1. "J'te jure" Released: April 1990; 2. "Ça fait des nuits" Released: July 1990; 3. "Presse qui roule" Released: December 1990; 4. "Prends ton temps" Released: May 1991

Merci (French pronunciation: [mɛʁsi]) is a 1990 album recorded by French singer Florent Pagny. It was his first studio album and was released on May 1, 1990. The album was a success in France, where it remained in the top 50 for 44 weeks, including two weeks at #10. It was entirely written by the singer himself and contains several songs deemed controversial at the time, such as "Presse qui roule", which is critical of press. The album provided four singles which were moderately successful in France: "J'te jure" (#16), "Ça fait des nuits" (#17), "Presse qui roule" (#24) and "Prends ton temps" (#42).

== Track listing ==
1. "Merci" (Pagny) — 4:16
2. "Ça fait des nuits" (Pagny) — 3:57
3. "J'te jure" (D'Angelo, Pagny, Kamil Rustam) — 4:26
4. "On est juste de passage" (D'Angelo, Pagny, Kamil Rustam) — 4:40
5. "Questions sans réponse" (D'Angelo, Pagny, Kamil Rustam) — 3:59
6. "Reste chez toi" (D'Angelo, Pagny, Kamil Rustam) — 3:39
7. "Pour la vie" (Pagny) — 4:01
8. "Prends ton temps" (Langolff, Pagny) — 3:50
9. "Emergency" (Nevil, Pagny, Walsh, Warren) — 3:56
10. "Presse qui roule" (Pagny) — 4:43
11. "Heureux de vivre" (Meunier, Pagny) — 3:40

Source : Allmusic.

== Charts ==
| Chart (1990–1991) | Peak position |
|---|---|
| French SNEP Albums Chart | 10 |

== Certifications and sales ==
| Region | Certification | Certified units/sales |
|---|---|---|
| France (SNEP) | Gold | 100,000^{*} |
^{*} Sales figures based on certification alone.

== Releases ==
| Date | Label | Country | Format | Catalog |
|---|---|---|---|---|
| 1990 | Philips | Belgium, France, Switzerland | CD | 8427492 |
