= Mon mec à moi =

Single by Patricia Kaas

from the album Mademoiselle chante...
- B-side: "Chanson d'amour pas finie"; "Un dernier blues"
- Released: November 1988
- Recorded: Studio CBE, Paris
- Genre: Pop
- Length: 4:16
- Label: BSO, Polydor, PolyGram
- Songwriters: Didier Barbelivien (lyrics); François Bernheim (music)
- Producer: Bernard Estardy

Patricia Kaas singles chronology
"D'Allemagne" (1988)	"Mon mec à moi" (1988)	"Elle voulait jouer cabaret" (1989)

"Mon mec à moi" is a song recorded by the French singer Patricia Kaas. It was the third single from her debut studio album, Mademoiselle chante..., on which it features as the opening track, and her fourth single overall. Released in November 1988, it was Kaas' first top five hit in France, which remains her best peak position on the French Singles Chart.

== Song information ==
After the success of the two previous singles, "Mademoiselle chante le blues" and "D'Allemagne", which had preceded the album release, Kaas release what was really the first single from Mademoiselle chante..., "Mon mec à moi" (Eng: That guy of mine). The lyrics were written by Didier Barbelivien and the music composed by François Bernheim. In the song, the narrator talks about her boyfriend, who tells her many lies in which she chooses to believe because she loves him.

"Mon mec à moi" has become a "real popular success" throughout the years.

The song was performed during Kaas' concert tours in 1991, 1994 and 1998, and was thus included on the live albums Carnets de scène, Tour de charme and Rendez-vous respectively as well as the singer's best of compilations Rien ne s'arrête and Ma Liberté contre la tienne in a live version.

== Chart performance ==
In France, "Mon mec à moi" debuted on the singles chart at number 28 on 3 December 1988 and after fluctuating for a few weeks, entered the top ten on 21 January 1989. It peaked at number five in its tenth week – Kaas' highest position on the French Singles Chart, a record also held by her 1993 single "Il me dit que je suis belle" – and after spending a total of four consecutive weeks inside the top ten, dropped out of top 50 after 18 weeks. It was certified silver by the Syndicat National de l'Édition Phonographique. On the Eurochart Hot 100 Singles, it debuted at number 80 on 17 December 1988 and peaked at number 26 in its seventh week, spending in total 15 weeks on the chart. It also charted for two weeks on the European Airplay Top 50, peaking at number 46.

== Track listings ==
- CD single
1. "Mon mec à moi" — 4:11
2. "Chanson d'amour pas finie" — 1:37
3. "Un Dernier Blues" — 1:35
- 7" single
1. "Mon mec à moi" — 4:11
2. "Chanson d'amour pas finie" — 1:37
3. "Un Dernier Blues" — 1:35
- Digital download
1. "Mon mec à moi" — 4:14
2. "Mon mec à moi" (1990 live version) — 5:02
3. "Mon mec à moi" (1994 live version) — 5:04
4. "Mon mec à moi" (1998 live version) — 5:18

== Credits ==
- Gilles Cappé - photography
- Bernard Estardy - producer
- Alain Frappier - design

== Charts and certifications ==
=== Weekly charts ===
Weekly chart performance for "Mon mec à moi"
Chart (1988–1989)	Peak position
Europe (European Airplay Top 50)	46
Europe (European Hot 100)	26
France (SNEP)	5
Quebec (ADISQ)	5

=== Certifications ===
Certifications for "Mon mec à moi"
Region	Certification	Certified units/sales
France (SNEP)	Silver	200,000^{*}
^{*} Sales figures based on certification alone.
