= Love Songs (Julio Iglesias album) =

Compilation album by Julio Iglesias
- Released: 2004
- Genre: Soft rock

Love Songs is an English language compilation of mainly love songs by Julio Iglesias released in 2004. It contains his greatest English language hit - his duet with Willie Nelson on "To All The Girls I've Loved Before" which reached the top 5 of the Billboard Hot 100. It also features a duet with Dolly Parton on "When You Tell Me You Love Me" as well as a live version of "As Time Goes By" from Casablanca. Iglesias departs from the love song theme on the album with a version of Don McLean's "Vincent" ("Starry Starry Night").

== Track listing ==
1. "To All the Girls I've Loved Before"
2. "Crazy"
3. "When I Need You"
4. "Vincent" ("Starry Starry Night")
5. "And I Love Her"
6. "Feelings" (Live)
7. "If You Go Away"
8. "Crazy In Love"
9. "When I Fall In Love"
10. "Can't Help Falling In Love"
11. "As Time Goes By" (Live)
12. "Moonlight Lady"
13. "When You Tell Me That You Love Me"
14. "Mona Lisa"
15. "99 Miles from L.A."
16. "Love Has Been A Friend To Me"

== Sales and certifications ==
Region	Certification	Certified units/sales
New Zealand (RMNZ)	Gold	7,500^{^}
Norway (IFPI Norway)	Gold	20,000^{*}
Spain (Promusicae)	Gold	50,000^{^}
^{*} Sales figures based on certification alone.^{^} Shipments figures based on certification alone.
