= Baryton. Gracias a la vida =

Studio album by Florent Pagny
- Released: October 2012

Florent Pagny chronology
Tout et son contraire (2010)	Baryton. Gracias a la vida (2012)	Ma liberté de chanter - Live Acoustic (2012)

Baryton. Gracias a la vida is an album of French singer Florent Pagny released in October 2012. This album makes a series with Baryton, released 8 years before, in 2004. All the songs are cover songs of famous Latin music songs (tangos, boleros, ...)

== Track listing ==
1. El Día Que Me Quieras 04:05; writer: Alfredo Le Pera; composer: Carlos Gardel (1935).
2. La Soledad 03:35. Pink Martini's song (composer: Thomas M. Lauderdale; introduction: Chopin's prelude)
3. Gracias a la Vida 03:47; nueva cancion; writer/composer: Violeta Parra. interprets: Mercedes Sosa, Joan Baez...
4. Quizás 02:55 (Quizas Quizas Quizas); Cuban bolero; writer/composer: Osvaldo Farrés (1947); interprets: Nat King Cole (in English: Perhaps, Perhaps, Perhaps), Luis Mariano (in French: Qui sait qui sait qui sait), Abdelhakim Garani (in Arab : Chehilet laayami)!
5. Alfonsina y el mar 05:03 (zamba); Composer: Ariel Ramírez; Writer: Félix Luna a.k.a. "Falucho"; dédicated to Alfonsina Storni; interprets: Mercedes Sosa, Nana Mouskouri, Maurane, ...
6. A La Huella A La Huella 02:58 (a.k.a. "La Peregrinacion"); villancico (Christmas song); composer: Ariel Ramírez; writer: Félix Luna
7. Piensa en Mi 04:09; Mexican bolero (1937); Composer: Agustín Lara; interprets : Luz Casal, ...
8. Un vestido y un amor 04:21: writer/composer: Rodolfo "Fito" Páez. interprets : Mercedes Sosa
9. Volver 04:10; tango; Writer: Alfredo Le Pera; interprets : Carlos Gardel, ....
10. Clandestino 03:38; Manu Chao. interprets : Adriana Calcanhotto.
11. Los Años 03:09; interprets : Rocío Dúrcal

== Charts ==
=== Weekly charts ===
Chart (2012)	Peak position
Belgian Albums (Ultratop Flanders)	176
Belgian Albums (Ultratop Wallonia)	5
French Albums (SNEP)	2
Swiss Albums (Schweizer Hitparade)	40

=== Year-end charts ===
Chart (2012)	Position
Belgian Albums (Ultratop Wallonia)	57
French Albums (SNEP)	42

Chart (2013)	Position
Belgian Albums (Ultratop Wallonia)	197
French Albums (SNEP)	198
