= Savoir aimer (album) =

Studio album by Florent Pagny
- Released: 1 November 1997
- Recorded: 1997
- Studio: Méga West, Suresnes; Studio Guillaume Tell, Suresnes; Studio Davout, Paris; Studio Atletico, Paris; Studio Méga, Paris
- Genre: Pop
- Label: Mercury, Polygram
- Producer: Erick Benzi, Pascal Obispo

Florent Pagny chronology
| Bienvenue chez moi (1995) | Savoir aimer (1997) | En concert (1998) |

Singles from Savoir aimer
- 1. "Savoir aimer" Released: October 1997; 2. "Chanter" Released: February 1998; 3. "D'un amour l'autre" Released: July 1998; 4. "Dors" Released: September 1998

Professional ratings
Review scores
| Source | Rating |
|---|---|
| Allmusic | 3/5 stars |

Savoir aimer is a 1997 album recorded by French singer Florent Pagny. It was his fifth album oversall and was released on 1 November 1997. It achieved huge success in France and Belgium (Wallonia), where it remained charted respectively for 84 and 64 weeks, including two weeks atop. To date it is Pagny's best-selling album, with over 1,5 million copies sold. It was led by the single "Savoir aimer", a number-one hit in both countries, and followed by "Chanter" (#16 in France, #15 in Belgium), "D'un amour l'autre" (#83 in France, limited edition) and "Dors" (#29 in France, #28 in Belgium). French artists Pascal Obispo, Zazie, Art Mengo and Jean-Jacques Goldman wrote at least one song of the album.

== Track listing ==
1. "Savoir aimer" (Lionel Florence, Pascal Obispo) — 4:40
2. "Dors" (Erick Benzi) — 3:58
3. "Sierra Cuadrada" (Jacques Veneruso) — 5:30
4. "Mourir les yeux ouverts" (Didier Golemanas, Obispo) — 4:13
5. "Loin de toi" (Veneruso) — 5:12
6. "Une place pour moi" (Benzi, Jean-Jacques Goldman, J. Kapler) — 4:17
7. "Protection" (Bruno Jardel, Peter Kingsberry, Dimitri Ticovoi) — 4:14
8. "Combien ça va" (Zazie) — 3:44
9. "Chanter" (Florence, Obispo) — 3:48
10. "Sólo le pido a Dios" (Léon Gieco) — 4:17
11. "D'un amour l'autre" (Patrice Guirao, Art Mengo) — 2:49

Source : Allmusic.

== Charts ==
| Chart (1997–1999) | Peak position |
|---|---|
| Belgian (Wallonia) Albums Chart | 1 |
| French SNEP Albums Chart | 1 |
| Swiss Albums Chart | 23 |

| End of year chart (1997) | Position |
|---|---|
| Belgian (Wallonia) Albums Chart | 3 |
| French Albums Chart | 6 |
| End of year chart (1998) | Position |
| Belgian (Wallonia) Albums Chart | 5 |
| French Albums Chart | 7 |

== Certifications and sales ==
| Region | Certification | Certified units/sales |
|---|---|---|
| Belgium (BRMA) | Platinum | 50,000^{*} |
| France (SNEP) | Diamond | 1,000,000^{*} |
| Switzerland (IFPI Switzerland) | 2× Platinum | 100,000^{^} |
^{*} Sales figures based on certification alone.^{^} Shipments figures based on certification alone.

== Releases ==
| Date | Label | Country | Format | Catalog |
|---|---|---|---|---|
| 1997 | Polygram | Belgium, France, Switzerland | CD | 53658820 |
