= Scène de vie =

Studio album by Patricia Kaas
- Released: April 9, 1990
- Recorded: Studio Guillaume Tell, Suresnes; Local Studio, Rueil-Malmaison; Studio Marcadet, Paris; Musika Studios, Paris
- Genre: Pop
- Length: 42:09
- Label: CBS Disques
- Producers: Bertrand Châtenet; Franck Langolff; Philippe Osman; Jean-Jacques Souplet

Patricia Kaas chronology
Mademoiselle chante... (1988)	Scène de vie (1990)	Carnets de scène (1991)

Singles from Scène de vie
- 1. "Les hommes qui passent" Released: April 1990; 2. "Les mannequins d'osier" Released: September 1990; 3. "Kennedy Rose" Released: January 1991; 4. "Regarde les riches" Released: June 1991

Alternative cover

Professional ratings
Review scores
Source	Rating
Allmusic	3/5 stars

Scène de vie (Eng: Moments in Life) is a studio album recorded by the French artist Patricia Kaas. It was her second album and was released in 1990. It confirmed the singer's potential, reaching the top of the albums chart in France.

== Background ==
In 1990, Kaas' first album, Mademoiselle chante..., was still well placed in the French charts. It was a huge success, and she decided to release a second album in order to consolidate her popularity. She left her former record company, Polydor, in order to join CBS/Sony. Cyril Prieur and Richard Walter from the firm 'Talent Sorcier' (Paris) replaced Bernard Schwartz and became her new managers. They both contributed significantly to the singer's success.

With her new record company, she produced her second studio album Scène de vie in 1990. As with the previous album, many tracks were composed by Barbelivien and Bernheim. With the song "Kennedy Rose" (dedicated to Rose Kennedy, matriarch of the Kennedy family and mother of former U.S. president John F. Kennedy), Kaas again worked with Elisabeth Depardieu and François Bernheim; this collaboration was more successful than "Jalouse", even if it did not chart highly.

In France, there were four singles from this album, but only the first reached the top ten: "Les hommes qui passent" (#7), "Les mannequins d'osier" (#21), "Kennedy Rose" (#36) and "Regarde les riches" (#27). They were not certified by the SNEP.

== Chart performances ==
In France, Scène de vie went to #2 on May 10, 1990, before reaching the top of the albums chart and staying there for ten weeks. It spent 38 weeks in the top ten and 78 in the top 50. It went Diamond disc eight years after its release, just as Mademoiselle chante... had done before it.

In Switzerland, the album entered the chart on May 6, 1990, at #17, and reached a peak position of #15. It remained on the chart for six weeks, then recharted for a further 16 weeks, from January 20 to May 5, 1991, entering the top 30 for eight weeks. It was certified double platinum in 1993.

The album also went platinum in Canada, after being gold on March 28, 1991.

== Track listing ==
#	Title	Length
1.	"Générique (Thème Montmajour)" (François Bernheim)	0:52
2.	"Les mannequins d'osier" (Didier Barbelivien, Bernheim)	3:52
3.	"L'Heure du jazz" (Barbelivien, Bernheim, Jean-François Collo)	3:56
4.	"Où vont les cœurs brisés" (Charles France, Thierry Delianis)	3:21
5.	"Regarde les riches" (Barbelivien, Bernheim)	3:39
6.	"Les hommes qui passent" (Barbelivien, Bernheim)	3:45
7.	"Bessie" (Pierre Grosz, Franck Langolff)	4:08
8.	"Tropic Blues Bar" (Joëlle Kopf, Jerry Lipkins)	4:00
9.	"L'Enterrement de Sidney Bechet" (Barbelivien, Bernheim)	3:04
10.	"Kennedy Rose" (Barbelivien, Bernheim, Élisabeth Depardieu)	3:17
11.	"Une derniere semaine à New York" (Barbelivien, Bernheim)	2:58
12.	"Patou Blues" (Barbelivien, Bernheim)	3:51
13.	"Generique (orchestral)" (Bernheim)	0:53

== Album credits ==
- Antonietti, Pascault & Associés - design
- Slim Batteux - backing vocals
- François Bernheim - backing vocals
- Patrick Bourgoin - saxophone
- Ann Calvert - backing vocals
- André Ceccarelli - drums
- Jean-Paul Celea - double bass
- Bertrand Châtenet - arranger, engineer, producer
- Jean-Yves D'Angelo - arranger, organ, piano
- Guy Delacroix - bass guitar
- Alain Duplantier - photography
- Thierry Durbet - arranger
- Bruno Fourrier - engineer
- Pierre Gossez - soprano saxophone
- Jérôme Gueguen - piano, synthesizer
- Bruno Lambert - engineer, mixing

- Franck Langolff - arranger, producer
- Renaud Letang - assistant engineer
- Sophie Masson - assistant engineer
- Jacques Mercier - backing vocals
- Jean-Jacques Milteau - harmonica
- Philippe Osman - arranger, guitar, programming, producer, synthesizer
- André Perriat - mastering
- Cyril Prieur - management
- Jacques Romensky - assistant engineer & mixing
- Serge Roux - saxophone
- Tony Russo - trumpet
- Kamil Rustam - arranger, guitar
- Claude Salmiéri - drums
- Claude Samard - arranger, guitar
- Jean-Jacques Souplet - producer
- Richard Walter - management

== Charts ==
=== Weekly charts ===
Weekly chart performance for Scène de vie
Chart (1990–1992)	Peak position
European Albums (Music & Media)	20
French Albums (SNEP)	1
German Albums (Offizielle Top 100)	18
Russian Albums (Moskovskij Komsomolets)	1
Swiss Albums (Schweizer Hitparade)	15
US World Albums (Billboard)	7

=== Year-end charts ===
1990 year-end chart performance for Scène de vie
Chart (1990)	Position
French Albums (SNEP)	2

1991 year-end chart performance for Scène de vie
Chart (1991)	Position
German Albums (Offizielle Top 100)	41

== Certifications and sales ==
Region	Certification	Certified units/sales
Austria	—	90,000
Belgium (BRMA)	Platinum	50,000^{*}
Canada (Music Canada)	Platinum	100,000^{^}
France (SNEP)	Diamond	1,000,000^{*}
Germany (BVMI)	Gold	250,000^{^}
Japan	—	25,000
Russia	—	300,000
Switzerland (IFPI Switzerland)	2× Platinum	100,000^{^}
United States	—	25,000
Summaries
Worldwide	—	2,200,000
^{*} Sales figures based on certification alone.^{^} Shipments figures based on certification alone.
