= Abracadabra (Florent Pagny album) =

Studio album by Florent Pagny
- Released: April 18, 2006
- Genre: Pop
- Label: Mercury
- Producer: Erik Fostinelli, Alexandra Cubizolles

Florent Pagny chronology
Baryton – L'intégrale du spectacle (2005)	Abracadabra (2006)	Pagny chante Brel (2007)

Singles from Abracadabra
- 1. "Là où je t'emmènerai" Released: June 2006

Abracadabra is a 2006 album recorded by French singer Florent Pagny. It was his tenth studio album and was on April 18, 2006. It achieved huge success in France and Belgium (Wallonia) where it remained charted respectively for 66 and 22 weeks, including a peak at #2. It provided a sole hit single, "Là où je t'emmènerai" (#4 in France, #7 in Belgium, #39 in Switzerland). There is also an edition including a DVD released on November 13, 2006, under Universal Music label.

== Track listing ==
CD

1. "Le Mur" (Daran, Fostinelli, Lebert) — 4:26
2. "Je suis" (Cosso, Daran, Fostinelli, Janois, Rousseau) — 3:52
3. "Là où je t'emmènerai" (Daran, Vga) — 4:05
4. "Comme l'eau se souvient" (Haroche, Manset) — 3:21
5. "Désolé" (Cahen, Daran, Fostinelli, Grillet) — 3:02
6. "Ça change un homme" (Darren, Miossec) — 3:39
7. "Vivons la paix" (Alhister, Daran, Fostinelli, Puccino, Ricour) (duet with Marie-Pascale Giunta) — 4:25
8. "J'ai beau vouloir" (Cosso, Daran) — 4:24
9. "Abracadabra" (Alhister, Cosso, Ricour) — 2:46
10. "Envers et contre moi" (Daran, Fostinelli, Hébrand, Janois, Tarlay) — 5:26
11. "À tout peser à bien choisir" (Guirao, Léopold, Soulier) — 5:49

DVD

Bonuses

Source : Allmusic.

== Personnel ==
- Florent Pagny – vocals
- Fabien Cahen – acoustic guitar
- Philippe Entressangle – percussion, drums
- Erik Fostinelli – percussion, clavier

=== Production ===
- René Ameline – engineer
- David Boucher – mixing
- Alexandra Cubizolles – assistant, production executive
- Jean-Paul Gonnod – engineer
- Bertrand Lamblot – artistic director
- Bob Ludwig – mastering

== Charts ==
Chart (2006–2007)	Peak position
Belgian (Wallonia) Albums Chart	2
French SNEP Albums Chart	2
Swiss Albums Chart	13

End of year chart (2006)	Position
Belgian (Wallonia) Albums Chart	9
French Albums Chart	14

== Certifications and sales ==
Region	Certification	Certified units/sales
Belgium (BRMA)	Gold	25,000^{*}
France (SNEP)	Platinum	200,000^{*}
Switzerland (IFPI Switzerland)	Gold	15,000^{^}
^{*} Sales figures based on certification alone.^{^} Shipments figures based on certification alone.

== Releases ==
Date	Label	Country	Format	Catalog
April 18, 2006	Universal Music	Belgium, France, Switzerland	CD	9839034
November 13, 2006	Universal Music	Belgium, France, Switzerland	DVD	98444368
