= RéCréation =

Studio album by Florent Pagny
- Released: October 26, 1999
- Recorded: France, 1999
- Genre: Pop
- Label: Mercury, Universal Music

Florent Pagny chronology
| Florent Pagny en concert (1998) | RéCréation (1999) | Châtelet Les Halles (1999) |

Singles from RéCréation
- 1. "Jolie môme" Released: September 1999; 2. "Les Parfums de sa vie (Je l'ai tant aimée)" Released: January 2000

RéCréation (French pronunciation: [ʁekʁeasjɔ̃]) is a 1999 double album recorded by French singer Florent Pagny. It was his fifth studio album and his seventh album overall. It was on October 26, 1999, and achieved success in France and Belgium (Wallonia), where it remained charted respectively for 21 and 24 weeks, including a peak at #1 and at #4. This album contains cover versions of various successful songs originally recorded by other artists. There were two singles from this album : "Jolie môme" (#13 in France, #11 in Belgium) and "Les Parfums de sa vie (Je l'ai tant aimée)" (#38 in France, #30 in Belgium).

== Track listing ==
=== CD 1 ===
1. "Les Parfums de sa vie (Je l'ai tant aimée)" (Guirao, Art Mengo) — 4:47
2. "Pars" (Jacques Higelin) — 4:24
3. "SOS amor" (Alain Bashung, Golemanas) — 4:54
4. "Requiem pour un con" (Colombier, Serge Gainsbourg) — 4:00
5. "Il voyage en solitaire" (Gérard Manset) — 3:44
6. "J'oublierai ton nom" (Jean-Jacques Goldman, Michael Jones) (duet with Ginie Line) — 4:20
7. "Jolie môme" (Léo Ferré) — 4:06
8. "Vendeurs de larmes" (Daniel Balavoine) — 4:38
9. "Hygiaphone" (Jean-Louis Aubert) — 3:05

=== CD 2 ===
1. "Quand j'étais chanteur" (Michel Delpech, Rivat, Vincent) — 4:29
2. "Une seule journée passée sans elle" (Michel Jonasz) — 4:23
3. "Heures hindoues" (Étienne Daho, Munday) — 3:58
4. "Chère amie (toutes mes excuses)" (Aboulker, Marc Lavoine) — 4:09
5. "Voilà c'est fini" (Guirao, Mengo) — 4:14
6. "Tu manques" (Goldman) — 7:10
7. "Partir" (Julien Clerc, Dabadie) — 4:14
8. "Antisocial" (Bernie Bonvoisin, Krieff) — 4:42

Source : Allmusic.

== Charts ==
| Chart (1999–2000) | Peak position |
|---|---|
| Belgian (Wallonia) Albums Chart | 4 |
| French SNEP Albums Chart | 1 |
| Swiss Albums Chart | 94 |

| End of year chart (1999) | Position |
|---|---|
| Belgian (Wallonia) Albums Chart | 42 |
| French Albums Chart | 33 |
| End of year chart (2000) | Position |
| Belgian (Wallonia) Albums Chart | 87 |

== Certifications and sales ==
| Region | Certification | Certified units/sales |
|---|---|---|
| Belgium (BRMA) | Gold | 25,000^{*} |
| France (SNEP) | Platinum | 300,000^{*} |
^{*} Sales figures based on certification alone.

== Releases ==
| Date | Label | Country | Format | Catalog |
|---|---|---|---|---|
| 1999 | Mercury | Belgium, France, Switzerland | CD | 5467402 |
