= Bienvenue chez moi =

Greatest hits album by Florent Pagny
- Released: September 26, 1995
- Genre: Pop
- Label: Mercury, Polygram

Florent Pagny chronology
Rester vrai (1994)	Bienvenue chez moi (1995)	Savoir aimer (1997)

Singles from Bienvenue chez moi
- 1. "Caruso" Released: January 1996; 2. "Oh Happy Day" Released: October 1996

Professional ratings
Review scores
Source	Rating
Allmusic	3/5 stars

Bienvenue chez moi (French pronunciation: [bjɛ̃vny ʃe mwa]) is a 1995 album recorded by French singer Florent Pagny. It can be considered a compilation because it contains the singer's previous hit singles, plus some new songs. It was his fourth album overall and was released on September 26, 1995. It achieved huge success in France and Belgium (Wallonia), where it remained charted respectively for 81 and 73 weeks, including several weeks atop. There are three duets on this album : "I Don't Know", with Noa, "Jamais", with Johnny Hallyday and "Oh Happy Day", with La Chorale des Cherubins de Sarcelles. The cover version of Lucio Dalla's song, "Caruso", was released as single and became a success (#2 in France, #3 in Belgium).

== Track listing ==
1. "Bienvenue chez moi" (Erick Benzi) — 4:11
2. "N'importe quoi" (Pagny, Vernoux) — 3:51
3. "Si tu veux m'essayer" (Sam Brewski) — 4:03
4. "Ça fait des nuits" (Pagny) — 3:57
5. "Tue-moi" (Basset, Langolff) — 3:38
6. "Est-ce que tu me suis ?" (Brewski) — 4:31
7. "I Don't Know" (duet with Noa) — 4:43
8. "Caruso" (Lucio Dalla) — 5:44
9. "Jamais" (Arzel, Canada) (duet with Johnny Hallyday) — 3:36
10. "Laissez-nous respirer" (Pagny) — 4:03
11. "Presse qui roule" (Pagny) — 4:43
12. "Qu'est-ce qu'on a fait ?" (Pagny) — 4:10
13. "Oh Happy Day" (Hawkins) (duet with La Chorale des Cherubins de Sarcelles) — 5:10
14. "Merci" (Pagny) — 4:14

Source : Allmusic.

== Charts ==
Chart (1995–1997)	Peak position
Belgian (Wallonia) Albums Chart	1
French SNEP Albums Chart	1

End of year chart (1995)	Position
Belgian (Wallonia) Albums Chart	45

== Certifications and sales ==
Region	Certification	Certified units/sales
France (SNEP)	Diamond	1,000,000^{*}
Switzerland (IFPI Switzerland)	Platinum	50,000^{^}
^{*} Sales figures based on certification alone.^{^} Shipments figures based on certification alone.

== Releases ==
Date	Label	Country	Format	Catalog
1995	Philips	Belgium, France, Switzerland	CD	528759
2000	Polygram	Belgium, France, Switzerland	CD	5287592
