= Yo canto (Julio Iglesias album) =

Studio album by Julio Iglesias
- Released: 1969
- Genre: Latin pop
- Label: Columbia CP 9035
- Producer: Julio Iglesias

Julio Iglesias chronology
Yo canto (1969)	Por una Mujer (1972)

Singles from Yo canto
- 1. "La vida sigue igual" Released: 1968; 2. "El viejo Pablo" Released: 1968; 3. "No llores mi amor" Released: 1969; 4. "Yo canto" Released: 1969; 5. "Bla, Bla, Bla" Released: 1970; 6. "Chiquilla" Released: 1970

Yo canto (I sing) is the debut album by Spanish recording artist Julio Iglesias, released in 1969. The album spent 15 weeks in the Spanish charts, and peaked at No. 3. The album generated four hit singles in the Spanish charts.

The debut album was recorded after learning the guitar while in recovery from an automobile accident that ended his dreams of playing soccer professionally.

== Track listing ==
No.	Title	Writer(s)	Length
1.	"La vida sigue igual"	Julio Iglesias	3:35
2.	"Tenía una guitarra"	Julio Iglesias	3:10
3.	"Bla, bla, bla"	Julio Iglesias	3:40
4.	"El viejo Pablo"	Julio Iglesias	3:00
5.	"Hace unos años"	Julio Iglesias	3:55
6.	"No llores, mi amor"	Julio Iglesias	2:54
7.	"Yo canto"	Julio Iglesias	3:20
8.	"Alguien que pasó"	Julio Iglesias	4:10
9.	"Mis recuerdos"	Julio Iglesias	2:45
10.	"En un barrio que hay en la ciudad"	Julio Iglesias	2:40
11.	"Lágrimas tiene el camino"	Julio Iglesias	2:26
12.	"Chiquilla"	Julio Iglesias	4:30
