= Por una mujer =

Studio album by Julio Iglesias
- Released: 1972

Julio Iglesias chronology
Yo canto (1969)	Por una mujer (1972)	Soy (1969)

Por una mujer (By a woman) is 1972 studio album by Julio Iglesias. The title song, sung in the Galician language, it was one of Iglesias's greatest hits, and led to his fame in Europe and Latin America; by 1975 he was one of the top three artists in Latin America5. Billboard cites it as Iglesias's "first big sales success", and that he also recorded it in Japanese and German, with success in Europe, Japan and Mexico.

== Track listing ==
A-Side

1. "Un canto a Galicia" (4:15)
2. "Hombre solitario" (2:29)
3. "Veces llegan cartas" (3:08)
4. "Rio rebelde" (2:54)
5. "Si volvieras otra vez" (3:36)

B-side

1. "Por una mujer" (4:53)
2. "No soy de aqui" (3:43)
3. "En un rincón del désvan" (4:29)
4. "Sweet Caroline" (3:34)
5. "Como el álamo al camino" (3:45)

== Charts ==
Weekly chart performance for Un canto a Galicia
Chart (1972–73)	Peak position
Dutch Albums (Dutch Charts)	1
French Albums (SNEP)	14
German Albums (Media Control)	24
