= Rester vrai =

Studio album by Florent Pagny
- Released: March 1994
- Genre: Pop, Rock
- Label: Mercury, Universal Music
- Producer: Erick Benzi

Florent Pagny chronology
Réaliste (1992)	Rester vrai (1994)	Bienvenue chez moi (1995)

Singles from Rester vrai
- 1. "Est-ce que tu me suis ?" Released: May 1994; 2. "Si tu veux m'essayer" Released: August 1994

Rester vrai (French pronunciation: [ʁɛste vʁɛ]) is a 1994 album recorded by French singer Florent Pagny. It was his third studio album and was released in March 1994. It achieved moderate success in France where it remained charted for 39 weeks in the top 50, including a peak at #19 for two weeks. For the first time in Pagny's career, lyrics were written by other artists such as Jean-Jacques Goldman who participated under the pseudonym of Sam Brewski. This album provided two singles : the unsuccessful "Est-ce que tu me suis ?" (#45 in France) and the hit single "Si tu veux m'essayer" (#7 in France), which was recorded as "If You Want to Know Me" in 2009 by the Belgian singer Dana Winner for the album "Between Now and Tomorrow" with English lyrics by Michael Leahy. The music video for the track "Rester vrai" was directed by Dani Jacobs and shot in London and features Pagny trapped in a glass box in a large empty space as if he is a museum exhibit or part of an experiment. The music video for "Si tu veux m'essayer" was directed by Doug Nichol and filmed at the Park Lane Hotel in New York City.

== Track listing ==
1. "J'irai quand même"
2. "Si tu veux m'essayer"
3. "Rêve aussi le jour"
4. "Est-ce que tu me suis ?"
5. "Comme de l'eau"
6. "Rester vrai"
7. "Rappelle-toi de tes rêves"
8. "Les Hommes qui doutent"
9. "Loin"
10. "Vent d'Orient"
11. "Jamais"

Source : Allmusic.

== Charts ==
Chart (1994)	Peak position
French SNEP Albums Chart	19

== Certifications and sales ==
Region	Certification	Certified units/sales
France (SNEP)	2× Gold	200,000^{*}
^{*} Sales figures based on certification alone.

== Releases ==
Date	Label	Country	Format	Catalog
1994	Mercury	Belgium, France, Switzerland	CD	5222842
2000	Mercury	Belgium, France, Switzerland	CD	5222842
