= Soy (Julio Iglesias album) =

Studio album by Julio Iglesias
- Released: 1973
- Genre: Latin pop
- Label: Columbia

Julio Iglesias chronology
Por una mujer (1972)	Soy (1973)	Und das Meer singt sein Lied (1973)

Singles from Soy
- 1. "Así nacemos" Released: 1973; 2. "Minueto" Released: 1973; 3. "Dieciseis años" Released: 1974

Soy (I Am) is a 1973 album by Julio Iglesias. A U.S. version was released in 1980. It was released on the Columbia label. An English language version of Soy called Así Nacemos was released to the United States and Canadian markets in the same year.

== Track listing ==
No.	Title	Writer(s)	Length
1.	"Vivencias (Iglesias/Navarro/Prida)"	Julio Iglesias	3:25
2.	"En una ciudad cualquiera (Iglesias)"	Julio Iglesias	3:55
3.	"Soy (Iglesias)"	Julio Iglesias	3:40
4.	"Minueto (Iglesias/Ruiz)"	Julio Iglesias	3:45
5.	"Mi amor es más joven que yo (Fontana/Iglesias) Ltd."	Julio Iglesias	2:35
6.	"Dieciseis años (Danie/Marti)"	Julio Iglesias	3:25
7.	"Niña (Manuel Alejandro/Magdalena)"	Julio Iglesias	3:35
8.	"Una Leyenda La Leyenda Del Indio (Iglesias)"	Julio Iglesias	3:55
9.	"Así Nacemos (Alvarez/Casas)"	Julio Iglesias	3:27
10.	"Vete ya (Iglesias/Navarro)"	Julio Iglesias	4:20

=== Así Nacemos track listing ===
1. Así nacemos (1st versión) 3:49
2. Tenía una guitarra 3:10
3. Bla, bla, bla 3:40
4. Hace unos años 3:55
5. Alguien que pasó 4:10
6. Niña 3:42
7. A Chicago (Dear Mrs. Jane) 2:53
8. Dahil sa´yo 2:56
9. No es verdad 2:17
10. 24 horas 4:25

== Sources and external links ==
- Julio Iglesias Discography
