= Tragédie (duo) =

- Origin: Nantes, Pays de la Loire, France
- Genres: Hip hop, R&B
- Years active: 1998–2005; 2015–present
- Labels: Warner; Up Music
- Members: Daniel Guiro (Silky Shaï); Thierry Rakotomanga (Tizy Bone); Hazdine Souiri (Az)

Tragédie (French: [tʁaʒedi]) is a French rap and R&B duo made up of Thierry Rakotomanga (a.k.a. Tizy Bone) and Daniel Guiro (a.k.a. Silky Shaï) from Nantes, France. They had 3 singles that reached #1 in France.

== Discography ==
=== Studio album ===
- 2003: Tragédie
- 2004: À fleur de peau
- 2010: TBA

=== Singles ===
- 2003: "Hey Oh"
- 2004: "Sexy pour Moi"
- 2004: "Eternellement"
- 2004: "Je reste Ghetto" (featuring Reed the Weed)
- 2004: "Gentleman"
- 2005: "Bye Bye" (featuring Calvin Scott)
- 2005: "L'art du corps et du cœur"
- 2005: "Merci"

=== Solo singles ===
Tizy Bone

- 2009: Ola

Silk Shaï

- 2009: C'est Mon Son
