= À vous les femmes =

Studio album by Julio Iglesias
- Released: 1979
- Genre: Rock, Latin, pop
- Label: CBS
- Producer: Ramón Arcusa

À vous les femmes is a 1979 album by Julio Iglesias.

== Track listing ==
No.	Title	Writer(s)	Length
1.	"Pauvres Diables (Pobre Diablo)"	Julio Iglesias	2:58
2.	"L'amour c'est quoi (Preguntale)"	Julio Iglesias	4:49
3.	"Les Traditions (La nostra buona educazione)"	Julio Iglesias	3:31
4.	"Je n'ai pas changé (No vengo ni voy)"	Julio Iglesias	3:29
5.	"Moi je t'aime (Summer Love)"	Julio Iglesias	3:19
6.	"Où est passée ma bohême ? (Quièreme mucho)"	Julio Iglesias	3:52
7.	"Le Mal de toi (Voy a perder la cabeza por tu amor)"	Manuel Alejandro	4:31
8.	"Souriez madame (Con una pinta asi)"	Julio Iglesias	3:31
9.	"Je l'aime encore (Donde estaras)"	Julio Iglesias	2:55
10.	"Un jour c'est toi, un jour c'est moi (Give Me Your Love)"	Julio Iglesias	3:01

== Certifications and sales ==
Region	Certification	Certified units/sales
Canada (Music Canada)	Gold	50,000^{^}
France (SNEP)	Diamond	1,200,000
^{^} Shipments figures based on certification alone.
