= Preface (band) =

Preface is a French musical band established in 1986 with members Manu Katché on vocals and drums, Jean-Yves D'Angelo (keyboards and vocals) and Kamil Rustam (guitars and vocals). The band was signed to Phonogram and had an extended debut single Palace Hotel on Anya record label. They followed it up with a second single S'il Te Plait.

The band also collaborated on the soundtrack to the film Black Mic Mac 2.

In 1989, third single "Un an un jour une heure" but disbanded after three years of activity, with band members pursuing solo careers.

== Discography ==
=== EPs and Albums ===
- Palace Hotel 4'05 / Palace Hotel (instrumental) 4'10 (single) - 884 584-7 - 1986
- Palace Hotel 8'13 / Palace Hotel 4'05 (maxi single) 884 584-1 - 1986
- S'il te plait 4'05 / Ninja 3'57 (single) 109776 - 1988
- S'il te plait Mix La Menace - remix 5'39 / S'il te plait - version 45 tours + Ninja 3'57 (maxi single) 609776 - 1988
- Un An, un Jour, une Heure 4'07 / Preuve d'amour 3'57 (single) 112178 - 1989
- "Eklectic Guitar" Background Music - LP Music Library KoKa MEDIA VOL56 - 1987

(Rock FM / Funky / Ballades / Boogie...) W Rock - Driving Rock - Funky Moon -Chic - Wha - Rush Indigo - Fiesta - Candy Sweet - Deep Kingston - Eklectic Guitar

- "Drivin'USA" Background Music - CD Music Library KoK 2001 - 1987

Driving Rock - Indigo - Chic

- "Black Mic Mac 2 - Soundtrack" 30462 PM 520 - 1988

Shango - Innocence - Rencontre - Aida - White wedding - Lettres - Taxi Brousse - Shango Affair - Rires - Taxi Emotion - Sacrifice - Mère Gabriel - The chase - White wedding (sax) - Shango II
