= Hey Oh =

Single by Tragédie

from the album Tragédie
- B-side: "Original mix"
- Released: September 2003
- Recorded: France, 2003
- Genre: Contemporary R&B
- Length: 3:32
- Label: Warner Music
- Songwriters: Dom Bamboo, Tizy Bone; DJ Dem's, Silky Shai
- Producer: Stan Courtois

Tragédie singles chronology
"Hey Oh" (2003)	"Sexy pour moi" (2003)

"Hey Oh" is a 2003 song recorded by French duet Tragédie. This R&B song was released as debut single from the album Tragédie in September 2003. It achieved a huge success in France and Belgium where it stayed at the top of the singles charts for several weeks. This song can be considered as Tragédie's signature song and the most successful single of the band. Two versions (radio edit and part II) are included on the album. The song also featured in a live version on band's album Live, released in 2005.

An earlier version of the song contains an instrumental taken from the song "Family Affair" by Mary J. Blige. Later versions used an original instrumental, which was released as a single and featured on their debut album.

The song was covered by Les Enfoirés on their album 2011: Dans l'œil des Enfoirés, and included in the medley "À la porte du Night Club". The song was performed by Amel Bent, Jenifer Bartoli, Thomas Dutronc, Grégoire, Jean-Baptiste Maunier, Yannick Noah, Jean-Michèle Laroque, MC Solaar and Pascal Obispo.

== Chart performance ==
In France, the single went straight to number-one on 21 September 2003, and stayed there for nine non-consecutive weeks. Then it kept on dropping on the chart, totalling 14 weeks in the top ten, 18 weeks in the top 50 and 21 weeks on the chart (top 100). As of August 2014, the song was the tenth best-selling single of the 21st century in France, with 763,000 units sold.

In Belgium (Wallonia), the single went to number six on 1 November 2003 and spent eight weeks at top. It totaled 13 weeks in the top five and 21 weeks in the top 40.

== Track listings ==
- CD single
1. "Hey Oh" (radio edit) — 3:32
2. "Hey Oh" (original mix) — 4:22
- 7" maxi
1. "Hey Oh" (radio edit) — 3:32
2. "Hey Oh" (original mix) — 4:22
- Digital download
1. "Hey Oh" (radio edit)
2. "Hey Oh" (part II)
3. "Hey Oh" (live)

== Charts and certifications ==
=== Weekly charts ===
Chart (2003/04)	Peak position
Belgian (Wallonia) Singles Chart	1
French SNEP Singles Chart	1
Swiss Singles Chart	5

=== Year-end charts ===
Chart (2003)	Position
Belgian (Wallonia) Singles Chart	16
French Singles Chart	2
Swiss Singles Chart	63
Chart (2004)	Position
Belgian (Wallonia) Singles Chart	52
Swiss Singles Chart	79
Chart (2005)	Position
Brazil (Crowley)	97

=== Certifications ===
Certifications for "Hey Oh"
Region	Certification	Certified units/sales
Belgium (BRMA)	Platinum	50,000^{*}
France (SNEP)	Platinum	500,000^{*}
^{*} Sales figures based on certification alone.
