= Laisse parler les gens =

Single by Jocelyne Labylle and Cheela feat. Passi and Jacob Desvarieux

from the album Dis L'Heure 2 Zouk
- Released: June 2003
- Recorded: 2003
- Genre: Zouk
- Length: 3:21
- Songwriters: Jocelyne Labylle; Edmond Goyor

Jocelyne Labylle and Cheela feat. Passi and Jacob Desvarieux singles chronology
"Laisse parler les gens" (2003)	"Ma Rivale" (2003)

"Laisse parler les gens" (Let People Talk) is a song released in the summer of 2003 in Europe, Africa and in the Caribbeans. The song features Jocelyne Labylle, Cheela, Passi and Jacob Desvarieux. It is Afro-Zouk and is from the album Dis L'heure 2 Zouk. The song sold more than a million copies and was nominated for Victoires de la musique. This song was the summer anthem of 2003 in France, Belgium (where it was a number-one hit), Africa, and the Caribbean. As of August 2014, the song was the 12th best-selling single of the 21st century in France, with 640,000 units sold.

== Track listings ==
CD single

1. "Laisse parler les gens" — 3:21
2. "L'anmitié bell" by Dersion & Lynnsha — 4:26

== Charts and sales ==
=== Peak positions ===
Chart (2003)	Peak position
Belgian (Wallonia) Singles Chart	1
French SNEP Singles Chart	1
Swiss Singles Chart	22

=== Year-end charts ===
Chart (2003)	Position
Belgian (Wallonia) Singles Chart	14
French Airplay Chart	11
French SNEP Singles Chart	3
French TV Music Videos Chart	8
Swiss Singles Chart	74

=== Certifications ===
Country	Certification	Date	Sales certified
Belgium	Gold	1 November 2003	25,000
France	Platinum	18 December 2003	500,000
