= Sang pour sang =

Studio album by Johnny Hallyday
- Released: 13 September 1999
- Recorded: France, 1999
- Genre: Rock
- Label: Mercury, Universal Music
- Producer: Johnny Hallyday

Johnny Hallyday chronology
Stade de France 1998 - Allume le feu (1998)	Sang pour sang (1999)	100% Johnny - Live à la tour Eiffel (2000)

Singles from Sang pour sang
- 1. "Vivre pour le meilleur" Released: May 1999; 2. "Un jour viendra" Released: August 1999; 3. "Sang pour sang" Released: November 1999; 4. "Partie de cartes" Released: March 2000; 5. "Pardon" Released: June 2000; 6. "Quelques cris" Released: October 2000

Professional ratings
Review scores
Source	Rating
Allmusic	3/5 stars

Sang pour sang is a 1999 album recorded by French singer Johnny Hallyday. It was released on 13 September 1999, and achieved huge success in France and Belgium (Wallonia), where it topped the charts and stayed on the charts for respectively two and one years. It provided five top 15 singles in France : "Vivre pour le meilleur" (No. 2), "Un jour viendra" (No. 6), "Sang pour sang" (No. 9), "Partie de cartes" (No. 13) and "Pardon" (No. 9). David Hallyday, Johnny's son, participated in the composition of all the songs of the album, along with Miossec and Zazie.

== Track listing ==
1. "Sang pour sang" (Eric Chemouny, David Hallyday) — 4:15
2. "Le Poids de mes maux" (Zazie, David Hallyday) — 4:53
3. "Quelques cris" (Françoise Sagan, David Hallyday) — 5:25
4. "Un jour viendra" (Michel Mallory, David Hallyday) — 4:04
5. "Notre histoire" (Miossec, David Hallyday) — 3:59
6. "Les Larmes de gloire" (Vincent Ravalec, David Hallyday) — 3:30
7. "Si tu m'aimais" (Michel Mallory, David Hallyday) — 5:21
8. "Remise de peine" (Miossec, David Hallyday) — 4:21
9. "Partie de cartes" (Vincent Ravalec, David Hallyday) — 4:16
10. "Pardon" (Philippe Labro, David Hallyday) — 3:57
11. "Ex" (Miossec, David Hallyday) — 4:47
12. "Je t'aime comme je respire" (Pierre Grillet, David Hallyday) — 4:52
13. "Vivre pour le meilleur" (Lionel Florence, David Hallyday) — 4:32

Source : Allmusic.

== Charts ==
=== Weekly charts ===
Chart (1999–2001)	Peak position
Belgian (Wallonia) Albums Chart	1
French SNEP Albums Chart	1
Swiss Albums Chart	47

=== Year-end charts ===
Chart (1999)	Position
Belgian (Wallonia) Albums Chart	3
French Albums Chart	2
Chart (2000)	Position
Belgian (Wallonia) Albums Chart	21
French Albums Chart	15
Chart (2001)	Position
French Albums Chart	54

== Certifications and sales ==
Region	Certification	Certified units/sales
Belgium (BRMA)	Platinum	50,000^{*}
France (SNEP)	Diamond	1,000,000^{*}
Switzerland (IFPI Switzerland)	Platinum	50,000^{^}
^{*} Sales figures based on certification alone.^{^} Shipments figures based on certification alone.

== Releases ==
Date	Label	Country	Format	Catalog
November 1999	Polygram International	Belgium, France, Switzerland	CD	546625
2006	Universal Music	Belgium, France, Switzerland	CD	9830361
2006	Universal Music	Belgium, France, Switzerland	CD	9818960
2006	Universal Music	Belgium, France, Switzerland	CD	9840992
2008	Mercury	Belgium, France, Switzerland	CD	9818960
