= Ma liberté de penser =

Single by Florent Pagny

from the album Ailleurs land
- B-side: "Guérir"
- Released: March 2003
- Genre: Pop
- Length: 3:27
- Label: Mercury, Universal Music
- Songwriter(s): Lionel Florence, Pascal Obispo
- Producer(s): Pascal Obispo

Florent Pagny singles chronology
"L'Air du temps" (2002)	"Ma liberté de penser" (2003)	"Je trace" (2003)

"Ma liberté de penser" (French pronunciation: [ma libɛʁte də pɑ̃se]) is a 2003 pop song recorded by French singer Florent Pagny. It was the first single from his album Ailleurs land, and was released in March 2003. It achieved a huge success in France and Belgium (Wallonia), topping the singles charts for several weeks.

== Song information ==
The song was composed both by Lionel Florence and Pascal Obispo who had previously worked with Pagny. It was also performed during Pagny's 2003 and 2005 tours and was hence available in live versions on the album Été 2003 à l'Olympia and Baryton - L'intégrale du spectacle.

The song is an ironic response to the treasury which, at the time, pursued the singer for unreported income. In the lyrics, Pagny claims that they could take all at the material level, but that they shall never take his independence of mind. In the video, a bailiff and repo men are emptying the singer's apartment.

In France, the single went straight to number six on 29 March 2003 and reached number one from its fourth to its ninth week. It then did not stop to drop, totalling 14 weeks in the top ten, 18 weeks in the top 50 and 21 weeks on the charts (top 100). As of August 2014, the song was the 33rd best-selling single of the 21st century in France, with 486,000 units sold.

In 2008, the song was covered in a medley named "Au secret" by Amel Bent, Karen Mulder and a choir from Strasbourg, available on Les Enfoirés' album Les Secrets des Enfoirés.

== Track listings ==
- CD single
1. "Ma liberté de penser" — 3:27
2. "Guérir" — 4:40
- Digital download
1. "Ma liberté de penser" — 3:27
2. "Ma liberté de penser" (live 2003) — 3:27
3. "Ma liberté de penser" (live 2005) — 3:55

== Charts and certifications ==
=== Weekly charts ===
Chart (2003)	Peak position
Belgian (Wallonia) Singles Chart	1
French SNEP Singles Chart	1
Swiss Singles Chart	8

=== Year-end charts ===
Chart (2003)	Position
Belgian (Wallonia) Singles Chart	12
French Singles Chart	8
Swiss Singles Chart	54

=== Certifications ===
Region	Certification	Certified units/sales
Belgium (BEA)	Gold	25,000^{*}
France (SNEP)	Platinum	500,000^{*}
^{*} Sales figures based on certification alone.
