= Jocelyne Labylle =

- Born: 1973 (age 52–53); Saint-Claude, Guadeloupe, France
- Origin: Guadeloupe
- Genres: Zouk
- Occupation: Singer
- Years active: 1992–present

Jocelyne Labylle (born 1973 in Saint-Claude, Guadeloupe) is a Guadeloupean zouk musician.

== Career ==
In 1992, Labylle joined the group Elodie. In 1994, she joined Zouk Orchestra, and appeared on the covers of all their albums.

After performing on three of their albums, Labylle left to pursue a solo career. She teamed up with Federick Caracas, Harry Diboula, Jacob Desvarieux and Liso to record the single "Quand tu veux". Months later the album On verra was released.

In 2000 she returned to the studio to record her second album. The single "J'ai deposé les clefs" ("I left my keys") was released followed by the album Ma Petite Lumiere ("My little light"). The album features "Parle-moi d'elle" written by Harry Diboula.

In 2003, she met Passi, Cheela, and Jacob Desvarieux. Together they produced the single Laisse parler les gens (the video was shot in the Antilles and directed by J.G. Biggs). Despite controversy surrounding the song's composition — which was alleged to be a plagiarism by Jocelyne Labylle of a work (Je reviendrai toujours) by Henri Debs — the record sold more than 1 million copies and was nominated for the Victoires de la musique. The single became one of the summer hits in France, Africa, and the Caribbean and received Platinum certification. On 28 March 2007, the Paris High Court ended the controversy, ruling that the single had indeed been plagiarized. The court ordered EMI Music and Issap Production to pay Henri Debs €15,000 and prohibited them from exploiting the song in any form.

In 2007, she collaborated with Haitian musician Roberto Martino of the compas group T-Vice for his single "J'aimerais te revoir".

== Discography ==
=== Albums ===
Affaire de femme (1992)

1. Affaire de femme
2. Révolution
3. Manti si manti
4. Confusion
5. Zéro lov'
6. Flash back

On ti moman (1994)

1. On ti moman
2. L'adolescent
3. Es ou timid
4. Amour à Milie
5. Autrement
6. Ban mwen nouvel
7. Rèv en mwen
8. Angoisse
9. Si j'étais

On verra (1998)

1. Tout donner
2. Quand tu veux
3. On verra
4. Monté é desan'
5. Di mwen
6. L'homme idéal
7. An nou love
8. Ce n'est qu'un au revoir

Ma petite lumière (2000)

1. Parle moi d'elle
2. Je reconnais
3. Jusqu'au bout
4. J'ai déposé les clés
5. Il y a quelque chose en toi
6. Parle moi d'elle (version acoustique)
7. Ma petite lumière
8. Hommage à coupé cloué
9. Tout ça pour toi
10. Medley labylle remix magic jam
11. J'ai déposé les clés (version acoustique)
12. Jocelyne et vous

Roots chic tambour bling-bling! (2009)

1. Nèg La
2. Grèv'
3. Chat' Epi Rat'
4. Zécal En Mwen
5. An Fanm A Kaz En Mwen (Feat. Marie José Gibon)
6. Fanm Epi Tambou

An ti fanm gwada (2010)

1. Vini
2. Avan I Two Ta (Feat. Jocelyne Béroard)
3. Quelqu'un De Bien
4. Désolé Ça Désolant (Feat. Jean-Philippe Marthély)
5. On Ti Nom' Kreyol (Feat. Gordon Henderson)
6. Je Te Promets
7. On Est Dans La Merde
8. Chérie Pa Douté (Feat. Bisso Na Bisso)
9. Pété Les Plombs
10. Pourquoi Pas ?
11. Toujou La ? (Feat. T-Vice)
12. J'aimerais Te Revoir (Feat. T-Vice)
13. Laisse Parler Les Gens (Feat. Cheela, Passi & Jacob Desvarieux)

=== Singles ===
- "Quand tu veux" (1998)
- "J'ai depose les clefs" (2000)
- "Jusqu'au bout" (2000)
- "Laisse Parler Les Gens" (2003)
- "Day'O" (2004)
