= Merci (restaurant) =

Restaurant in Mérida, Yucatán

Coordinates: 20°59′02″N 89°37′11″W

- Interactive map of Merci

Restaurant information
- Established: 2014
- Owner: Regina Escalante
- Location: Mérida, 97000, Mexico
- Website: restaurantemerci.com

Merci is a contemporary Mexican restaurant in Mérida, Yucatán. It was opened by Regina Escalante in 2014, and has two establishments in the city. It was featured in the travel show Eva Longoria: Searching for Mexico (2023).
