= Ailleurs land =

Studio album by Florent Pagny
- Released: April 8, 2003
- Genre: Pop
- Label: Mercury, Universal Music

Florent Pagny chronology
| 2 (2001) | Ailleurs land (2003) | Été 2003 à l'Olympia live (2004) |

Singles from Ailleurs land
- 1. "Ma Liberté de penser" Released: March 2003; 2. "Je trace" Released: July 2003

Ailleurs land is a 2003 album recorded by French singer Florent Pagny. It was his tenth album overall and was released on April 8, 2003. It achieved huge success in France and Belgium (Wallonia), where it remained charted respectively for 75 and 34 weeks, including several weeks atop. The album was also successful in Switzerland. It was led by the single "Ma Liberté de penser", a number-one hit in both countries, and followed by "Je trace", which had a minor success (#26 in France, #34 in Belgium, #65 in Switzerland). French singers Calogero, Pascal Obispo, Alain Lanty, Canadian singer Daniel Lavoie and actress Sandrine Kiberlain participated in the writing or the composing of the album.

== Track listing ==
1. "Je trace" (Lionel Florence, Maurici, Calogero) — 3:23
2. "Ailleurs land" (Jean-Pierre Lebert, Pascal Obispo) — 3:54
3. "Ma liberté de penser" (Florence, Obispo, Pagny) — 3:24
4. "Je parle même pas d'amour" (Pierre Grillet, Alain Lanty) — 4:26
5. "La Folie d'un ange" (Daran, Filippi) — 3:12
6. "Le Feu à la peau" (Bruce Homs, Daniel Lavoie) — 4:27
7. "Sauf toi" (Frédéric Brun, Nicolas Richard) — 3:10
8. "Demandez à mon cheval" (Asdorve, Lebert, Obispo) — 4:07
9. "Mon amour oublie que je l'aime" (Jérôme Attal, Daran) — 4:15
10. "Guérir" (Daran, Florence) — 4:49
11. "Sur mesure" (Daran, Sandrine Kiberlain) — 4:53

Source : Allmusic.

== Personnel ==
- Denis Bennarosh – drums
- Jean Francois Berger – programming, clavier, realization
- Emerik Castaing – assistant
- Bertrand Chatnet – engineer, vocal engineer
- Daran – synthesizer, acoustic guitar, arranger, electric guitar, classical guitar, realization
- Nick Davis – mixing
- Francois Delabriere – programming, engineer, realization
- Chistopher Deschamps – drums
- Florian Dubos – guitar
- Steve Forward – engineer
- Erik Fostinelli – synthesizer, guitar, percussion, piano, arranger, electric guitar, programming, realization, Bass
- Benoit Fourreau – tuba
- Jean-Paul Gonnod – engineer
- Emmanuel Goulet – programming
- Marc Guéroult – assistant
- Simon Hale – piano, arranger, string arrangements, executive director
- Pierre Jaconelli – electric guitar
- Sylvain Joasson – drums
- Bertrand Lamblot – musical direction
- Sandrine Le Bars – production executive
- Jean Marion – photography, photoshop artist
- Jean-Loup Morette – engineer
- Juan José Mosalini – bandoneon
- Pascal Obispo – acoustic guitar, programming, chorus, realization
- Florent Pagny – chorus
- Benjamin Raffaelli – guitar, realization
- Stanislas Renoult – arranger, string arrangements
- David Salkin – drums
- Miles Showell – mastering
- Greg Slapzinsky – harmonica
- Ian Thomas – drums
- Laurent Vernerey – bass
- Christophe Voisin – programming
- Volodia – engineer

== Charts ==
| Chart (2003–2005) | Peak position |
|---|---|
| Belgian (Wallonia) Albums Chart | 1 |
| French SNEP Albums Chart | 1 |
| Swiss Albums Chart | 2 |

| End of year chart (2003) | Position |
|---|---|
| Belgian (Wallonia) Albums Chart | 4 |
| French Albums Chart | 2 |
| Swiss Singles Chart | 23 |
| End of year chart (2004) | Position |
| French Albums Chart | 91 |

== Certifications and sales ==
| Region | Certification | Certified units/sales |
|---|---|---|
| Belgium (BEA) | Gold | 25,000^{*} |
| France (SNEP) | 3× Platinum | 900,000^{*} |
| Switzerland (IFPI Switzerland) | Platinum | 40,000^{^} |
^{*} Sales figures based on certification alone.^{^} Shipments figures based on certification alone.

== Releases ==
| Date | Label | Country | Format | Catalog |
|---|---|---|---|---|
| 2003 | Universal Music | Belgium, France, Switzerland | CD | 77077 |
| 2003 | Mercury | Belgium, France, Switzerland | CD | 077077 |
| 2003 | Mercury | Belgium, France, Switzerland | CD | 077078 |
| 2006 | Universal Music | Belgium, France, Switzerland | CD | 9801220 |
