= MERCI Retriever =

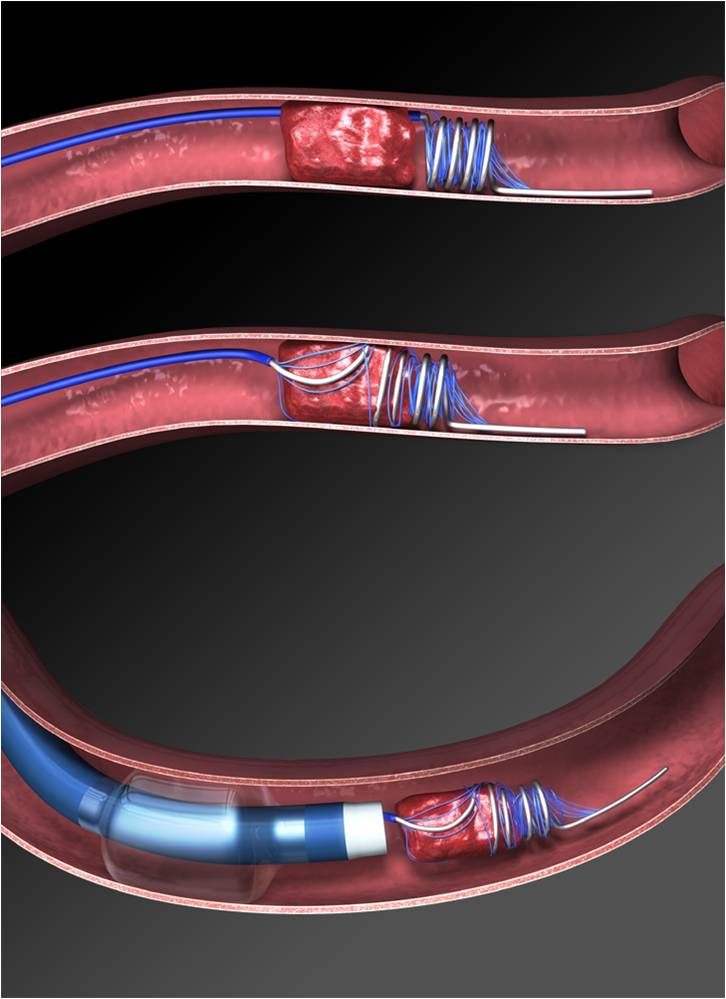
MERCI Retriever L5.

The MERCI Retriever is a medical device designed to treat Ischemic Strokes. The name is an acronym for Mechanical Embolus Removal in Cerebral Ischemia. Designed by University of California, Los Angeles in 2001, MERCI was the first device approved in the U.S. to remove blood clots in patients who had acute brain ischemia.

== Medical uses ==
It may result in benefit in certain people as long as 8 hours after the ischemic event. In this carefully selected group it achieved 48% vessel re-canalization and lower mortality rates than the use of r-tPA in revascularized patients.

== Mechanism ==
In an ischemic stroke, there is an obstruction within blood vessels that supply blood to the brain. The goal in treatment of such a stroke is to restore blood flow through these blood vessels. The MERCI retriever does so by allowing the removal of the blood clots causing the obstruction.

The retriever consists of a long thin wire with a helical coil formed at the distal end. A balloon catheter is snaked into the affected vessel from the femoral artery, and the balloon is inflated to prevent blood flow that could hinder the retrieval process. The retriever is then fed through the catheter, during which the distal coil is straightened to fit through the catheter tube. When the retriever emerges at the clot site, the coil reforms, wrapping around the clot and allowing the clot to be removed with the catheter.

== History ==
The MERCI Retriever obtained U.S. FDA clearance in August 2004 for re-canalization of cerebral arteries in acute stroke.

=== FDA Process ===
Concentric Medical undertook a preliminary study of the MERCI retriever to assess its effectiveness. The manufacturers of the MERCI device filed a 510(k) premarket notification, and received an FDA premarket approval in 2004.
