= Kamil Rustam =

Background information
- Born: 28 January 1962 (age 64)
- Origin: Amsterdam, Netherlands
- Occupations: musician, record producer
- Instruments: guitar, keyboards, bass
- Years active: 1979–present
- Website: kamilrustam.com

Kamil Rustam is a guitarist, composer, arranger, songwriter and producer whose musical career has made known as a prolific musician in many different styles.

Rustam was born in Amsterdam, the Netherlands, and moved at an early age to Paris, France where he worked extensively for most of the top pop French artists, earning the 1985 "Les Victoires de la Musique" for Producer of the Year with his fellow producing partners Manu Katché and Gabriel Yared. He was also nominated as Best Studio Musician at the 1986 and 1987 "Les Victoires de la Musique". In 1996, he moved to Los Angeles where he has been busy working in the American entertainment industry. In 2021 he joined the house band of the French Edition of The Voice The Voice (French TV series) and divides his time between the U.S. and France.

== Career ==
Session musician

Kamil Rustam made himself famous for being able to play whatever style required and quickly became one of the most sought-after session guitarists in France in the 1980s and 1990s, earning him 2 nominations for Best Session Musician at the 1986 and 1987 "Les Victoires De La Musique".

Producing / arranging career

Kamil Rustam started his producing career when schoolmate Patrick Bruel asked him in 1984 to produce his first single "Marre de cette nana-là" which sold over a million copies. He then produced numerous albums for best-selling French artists like Florent Pagny, Patricia Kaas and Phil Barney, and eventually got awarded Best Producer at the 1985 "Les Victoires De La Musique" for Michel Jonasz's album Unis vers l'uni.

Band Preface

From 1985 to 1988 Kamil Rustam was full-time member of the band Preface. The band included Manu Katché on drums and lead vocal.

== Cosmopolitain ==
Kamil Rustam released his debut album, Cosmopolitain, on October 20, 2017. The album contains instrumental compositions written in collaboration with keyboardist Arnaud Dunoyer, as well as an updated arrangement of Squeeze's 1981 hit song 'Tempted'. The album mostly maintains its sound, style and structures within a jazz fusion vein, yet Rustam exhibits his vast knowledge of various musical genres throughout. Contributors to the album include notable session musicians such as keyboardist Randy Kerber, acoustic bassists Mike Valerio, Laurent Vernerey and Tim Lefebvre, electric bassists Hadrien Feraud and Richard Bona, plus drummers Manu Katche, Vinnie Colaiuta and Peter Erskine. The album also includes guest appearances by soloists such as Bob Reynolds on sax, Mike Cottone on trumpet, Marc Berthoumieux on accordion and Philippe Saisse on vibraphone.

Rustam had previously recorded with legendary saxophonist Michael Brecker back in 1997 and the track 'New Amsterdam' had been rerecorded around Brecker's inspired and melodic soloing, ten years after his untimely passing.

The lead track 'Sand Dunes' had been made available in video form prior to the official release and has accumulated over one hundred thousand views since April 2017.

== Artists collaboration ==
List of Artists Kamil Rustam has recorded written or performed with:

- Matt Pokora
- CeCe Winans
- Velton Ray Bunch
- El DeBarge
- Gerry Goffin
- Barry Goldberg
- Vladimir Cosma
- Slimane (singer)
- Marc Lavoine
- Zaz
- Louane
- Anne Sila
- Aaron Neville
- Brent Jones
- Christophe
- Ruben Studdard
- Gabriel Yared
- Julien Doré
- H.B. Barnum
- Kendji Girac
- Nolwenn Leroy
- Jennifer Holliday
- B.B. King
- Michael Brecker
- Patrick Fiori
- Yael Naïm
- Charles Aznavour
- Zazie
- Johnny Hallyday
- Patrick Bruel
- Serge Gainsbourg
- Orchestral Manoeuvres in the Dark
- Michel Berger
- Jean-Jacques Goldman
- Michel Jonasz
- Romano Musumarra
- Maurane
- Manu Katché
- Michael Bland
- MC Solaar
- David Foster
- Gabrial McNair
- Guy Roche
- Shy'm
- Cory Rooney
- Pino Palladino
- David Hallyday
- Humberto Gatica
- Jody Watley
- Patricia Kaas
- Lââm
- Bonnie Tyler
- Ben Vereen
- Florent Pagny
- Francis Cabrel
- Celine Dion
- Jennifer Lopez
- Amel Bent
- Barbra Streisand
- Peter Gabriel
- Alejandro Sanz
- Shaggy
- Christophe Maé
- Charlotte Church
- Josh Groban
- Toni Braxton
- Enrique Iglesias
- Cher
- Merwan Rim
- Nolwenn Leroy
- Vince Gill
- Leslie
- Youssou N'Dour
- Kelly Clarkson
- Bruce Willis
- Snoop Dogg
- Vitaa
- Anastacia
- Chrissie Hynde
- Sinéad O'Connor
- Jessica Simpson
- Aaron Neville
- France Gall
- James Ingram
- En Vogue
- Oleta Adams
- Vanessa Paradis
- Chimène Badi
- Francis Cabrel
- Deniece Williams
- Stephanie Mills
- Peabo Bryson
- Jeffrey Osborne
- Jon Secada
- Sofiane Pamart
- Juliette Armanet
- Patrice Rushen
- Marc Lavoine
- Nolwenn Leroy
- Calogero
- El DeBarge
- Tina Arena
- Claudio Capeo
- Lara Fabian
- Caroline Campbell
- Natasha St-Pier
- Stevie Wonder & John Mayer

== Music and performances for films ==
List includes songs and soundtrack

- 1988: Preuve d'amour
- 1998: Black Mic Mac 2
- 1995: Les Truffes
- 1997: La vérité si je mens
- 1998: Taxi
- 1999: The Bone Collector
- 2000: Rugrats In Paris
- 2000: Under Suspicion
- 2002: The Wild Thornberrys Movie
- 2003: Rugrats Go Wild
- 2006: Blood Diamond
- 2007: The Neighbor
- 2008: Dark Streets
- 2009: The Ministers
- 2010: Lullaby for pi
- 2012: Clash
- 2020: Le Lion
- 2020: Divorce Club
- 2020: C'est Magnifique
- 2020: Call Of Duty Mobile Season 6

== Awards ==
- Best Producer (winner): 1985 "Les Victoires de la Musique"
- Best Session Musician (nominee): 1986 "Les Victoires de la Musique"
- Best Session Musician (nominee): 1987 "Les Victoires de la Musique"
