= Savoir aimer =

Single by Florent Pagny

from the album Savoir aimer
- B-side: "Combien ça va"
- Released: October 1997
- Recorded: France, 1997
- Genre: Pop
- Length: 4:40
- Label: Polygram
- Songwriters: Lionel Florence, Pascal Obispo
- Producer: Caroline Molko

Florent Pagny singles chronology
"Oh Happy Day" (1996)	"Savoir aimer" (1997)	"Chanter" (1998)

"Savoir aimer" (French pronunciation: [savwaʁ ɛme]) is a 1997 song recorded by the French singer Florent Pagny. It was the first single from his album of the same name, on which it features as first track, and his 14th single overall. Released in October 1997, it was a smash success in France and Belgium, topping the chart for several months, and remaining Pagny's most successful single.

== Background and writing ==
The song was composed by Pascal Obispo, who also participated in other two songs on Pagny's album, and written by Lionel Florence, who had also worked for many French singers. In the music video, Pagny is in front of the camera and transcribed the song in French Sign Language.

The song has been performed on Pagny's concerts tours in 1998, 2004 and 2005, and is thus available on the singer's live albums En concert, Été 2003 à l'Olympia and Baryton - L'Intégrale du spectacle. It is part of Pagny's 2008 compilation Les 50 Plus Belles Chansons.

In 2001, the song has been covered by Pagny himself in a duet version with Souad Massi on his album 2 (14th track), which contains songs originally performed by Pagny or other artists overdubbed as duets. As the song was a great success in France, it was included throughout the years on many famous compilations in France, such as Hit Express 5, Les Plus Grandes Chansons du Siècle, vol. 1 (released in 1999), Lionel Florence: des Rencontres et des Mots, Les Plus Belles Victoires de la Musique (2002), Les 100 Plus Belles Chansons (2006) and Hits de diamant (2007).

In 1999 Dutch singer Liesbeth List recorded a Dutch version of this song, called Heb het Leven Lief, for her album Vergezicht, the Dutch lyrics were written by Han Kooreneef.

In 2017, American rap producer Pi'erre Bourne sampled "Savoir aimer" on Young Nudy and 21 Savage's song "EA".

== Chart performance ==
In France, the single went straight to number one on the singles chart on 25 October 1997, which was very rare at the time (it was the fifth). It was dislodged the week after by Aqua's huge hit "Barbie Girl", but managed to reach again number one the week after, and remained at the top for a total of nine weeks. It then dropped first slowly, then more quickly and featured for 19 weeks in the top ten, 23 weeks in the top 50 and 24 weeks in the top 100. It achieved Diamond status and was ranked sixth on the 1997 Annual Chart established only ten weeks after the single release.

In Belgium (Wallonia), the song entered the chart at number 21 on 8 November, climbed to number two, two weeks later and stayed at this place for five weeks, behind "Barbie Girl". Then it topped the chart for four weeks, then almost did not stop to drop. It totaled 14 weeks in the top ten, 19 weeks in the top 20 and 24 weeks in the top 40. It was the fifth best-selling single of 1997, with only nine weeks on the chart.

== Track listings ==
- CD single
1. "Savoir aimer" — 4:43
2. "Combien ça va" — 3:40
- Digital download
1. "Savoir aimer" — 4:40
2. "Savoir aimer" (1998 live version) — 5:26
3. "Savoir aimer" (2004 live version) — 7:22
4. "Savoir aimer" (2005 live baryton version) — 4:18
5. "Savoir aimer" (duet with Souad Massi) — 4:09

== Charts ==
=== Weekly charts ===
Chart (1997/98)	Peak position
Belgian (Wallonia) Singles Chart	1
French SNEP Singles Chart	1
Quebec (ADISQ)	7

=== Year-end charts ===
Chart (1997)	Position
Belgian (Wallonia) Singles Chart	5
French Singles Chart	6

Chart (1998)	Position
Belgian (Wallonia) Singles Chart	39
French Singles Chart	36

== Certifications ==
Region	Certification	Certified units/sales
France (SNEP)	Diamond	750,000^{*}
^{*} Sales figures based on certification alone.
