= Mademoiselle chante... =

Studio album by Patricia Kaas
- Released: November, 1988 (France); May 25, 1989 (Japan)
- Recorded: 1987–1988; Studio CBE, Paris
- Genre: Pop
- Length: 34:57
- Label: BSO, Polydor, PolyGram
- Producer: Joël Cartigny; Bernard Estardy

Patricia Kaas chronology
Mademoiselle chante... (1988)	Scène de vie (1990)

Singles from Mademoiselle chante...
- 1. "Mademoiselle chante le blues" Released: November, 1987; 2. "D'Allemagne" Released: May, 1988; 3. "Mon mec à moi" Released: November 1988; 4. "Elle voulait jouer cabaret" Released: May 1989; 5. "Quand Jimmy dit" Released: October 1989

Professional ratings
Review scores
Source	Rating
Allmusic	4/5 stars

Mademoiselle chante... is the debut studio album by the French singer Patricia Kaas, released in 1988. Preceded by the hit singles "Mademoiselle chante le blues", widely regarded as Kaas' signature song, and "D'Allemagne", the album was a commercial success, selling three million copies.

== Background ==
Patricia Kaas' first single, "Jalouse", produced by actor Gérard Depardieu, caught the attention of the French singer and songwriter Didier Barbelivien. "Mademoiselle chante le blues" (Eng: "Lady sings the blues"), penned by Barbelivien, was released in 1987 by Polydor. The song became Kaas' breakout single reaching number 7 on the French SNEP Singles Chart. Her second single, "D'Allemagne" (Eng: "From Germany"), written by Barbelivien and Bernheim, was released the following year and enjoyed moderate success, peaking at number 11 on the chart.

Shortly afterwards, Kaas' first album Mademoiselle chante... was released. All tracks on the album, except "Venus des abribus", were written by Barbelivien. Three other singles from the album were successful in France: "Mon mec à moi" (No. 5), "Elle voulait jouer cabaret" (No. 17) and "Quand Jimmy dit" (No. 10).

Three of the album's Top 10 singles – "Mademoiselle chante le blues", "Mon mec à moi" and "Quand Jimmy dit" – achieved silver certification in France, each selling over 200,000 copies.

Mademoiselle chante... was Kaas' only studio album released under Polydor (her subsequent releases would be issued by Sony and Columbia).

== Chart performances ==
The album debuted at #19 on the French album charts on December 4, 1988. It entered the top ten one month later and eventually peaked at #2, maintaining the position for two non-consecutive months. The album remained in the top ten for a total of 64 weeks and spent 118 weeks in the top 100, finally dropping off the charts after the July 18, 1991, edition

Shortly after its release, the album went gold in France for shipping over 100,000 copies. Within three months, it achieved platinum status (over 350,000 sold), and was ultimately certified diamond in 1990.

The album was also certified platinum in Belgium, double platinum Switzerland, and gold in Canada. In total, Mademoiselle chante... has sold more than three million copies worldwide.

In 1989, Kaas won Victoires de la Musique, one of France's most prestigious music awards, in the category "Discovery of the Year".

== Track listing ==
No.	Title	Lyrics	Music	Length
1.	"Mon mec à moi"	Didier Barbelivien	François Bernheim	4:14
2.	"Vénus des abribus"	François Bernheim, Élisabeth Depardieu	Dominique Perrier	3:55
3.	"D'Allemagne"	Didier Barbelivien	François Bernheim	4:25
4.	"Des mensonges en musique"	Didier Barbelivien	François Bernheim	4:19
5.	"Un dernier blues"	Didier Barbelivien	Didier Barbelivien	1:37
6.	"Quand Jimmy dit"	Didier Barbelivien	François Bernheim	3:42
7.	"Souvenirs de l'Est"	Didier Barbelivien	François Bernheim	2:56
8.	"Elle voulait jouer cabaret"	Didier Barbelivien	Didier Barbelivien	4:02
9.	"Mademoiselle chante le blues"	Didier Barbelivien	Bob Mehdi	3:48
10.	"Chanson d'amour pas finie"	Didier Barbelivien	François Bernheim	1:36
Total length:				34:57

== Personnel ==
- Gilles Cappé – photography
- Joël Cartigny – producer ("Mademoiselle chante le blues")
- Bernard Estardy – arranger, producer
- Alain Frappier – design
- José Souc – guitar

== Charts ==
=== Weekly charts ===
Weekly chart performance for Mademoiselle chante...
Chart (1988–1989)	Peak position
European Albums (Music & Media)	13
French Albums (SNEP)	2

=== Year-end charts ===
Year-end chart performance for Mademoiselle chante...
Chart (1989)	Position
France (SNEP)	1

== Certifications and sales ==
Region	Certification	Certified units/sales
Canada (Music Canada)	Gold	50,000^{^}
France (SNEP)	Diamond	1,000,000^{*}
Switzerland (IFPI Switzerland)	2× Platinum	100,000^{^}
^{*} Sales figures based on certification alone.^{^} Shipments figures based on certification alone.
