= Art Mengo =

French singer from Toulouse (born 1962)

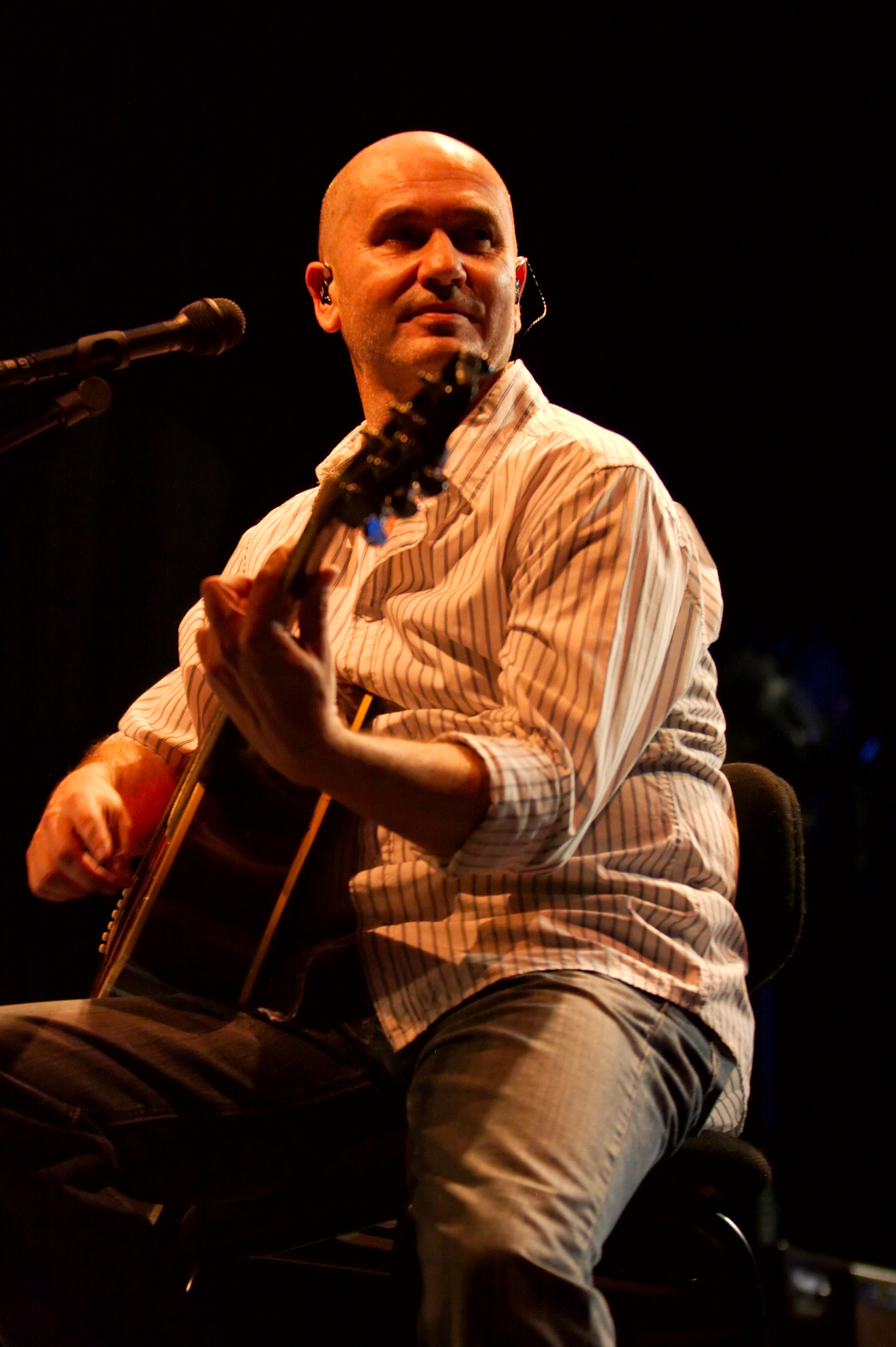
Art Mengo live at the Aix-en-Provence Festival in 2009.

Michel Armengot (born 16 September 1962), more commonly known as Art Mengo, is a French singer and songwriter. Although he was born in the Occitan city of Toulouse in France, he is of Spanish descent.

== Early life ==
Mengo was born approximately 70% deaf. Despite this handicap, his mother gave him a keyboard, which set him on his future career. When he was a teenager, corrective surgery on his ears helped him regain his hearing. Music, however, was not Mengo's first career plan: after completing his baccalauréat, Mengo studied chemistry and physics at university.

== Career ==
During his university years, Mengo played piano at a local bar during the evenings. Mengo had purchased an 8 track recorder, which influenced his move into the music industry. With Mengo writing the music, and his brother-in-law Patrice Guirao producing lyrics, a considerable inventory of music was created.

This work got Mengo a record contract in 1988. Shortly thereafter, he released his first single, "Les Parfums de sa vie (Je l'ai tant aimée)", which was a hit on the French Top 50. His music quickly became popular, and by 1992 he was asked to write a song for French superstar Johnny Hallyday, "Ça ne change pas un homme". In 1993, he wrote an entire album for German singer Ute Lemper. He performed the song "Parler d'amour" with Ute on this album.

== Discography ==
=== Studio albums ===
- Un 15 Août En Février (1990, CBS)
- Guerre D'Amour (1992, Columbia)
- La Mer N'Existe Pas (1995, Columbia)
- Croire Qu'Un Jour (1998, Columbia)
- La Vie De Château (2003, Polydor)
- Entre Mes Guillemets (2006, Polydor)
- Ce Petit Chemin (2012, L'autre Distribution 9311861)

=== Live albums ===
- Live Au Mandala (1998, Columbia)

=== Compilation ===
- Les Parfums De Sa Vie: Le Meilleur (2001, Columbia) 1990–1998
