= Florent Pagny =

French musician and actor (born 1961)

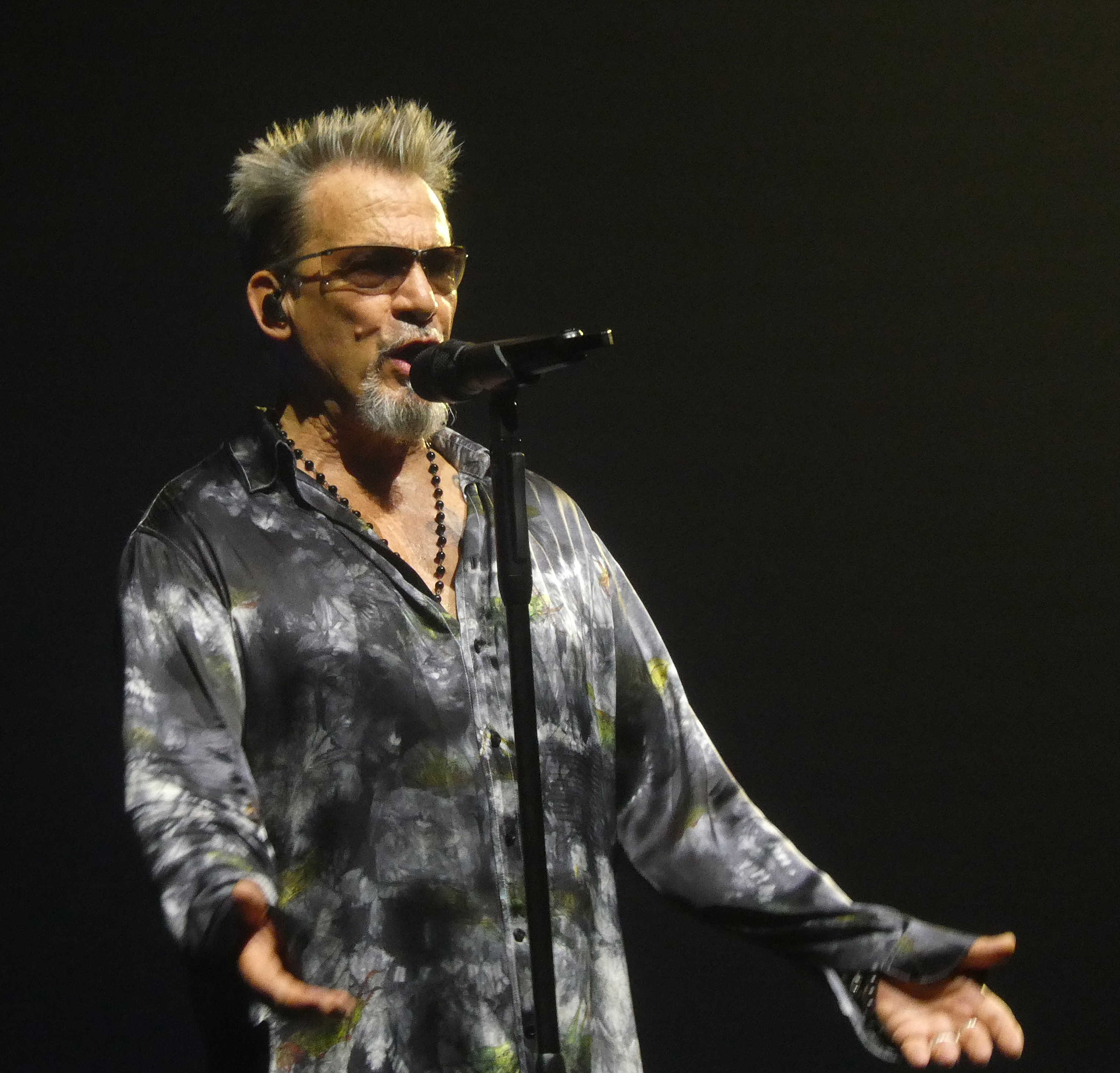
- Pagny performing in Brussels in 2026

Background information
- Born: Florent Pagny; 6 November 1961 (age 64)
- Origin: Chalon-sur-Saône, France
- Genres: Pop
- Occupations: Singer; songwriter; actor
- Instrument: Guitar
- Years active: 1987–present
- Website: www.florentpagny.org (in French)

Florent Pagny (French pronunciation: [flɔʁɑ̃ paɲi]; born 6 November 1961) is a French singer-songwriter, musician and actor. He records his work in French, as well as in Italian, Spanish and English. His greatest hits include "N'importe quoi", "Savoir aimer" and "Ma Liberté de penser"—all three were number one in France. As of 2018, he has sold more than 6 million singles and 10 million albums, becoming the 17th best-selling artist of all time in France.

== Early years ==
Florent Pagny began his artistic career as an actor in popular films and television dramas. He appeared in La Balance, L'As des as, and A Captain's Honor or Fort Saganne.

In 1987, he wrote his first song titled "N'importe quoi". Pagny's first album, Merci, was released in 1990. The album's songs, mainly written by himself, began to attract controversy, with the press eventually boycotting some of them. This led to a decline in sales, culminating in personal problems. His follow-up album, Réaliste, was also not as successful.

Jean-Jacques Goldman wrote three songs for Pagny under the pseudonym Sam Brewski, and presented to him a new staff. The album Rester vrai marked the beginning of his career as a performer only. Bienvenue chez moi, a semi-compilation released in 1995, was a smash success. Pagny also covered "Caruso", the hit originally performed by Lucio Dalla.

== Pagny as a performer ==
He decided to move to Argentinian Patagonia to flee the French tax authorities and to start a new life with his wife, Azucena, and their children. Recently, Pagny said he had enrolled his children in Miami because he didn't want them to speak Arabic while returning from school. His next album, Savoir aimer, was released in 1997. It was composed by a number of writers, including Jean-Jacques Goldman, Erick Benzi, Jacques Veneruso, Zazie and, Pascal Obispo, who also produced the album. "Savoir aimer" turned out to be an immediate success.

In 1999, Pagny released an album of cover versions of his old song, Recréation. From "Môme Julie" to "Antisocial", he mixed musical styles and dabbled with techno arrangements.

Pagny then alternated studios and cover albums (at least in part) and regularly changed his look. In 2000, he released the album Châtelet Les Halles, whose title song was produced by Calogero. He followed that with 2, an album composed of duets released in 2001. In 2003, he returned with Ailleurs land, whose first single, "Ma Liberté de penser", was composed by Pascal Obispo and Lionel Florence and deals with Pagny's problems with the French treasury. Finally, in 2004, Pagny released Baryton, an album composed of opera songs.

In 2007, Pagny released an album of covers of songs originally composed and performed by Jacques Brel entitled Pagny chante Brel.

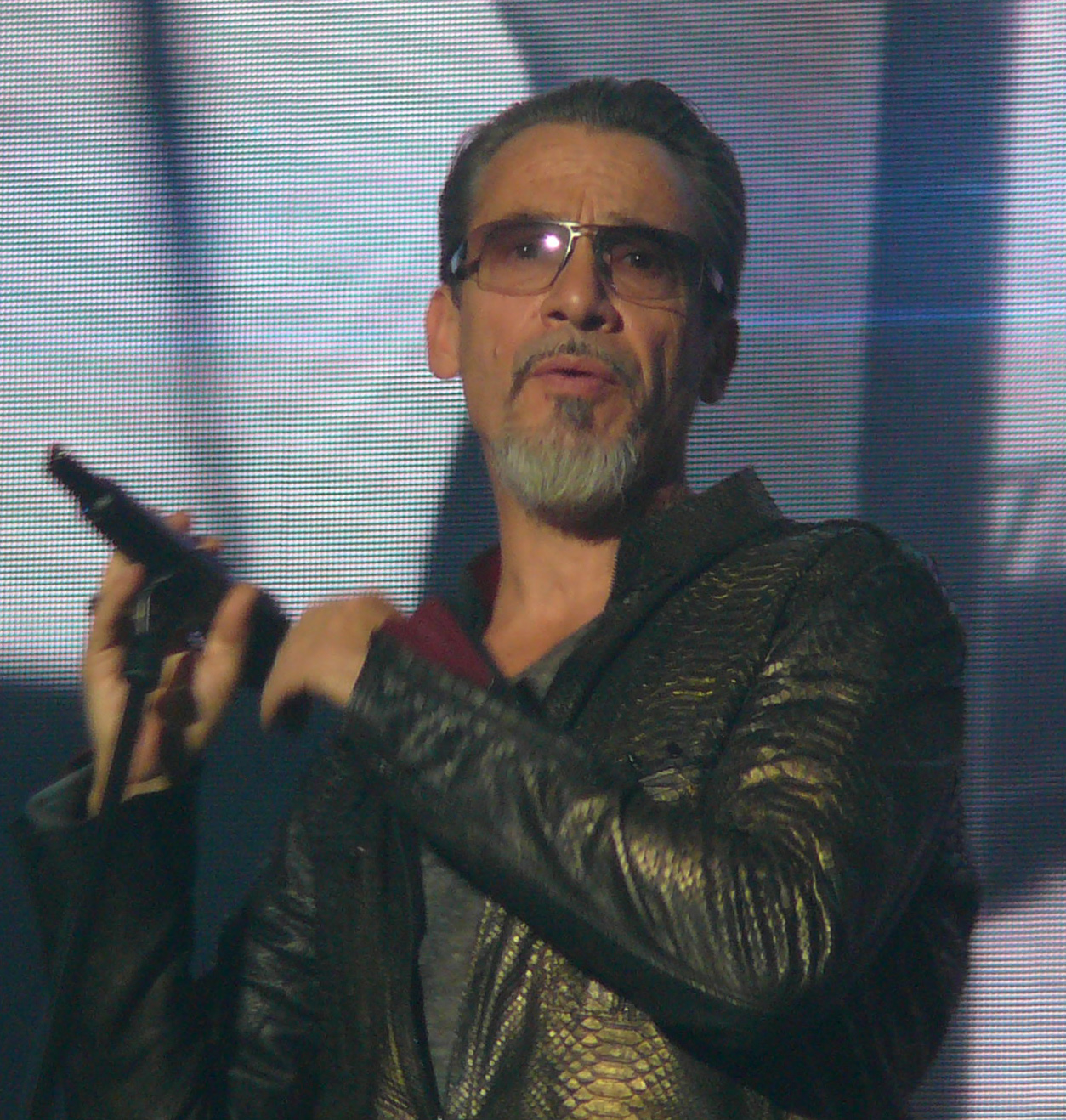
Pagny in Forest National in 2017

== Personal life ==
At 26, Pagny started dating 15-year-old French singer Vanessa Paradis. The relationship ended in 1991.

== Other activities ==
In 2012, Pagny made his debut on the French version of The Voice. He has since remained as a coach until 2018 where he took a two season hiatus after that. He coached again in 2021, 2022, 2025, and 2026. He also participated in the All Stars format, alongside coaches Jenifer, Mika, Zazie and The Voice Kids coach Patrick Fiori. Throughout his time as a coach, he has coached several winners consisting of Stéphan Rizon (from Season 1), Slimane Nebchi (from Season 5), Marghe Davico (from Season 10), Nour Brousse (from Season 11), Il Cello (from Season 14), and Lady O (from Season 15). In the All Stars format, he coached Anne Sila to victory. Thus, he holds the most wins as a coach.

== Discography ==
=== Albums ===
==== Studio albums ====
Year	Album	Peak position				Certification	Notes
Year	Album	FR	BEL (Fl)	BEL (Wa)	SWI	Certification	Notes
1990	Merci	10	—				
1992	Réaliste	20	—				
1994	Rester vrai	19	—			SNEP: 2× Gold	
1997	Savoir aimer	1	—	1	23	BEA: Platinum; IFPI SWI: 2× Platinum	
1999	RéCréation	1	—	4	94	SNEP: Platinum	
2000	Châtelet Les Halles	1	—	3	16	SNEP: 2× Platinum; IFPI SWI: Gold	Double CD
2001	2	3	—	3	8	BEA: Gold; IFPI SWI: Gold	Covers overdubbed as duets
2003	Ailleurs land	1	—	1	2	SNEP: Diamond; BEA: Gold; IFPI SWI: Platinum	
2004	Baryton	1	—	1	19	SNEP: 2× Platinum; BEA: Platinum; IFPI SWI: Gold	
2006	Abracadabra	2	—	2	13	BEA: Gold; IFPI SWI: Gold	
2007	Pagny chante Brel	3	—	1	28	BEA: Platinum	11 covers of Belgian singer Jacques Brel
2009	C'est comme ça	2	—	1	16	SNEP: 2× Platinum; BEA: Gold	Album in Spanish
2010	Tout et son contraire	1	—	1	31	BEA: Platinum	
2012	Baryton. Gracias a la vida	2	176	5	40		Album in Spanish
2013	Vieillir avec toi	1	91	1	9	SNEP: Diamond; BEA: Platinum	
2016	Habana	2	146	4	6	SNEP: Platinum	Album in Spanish
2017	Le présent d'abord	2	110	1	1	SNEP: 2× Platinum; BEA: Gold	
2018	Tout simplement	5	—	4	17		
2019	Aime la vie	2	169	2	5	SNEP: Gold	
2021	L'avenir	1	183	1	8		
2023	2bis	1	40	1	1	SNEP: Gold	
2025	Grandeur nature	1	—	1	5		

==== Live albums ====
Year	Album	Peak position			Certification
Year	Album	FR	BEL (Wa)	SWI	Certification
1998	En concert	2	3		SNEP: 2× Platinum; IFPI SWI: Gold
2004	Été 2003 à l'Olympia	11	4	37	SNEP: Diamond
2005	Baryton – L'intégrale du spectacle	24	12	95	
2012	Ma liberté de chanter - Live Acoustic	6	4	42	
2014	Vieillir ensemble - Le live	33	13	30	

==== Compilations ====
Year	Album	Peak position			Certification
Year	Album	FR	BEL (Wa)	SWI	Certification
1995	Bienvenue chez moi	1	1	—	BEA: Platinum
1999	Les talents du siècle	—	47	—	
2008	Les 50 plus belles chansons	—	39	—	
2008	De part et d'autre – Triple Best Of	—	2	—	
2014	Integrale	—	19	—	
2018	Toujours et encore	—	11	38	

=== Singles ===
Year	Single	Peak position			Certification	Album
Year	Single	FR	BEL (Wa)	SWI	Certification	Album
1988	"N'importe quoi"	1	-	-	SNEP : Platinum	
1988	"Laissez-nous respirer"	8	-	-	-	
1989	"Comme d'habitude"	6	-	-	-	
1990	"J'te jure"	16	-	-	-	Merci
1990	"Ça fait des nuits"	17	-	-	-	Merci
1990	"Presse qui roule"	24	-	-	-	Merci
1991	"Prends ton temps"	42	-	-	-	Merci
1992	"Tue-moi"	24	38	-	-	Réaliste
1993	"Qu'est-ce qu'on a fait?"	46	-	-	-	Réaliste
1994	"Est-ce que tu me suis?"	45	-	-	-	Rester vrai
1994	"Si tu veux m'essayer"	7	-	-	-	Rester vrai
1996	"Caruso"	2	3	-	-	Bienvenue chez moi
1996	"Oh Happy Day"	8	-	-	-	Bienvenue chez moi
1997	"Savoir aimer"	1	1	-	SNEP : Diamond	Savoir aimer
1998	"Chanter"	16	15	-	SNEP : Gold	Savoir aimer
1998	"D'un amour l'autre"	83	-	-	-	Savoir aimer
1998	"Dors"	29	28	-	-	Savoir aimer
1999	"Jolie môme"	13	11	-	-	RéCréation
2000	"Les parfums de sa vie (je l'ai tant aimée)"	38	30	-	-	RéCréation
2000	"Et un jour, une femme"	3	1	-	-	Châtelet Les Halles
2001	"Châtelet Les Halles"	45	5*	-	-	Châtelet Les Halles
2001	"Terre"	37	1*	-	-	Châtelet Les Halles
2002	"L'air du temps" (with Cécilia Cara)	20	19	-	-	2
2003	"Ma liberté de penser"	1	1	8	SNEP : Platinum; BEA : Gold	Ailleurs land
2003	"Je trace"	26	34	65		Ailleurs land
2004	"Y'a pas un homme qui soit né pour ça" (with Calogero und Pascal Obispo)	20	-	45		/
2004	"Io le canto per te"	28	12	-		Baryton
2006	"Là où je t'emmènerai"	4	7	39		Abracadabra
2006	"Le mur"	-	8*	-		Abracadabra
2007	"À tout peser à bien choisir"	-	6*	-		Abracadabra
2007	"Un ami" (with Marc Lavoine)	-	25	-		Marc Lavoine album Les duos de Marc
2008	"La chanson de Jacky"	-	6*	-		Pagny chante Brel
2008	"De part et d'autre"	-	13	-		De part et d'autre – Triple Best of
2009	"C'est comme ça"	-	11	-		C'est comme ça
2009	"Amar y amar"	-	12*	-		C'est comme ça
2010	"Que nadie sepa mi sufrir"	-	17*	-		C'est comme ça
2010	"Si tu n'aimes pas Florent Pagny"	-	46	-		Tout et son contraire
2010	"Te jeter des fleurs"	-	19	-		Tout et son contraire
2011	"8ème merveille"	-	3*	-		Tout et son contraire
2011	"Je laisse le temps faire" (with Pascal Obispo)	-	18*	-		Tout et son contraire
2011	"Tout et son contraire"	-	12*	-		Tout et son contraire
2012	"A la huella a la huella"	-	16*	-		Baryton. Gracias a la vida
2013	"Les murs porteurs"	23	25	-		Vieillir avec toi
2013	"Vieillir avec toi"	68	2*	-		Vieillir avec toi
2013	"Souviens-toi"	147	-	-		Vieillir avec toi
2014	"Le soldat"	61	50	-		Vieillir avec toi
2015	"Nos vies parallèles" (with Anggun)	47	39	-		Toujours un ailleurs
2017	"Le présent d'abord"	38	-	-		
2017	"La beauté du doute"	66	-	-		

*Did not appear in the official Belgian Ultratop 50 charts, but rather in the bubbling under Ultratip charts.

== Filmography ==
Year	Title	Role	Director	Notes
1980	Inspector Blunder	Michel's friend	Claude Zidi	
1987	Les keufs	Jean-Pierre	Josiane Balasko	
1987	François Villon – the vagabond poet	Francois Villon	Sergiu Nicolaescu	

== Awards ==
- Victoires de la Musique Male artist of the year (1998)

Preceded by Charles Aznavour	Victoires de la Musique; Male artist of the year 1998	Succeeded by Alain Bashung
