= Siempre 23 =

Studio album by Jonatan Cerrada
- Released: 23 September 2003 (France)
- Recorded: 2003
- Genre: Pop
- Length: 44:16
- Label: BMG

Jonatan Cerrada chronology
Siempre 23 (2003)	La Preuve du contraire (2005)

Siempre 23 (English: Always 23) is the debut album of the 'A La Recherche De La Nouvelle Star' winner - Jonatan Cerrada. The album is sung in French but some songs show off his Spanish roots. His debut album contains his hit singles "Je voulais te dire que je t'attends", "Rien ne me changera", and "À chaque pas". The album features Lena Ka who duets with him on "Par amour".

Since then Jonatan has released another album La Preuve du contraire.

== Track listing ==
=== First release ===
#	Title	Length
1.	"De ton amour"	3:35
2.	"Rien ne me changera"	3:46
3.	"Je voulais te dire que je t'attends"	4:05
4.	"Siempre mañana"	3:06
5.	"Regarde-moi dans les yeux"	4:02
6.	"Avec toi (je me sens vivre)"	3:41
7.	"Ce qui me tient"	4:07
8.	"Tu es là"	3:24
9.	"Par amour (featuring Lena Ka)"	4:15
10.	"Je souris avec elle"	3:16
11.	"Rien ni personne"	3:43

=== Second release ===
#	Title	Length
1.	"À chaque pas"	3:00
2.	"De ton amour"	3:35
3.	"Rien ne me changera"	3:46
4.	"Je voulais te dire que je t'attends"	4:05
5.	"Siempre mañana"	3:06
6.	"Regarde-moi dans les yeux"	4:02
7.	"Avec toi (je me sens vivre)"	3:41
8.	"Ce qui me tient"	4:07
9.	"Tu es là"	3:24
10.	"Par amour (featuring Lena Ka)"	4:15
11.	"Je souris avec elle"	3:16
12.	"Rien ni personne"	3:43

+ Bonus :

1. Documentaries (Interview, Backstage, ...)
2. "Je voulais te dire que je t'attends" (music video)
3. "Rien ne me changera" (music video)
4. "À chaque pas" (music video)

== Charts ==
Chart (2003)	Peak position
Belgian (Wallonia) Albums Chart	5
French Albums Chart	7
Swiss Albums Chart	52

Year-end chart (2003)	Position
Belgian (Wallonia) Albums Chart	85
French Albums Chart	125
