= Rien ne me changera =

Single by Jonatan Cerrada

from the album Siempre 23
- B-side: "Video"
- Released: 3 November 2003
- Recorded: France
- Genre: Pop
- Length: 3:32
- Label: RCA
- Songwriter(s): Léa Ivanne; Bill Ghiglione
- Producer(s): Ali Boudris

Jonatan Cerrada singles chronology
"Je voulais te dire que je t'attends" (2003)	"Rien ne me changera" (2003)	"À chaque pas" (2004)

"Rien ne me changera" is the second single from the winner of A La Recherche De La Nouvelle Star - Jonatan Cerrada. In English "Rien ne me Changera" means "Nothing Will Change Me". This song features on Jonatan's debut album Siempre 23.

== Track listing ==
CD single

1. "Rien ne me changera" — 3:32
2. "Rien ne me changera" (video)
3. "Je voulais te dire que je t'attends" (video)

== Charts ==
Chart (2003)	Peak position
Belgian (Wallonia) Singles Chart	6
French SNEP Singles Chart	22
Swiss Singles Chart	61
