= Disappearance of Lucas Tronche =

2015 missing child case in France

Lucas Tronche
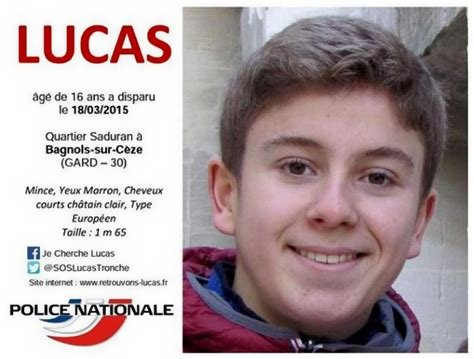
- Born: 18 April 1999
- Disappeared: 18 March 2015 (aged 15); Bagnols-sur-Cèze, France
- Status: Skeletal remains found
- Parents: Éric Tronche (father); Nathalie Tronche (mother)

Lucas Tronche (18 April 1999 – disappeared 18 March 2015) was a French teenager who, at the age of 15, disappeared from his hometown of Bagnols-sur-Cèze in the Gard département of southern France. His skeletal remains were found in June 2021 near his home, in an area where he often went to collect rocks for his hobby in geology. The cause of death remains unknown.

== Biography ==
Lucas Tronche was born on 18 April 1999 and was the second youngest of four brothers. His parents, Nathalie and Éric, are both engineers with the French Alternative Energies and Atomic Energy Commission at the Marcoule Nuclear Site.

Lucas's family and friends describe him as a balanced, rounded, happy, kind and helpful teenager who loves animals and nature and does not like disappointing others. He was described as an ordinary 15-year-old boy with no personal or family issues. He was in his first year of the three-year French high school system at the Lycée Albert Einstein in Bagnols-sur-Cèze. According to teachers, he was a good student and wanted to become a veterinarian. He was introverted, sociable, and passionate about scouting, having been a member of his local scout troop for several years. He was also in badminton and swimming clubs. He rarely used social media but was often on Snapchat. At the time of his disappearance, he and his family were planning a trip to the United States.

== Disappearance ==
At 5.10 pm on Wednesday 18 March 2015, Tronche had planned to go on his kick scooter to a bus stop, where he would take a coach to the public swimming pool in Laudun-l’Ardoise for swimming practice with his 17-year-old brother, Valentin. Valentin left before Lucas, expecting Lucas to join him at the bus stop. Lucas left the family home and locked the door but did not turn up at the bus stop. Valentin attempted to contact Lucas at around 5.30 pm, but Lucas's mobile phone was switched off. Technical analysis would later reveal that Lucas's phone was turned off at 5.14 pm, a few minutes before he left the house. Tronche left without his swimming gear, but did leave with a rucksack containing very few items. He did not take any money, a sleeping bag or a knife with him – items that, as a keen scout with a good knowledge of outdoor survival, he would have known to take if he had been planning to leave home. His intentions after leaving the house remain unknown.

At around 8 pm, Nathalie Tronche went to the bus stop to pick up Valentin and Lucas. Valentin told his mother that Lucas had not come to the swimming pool; Valentin assumed that Lucas had missed the bus and had stayed at home. Nathalie had been at home for the last two hours, so she knew that Lucas was not there. Nathalie contacted A&E to see if Lucas might have been in an accident and gone to hospital. She then contacted Lucas's friends, none of whom knew of his whereabouts. Following that, she contacted the police, who opened a missing persons investigation. Éric Tronche was informed of his son's disappearance when he returned home from work at around 11 pm.

== Investigation ==
The police opened an enquête pour disparition inquiétante (investigation into a concerning disappearance) in the evening of 18 March 2015, immediately after being contacted by Nathalie Tronche. On 25 March, the investigation was handed over to the Montpellier Regional Judicial Police Service (SRPJ) and the Office central pour la répression des violences aux personnes (Central agency for punishing violence against persons, OCRVP). Tronche did not fit the profile of a runaway, and on 30 March, the prosecutor's office in Nîmes opened a judicial investigation into abduction and illegal confinement. Due to Tronche's profile and the lack of supporting evidence, some theories were dismissed, such as suicide and fleeing to the Middle East to fight either for or against the Islamic State.

The police interviewed Tronche's friends, teachers, sports coaches and teammates on multiple occasions, as well as drivers who had passed through Bagnols-sur-Cèze on the day of his disappearance. A formal judicial request was submitted to the United States authorities to access Tronche's conversations and exchanges on Snapchat, which are deleted from the app after a few seconds but remain on Snapchat's servers. The request was granted but the Snapchat activities did not reveal anything of assistance to the investigation. Tronche's computer and tablet were seized and searched, but nothing of any interest was found.

Several witnesses reported seeing a person who may have been Tronche a few hours after his disappearance. A neighbour claimed to have seen Tronche between 5.15 and 5.30 pm on the day of his disappearance, heading down the chemin de Saduran towards the vineyards, in the opposite direction to the swimming pool. 500 metres from that point, another woman reported that at midday on Thursday 19 March, she saw someone who may have been Tronche, crossing a yard in front of her farm. A dog followed the person's scent northwards for 1 kilometre. Also on 19 March, at 6.30 pm, Rachid Ghamri, a Tronche family friend, was out searching with volunteers when he spotted the distant silhouette of a person with a youthful appearance standing at the top of a hill. Ghamri took a photograph, but due to the fact that it was dusk, the photograph was unclear and the person could not be identified. Another team of volunteers later claimed to have seen Tronche in the hills above Saint-Gervais at 10.30 am on Monday 23 March. The person believed to be Tronche was seen watching vineyard workers before disappearing into the woods. A week after the disappearance, a motorcyclist passing through a neighbouring village reported seeing Tronche in the late afternoon of 23 March. The boy was walking with a rucksack along a track towards Esbrezun, a hamlet in the commune of Saint-André-de-Roquepertuis, heading towards a hill. The area was searched by dogs and a helicopter. In a final sighting, a teenage boy and his father reported seeing Tronche on the afternoon of Saturday 28 March in a Cultura shop in Le Pontet, in the Vaucluse département. He was allegedly accompanied by a woman aged 45 to 50. Investigations into this lead proved fruitless.

A few days after Tronche's disappearance, investigators used Luminol – a product that reacts to the presence of blood – to look for potential traces of DNA from Tronche's bedroom and the rest of the house. Some traces of blood were found on the carpet by his bed and were examined to ascertain whether they were blood or simply the Luminol reacting to a household cleaning product. New tests were carried out in May 2017. No results of either test have been released publicly.

In October 2015, seven months after Tronche's disappearance, his parents started receiving strange anonymous letters, informing them that Tronche was in good health and they had no need to worry. A total of eleven letters were sent until the start of summer 2016, when investigators managed to identify the sender thanks to a CCTV camera at the sorting office where one of the letters was posted on 12 July 2016. However, it turned out that the sender was a 57-year-old mythomaniac from Valence who had nothing to do with Tronche's disappearance. In October 2017, he was sentenced by a court in Nîmes to one year's imprisonment, with a further year suspended.

In December 2016, France's National Police released a composite sketch in an attempt to locate a witness seen by a passer-by near Tronche's home on the day of his disappearance. The sketch was modified and made more precise in September 2017.

On 1 March 2016, almost a year after Tronche's disappearance, in Clarensac, a village 62 km (38 miles) from Bagnols-sur-Cèze, 16-year-old Antoine Zoia disappeared after leaving his home at around 1.30 pm. Zoia was a second-year high school student majoring in Science at the Lycée Albert Camus in Nîmes and his personality was considered similar to Tronche's. Zoia was last seen buying a packet of cigarettes from a tobacconist's shop. An investigation was launched to establish whether there could be a link between these two disappearances of teenage boys with similar characteristics from nearby locations in under a year. However, on 2 October 2018, Zoia's skeletonised body was found hanging in a remote wooded area near Clarensac; no foul play was involved in his death.

On 11 January 2018, investigators began examining whether Nordahl Lelandais, the main suspect in the August 2017 disappearance of Maëlys de Araujo, could be linked to both disappearances. Lelandais has regularly been in the Gard and has relatives near Bagnols-sur-Cèze.

On 27 February 2018, he was cleared as a suspect in Tronche's disappearance after analysis of his mobile phone placed him more than 100 miles (160 km) away on the day in question.

On 18 October 2018, the person seen near the bus stop on the day of Tronche's disappearance was located and taken in for questioning, but police said that there was nothing linking him to the disappearance.

== Initiatives and search efforts ==
Tronche's disappearance prompted a national outpouring of emotion and many searches were undertaken by the authorities, Tronche's family, and many private citizens who did not know the family. As early as the day after the disappearance, soldiers patrolled the surrounding areas and organised numerous searches. Hills, cliffs and paths were searched in a 4 km radius of both Tronche's home and the River Cèze. Helicopters with thermal vision, dog teams, and water search and rescue personnel also took part in searches.

Appeals for witnesses have regularly been made and renewed. In the days following Tronche's disappearance, more than 1,500 people took part in searches. Thousands of others shared news on social networks, posting photographs and information along with the slogan “Je cherche Lucas” (“I’m looking for Lucas”). French public figures such as Maurane, Bernard Weber, Jean-Pierre Foucault, Rémi Gaillard and Renan Luce have made public appeals to find Lucas.

In the months following Tronche's disappearance, his parents appeared on many television programmes to spread awareness of the case as widely as possible and to aid the investigation. These programmes included Crimes en direct: Mon enfant a disparu on NRJ 12 with Jean-Marc Morandini in November 2015; Toute une histoire on France 2 with Sophie Davant in January 2016; and Dans les yeux d’Olivier with Olivier Delacroix in September 2017. The case has also been widely reported on television news programmes such as Sept à huit and 13 h 15, le samedi.

Posters have been put up in more than 1,000 towns and cities across France.

In October, the non-profit organisation Retrouvons Lucas (“Let’s Find Lucas”) was created to continue the efforts to find him.

On 19 March 2016, a year and a day after Tronche's disappearance, a balloon release took place in Bagnols-sur-Cèze and about 30 other towns and cities across France.

In May 2016, a major poster campaign was launched in an attempt to locate Tronche. Giant 4-by-3-metre placards were installed on roadsides across the Gard, Drôme and Vaucluse départements. Between August and October 2016, billboard company JCDecaux provided hoardings all around France free of charge to Retrouvons Lucas, the first time such a measure has been taken for a missing person. A 10-second video advertisement was broadcast at service stations across France.

On 18 March 2017, the second anniversary of Tronche's disappearance, a large gathering – which included another balloon release – was held in Bagnols-sur-Cèze, attended by the local mayor. The event also hosted a mannequin challenge, in which more than 200 people participated, to show how time has stopped for Tronche's family ever since the day he disappeared.

== Discovery of bones and DNA test ==
On 24 and 25 June 2021, some bones and pieces of clothing were found in Bagnols-sur-Cèze that were suspected of belonging to Lucas Tronche. DNA and genetic testing were performed which confirmed that they were definitely those of Lucas Tronche.

Passionate about geology, Lucas Tronche regularly went to this area in Bagnols-sur-Cèze to look for stones to collect. The cause of death remains undetermined but possibilities include "an accidental fall, a deliberate act of throwing oneself into the void or an altercation."

== See also ==
- List of people who disappeared mysteriously: post-1970
