= List of Ultratop 40 number-one singles of 2003 =

This is a list of songs that topped the Belgian Walloon (francophone) Ultratop 40 in 2003.

Issue Date	Artist	Title
January 4	Star Academy 2	Paris Latino
January 11	Star Academy 2	Paris Latino
January 18	Star Academy 2	Paris Latino
January 25	Eminem	Lose Yourself
February 1	Eminem	Lose Yourself
February 8	Eminem	Lose Yourself
February 15	Eminem	Lose Yourself
February 22	Panjabi MC	Mundian to Bach Ke
March 1	Alphonse Brown	Le Frunkp
March 8	Alphonse Brown	Le Frunkp
March 15	Alphonse Brown	Le Frunkp
March 22	Alphonse Brown	Le Frunkp
March 29	Alphonse Brown	Le Frunkp
April 5	Nolwenn Leroy	Cassé
April 12	Nolwenn Leroy	Cassé
April 19	Kana	Plantation
April 26	Kana	Plantation
May 3	Kana	Plantation
May 10	Kana	Plantation
May 17	Kana	Plantation
May 24	Florent Pagny	Ma Liberté de penser
May 31	Florent Pagny	Ma Liberté de penser
June 7	Florent Pagny	Ma Liberté de penser
June 14	Lorie	Sur un air latino
June 21	Pascal Obispo	Fan
June 28	Lorie	Sur Un Air Latino
July 5	Lorie	Sur Un Air Latino
July 12	Lorie	Sur Un Air Latino
July 19	Lorie	Sur Un Air Latino
July 26	The Underdog Project & The Sunclub	Summer Jam 2003
August 2	Jonatan Cerrada	Je voulais te dire que je t'attends
August 9	Jonatan Cerrada	Je voulais te dire que je t'attends
August 16	Jonatan Cerrada	Je voulais te dire que je t'attends
August 23	The Underdog Project & The Sunclub	Summer Jam 2003
August 30	The Underdog Project & The Sunclub	Summer Jam 2003
September 6	The Underdog Project & The Sunclub	Summer Jam 2003
September 13	Diam's	DJ
September 20	Diam's	DJ
September 27	Diam's	DJ
October 4	Jocelyne Labylle, Cheela, Jacob Desvarieux & Passi	Laisse Parler Les Gens
October 11	Jocelyne Labylle, Cheela, Jacob Desvarieux & Passi	Laisse Parler Les Gens
October 18	Star Academy 3	La Bamba
October 25	Star Academy 3	La Bamba
November 1	Star Academy 3	La Bamba
November 8	Star Academy 3	La Bamba
November 15	Tragédie	Hey Oh
November 22	Tragédie	Hey Oh
November 29	Tragédie	Hey Oh
December 6	Tragédie	Hey Oh
December 13	Tragédie	Hey Oh
December 20	Tragédie	Hey Oh
December 27	Tragédie	Hey Oh

== Best-selling singles ==
This is the ten best-selling/performing singles in 2003.

Pos.	Artist	Title	HP	Weeks
1	Alphone Brown	"Le Frunkp"	1	22
2	The Underdog Project & The Sunclub	"Summer Jam 2003"	1	23
3	Diam's	"DJ"	1	24
4	Jonatan Cerrada	"Je voulais te dire que je t'attends"	1	19
5	Kana	"Plantation"	1	20
6	Lorie	"Sur un air latino"	1	23
7	Eminem	"Lose Yourself"	1	21
8	Booming People	"Chihuahua"	2	25
9	Nolwenn Leroy	"Cassé"	1	13
10	Blue featuring Elton John	"Sorry Seems to Be the Hardest Word"	4	23

== See also ==
- 2003 in music
