= Childerich =

Childerich may refer to:

- Childeric (disambiguation), any of several Frankish kings
- Childerich, a Suikoden V character, see: List of Suikoden V characters#Childerich
