= TV6 (French TV channel) =

Former French television channel (1986–1987)

Coordinates: 48°52′22.534″N 2°17′50.676″E

- Logo used from 1 March 1986 to 28 February 1987.
- Country: France
- Headquarters: 133, avenue des Champs-Elysées; 75008 Paris

Programming
- Picture format: 576i SDTV

History
- Launched: 1 March 1986
- Founder: Léo Scheer
- Closed: 28 February 1987 (364 days)
- Replaced by: M6

TV6 (Télévision 6) was a French private and free national television channel dedicated to music and youth, created on 1 March 1986. Following the 1986 French legislative election, the new opposition government reallocated its slot to M6, leading to its shutdown exactly a year later on 28 February 1987, becoming the first French national television channel to permanently cease broadcasting (five years before La Cinq). M6 took over its frequencies on the following morning of 1 March 1987.

Despite its short-lived broadcast period, TV6 left its mark on the television genre with personalities such as Jean-Luc Delarue, Childéric Muller and Alain Maneval and a new tone, inventing the "free antenna" and music TV.

== History ==
In November 1984, Léo Scheer, who designed and developed Canal+, left Havas and André Rousselet to join Publicis and Maurice Levy to implement a new commercial television project in partnership with Europe 1 Communications.

In 1985, a little over a year before the parliamentary elections in France, the ruling left feared failure and wanted to create a new space, outside the institutional domain of public television, that would reach a large audience (unlike Canal+ encrypted) and provide an opinion relay for its ideas if it were to return to the opposition. The President of the Republic, François Mitterrand, then launched the idea of "an additional space of freedom" in a television interview on January 16 and asked Laurent Fabius' government to study the project. Lawyer Jean-Denis Bredin, commissioned by the Prime Minister to write a report on the opening of the "television space to private television", presented it to him on 20 May. It recommended the creation of two national private free-to-air television channels financed by advertising and whose frequencies would be granted by the State in accordance with Article 79 of the Law of 29 July 1982 on audiovisual communication. On 31 July, Georges Fillioud, French Minister of State for Communication Techniques, presented a communication on the development of the audiovisual sector to the Council of Ministers. He announced a bill defining the creation by the spring of 1986 of two new private television channels with national broadcasting, one generalist, the other with a musical vocation, as well as local television channels, in the capital of which would be press groups, production, and advertising companies. Under the guise of an open audiovisual landscape, the choice of formats betrayed the political ulterior motives of the government project, with the generalist channel being able to become an excellent opinion relay for the entire population in the event of electoral defeat, and the music channel a relay more specifically geared towards young people, an important source of voice for the Socialist Party.

Following the government's decision to create two new private national television channels and no longer just one, Léo Scheer and the producer of Les Enfants du Rock, Jean-Martial Lefranc, were developing, under the direction of Maurice Lévy, the project for a television channel adapted to a new wireless network, targeted at young people. Publicis, the largest advertising agency in Europe, then changed partners for its commercial television project and joined forces with the leaders in communication and the music industry such as NRJ, Gaumont, the Gilbert Gross communication agency and the three music publishing majors, Polygram, Sony and Virgin. This group, which in its form met the conditions laid down by the government's draft law, submitted its application for a public service concession contract to the High Authority for Audiovisual Communication. The project was simply called TV6, after almost being called TNT, Turbo 6, V 6, MV 6, Super 6 or NRJ 6.

Three projects were competing for the award of the sixth network concession: CLT, the unsuccessful candidate for the fifth channel, which was still seeking to establish RTL Television in France, the Publicis/Gaumont/NRJ/Gilbert Gross consortium, and the Hit FM/RSCG consortium led by the incumbent's favourite advertiser, Jacques Séguéla. On 28 January 1986, the government chose TV6, a company led by Publicis, to create the first French television channel devoted to youth and music. The 18-year public service concession contract between the State and TV6 was signed on the same day and the decree approving the contract and the specifications of the sixth channel was published on February 21. The channel was required to devote at least 50% of its broadcasting time to music and, contrary to the specifications of La Cinq, was subject to the same obligations as public channels for the time between theatrical release and film screening and the quotas for broadcasting French films. It was also required to broadcast 350 hours of its own productions in the first year and produce 100 video clips.

After the looping of a trailer on 22 February 1986, on TDF's new sixth terrestrial network, TV6, France's leading music television channel, began broadcasting on Saturday, 1 March 1986, at 2:00 PM. Faithful to its target audience, it called itself the youngest TV channel and devoted itself entirely to contemporary music. Each of the project's partners contributed to the project: Gaumont brought its catalog of films and television series, NRJ its animators and musical know-how and Publicis taking charge of the channel's management and advertising management. As a private commercial channel, TV6 would broadcast two minutes of advertising every twenty minutes.

Following the 1986 French legislative election, the right, led by Jacques Chirac, established the first cohabitative government in the history of the Fifth Republic. Chirac asked his new Minister of Communication, François Léotard, to implement the government's audiovisual policy—the privatisation of TF1 and cancellation of the concessions of the two new private channels, La Cinq and TV6, which were too quickly awarded on pressure from the Élysée without a real call for tenders. By Decree No. 86-901, of 30 July 1986, Chirac's government decided to reallocate TV6's slot before the end of its concession. Following an appeal by TV6, this decree was annulled by decision of the Conseil d'État on 2 February 1987, because the Minister had not respected the legal deadline of the one-year concession. However, on 15 January 1987, the Commission nationale de la communication et des libertés (CNCL), which succeeded the Haute Autorité de la communication audiovisuelle on 30 September 1986, set out the general and specific obligations of "private national free-to-air terrestrial television" in Decisions No. 87-1 and 87–2. On 2 February 1987, Decree No. 87-51 terminated the concession contract for the sixth channel, which was due to expire at midnight on 28 February 1987, and at the same time opened the call for applications for the reallocation of the network. The CNCL was hearing the Métropole Télévision (M6) project presented by Lyonnaise des Eaux in partnership with CLT, the producer Marin Karmitz (MK2) and the press group Amaury, the Télé Fiction Musique group, as well as TV6, candidate for its own succession.

In an attempt to thwart the M6 proposal, which was favoured by the government (Chirac having already promised the sixth channel to his friend Jérôme Monod, CEO of Lyonnaise des Eaux, as well as to CLT against an agreement on the Luxembourg vote on the common agricultural policy), Publicis then negotiated with Lyonnaise des Eaux to make a new round table involving both new and old operators, as Silvio Berlusconi had done a few days earlier with Robert Hersant for La Cinq. However, the negotiations did not succeed and at the end of February, the CNCL allocated the sixth channel slot to M6. Serge Gainsbourg, Johnny Hallyday, Eddy Mitchell and other personalities, called on the government in vain to try to save TV6.

On 28 February 1987, with its one-year concession not renewed, TV6's headquarters were stormed by young fans who invaded the Champs-Élysées and improvised a demonstration with artists such as Francis Lalanne, Marc Lavoine, Mylène Farmer and Patrick Bruel. Childéric Muller, a star of the channel, had to climb a tree with a megaphone to disperse the crowd at the end of the demonstration. TV6's final broadcast took place that evening from the set of the Tam-Tam show installed at VCF in Saint-Cloud in the presence of many artists and the channel's hosts (Smicky, Jean-Luc Delarue, Isabelle Duhamel, Frédéric Smektala, Frédéric de Rieux, Childeric Muller and Alain Maneval who carried a sign with the words "y'en a qu'une, c'est la 6", a reference to TF1's then-slogan). The programme ended with a Star Wars parody clip in which Darth Vader (symbolizing the new right-wing government) congratulates himself on the victory of the Empire (the Lyonnaise des Eaux/CLT group) over the rebellion (TV6 owned by Publicis/NRJ), and shoots a floating TV6 television, causing it to explode. The next day, 1 March 1987, M6 took over at 11:15 AM, on the same frequencies where its predecessor had turned off its transmitters at midnight.

Benefiting from a network of transmitters mainly located in the major urban basins of France, M6 would nevertheless have to retain in its programming a certain musical dominance, inherited from TV6.

== Organization ==
=== Executives ===
President

- Maurice Lévy

General director

- Léo Scheer (Designer and operational manager of TV6)

Deputy general director

- Jean-Martial Lefranc

Director of programming

- Patrice Blanc-Francard

=== Capital ===
TV6's share capital was FRF 10,000,000,000, 25% held by Publicis, 25% by Gaumont, 18% by NRJ, 12% by Gilbert Gross, and the remaining 20% being divided between management, private individuals and the 'three majors' of music publishing: Polygram, Sony and Virgin.

=== Headquarters ===
TV6's registered office was located at 133 avenue des Champs-Elysées in the 8th arrondissement of Paris, the headquarters of its main shareholder Publicis.

== Programming ==
From March to September 1986, TV6 opened its antenna every day at 2:00 PM and broadcast until midnight a schedule containing only music programs. From 25 October 1986, TV6 began broadcasting television series and a soap opera, as well as films, mainly from the Gaumont catalog and selected by Gérard Jourd'hui. TV6 tried to differentiate itself from its competitors by the editorial choice made for films and series that could not be seen elsewhere.

Dominique Duforest was in charge of selecting the video clips and their programming and on-air packaging. The musical jingles were made by producer-arranger Jean-Pierre Castelain.

TV series are marked in green; TV movies in pink; shows in golden brown and movies in brown. The ® corresponds to the reruns. The first one is for March 1986; the second one was used from October 1986 to February 1987.

	14:00	17:00	18:00	19:00	20:00	21:00	22:00	00:00
Monday	6 Tonic	Magic 6	Système 6	NRJ 6	Profil 6	Concert sur la 6	6 Tonic	End of programming
Tuesday	6 Tonic	Magic 6	Système 6	NRJ 6	6 Best	Concert sur la 6	6 Tonic	End of programming
Wednesday	6 Tonic	Magic 6	Système 6	NRJ 6	Sixties		6 Tonic	End of programming
Thursday	6 Tonic	Magic 6	Système 6	NRJ 6	6 sur 6	Concert sur la 6	6 Tonic	End of programming
Friday	6 Tonic	Magic 6	Système 6	NRJ 6	Chance 6	Concert sur la 6	6 Tonic	End of programming
Saturday	6 Tonic	Magic 6	Système 6	NRJ 6 Super 6		Concert sur la 6	6 Tonic	End of programming
Sunday	6 Tonic	Magic 6	Système 6	Euro 6 or US 6		Concert sur la 6	6 Tonic	End of programming

	14:00	17:00	18:00	18:30	19:00	19:30	20:00	20:25	20:30	21:30	22:00	22:30	23:00	00:00	01:00
Monday	6 Tonic	Système 6			NRJ 6	Le Temps des copains	Max la Menace	Les Bons Plans d'Actuel	Les Envahisseurs	Superminds	NRJ 6 ®	6 Tonic ®			End of programming
Tuesday	6 Tonic	Système 6			NRJ 6	Le Temps des copains	Max la Menace	Les Bons Plans d'Actuel	Film		NRJ 6 ®	6 Tonic ®			End of programming
Wednesday	6 Tonic	Système 6			NRJ 6	Le Temps des copains	Max la Menace	Les Bons Plans d'Actuel	Sixties					6 Tonic ®	End of programming
Thursday	6 Tonic	Système 6			NRJ 6	Le Temps des copains	Max la Menace	Les Bons Plans d'Actuel	Film		?		Profil 6	6 Tonic ®	End of programming
Friday	6 Tonic	Système 6			NRJ 6	Le Temps des copains	Max la Menace	Les Bons Plans d'Actuel	Live 6		Côté-courts		6 Tonic ®		End of programming
Saturday	6 Tonic	Les catcheurs du rock	Tam-Tam			Le Temps des copains	Une page de pub		Insiders	No Soap, Radio		Alfred Hitchcock présente	6 Tonic ®		End of programming
Sunday	6 Tonic	6 Tonic	?	Play 6	Métal 6		Les Globe-trotters		Film		6 Tonic ®				End of programming

- "The youngest of all TV channels": this slogan referred to its youth-based target audience and the fact that it was the newest television channel in France.

== Presenters ==
- Jacques Colin
- Cookie
- Alain Maneval
- Bintou Simpore
- Childeric Muller
- Dominique Duforest
- Frédéric Derieux
- Frédéric Smektala
- Francis Zégut
- Isabelle Duhamel
- Jean-Luc Delarue
- Olivier Dorangeon
- Philippe Vandel
- Smicky

== Diffusion ==
TV6 was broadcast on TDF's new sixth analog terrestrial network, which, at its creation, reached only 7,600,000 viewers with 9 low-power transmitters broadcasting to major cities. As broadcasts were retransmitted in SECAM with "line identification" to facilitate the transmission of new TV services of the time (Teletext, VPS, etc.), several households had to change antennas (Broadband) or TV receivers as a result of incompatibilities with the historical SECAM "frame identification" format (SECAM bottles (archive)) resulting in a black and white image on the stations concerned. These technical developments were to some extent an obstacle to the deployment of the sixth channel network in the country. As a private channel, TV6 had to finance the new transmitters installed by TDF, with the help of some local authorities wishing to meet the expectations of their citizens.

TV6 was also relayed throughout France via the Telecom 1B satellite, which, thanks to La Cinq, would promote the deployment of parabolic equipment in France.

== Audience ==
In 1987, TV6 reached more than ten million households (covering the Île-de-France, Lyon and Marseille regions). However, its launch was compromised due to technical difficulties in receiving it, with its transmitters less powerful than those of TF1, Antenne 2, FR3, Canal+, and La Cinq. Due to the absence of a reliable audience measurement concerning it at the time (the audience rating did not concern La Cinq or TV6), the press and the media had treated it as marginal. Finally, the powerful cable television lobby (Lyonnaise des Eaux, Compagnie générale des eaux, France Télécom), seeing in it a national thematic channel likely to hinder its development, did everything to minimize its success. From the beginning, the channel had a daily audience of 500,000 viewers, representing 0.3% of the audience, mainly teenagers. After a year of broadcasts, more than 14 million French people had heard of TV6.

== See also ==
- Publicis
- Gaumont
- NRJ Group
- Virgin
- NRJ 12
