= Thierry Amiel =

French singer and songwriter

- Born: 18 October 1982 (age 43)
- Origin: France
- Genres: Pop
- Instrument: vocals
- Years active: 2003–present
- Labels: RCA (Sony BMG)
- Website: thierryamiel.com

Thierry Amiel (born 18 October 1982) is a French singer and songwriter from Marseille, France. He rose to fame after coming in second place to Jonatan Cerrada on the first edition of the French Pop Idol, À la Recherche de la Nouvelle Star.

== Biography ==
Thierry grew up in Auriol, a town in Bouches-du-Rhône. Keen on music from a young age, in 2001 he quit his studies in Psychology and tried unsuccessfully for both Rêve d'un soir and Popstars 2. His break came in 2003 when he competed in A La Recherche De La Nouvelle Star, losing narrowly in the final round. Shortly afterwards, his first album Paradoxes, along with his first single, Les Mots Bleus, were released, Paradoxes coming 3rd in the top 50 albums of its opening week. After three years, Thierry released his second album on the 20 November 2006, titled eponymously Thierry Amiel. The album gained 16th place in the top selling albums of France, with the single Cœur Sacré peaking at 6th place in top singles.

On 1 September 2007, Thierry competed in the Sopot Festival 2007 in Poland, representing France; his rivals were other music stars like: Sophie Ellis-Bextor, September, The Cloud Room and Monrose. He placed third.

In 2010, Thierry was chosen to play the lead role of Adam, in the musical comedy, Adam et Eve, La Seconde Chance (Adam and Eve, the Second Chance), by Pascal Obispo. The comedy was scheduled for performances from 31 January 2012 to 25 March 2012 at the Palais des Sports in Paris. The show would then tour at various venues in France beginning in September 2012, before finally completing its run in Brussels, Belgium in January 2013.

On 12 January 2012 LaProvence.com published an article stating that Thierry Amiel had won a popularity contest over rugby player, Alexis Palisson, during "Le Match Sportifs contre People 2011" (2011 Match against Sportsmen). Voting took place over the internet from 14 December 2011, until the final showdown ending at midnight on 11 January 2012. Thierry won with 80% of the vote.

The tour of the musical Adam et Eve, La Seconde Chance, was abruptly canceled in August 2012, with the following explanation given: “The company Adam & Eve Production has decided to cancel the tour of the musical of the same name. The deterioration of the economic climate unfortunately does not produce the show to date, with the same level of artistic quality and requirement has been proposed with success at the Palais des Sports in Paris from 31 January to 25 March 2012”.

In May 2013 Thierry revealed that he has been quietly working on titles for his 4th album with help from composer-producer, Axelle Renoir.

After an absence of 7 years, Thierry released "Artéfact", his 4th album, to great acclaim on 27 September 2019. Thus far, the album has been very well received. Thierry continues to give interviews to promote his new, self-produced album.

== Discography ==
=== Albums ===
13 October 2003: Paradoxes (#3 FR)

20 November 2006: Thierry Amiel (#16 FR)

24 May 2010: Où vont les histoires?

27 September 2019: Artéfact

=== Singles ===
20 August 2003 : Les mots bleus (#5 FR)

25 November 2003 : Je regarde là-haut (#47 FR)

18 May 2004 : Un jour arrive

18 September 2006: Cœur Sacré (#6 FR)

17 June 2007: De là haut

5 November 2007: L'amour en face

23 November 2009: Où vont les histoires ?

=== Music Videos ===
Détends-toi

Fantôme

Les mots bleus

Je regarde là-haut

Un jour arrive

Cœur Sacré

De là haut (Version Alternative)

Où vont les histoires? (TV Version)

Où vont les histoires?
