= France in the Eurovision Song Contest 2004 =

- Eurovision Song Contest 2004
- Participating broadcaster: France Télévisions
- Country: France
- Selection process: Internal selection
- Announcement date: Artist: 9 February 2004; Song: 10 March 2004

Competing entry
- Song: "À chaque pas"
- Artist: Jonatan Cerrada
- Songwriters: Ben "Jammin" Robbins; Steve Balsamo; Jonatan Cerrada

Placement
- Final result: 15th, 40 points

Participation chronology

France was represented at the Eurovision Song Contest 2004 with the song "À chaque pas", written by Ben "Jammin" Robbins, Steve Balsamo, and Jonatan Cerrada, and performed by Cerrada himself. The French participating broadcaster France Télévisions internally selected its entry for the contest. The broadcaster announced Jonatan Cerrada as its representative on 9 February 2004 and later the song "Laissez-moi le temps" as its entry on 11 February 2004. On 22 February 2004, France Télévisions announced that Cerrada would perform a new song at Eurovision and "À chaque pas" was presented to the public as the new entry during a live performance by Cerrada on 22 March 2004 during the France 3 programme Symphonic Show.

As a member of the "Big Four", France automatically qualified to compete in the final of the Eurovision Song Contest. Performing in position 4, France placed fifteenth out of the 24 participating countries with 40 points.

== Background ==
Prior to the 2004 Contest, France Télévisions and its predecessor national broadcasters, have participated in the Eurovision Song Contest representing France forty-six times since RTF's debut in the inaugural contest. They first won the contest in 1958 with "Dors, mon amour" performed by André Claveau. In the 1960s, they won three times, with "Tom Pillibi" performed by Jacqueline Boyer in 1960, "Un premier amour" performed by Isabelle Aubret in 1962, and "Un jour, un enfant" performed by Frida Boccara, who won in 1969 in a four-way tie with the Netherlands, Spain, and the United Kingdom. Their fifth – and so far latest – victory came in 1977 with "L'oiseau et l'enfant" performed by Marie Myriam. France has also finished second four times, with Paule Desjardins in 1957, Catherine Ferry in 1976, Joëlle Ursull in 1990, and Amina in 1991 (who lost out to Sweden's Carola in a tie-break). In the 21st century, it has making the top ten two times, with "Je n'ai que mon âme" performed by Natasha St-Pier finishing fourth in 2001 and "Il faut du temps" by Sandrine François finishing fifth in 2002. In 2003, "Monts et merveilles" performed by Louisa Baïleche finished in eighteenth place.

As part of its duties as participating broadcaster, France Télévisions organises the selection of its entry in the Eurovision Song Contest and broadcasts the event in the country through France 3. The French broadcasters had used both national finals and internal selection to choose their entries in the past. From 2001 and 2003, the broadcaster opted to internally select its entry, a procedure that was continued in order to select its 2004 entry.

== Before Eurovision ==
=== Internal selection ===
France Télévisions announced in early 2004 that it would select its entry for the Eurovision Song Contest 2004 internally. On 9 February 2004, the broadcaster announced that its representative for the 2004 contest would be Belgian singer Jonatan Cerrada. Information that Cerrada would represent France at the contest was leaked on 24 January 2004 by French newspaper France Dimanche following his win at the first season of the singing competition Nouvelle Star.

Jonatan Cerrada's song "Laissez-moi le temps", written by Shayane, was presented to the public on 11 February 2004 during a concert which was held at the L'Olympia in Paris. On 22 February 2004, France Télévisions announced that "Laissez-moi le temps" would be replaced as they did not find the song strong enough for the contest. The replacement song "À chaque pas", written by Ben "Jammin" Robbins, Steve Balsamo and Jonatan Cerrada and containing lyrics in a bilingual mix of French and Spanish, was previewed online on 10 March 2004 and formally presented to the public on 22 March 2004 during the France 3 programme Symphonic Show, hosted by Évelyne Thomas.

== At Eurovision ==
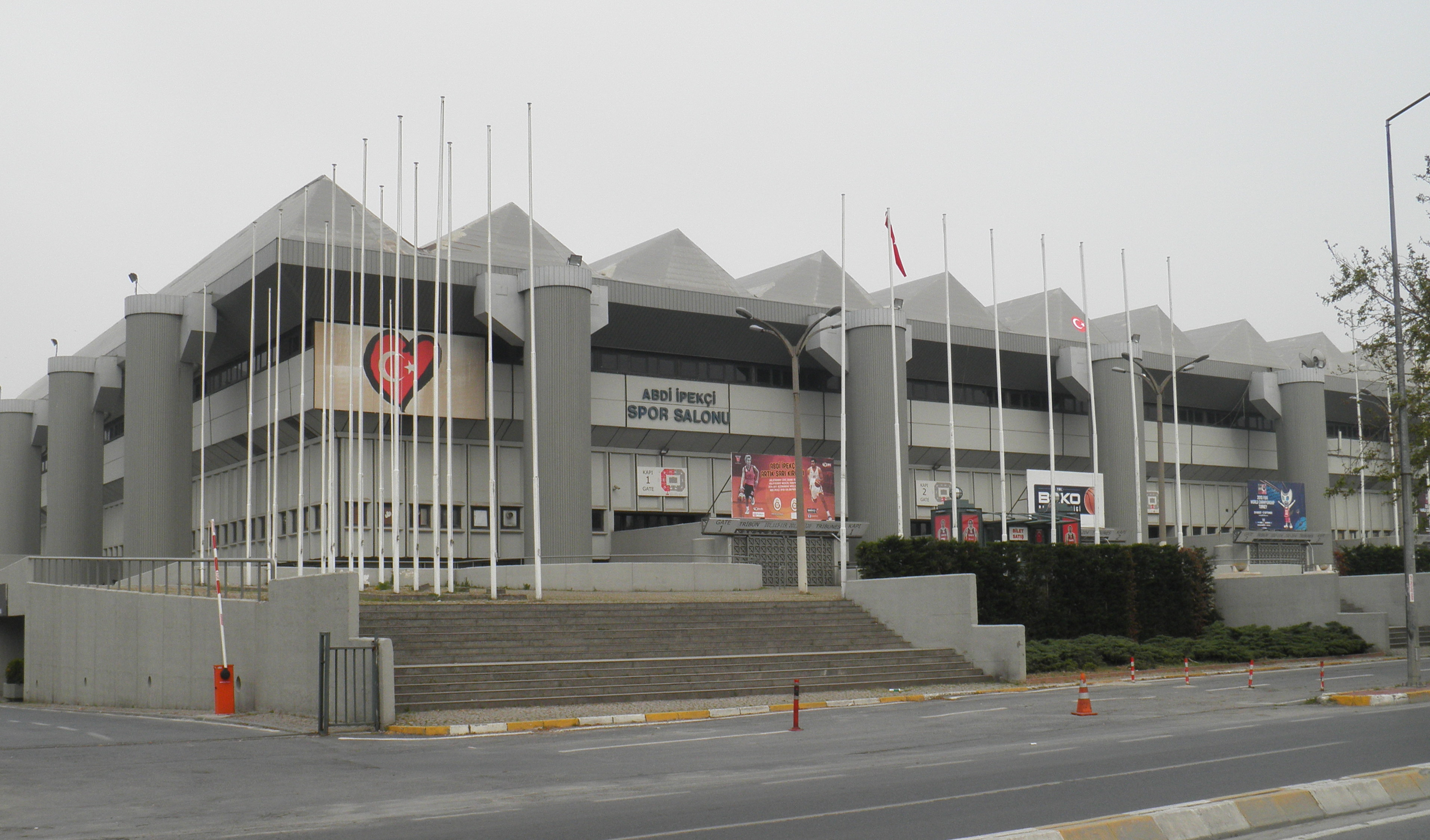
The Eurovision Song Contest 2004 took place at the Abdi İpekçi Arena in Istanbul, Turkey

It was announced that the competition's format would be expanded to include a semi-final in 2004. According to the rules, all nations with the exceptions of the host country, the "Big Four" (France, Germany, Spain, and the United Kingdom) and the ten highest placed finishers in the 2003 contest are required to qualify from the semi-final on 12 May 2004 in order to compete for the final; the top ten countries from the semi-final progress to the final. As a member of the "Big Four", France automatically qualified to compete in the final on 15 May 2004.

Only the final of the contest was broadcast on France 3 with commentary by Laurent Ruquier and Elsa Fayer, as well as via radio on France Bleu with commentary by Jean-Luc Delarue. As France did not broadcast the semi-final, the nation did not participate in the voting during the show.

=== Final ===
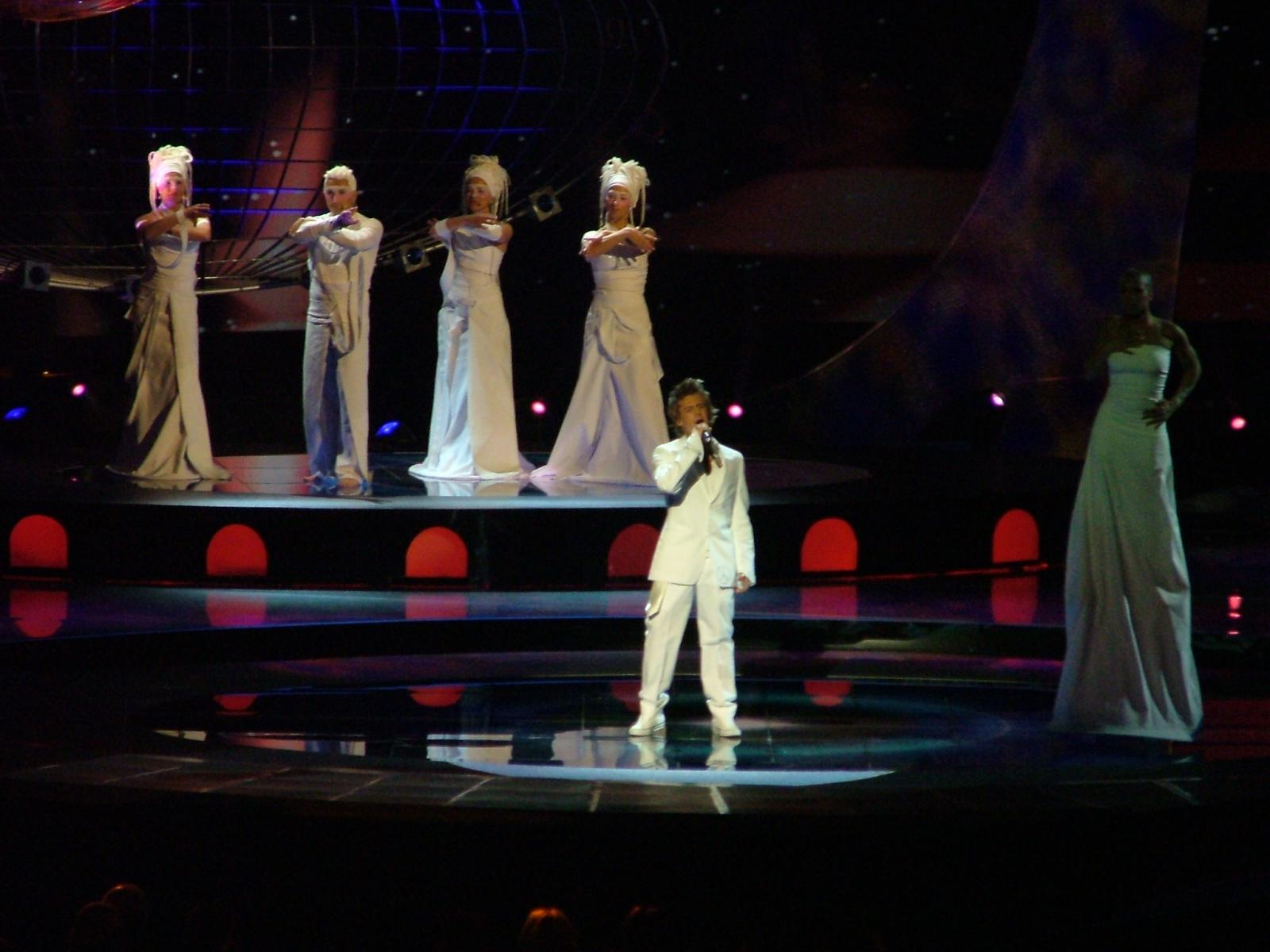
Jonatan Cerrada during a rehearsal before the final

Jonatan Cerrada took part in technical rehearsals on 9 and 10 May, followed by dress rehearsals on 14 and 15 May. During the running order draw for the semi-final and final on 23 March 2004, France was placed to perform in position 4 in the final, following the entry from Norway and before the entry from Serbia and Montenegro.

The French performance featured Jonatan Cerrada on stage dressed in a white suit and performing the song with a stilted dancer, Tatiana Seguin. The stage colours were predominantly white and two helium filled balloons, one on the arena ceiling and one on the big dome shaped stage, were displayed during the performance. The performance was directed by Kamel Ouali who based the idea of the act around The Little Prince novella. Jonatan Cerrada was also joined on stage by four backing vocalists: Elisabet Baile, Labila Mokedem, Caroline Pascaud and Michel Cerroni. France placed fifteenth in the final, scoring 40 points. France Télévisions appointed Alex Taylor as its spokesperson to announce the results of the French televote during the final.

=== Voting ===
Below is a breakdown of points awarded to France and awarded by France in the grand final of the contest. The nation awarded its 12 points to Turkey in the final of the contest.

Following the release of the televoting figures by the EBU after the conclusion of the competition, it was revealed that a total of 54,495 televotes were cast in France during the final.

Points awarded to France (Final)
Score	Country
12 points	Monaco
10 points	Belgium
8 points	
7 points	Andorra
6 points	
5 points	
4 points	Russia; Spain
3 points	
2 points	Portugal
1 point	Albania

Points awarded by France (Final)
Score	Country
12 points	Turkey
10 points	Serbia and Montenegro
8 points	Spain
7 points	Germany
6 points	Greece
5 points	Cyprus
4 points	Austria
3 points	Sweden
2 points	Ukraine
1 point	Albania
