= Childéric Muller =

French television host (born 1963)

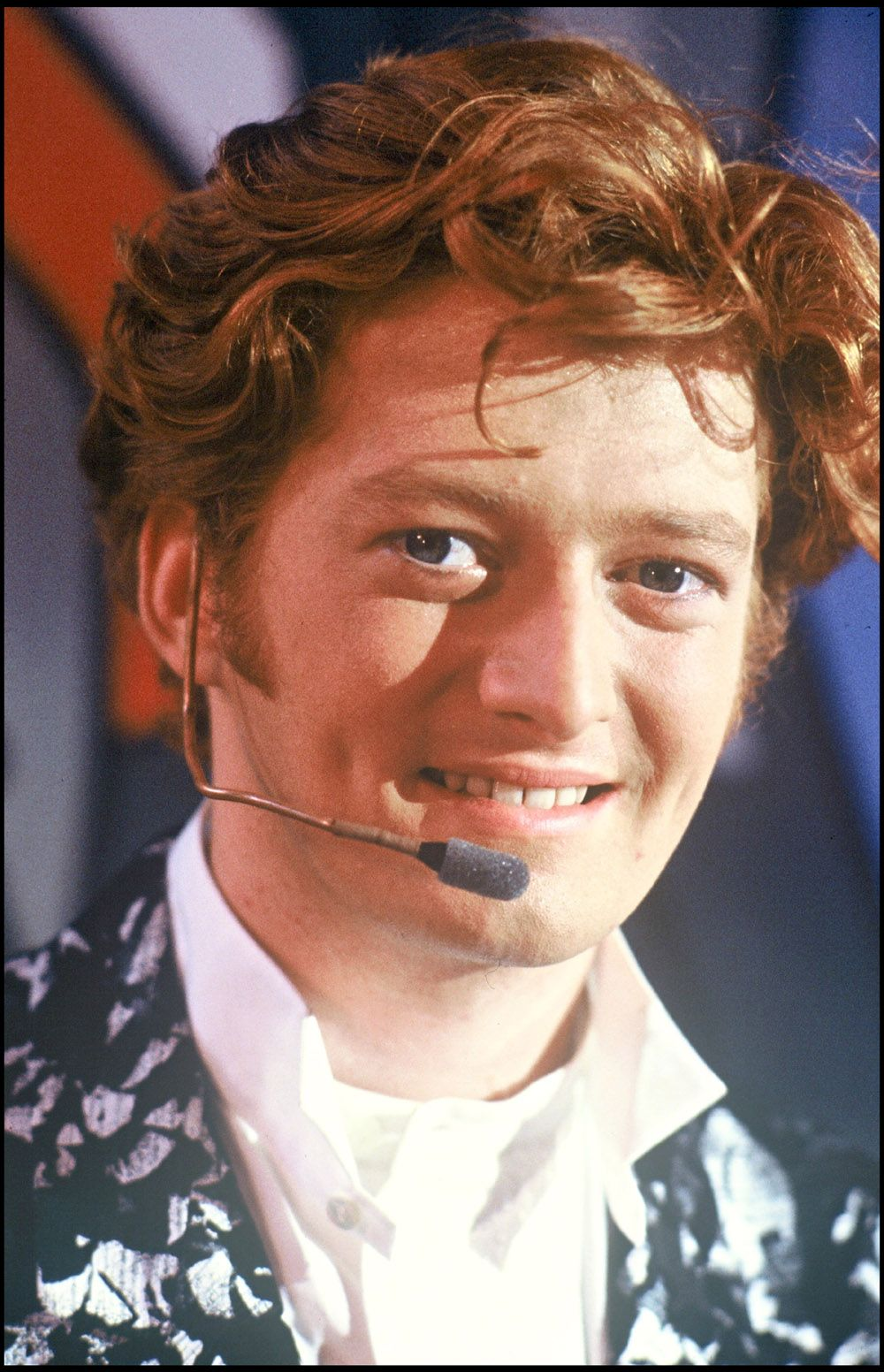
- Childéric Muller in 1988.
- Born: Childéric-Jerome Muller; April 3, 1963 (age 63); Marseille, France
- Occupations: Television producer and politician; former television and radio host
- Works: Skyrock (radio) RMC (France)
- Television: System 6 TV6 (France) Childeric on Channel 5 (France) Les Enfants du rock France 2
- Website: https://archive.today/20130703130328/http://www.wmaker.net/waitv/Childeric-Muller-Auteur-Producteur-executif_a32.html

Childéric Muller (born 3 April 1963 in Marseille, France) is a French television producer and former television host. He was elected a town councillor of Marseille in March 2008. As a producer and media entrepreneur, he contributed to TV programs across Europe. Since 2000, he has run his own production company, Waï TV. Since 2014 he is a member of the cabinet of the city of Marseille.

== Biography ==
=== Early life and education ===
Muller was born and raised in Marseille. At 16, he began working for the local Radio Star station and wrote his first articles for local newspapers such as La Provence.

In 1982, Muller moved to Paris to study journalism. There, he continued to host radio shows and to write articles for the national newspapers Le Matin de Paris and VSD. In 1983, he was hired by Antenne 2 as a scientific journalist. In 1985, he helped found the national radio network Skyrock.

He studied journalism, communications, and media business management at Paris Dauphine University, and law at Paris-Nanterre University.

=== TV and radio career ===
Muller became famous in the 1980s as a radio and TV host whose shows helped introduce New Wave and pop rock music to the French public. In 1985, he began producing and hosting specials—on The Cure, Indochine, and Sade Adu, for example—for the show Les Enfants du Rock on National Broadcaster France2 reaching an average 15 million viewers. At the same time, he worked on La Voix du Lézard and helped found Skyrock. The TV6 network hired him to present the daily talk show Systeme 6. He in turn hired many newcomers to work under him, including Jean-Luc Delarue and Charlotte Valandrey.

By 1987, he managed daily shows on the RMC radio station and La Cinq television network, featuring musicians and bands such as The Cure, James Brown, Elton John, Patrick Bruel, and Serge Gainsbourg.

From 1987 to 1989, he launched Carte Jeunes for the French youth and sports ministry, which gained more than one million subscribers ages 15 to 24. In the same period, he acted in movies and was a guest on a few music records. In the summer of 1987, he ran a live music tour, presenting various French bands every night in different cities: 35 shows in front of a more than 300.000 people (audience).

In 1991, Muller got married and stopped hosting programs to concentrate on producing.

=== Producer career ===
In 1991, Muller started producing shows for TMC and TF1, with Guillaume Durand and Patrick Sébastien as hosts. In 1993, he joined the Reg Grundy Organisation as general manager of Grundy Television (which was later acquired by Pearson Television and changed its name to FremantleMedia in 1999). He created or produced shows in Spain, Italy, the United Kingdom, and Latin America, among other places, and rose to become chief executive officer of Grundy France by the end of 1999 before founding his own company, Waï TV. Waï produced prime-time shows such as Printemps des Poètes and Code de la route, le grand examen, hosted by Patrice Laffont and Gaël Leforestier. Waï TV then adapted the format, with similar success, in other countries, including the United Kingdom and Israel. Many other shows based on Muller's format have been co-produced by Carlton Granada on ITV1, among them The Great British Pop Test and The Great British Spelling Test.

Muller continued to produce TV shows even after his political election in Marseille.

=== Political career ===
In the French legislative election of 2007, Muller was the Marseille candidate of the Union for French Democracy and the Democratic Movement. He finished third with 2,343 votes, behind the conservative Union for a Popular Movement and the Socialist Party, but ahead of the National Front.

In 2007, he took charge of the communication commission for François Bayrou and the Democratic Movement. In 2008, he was elected to the Marseille municipal council. He was also elected president and national councillor of the Democratic Movement for the Marseille area.

Since April 2014, he has been a special councillor to Jean-Claude Gaudin, the mayor of Marseille and a member of the French cabinet.
