= Hilderic (disambiguation) =

Hilderic is a masculine Germanic given name that may refer to:

- Hilderic, penultimate king of the Vandals and Alans (523–33)
- Hilderic of Nîmes, Visigothic count (fl. 672)
- Hilderic of Spoleto, Lombard duke (739–740)
- Hilderic of Farfa, abbot (842–57)

== See also ==
- Childeric (disambiguation), various uses of an earlier Frankish spelling of this name
