= Évelyne Thomas =

French journalist and television presenter

- Born: 10 January 1964 (age 62); Périgueux, Dordogne, France
- Occupations: Journalist, television presenter
- Years active: 1986–present (television)
- Notable credit: C'est mon choix
- Television: France 3 (1999–2004, 2011–13); Téva (2009–13); TF1 (1996, 2004–05); RTL9 (2009); Direct 8 (2006)

Évelyne Thomas (born 10 January 1964) is a French journalist and television presenter, mostly known to present the television program C'est mon choix.

== Life and career ==
=== Early life and beginnings ===
Évelyne Thomas was born in Périgueux in the department of Dordogne. She graduated with a Master of Advanced Studies in international law. She began her career in written press in 1984 for the daily newspaper Nord Matin, especially as a justice columnist specialized in affairs at the Cour d'assises. She stayed there until 1986 and then joined television on the regional channel France 3 Nord-Pas-de-Calais as a reporter for the daily news and political, economical and European programs of the redaction until 1989. She then became presenter and co-producer of Doigts dans la prise, a weekly program about new tendencies. From 1988 to 1992, Évelyne Thomas presented the regional evening news on France 3 Nord-Pas-de-Calais.

In 1992, Évelyne Thomas joined the channel France 3 Paris Île-de-France, where she became the main presenter of the 19/20, the daily news part of the early evening. She was also the presenter and chief editor of De qui se moque-t-on ?, a program about consumption and citizenship on the same channel, presenter and producer of Droit de suite, and presenter of Emploi du temps, a daily program about employment, on the national antenna. In 1996, she arrived at TF1 to present the daily talk show Évelyne. The next year, Évelyne Thomas enquired on sects and natural medicine on Envoyé spécial. In 1998, she presented and produced the program 7 en France on TPS. In 1999, she co-hosted several programs on France 3 like Mon auto et moi, a weekly program about automotive broadcast on Sunday afternoon with Alexandre Debanne and Denis Astagneau, and Pourquoi, comment, a program broadcast twice a month on prime time with Sylvain Augier.

=== Recognition period ===
Beginning 22 November 1999, Thomas presented the program C'est mon choix on France 3 from Monday to Friday at the beginning of the afternoon, a program that made her known from the wide audience and that was a great success. The program made rejuvenate the audience of the channel creating a real popular interest on the witness of anonymous people and its presenter. C'est mon choix is reinforced on the broadcast programming of France 3. The program is also broadcast during the week in the evening and on weekends for special evenings. But the program was criticized by the press, who judged the presenter hustling and sensationalist. The program even caused a debate at the National Assembly and then a cease and desist by the Conseil supérieur de l'audiovisuel. After five years, the bad relationship with producer Jean-Luc Delarue ended the broadcast on 18 June 2004, despite a very good audience. In addition to C'est mon choix, she presented in prime time on France 3 the programs Au nom des autres, Des vies d'exception and Symphonic Show.

In September 2004, Thomas co-hosted three episodes of Combien ça coûte?, with Jean-Pierre Pernaut, on TF1. The channel then gives her in 2005 the presentation of the program C'était mieux hier?, but this entertainment program mixing archived images and sequences on stage only had one episode broadcast on 2 February 2005.

In November 2005 and still on TF1, she produced a reality program titled Starting Over : départ pour une vie meilleure. This program was not successful and she consequently left the channel at the end of the year. Thomas then arrived on RTL9 where she began presenting, in November 2006 a talk show, Chacun sa place! This, too, was unsuccessful. At the end of 2006, Thomas joined the daily newspaper France-Soir, remaining until May 2007.

In 2009, Thomas presented a daily magazine broadcast live on Direct 8 in the late morning titled Y'a une solution à tout !. However, the program ended three months later. The audience was tripled passing from 30 000 to 90 000 auditors and reaching a high level of 130 000 auditors. Since January 2011, seven years after the end of C'est mon choix, Évelyne Thomas came back on France 3 where she was a columnist on the program Midi en France presented by Laurent Boyer. She went every week meeting people who live in different areas of France. In September 2011, France 3 asked her to come back daily and live on the stage with Laurent Boyer and the entire team. During the summers of 2011 and 2012, Thomas presented the morning radio program on Évelyne & News on RTL. In June 2013, she stopped Midi en France to present another similar program titled Dimanche en France.

== Other activities ==
In 2003, Thomas served as a model to the sculptor Daniel Druet for the bust of Marianne.

In 2004, she played herself in the Yann Moix film Podium.

== Bibliography ==
- Évelyne Thomas (2006). Éditions Ramsay (ed.). Entre vous et moi (in French). ISBN 978-2841147977.
- Cédric Potiron (2006). Éditions Pharos (ed.). Évelyne Thomas. La vraie vie de Marianne (in French). ISBN 978-2756900193.
