= Eight Mile Style v New Zealand National Party =

Legal case

- Court: High Court of New Zealand at Wellington
- Decided: 25 October 2017
- Citation: [2017] NZHC 2603.

Court membership
- Judge sitting: Helen Cull

Keywords
- Copyright Act 1994

Eight Mile Style v New Zealand National Party [2017] NZHC 2603 is a decision of the High Court of New Zealand which ruled that the New Zealand National Party's use of sound-alike music to the song "Lose Yourself" by American rapper Eminem in a campaign advertisement for the 2014 general election infringed on their copyright. The National Party was ordered to pay $600,000 in damages, which were reduced to $225,000 on appeal to the Court of Appeal.

== Lawsuit ==
On 16 September 2016, Eminem's publishers filed a lawsuit with the High Court in Wellington, claiming that the National Party, its advertising agency and others involved in creating and licensing the track had made a copyright infringement from using an instrumental version of the song "Lose Yourself" in television advertisements without their consent. Their campaign manager Steven Joyce stated their using of the song was "pretty legal", claiming it had been purchased from an Australian music library. The publishers counter-claimed that they never allowed the song to be used in a political advert. The trial began at the Wellington High Court on 1 May 2017. The case concluded on 12 May 2017; Justice Helen Cull reserved her decision. On 25 October, the High Court ruled that the National Party and its co-defendants had breached copyright and ordered them to pay $600,000 plus interest.

== Appeals ==
=== Court of Appeal ===
The National Party appealed the ruling on grounds that copyright was not breached and if it was, the damages should have been lower. There was a cross-appeal from US companies Eight Mile Style and Martin Affiliated sought to have the damages to be increased. The Court of Appeal of New Zealand upheld the National Party's appeal on damages only and reduced the amount of the damages to $225,000.

=== Supreme Court ===
Subsequently, Eight Mile Style sought leave to appeal the Court of Appeal decision in the Supreme Court in May 2019. The application for leave to appeal was dismissed and Eight Mile Style was ordered to pay $4500 in costs.

== Reactions ==
Eight Mile Style spokesman Joel Martin said the company was happy with the result following a "distasteful" trial for them, while National Party president Peter Goodfellow said the party was disappointed with the final verdict and would proceed themselves to pursue legal action against Labrador and Beatbox, who supplied them the music. Eminem told Variety that he was not consulted about the case, but should he receive any money from it he would donate it to charity for the Hurricane Harvey relief efforts. Musician and former APRA director Mike Chunn said that sound-alike recordings are routinely used in advertising and that the ruling was unfair.
