= List of number-one hits of 2003 (Austria) =

This is a list of the Austrian Singles Chart number-one hits of 2003.

Issue date	Song	Artist
5 January	"Der Steuersong (Las Kanzlern)"	Die Gerd-Show
12 January	"Lose Yourself"	Eminem
19 January	"Lose Yourself"	Eminem
26 January	"Lose Yourself"	Eminem
2 February	"All the Things She Said"	t.A.T.u.
9 February	"All the Things She Said"	t.A.T.u.
16 February	"All the Things She Said"	t.A.T.u.
23 February	"All the Things She Said"	t.A.T.u.
2 March	"All the Things She Said"	t.A.T.u.
9 March	"Tomorrow's Heroes"	Starmaniacs
16 March	"Tomorrow's Heroes"	Starmaniacs
23 March	"Tears of Happiness"	Michael Tschuggnall
30 March	"Tears of Happiness"	Michael Tschuggnall
6 April	"Ich lebe"	Christina Stürmer
13 April	"Ich lebe"	Christina Stürmer
20 April	"Ich lebe"	Christina Stürmer
27 April	"Ich lebe"	Christina Stürmer
4 May	"Ich lebe"	Christina Stürmer
11 May	"Ich lebe"	Christina Stürmer
18 May	"Ich lebe"	Christina Stürmer
25 May	"Ich lebe"	Christina Stürmer
1 June	"Ich lebe"	Christina Stürmer
8 June	"Für dich"	Yvonne Catterfeld
15 June	"Für dich"	Yvonne Catterfeld
22 June	"Anyplace, Anywhere, Anytime"	Nena and Kim Wilde
29 June	"Für dich"	Yvonne Catterfeld
6 July	"Ab in den Süden"	Buddy vs. DJ the Wave
13 July	"Ab in den Süden"	Buddy vs. DJ the Wave
20 July	"Ab in den Süden"	Buddy vs. DJ the Wave
27 July	"Ab in den Süden"	Buddy vs. DJ the Wave
3 August	"Ab in den Süden"	Buddy vs. DJ the Wave
10 August	"Ab in den Süden"	Buddy vs. DJ the Wave
17 August	"Ab in den Süden"	Buddy vs. DJ the Wave
24 August	"Ab in den Süden"	Buddy vs. DJ the Wave
31 August	"Ab in den Süden"	Buddy vs. DJ the Wave
7 September	"Ab in den Süden"	Buddy vs. DJ the Wave
14 September	"Ab in den Süden"	Buddy vs. DJ the Wave
21 September	"Ab in den Süden"	Buddy vs. DJ the Wave
28 September	"Maria (I Like It Loud)"	Scooter
5 October	"White Flag"	Dido
12 October	"White Flag"	Dido
19 October	"White Flag"	Dido
26 October	"Where Is the Love?"	The Black Eyed Peas
2 November	"Where Is the Love?"	The Black Eyed Peas
9 November	"Where Is the Love?"	The Black Eyed Peas
16 November	"Where Is the Love?"	The Black Eyed Peas
23 November	"Schick mir 'nen Engel"	Overground
30 November	"Mama (Ana Ahabak)"	Christina Stürmer
7 December	"Mama (Ana Ahabak)"	Christina Stürmer
14 December	"Mama (Ana Ahabak)"	Christina Stürmer
21 December	"Mama (Ana Ahabak)"	Christina Stürmer
28 December	"Mama (Ana Ahabak)"	Christina Stürmer

== See also ==
- 2003 in music
