= Elsa Fayer =

French radio and television presenter

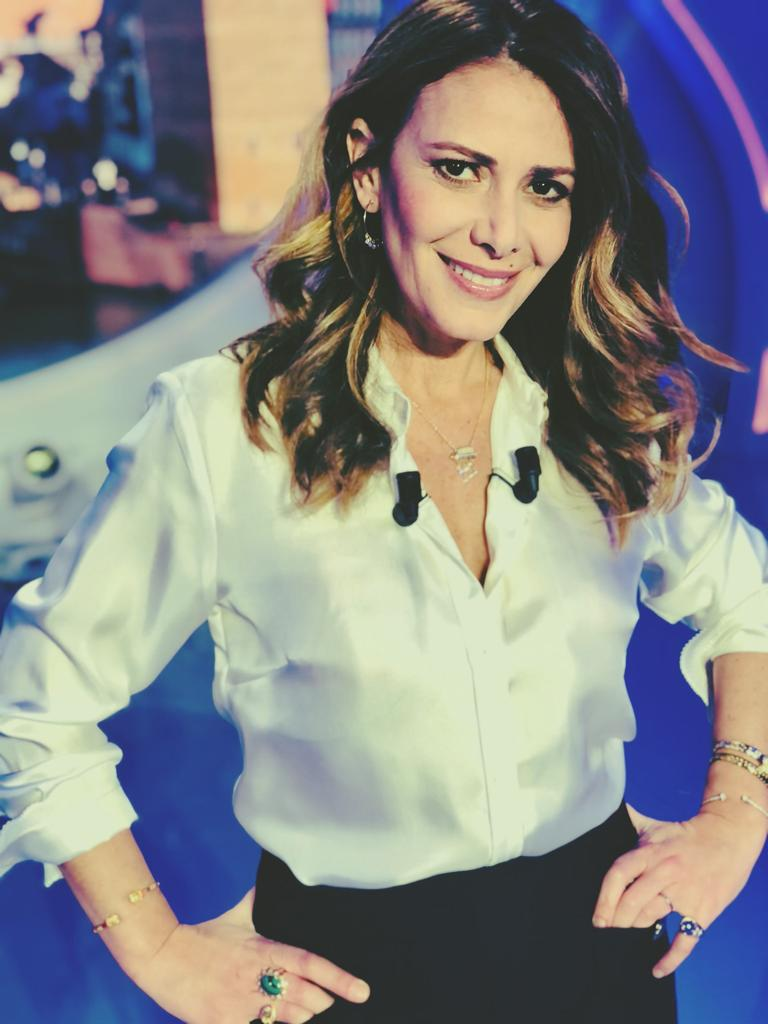
- Born: 9 November 1974 (age 51)
- Occupations: Television presenter, radio presenter
- Years active: 1998–present
- Notable credit(s): Qui veut épouser mon fils ? Mon incroyable fiancé 10 Couples Parfaits
- Television: M6 Group; France Télévisions; TF1 Group

Elsa Fayer (born 9 November 1974) is a French radio and television presenter.

== Early life and education ==
Elsa Fayer made her television debut in 1984 at the age of nine in the program Vitamine hosted by Karen Cheryl. She then appeared in an advertising campaign for Kookai in 1988, and in a Japanese television advertisement for the brand Superhighway in 1992. After studying law at the Panthéon-Assas University of Paris, she studied at the EFAP (École Française des Attachés de Presse) and graduated in 1997 with a master's degree in communication and media.

== Television career ==
She began her career as a journalist on Téva in the program Système Téva. She started presenting on the M6 Group in 1998 with programs for the new channel Fun TV. She then participated on TF1 in the program Y'a pas photo and later presented Toutes les télés du monde and Tubissimo on M6. She participated in 2003 at Nouvelle Star (titled À la Recherche de la Nouvelle Star during the first season) where she supported the contestants in the backstage during the prime time. In addition to national channels, she presented for two years Tous fans de série on Série Club, Jury de Stars and the poker tournament Poker Dome on NT1. She also presented the program of psychic reading L'avenir en direct on RTL9 with the astrologer Isabelle Viant.

She joined France Télévisions and became a columnist on the program On a tout essayé presented by Laurent Ruquier on France 2 from 2002 to 2007. She commented in direct from Istanbul the Eurovision Song Contest 2004 on France 3, as well as the Junior contest later that year on the same channel. During summer 2004, she presented the program Tout peut arriver on France 2. In February 2005, she presented in prime time with Laurent Ruquier on France 3 the two programs of the French selection for the Eurovision Song Contest 2005.

In September 2010, she returned on TF1 to present the reality program Qui veut épouser mon fils ? that reached for its first season 4.5 million viewers. In March 2011, she presented on TF1 the new reality program Carré ViiiP, but the broadcast was suspended the same month due to bad audience. She then presented on the same channel the second season of Qui veut épouser mon fils ? broadcast with success in 2012, and the third season in 2014. She presented in October 2014 the third season of the reality program Mon incroyable fiancé (French version of My Big Fat Obnoxious Fiance) in Miami on the second part of the evening.

In April 2016, she presented Le Grand Bêtisier on TMC, succeeding to Sandra Lou and Julie Taton. In December of that year, Vincent Cerutti then replaced her. In November 2016, she presents daily with Christophe Beaugrand the debriefing of the second season of La Villa des cœurs brisés on NT1. In July 2017, she presents on the same channel the reality program 10 Couples Parfais (French version of Are You the One?).

== Radio career ==
She has appeared since 1998 on Fun Radio in the daily program Fun Force, and on Europe 1 in the program On va s'gêner with Laurent Ruquier from 2002 to 2013.

== Participations ==
Elsa Fayer has regularly participated in numerous entertainment programs and game shows of different channels as a contestant such as Mot de Passe (French version of Million Dollar Password), Fort Boyard, Qui veut gagner des millions ?, Le Grand Concours des animateurs, Salut les Terriens, Fan des années 80 and Fan des années 90, for the association in which she is the spokesperson.

== Personal life ==
Elsa Fayer is married and has three daughters, Ambre (born in 1999) and twins Liv and Amy (born in September 2010). She married her husband, Zach Hanoun, the father of her twins, in 2016.
