= Lose Yourself =

2002 single by Eminem

Single by Eminem

from the album 8 Mile: Music from and Inspired by the Motion Picture
- Released: October 28, 2002
- Recorded: September 2001 – 2002
- Studio: 54 Sound Studio (Detroit, Michigan)
- Genre: Hip-hop; rap rock; hardcore hip-hop
- Length: 5:20 (album version); 5:26 (single version); 4:27 (radio edit)
- Label: Shady; Aftermath; Interscope
- Composers: Marshall Mathers; Jeff Bass; Luis Resto
- Lyricist: Marshall Mathers
- Producer: Eminem

Eminem singles chronology
"Cleanin' Out My Closet" (2002)	"Lose Yourself" (2002)	"8 Mile" (2002)

Music video
- "Lose Yourself" on YouTube

Audio sample
- file; help

"Lose Yourself" is a song by American rapper Eminem from the soundtrack to the 2002 film 8 Mile. The song was composed and produced by Eminem, longtime collaborator Jeff Bass (one half of the production duo Bass Brothers), and Luis Resto. The lyrics were written by Eminem. It was released on October 28, 2002, as the lead single from the soundtrack.

"Lose Yourself" was a commercial success, becoming Eminem's first Billboard Hot 100 number-one single and remaining there for twelve consecutive weeks. It also topped the charts in nineteen other countries. "Lose Yourself" received widespread acclaim from music critics, with many praising the song's themes and describing it as Eminem's best work to date. Eminem's rapping ability, the lyrics and the production were also praised. In many retrospective reviews and lists, critics have cited the song among Eminem's finest, as well as one of the greatest hip-hop songs of all time.

The music video for the song, directed by Eminem, manager Paul Rosenberg and Phillip G. Atwell, was released on October 7, 2002. The video includes scenes from and reminiscent of the movie 8 Mile, and Eminem rapping next to the "8 Mile Rd. Mobile Court" sign that appears on the cover of the movie's soundtrack. It received the MTV Video Music Award for Best Video from a Film.

"Lose Yourself" was the first hip-hop song to win the Academy Award for Best Original Song, and won the Grammy Award for Best Rap Song and Best Rap Solo Performance. In 2004, it was one of only three rap songs from the 21st century to be included on Rolling Stone's list of the 500 Greatest Songs of All Time, being the highest ranked at number 166. Rolling Stone also included it on its list of the Top 50 Hip Hop Songs of All Time. "Lose Yourself" is certified 13× Platinum by the Recording Industry Association of America (RIAA), and has been downloaded 10 million times in the United States alone. It is also the sixth most streamed song on Spotify from the 2000s. Eminem performed the song as a surprise at the 92nd Academy Awards on February 9, 2020, and alongside fellow American rapper Anderson .Paak (on drums) in the Super Bowl LVI halftime show on February 13, 2022.

== Background ==
According to Jeff Bass, work on the song began in September 2001 and "took about a year, back-and-forth, to complete." Eminem says that "Lose Yourself" was written on set, during breaks while filming 8 Mile. Taryn Manning, who played Jimmy's ex-girlfriend Janeane in 8 Mile, said in an interview with MTV that during the filming of the movie, in any downtime, Eminem was writing and that "you could just see him formulating stuff in his head". According to studio engineer Steven King, who spoke to Rolling Stone magazine, Eminem recorded the song in a portable studio on the set while he was on a break from shooting, using only one take for each verse. The sheet on which he wrote the song appears in 8 Mile in a scene where his character is writing while riding the bus.

The official demo version of this song, titled "Lose Yourself (Demo Version)" with two different verses and a slightly different hook, was released on the album Shady XV on November 24, 2014. A Drum & Bass remix has been made and was released on the mixtape Straight from the Lab as a European bonus track.

== Composition ==
"Lose Yourself" is a mid-tempo hip-hop track with an urgent narrative delivery. The song's lyrics explicitly sum up the background of Eminem's character in 8 Mile, B-Rabbit, with the first verse summing up much of the plot of the movie. The song incorporates several aggressive themes, largely dealing with the struggles dealt with by B-Rabbit, and how he eventually overcomes his many problems and obstacles to gain the respect of other rappers.

The song's production incorporates piano, drums, violins, and several other string instruments. The song is one of four new Eminem solo songs on the soundtrack, the other three being "8 Mile", "Rabbit Run", and "Stimulate" (included on deluxe edition only). Several critics cited this trio of songs as the best three from the soundtrack, as well as the most aggressive songs Eminem ever recorded. Piano chords described as "instantly recognizable" open the song. Throughout the song there is a "tense, unrelenting guitar lick". The song's sheet music is in the key of D minor in common time with a metronome of 66 before increasing to 86.

== Critical reception ==
"Lose Yourself" received universal critical acclaim, with many praising the song's aggressive themes and describing it as Eminem's best work to date. Eminem's rapping ability, the lyrics and the production were praised as well. In many retrospective reviews and lists, critics have cited the song among Eminem's finest, as well as one of the greatest hip-hop songs of all time. AllMusic editor Stephen Thomas Erlewine praised the song's production: "The opening track and first single [from the 8 Mile soundtrack] 'Lose Yourself' is easily equaled by the title song with its layered pianos" and he highlighted it.

NME was extremely positive: "Eminem's urgent radio hit 'Lose Yourself', you already know. It's excellent, if obviously an offcut from The Eminem Show, all thundering rawk guitars and Rocky-ish bassline (appropriately enough)." RapReviews also noted: "And as all great journeys begin with a single step, so too does Eminem with this album's opening song AND lead single entitled 'Lose Yourself'". 411 Mania praised the song: "The album wastes no time, delivering the hit 'Lose Yourself' as the first track. The song is as close to a ballad as Eminem will ever get. It is a very hot, adrenaline-laced track. It also continues Eminem's recent trend of putting out tracks with more of a meaning."

== Chart performance ==
In the United States, "Lose Yourself" debuted on the Billboard Hot 100 singles chart the week of October 5, 2002, at No. 43 prior to its release 24 days later, which is October 28 of that same year. A week later, the single jumped to No. 18, and hit No. 1 on the week of November 9 and remained there for twelve consecutive weeks until it was knocked off by "Bump, Bump, Bump" by B2K and P. Diddy. The single spent 16 total weeks in the Top 10, and a total of 23 weeks in the Top 50. While in the No. 1 spot (from November 9, 2002, through January 25, 2003), the song notably prevented Missy Elliott from reaching the top spot with the single "Work It", which was at No. 2 for 10 weeks, tied with "Waiting for a Girl Like You" by Foreigner for the most weeks at No. 2 without reaching No. 1. The song also topped the Pop Songs chart for 7 weeks and hit No. 4 and No. 2 on the Hot R&B/Hip-Hop Songs and Rap Songs charts. The song also used some rock music origins allowing moderate success to alternative rock radio peaking No. 14 on the Modern Rock Tracks chart. It reached 4 million in sales by August 2011, and as of September 2017, it has sold 7.37 million copies in the U.S.

In France, it is the 53rd-best-selling single of the 21st century, with 386,000 units sold as of August 2014. By December 2016, it had sold more than 11,590,000 units worldwide.

As of March 2018, it has sold 10 million copies in the U.S. and has been certified Diamond.

Following the performance of the song by Eminem and Anderson .Paak in the Super Bowl LVI halftime show on February 13, 2022, the song re-entered on the Billboard Hot 100 upon the issue date of February 26, 2022 for its further stay for a total of 24 weeks.

== Music video ==
The song's accompanying music video, directed by Eminem, manager Paul Rosenberg and Phillip G. Atwell, was released on October 7, 2002. The video includes several scenes from 8 Mile; plus scenes addressing problems Eminem had encountered, as well as "B-Rabbit"'s difficulties, including the ostracism by rap communities towards him due to his color and his difficult personal life.

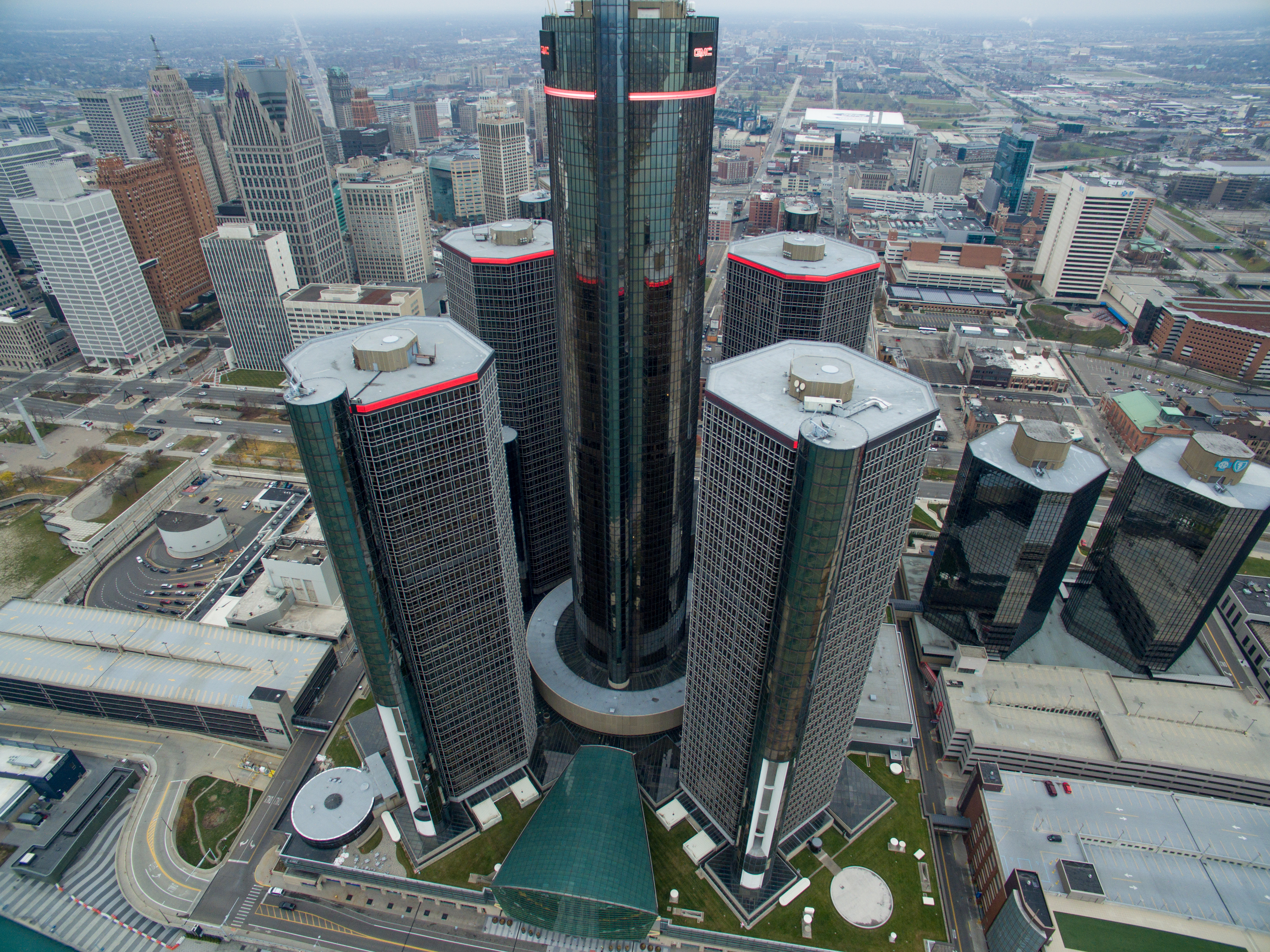
The Renaissance Center is among the Detroit buildings and locations featured in the video.

The music video for "Lose Yourself" was filmed in his hometown Detroit, Michigan, and thus contains numerous shots of the city, including the Ambassador Bridge. The video is a mixture of multiple scenarios, including scenes from and reminiscent of the movie 8 Mile, and Eminem rapping next to the "8 Mile Rd. Mobile Court" sign that appears on the cover of the movie's soundtrack.

It contains scenes focusing on both Rabbit's and the real-life Eminem's character; for example, the interpersonal difficulties he has to face while rapping, the insults and booing of crowds due to being a white rapper in a black-dominated scene, the domestic trouble he has to overcome due to his alcoholic mother and her deadbeat boyfriend, and dealing with the problems that arise from the people he associates with.

At the 2003 MTV Video Music Awards, it received the award for Best Video from a Film in the final year this award was given out. It also received nominations for Video of the Year, Best Male Video, Best Rap Video, and Viewer's Choice. He won a MuchMusic Video Award in 2003 for Favorite International Artist with the video for "Lose Yourself".

== Legacy ==
While not Eminem's best-selling single, "Lose Yourself" is considered by many to be his signature song. Upon its release, the track was a worldwide chart success, peaking at number one on 24 national charts worldwide. These included the US Billboard Hot 100, making it Eminem's first number-one hit in the United States. It had a 12-week run at No. 1 in the United States and Australia, and it topped the charts in many other countries, including United Kingdom, Ireland, New Zealand and Denmark. It debuted at number nine in Canada and moved up to #1 the following week. According to the Guinness Book of World Records, "Lose Yourself" became the "Longest-Running Single at Number One for a Rap Song", at 23 weeks. With over 19 million copies sold in the United States, it is Eminem's third-best-selling song, just behind "Love the Way You Lie" and "Not Afraid".

The song went on to receive the Academy Award for Best Original Song (the first time a rap song ever won this award), beating other nominees like U2's "The Hands That Built America". Eminem, who was not present at the award ceremony as he believed he would not win, said in a Shade 45 Behind the Boards interview with Cipha Sounds that he was actually sleeping, with cartoons on for his daughter, at the time the award was announced. This was the first time in 14 years the winner of the Best Original Song category did not perform at the ceremony. Luis Resto, one of the song's co-producers, had attended the ceremony and accepted the award on his behalf. "He's creative, he has symphonies in his head", Resto said at the lectern about Eminem. Mathers denied his absence was due to objections the show's producers had with the song's profanity. Eminem would later perform verses 1 and 3 of the uncensored song at a special performance during the 92nd Academy Awards in 2020, 17 years after he won the award, with brief moments of silence in the show's telecast. The American Film Institute later ranked it #93 on their list of the 100 Greatest Songs from American Films.

At the 46th Annual Grammy Awards, "Lose Yourself" became Eminem's second career nomination for Record of the Year (following "Without Me"), and it was the first rap song ever to be nominated for Song of the Year. It won Best Male Rap Solo Performance and Best Rap Song, which was a new category at the time.

At No. 166, "Lose Yourself" is the highest-ranked of the three songs from the 21st century featured in the 2004 List of Rolling Stone's 500 Greatest Songs of All Time (joining "Stan" at No. 290 and Outkast's "Hey Ya!" at No. 180), although it was dropped from the 2010 update but later reinstated to 167 in the 2021 version. The magazine later ranked the song the twelfth-best of the 2000s decade. The song was the 51st best-selling single of the 2000s decade in the United Kingdom. The song was placed at number 104 by Pitchfork on their list of "The Top 500 Tracks of the 2000s".

In October 2011, NME placed it at number 57 on its list "150 Best Tracks of the Past 15 Years". VH1 placed it at #4 for the best songs of the 2000s. In April 2016, it was placed at number 28 by Rolling Stone on their list of "100 Greatest Hip-Hop Songs of All Time".

The song continued to be prominent in 2020 and beyond. In an analysis of over 30,000 songs on Spotify, "Lose Yourself" was in the top 10 most popular songs on running playlists along with one of the most popular songs of the year in which the data was analyzed—"Blinding Lights" by the Weeknd—which also shares its tempo at 171 beats per minute. The song was also used by Joe Biden for his 2020 presidential campaign. Mathers, who endorsed Biden in his election campaign, gave his consent for Biden to use it for a campaign ad. Former US president Barack Obama covered the song at a 2024 rally in Detroit.

== Awards and nominations ==
Year	Organization	Award	Result
2003	Satellite Awards	Best Original Song	Nominated
2003	Critics' Choice Movie Awards	Best Song	Won
2003	Golden Globe Awards	Best Original Song	Nominated
2003	Academy Awards	Best Original Song	Won
2003	MTV Video Music Awards Japan	Best Video from a Film	Won
2003	BET Awards	Video of the Year	Nominated
2003	MTV Video Music Awards	Video of the Year	Nominated
2003	MTV Video Music Awards	Best Male Video	Nominated
2003	MTV Video Music Awards	Best Rap Video	Nominated
2003	MTV Video Music Awards	Best Video from a Film	Won
2003	MTV Video Music Awards	Viewer's Choice Award	Nominated
2003	World Soundtrack Awards	Best Original Song Written Directly for a Film	Nominated
2004	Grammy Awards	Record of the Year	Nominated
2004	Grammy Awards	Song of the Year	Nominated
2004	Grammy Awards	Best Male Rap Solo Performance	Won
2004	Grammy Awards	Best Rap Song	Won
2004	Grammy Awards	Best Song Written for Visual Media	Nominated

== In popular culture ==
- In January 2003, ABC Radio Grandstand commentator Kerry O'Keeffe recited the chorus of the song on-air as cricketer Steve Waugh headed towards his famous last-ball century at the Sydney Cricket Ground Test match.
- In February 2003, American comedian Dave Chappelle made a skit on Chappelle's Show parodying 8 Mile and "Lose Yourself" whereby he is on stage telling cliched jokes and constantly repeating the words "spaghetti" and "jokes" before screaming "8 Mile!".
- In the 2003 Rugby World Cup Final, the England national rugby union team listened to the track in the changing rooms as inspiration to their first rugby world cup win, and the song was also used by the English Rugby Union during the tournament to advertise the sport and the tournament itself.
- In 2003, a part of the tune of the song is used as the theme music on the German detective series Lenßen & Partner.
- In 2005–2006, Queen + Paul Rodgers (a collaboration between the band and the singer) used the song as the house music for all of the concerts on their Queen + Paul Rodgers Tour. When the song cut out, the concert would begin with Paul Rodgers singing the opening lines of Reaching Out by Rock Therapy (featuring Rogers and Queen guitarist Brian May), before launching into the first full song. A live recording of this was later used by Eminem as a sample for his 2009 track "Beautiful".
- On May 15, 2006, Jodie Foster quoted the chorus of the song in her commencement speech at the University of Pennsylvania.
- In 2007, the teen drama series Instant Star named its season premiere episode after this song.
- In 2009, the character Jeffrey Barnes in the TV show Chuck, quoted the opening lines of the song on YouTube in the episode, "Chuck Versus the Best Friend".
- In 2009, "Lose Yourself" was often used as the pre-game song at University of Southern California home games.
- In 2009, George Sotiropoulos used this as his entrance song at UFC 101.
- In 2011, an instrumental version of the song is featured on the Super Bowl XLV commercial entitled Born of Fire, featuring a Chrysler 200.
- In 2012, an instrumental version of the song is sometimes played before kick off or during half time at Nottingham Forest F.C. and Millwall F.C.
- The 2015 episode "Nashville" of Master of None begins with a discussion between characters Dev and Arnold about whether the song is written from the perspective of B-Rabbit or Eminem.
- In the 2019 film 6 Underground, Ryan Reynolds' character One mentioned several lines from the song's opening verse.
- In September 2021, Eminem and Union Joints opened Mom's Spaghetti – a restaurant in Detroit, which is a reference to the song.
- In October 2024, Barack Obama quoted several lines from the song's opening verse, without music, after being introduced by Eminem at a rally for the Kamala Harris 2024 presidential campaign in Detroit.
- The instrumental version was played as part of the pre-match protocol for the 2026 FIFA World Cup, while players waited in the entrance tunnel.

== Covers and alternate versions ==
- "Weird Al" Yankovic made a parody of the song, titled "Couch Potato", on his 2003 album Poodle Hat. Though Yankovic was denied permission to film a music video, Eminem did allow him to record a parody of the song.
- Kelly Clarkson covered this song during her Clarkston, MI show on August 10, 2012, as part of her fan request cover song.
- Canadian jazz singer Kellylee Evans recorded the song on her 2013 album I Remember When and regularly performs it live.
- American rapper Machine Gun Kelly, who named Eminem as a major influence, covered the song routinely on his first tour, even performing the song along with parts of the movie at The Shelter at Saint Andrew's Hall.
- A mashup of this song with German artist Nena's "Nur geträumt", created by HiFi Brown, was a German radio hit in 2003.
- In February 2017, Vincent Vinel sang a cover of the song during season 6 of The Voice: la plus belle voix. The audition was released on YouTube and has garnered over 186 million views, becoming The Voice – La plus belle voix's most viewed video.
- Saliva released a cover of the song online on September 22, 2017.
- American country singer Taylor Swift covered the song a number of times while on tour. She covered the song acoustically numerous times on the radio as well including radio station KEEY-FM.
- The East Village Opera Company performed this song live in the past, usually as an encore with full orchestra backing.
- Australian singer-songwriter Kasey Chambers performed the song with her band at the Civic Theatre in Newcastle, Australia on June 15, 2022. A video of the performance was created from a compilation of live audience video contributions.

== Track listing ==
US / UK / European CD single
No.	Title	Writer(s)	Producer(s)	Length
1.	"Lose Yourself"	Marshall Mathers; Jeffrey Bass; Luis Resto	Eminem; Jeff Bass^{[a]}	5:26
2.	"Renegade" (Jay-Z featuring Eminem)	Shawn Carter; Mathers; Resto	Eminem	5:38
3.	"Lose Yourself" (instrumental)	Mathers; Bass; Resto	Eminem; Bass^{[a]}	5:27
4.	"Lose Yourself" (video)	Mathers; Bass; Resto	Eminem; Bass^{[a]}	5:26
5.	"8 Mile Trailer"
Total length:				21:57

Notes

- ^{^[a]} signifies an additional producer.

== Credits and personnel ==
Credits for "Lose Yourself" are adapted from the liner notes of the original soundtrack to the movie 8 Mile.

Recording

- Recorded at: Detroit, Michigan

Personnel

- Eminem – vocals, audio mixing, producer, songwriting, and drum programming
- Jeff Bass – additional production, songwriter, electric guitar, bass, piano, and keyboards
- Steve King – audio mixing and recording
- Mike Strange – recording
- Luis Resto – additional production, songwriter, keyboards, and programming

== Charts ==
=== Weekly charts ===
2002–2003 weekly chart performance for "Lose Yourself"
Chart (2002–2003)	Peak position
Australia (ARIA)	1
Australian Urban (ARIA)	1
Austria (Ö3 Austria Top 40)	1
Belgium (Ultratop 50 Flanders)	1
Belgium (Ultratop 50 Wallonia)	1
Canada (Nielsen SoundScan)	1
Chile (Notimex)	4
Croatia (HRT)	1
Czech Republic (IFPI)	11
Denmark (Tracklisten)	1
El Salvador (Notimex)	1
Eurochart Hot 100 (Billboard)	1
Finland (Suomen virallinen lista)	1
France (SNEP)	3
Germany (GfK)	2
Greece (IFPI)	1
Guatemala (Notimex)	4
Hungary (Single Top 40)	1
Ireland (IRMA)	1
Italy (FIMI)	1
Latvia (Latvian Airplay Top 50)	6
Netherlands (Dutch Top 40)	1
Netherlands (Single Top 100)	1
New Zealand (Recorded Music NZ)	1
Norway (VG-lista)	1
Portugal (AFP)	1
Romania (Romanian Top 100)	6
Scottish Singles Sales (Official Charts)	2
Spain (Promusicae)	9
Sweden (Sverigetopplistan)	1
Switzerland (Schweizer Hitparade)	1
UK Singles (Official Charts)	1
UK Hip Hop/R&B (Official Charts)	1
US Billboard Hot 100	1
US Alternative Airplay (Billboard)	14
US Hot R&B/Hip-Hop Songs (Billboard)	4
US Hot Rap Songs (Billboard)	2
US Pop Airplay (Billboard)	1
US Rhythmic Airplay (Billboard)	1

2022–2025 weekly chart performance for "Lose Yourself"
Chart (2022–2025)	Peak position
Canada Hot 100 (Billboard)	18
Global 200 (Billboard)	25
Russia Streaming (TopHit)	99
Slovakia (Singles Digitál Top 100)	43
US Billboard Hot 100	40

=== Year-end charts ===
Year-end chart performance for "Lose Yourself"
Chart (2002)	Position
Canada (Nielsen SoundScan)	62
UK Singles (OCC)	32
US Billboard Hot 100	63

Chart (2003)	Position
Australia (ARIA)	2
Austria (Ö3 Austria Top 40)	6
Belgium (Ultratop Flanders)	16
Belgium (Ultratop Wallonia)	7
Brazil (Crowley)	36
Europe (European Hot 100 Singles)	1
France (SNEP)	12
Germany (Official German Charts)	6
Ireland (IRMA)	6
Italy (FIMI)	7
Netherlands (Dutch Top 40)	12
Netherlands (Single Top 100)	11
New Zealand (Recorded Music NZ)	30
Romania (Romanian Top 100)	33
Sweden (Sverigetopplistan)	1
Switzerland (Schweizer Hitparade)	12
UK Singles (OCC)	25
US Billboard Hot 100	28
US Hot R&B/Hip-Hop Songs (Billboard)	71

Chart (2017)	Position
France (SNEP)	199

Chart (2022)	Position
Global 200 (Billboard)	120

Chart (2023)	Position
Switzerland (Schweizer Hitparade)	48

Chart (2024)	Position
France (SNEP)	188

=== Decade-end charts ===
Decade-end chart performance for "Lose Yourself"
Chart (2000–2009)	Position
Australia (ARIA)	7
Germany (Official German Charts)	44
Netherlands (Single Top 100)	52
UK Singles (Official Charts Company)	49
US Billboard Hot 100	28
Chart (2010–2019)	Position
Australia (ARIA)	88

=== All-time charts ===
All-time chart performance for "Lose Yourself"
Chart	Position
US Billboard Pop Songs (1992–2017)	100
US Billboard Hot 100 (1958–2018)	169

== Certifications ==
Region	Certification	Certified units/sales
Australia (ARIA)	20× Platinum	1,400,000^{‡}
Austria (IFPI Austria)	4× Platinum	120,000^{*}
Belgium (BRMA)	Platinum	50,000^{*}
Brazil (Pro-Música Brasil)	Platinum	60,000^{‡}
Canada (Music Canada)	6× Platinum	480,000^{*}
Denmark (IFPI Danmark)	4× Platinum	360,000^{‡}
Finland (Musiikkituottajat)	Gold	6,304
France (SNEP)	Gold	386,000
Germany (BVMI)	3× Platinum	1,800,000^{‡}
Greece (IFPI Greece)	Gold	10,000^{^}
Italy (FIMI)	3× Platinum	150,000^{‡}
Japan (RIAJ) Ringtone	3× Platinum	750,000^{*}
Japan (RIAJ) Full-length ringtone	Gold	100,000^{*}
Japan (RIAJ) PC download	Gold	100,000^{*}
New Zealand (RMNZ)	9× Platinum	270,000^{‡}
Norway (IFPI Norway)	Platinum	10,000^{*}
Portugal (AFP)	3× Platinum	120,000^{‡}
Spain (Promusicae)	2× Platinum	120,000^{‡}
Sweden (GLF)	Platinum	30,000^{^}
Switzerland (IFPI Switzerland)	Platinum	40,000^{^}
United Kingdom (BPI)	6× Platinum	3,600,000^{‡}
United States (RIAA)	13× Platinum	13,000,000^{‡}
Streaming
Japan (RIAJ)	Gold	50,000,000^{†}
^{*} Sales figures based on certification alone.^{^} Shipments figures based on certification alone.^{‡} Sales+streaming figures based on certification alone.^{†} Streaming-only figures based on certification alone.

== See also ==
- Academy Award for Best Original Song
- Eight Mile Style v New Zealand National Party
- Grammy Award for Best Rap Song
- Grammy Award for Best Rap Solo Performance
- List of best-selling singles
- List of best-selling singles in the United States
- List of best-selling singles in Australia
- List of number-one singles in Australia in 2002
- List of number-one singles of 2002 (Ireland)
- List of number-one hits of 2002 (Italy)
- List of number-one singles from the 2000s (UK)
- List of Hot 100 number-one singles of 2002 (U.S.)
- List of number-one hits of 2003 (Austria)
- List of number-one hits in Denmark
- List of Dutch Top 40 number-one singles of 2003
- List of European number-one hits of 2003
- List of number-one singles from the 2000s (New Zealand)
- List of number-one hits in Norway
- List of number-one hits of 2003 (Sweden)
- List of number-one hits of 2003 (Switzerland)
- List of number-one hits of 2002 (Romania)
- Ultratop 50 number-one hits of 2003
- Ultratop 40 number-one hits of 2003
