= Childeric =

Childeric (also Childerich or Childéric) was the name of several Frankish kings:

- Childeric I (c.440–481)
- Childeric II (c.653–673)
- Childeric III (c.717–754)

== See also ==
- Hilderic (disambiguation)
- Childeric Muller, French TV personality and politician
