= Jean-Luc Delarue =

Television presenter and producer

- Born: Jean-Luc Delarue; 24 June 1964; Paris, France
- Died: 23 August 2012 (aged 48); Paris, France
- Occupations: TV host, TV producer and C.E.O of Résérvoir Prod

Jean-Luc Delarue (24 June 1964 – 23 August 2012) was a French television presenter and producer specialising in televised discussion programmes.

== Early life and education ==
Delarue was born in Paris on the 24 June 1964. His mother, an English teacher, is of Hungarian origin. His father, Jean-Claude Delarue, is of Russian origin, is a professor of American Studies, and is responsible for founding various organisations such as the Association de Défense des usagers de l'administration, the Conseil national d'action contre le bruit, SOS-Environnement, the Alliance écologique, the Ligue contre la violence routière, the Fédération des usagers des transports et des services publics, SOS petits porteurs (2002), and SOS tutelles (2006).

A former pupil of the La Fontaine school at Antony, Delarue passed a baccalauréat B then studied for a Diplôme universitaire de technologie (DUT) (a type of French university diploma, below degree level) in media, choosing an advertising option. In 1986 he joined the DDB agency as an advertising-copywriter, and made his first foray into the world of television that same year in a programme hosted by Childéric Muller (a French television and radio presenter/producer) on the now defunct French channel TV6 (a predecessor of the contemporary M6 channel).

== Radio career ==
Delarue made his start in radio on a programme about advertising on Radio Ark en Ciel in Paris.

In 1987 he joined Europe 1, where he remained until 1995. From summer 1988 he presented the French Top 50 singles show with the French actor, script-writer, director and presenter Olivier Dorangeon. They continued presenting the show from September 1988, weekdays from 19:30 to 21:00. In September 1989, Delarue, working with the French television radio host and actor Yvan Le Bolloc'h, overhauled the show, renaming it Top 50 système D. It broadcast on Europe 1 during 1989–1990, between 19:30 and 21:00. Its slogan was Du Top 50, du jeu crétin, du Top Albums, des reportages de Super Bolloc'h, du cinéma, des cadeaux par milliers et des invités Top niveau (The Top 50, crazy games, Top Albums, reports by Super Bolloc'h, films, gifts by the thousand, and top-notch guests).

Delarue presented a television news programme called Mon œil (My eye) every afternoon during 1991–1992, then between 8:40 and 9:00 in the morning in 1994. Additionally, and again at Europe 1, he presented a programme called L'Équipe du matin (The Morning Team) for the station's 7:00–9:00 news slot, attracting 300,000 listeners.

== Television career ==
Delarue began his television career in 1986 on a programme titled Système6 hosted by Childéric Muller on the TV6 channel. He was then given his own programme, Une page de pub, on the same channel, co-presenting it with Olivier Dorangeon until February 1987.

He joined Canal+ after taking part in various well-received special editions of the Enfants du rock programme on France 2, between 1987 and 1989.

=== 1990s ===
In 1990 Delarue worked as a reporter on Michel Denisot's show "Demain" (Tomorrow), as well as hosting the TV game show Scruples with Isabelle Giordano (a French journalist and television/radio presenter) during the summer at 19:15 each evening. He also began hosting and producing a show called "La Grande Famille" (The Big Family) in 1990, staying with it for three years. The show was broadcast daily at midday.

In 1994 he left Canal+ to return to France 2, at the same time establishing his own production company, Réservoir Prod, which produced his flagship series Ça se discute (Something to discuss) – a talk programme dealing with a different societal topic in each episode. The series ended on the 24 June 2009 after 15 successful years. Delarue wore a very visible earpiece during the programmes and came to be known as "L'homme à l'oreillette" (The man with the earpiece). He offered the following explanation for the prominent earpiece: "J'ai pris une oreillette visible parce que ça signifiait qu'une émission, c'est un travail d'équipe qui ne repose pas seulement sur les épaules d'un animateur." (I chose a visible earpiece because that demonstrated that a programme depends on teamwork and not just on the presenter).

In 1995 he produced and presented two new weekly programmes, again for France 2: Déjà dimanche (Sunday already) and Déjà le retour (Already back again). Both were successes, and this led two years later to an opportunity to fill the daily 19:00–20:00 slot on France 2, with a programmed called C'est l'heure (It's time). The programme did not turn out to be a success however.

In 1998 he produced and presented his second programme to deal with societal issues, Jour après jour (Day after day), again for France 2 but in prime-time this time. The programme won a 7 d'or in 2001. There were two televisual firsts for Delarue in 1999: his first production for TF1, the short programme Bien jardiner (Good gardening) with Jean-Pierre Coffe (a French radio and television presenter, food critic, writer, chef and actor), and the creation for France 3 of the first programme to be dedicated to new media and the internet, 3x+Net, presented by Florian Gazan (a French radio presenter) and Orianne Garcia (a well-known French internet specialist of Spanish origin).

In 1999 Réservoir Prod launched "C'est mon choix" (It's my choice), a daily talk show hosted by Évelyne Thomas on France 3. Despite its success the show came to an end during summer 2004 due to an unresolved dispute between the producers and Thomas.

On the 31 December 1999, for the turn of the millennium, Delarue presented non-stop for 24 hours on France 2.

=== 2000s ===
In 2000 Delarue, after appointing Childeric Muller as co-president, he founded three subsidiaries for Réservoir Prod: Réservoir Net, dedicated to the creation of audiovisual and interactive internet content (winning a Wanadoo Talent Show prize for its CINEMAN interactive programme); Réservoir Sport, specialising in sports programmes; and Réservoir Doc, producing report segments for Zone interdite on M6, Des racines et des ailes on France 3, and Envoyé spécial (a weekly magazine show) on France 2.

In terms of whole programmes, Réservoir Prod produced Tous égaux on France 3, a magazine programme showcasing the various talents of ordinary French people, presented by Florian Gazan and Vladys Muller (a French actress and television presenter), as well as Toast on Paris Première, a bi-monthly lifestyle programme in which Delarue focussed on news, trends and history from the arts and design worlds.

In October 2000 Delarue saw his show Ça se discute awarded a 7 d'or. On the back of this success he opened a restaurant, Le Korova, and continued to produce further programmes. He received a second 7 d'or in October 2001 for Jour après jour and opened a second restaurant, Le Nobu – specialising in Japanese cuisine – in partnership with Robert De Niro.

In 2001, in partnership with Franck Saurat, Delarue founded Carson Prod, a production company specialising in entertainment programmes such as Stars à domicile (Stars in the home), which was presented by Flavie Flament and featured a filmed, surprise meeting between a celebrity and a fan, taking place in the fan's home or other location familiar to them. Carson Prod also produced Y'a un début à tout and La Chanson n°1 on France 2, both presented by Daniela Lumbroso (a Tunisian born presenter and television/radio producer). Additionally, in 2001, Réservoir Prod created two new television programmes: Vis ma vie on TF1, presented by Laurence Ferrari, and David contre Goliath on France 2, with David Douillet. Delarue also provided PR for the boxer Brahim Asloum in 2001, who would go on to become world champion.

By 2003 the Réservoir Group (Réservoir Prod and Carson Prod) employed more than 250 permanent staff and was the premier independent producer of throwaway programming in France (excluding sport and news), with 14 hours of production per week in 2002.

In 2003 Delarue produced the talk show Scrupules with Carol Rousseau on TF1, and for Canal+ La Vie en clair (from September 2003 to June 2004).

In 2004 he had to bring several programmes to an end, including C'est mon choix and, due to a lack of viewers, Stars à domicile, Scrupules, and La vie en clair.

=== 2006 to 2011 ===
After the end of the 2006 summer season Delarue launched a new early afternoon programme called Toute une histoire (A whole story). He also launched the television presenting career of Stéphane Plaza with Recherche appartement ou maison (Flat or house wanted) in February 2006, then Maison à vendre (House for sale) in December 2007.

In 2007 and 2008 Group Réservoir produced new programmes examining serious illnesses from a fresh perspective: Le Cancer sort de l'ombre (Cancer in the light of day) and Alzheimer, un nouveau regard (Alzheimers re-examined) (13 February 2008).

With a monthly income of €40,000 in 2008 and assets and capital amounting to 30 million euros, Delarue was one of the highest paid presenter-producers in France.

In September 2010 media reports of his problems with cocaine forced him to put his television career on hold, and Sophie Davant (a French journalist, television presenter and actress) took over presenting Toute une histoire, which Delarue had presented daily.

On the 6 September 2011 he returned to the studios of France 2 with a new programme: Réunion de famille (Family reunion). The programme enjoyed fairly limited success and ended a few months after its first broadcast.

== Personal life ==
On the 21 October 2006 Delarue's then partner, Élisabeth Bost (a French journalist and television presenter), gave birth to their son, Jean Delarue-Bost. The couple separated in January 2009. In November 2009 Delarue appeared on the cover of the French women's magazine Gala with his new companion Inés Sastre, though in March 2010 he announced their break-up.

In February 2011 he was interviewed for a magazine in the company of his new companion, Anissa Khel. They were married on the 12 May 2012 at Belle-Île-en-Mer in Brittany.

== Illness and death ==
Delarue died at the age of 48 on the 23 August 2012 from cancer of the stomach and peritoneum, having been hospitalised due to his deteriorating health. He had revealed he was suffering from cancer during a press conference held at the headquarters of France Télévisions on the 2 December 2011, pre-empting a member of the paparazzi who had gained possession of his medical records.

A frail looking Delarue made a final public appearance at a Fashion Week in January 2012, with his partner by his side.

On the 22 July 2012, a month before his death, Delarue was the victim of a hoax: a false rumour that he had died circulated, having been started on the social network site Twitter.

On the 28 August 2012, France 2 broadcast a special live programme paying homage to Delarue. Titled Toute son histoire (His whole story), it was presented by Sophie Davant and took a look back over Delarue's career as a presenter-producer, using large amounts of archive material. A large number of television personalities were in attendance, along with some of Delarue's former guests. The programme was broadcast late evening from 22:20 and attracted 2,249,000 viewers – 18.9% of the market share – and was the highest viewed programme from 23:15 onwards that evening.

After Delarue's death his father told the press he had not been invited to his son's funeral, and that his son had converted to Islam shortly before his death and was buried in the Muslim section of a cemetery in a banlieue. Delarue's widow, Anissa Khel, denied some of this, stating that he did not convert to Islam and that he was buried at Père Lachaise Cemetery.

On 24 September 2012 AFP announced that Delarue had been interred in Cimetière de Thiais, near Paris and that his grave was located in a part of the cemetery where the crypts of Muslim families are to be found.

== Incidents and legal problems ==
In April 2006, Delarue, as president of Réservoir Prod, was handed a suspended fine of 2,000 euros for not affording temporary staff the same rights as permanent staff.

On the 13 February 2007, on an Air France flight from Paris to Johannesburg, and under the influence of alcohol and medication, Delarue had to be handcuffed by the flight crew after he allegedly "insulted, bit, and slapped a steward, and even touched an air hostess's breasts." Three days after the incident, on the 16 February, three members of the flight crew made formal complaints about Delarue's aggressive and insulting behaviour to the authorities at Roissy Airport. As a consequence, the courts sentenced Delarue, on the 28 March 2007, to attendance at a three-day citizenship course at his own expense.

In 2009, when presenting the televised French award ceremony Globes de cristal (The Crystal Globes) with Carole Gaessler, Delarue drew attention to himself with his over-excited behaviour and inappropriate comments. As he was presenting the prize for best television documentary to the French director and politician Yamina Benguigui he said: "I could hold your globe for you if you like...or your globes", alluding to Benguigui's plunging neckline. She later told the press that the incident had ruined her evening, demanding both an explanation and a public apology from Delarue. Shortly afterwards Delarue announced on RTL that Benguigui had since, in part, accepted his apology.

On the 14 September 2010 Delarue was held for questioning in the context of an extensive investigation carried out by the Hauts-de-Seine police into major drug trafficking. Delarue came to the attention of the investigators after their enquiries revealed he was a significant consumer of cocaine, purchasing large quantities of the drug. The same evening he offered an explanation for the events in a message recorded at the studios of France 2, a few hours after his release, during which he stated that he was receiving treatment for his drug use and apologised for setting a bad example. The following week France Télévisions took the decision to suspend Delarue for a provisional, indeterminate period so that he could receive treatment and rest and recuperate. Sophie Davant took over the role of presenting Toute une histoire in the interim. Delarue went on to create a foundation, as part of the Réservoir group, to combat all types of addiction/dependence. Delarue's court case, which was due to take place in July 2012, was postponed until February 2013 because of his health problems, at the request of his lawyer. The case did not go to court due to Delarue's death on the 23 August 2012.

== Programmes presented ==
=== Television ===
- Une page de pub (1986 on TV6)
- Les Enfants du rock (1987–1989 on Antenne 2)
- Demain (1990 on Canal+)
- Scrupules (1990 on Canal+)
- La Grande Famille (1991–1994 on Canal+)
- Ça se discute (1994–2009 on France 2)
- Déjà dimanche (1985–1987 on France 2)
- Déjà le retour (1995–1997 on France 2)
- C'est l'heure (1997 on France 2)
- Jour après jour (1998–2001 on France 2)
- La Fête de la musique (on France 2, co-presented with Michel Drucker and Daniela Lumbroso)
- Les Vainqueurs de l'Année (2001–2003 France 2, co-presented with Michel Drucker)
- Toute une histoire (2006–2010 on France 2)
- Réunion de famille (2011 on France 2)

=== Radio ===
- Top 50 (1987–1990 on Europe 1)
- Les Goûters (1990–1991)
- L'Équipe du matin (1991–1992 on Europe 1)
- Mon œil (1991–1992, 1994 on Europe 1)
