= Gaël Leforestier =

French television host

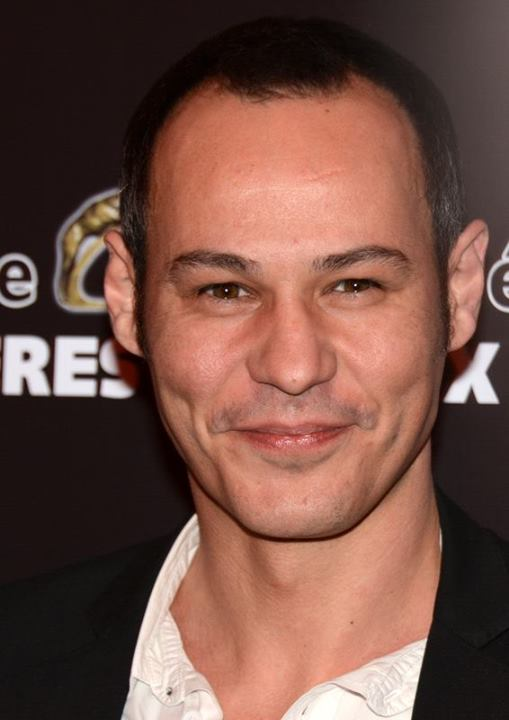
Leforestier in 2014.

Gaël Leforestier (born 28 May 1975) is a French television host.

== TV career ==
Gaël Leforestier began his career at the age of 15, portraying Pierre de Marivaux in Le Triomphe de l'amour, in Paris. In 1992 he wrote and directed a short film with Stévenin Robinson entitled Stop.

In 1994, he participated in various castings. He was spotted by Michel Drucker and got a job as columnist in the show Studio Gabriel on France 2.

From 1998 to 2000, he hosted the program En juin, ça sera bien on La Cinquième. Thereafter, he became the host of Sex in the TV on Channel Téva, then Plus vite que la musique on M6 (2000-2001). Laurent Ruquier invited him to join his team on his radio program On va pas s'gêner between 1999 and 2000. In the 2001 summer, he hosted the show Unique en son genre on TF1 Sundays in the second part of the evening.

Back on France 2, he co-hosted a prime-time show Code de la route : le grand Examen with Michel Drucker, as well as Comme on s'aime. After that he hosted On est comme on est on Sunday evenings. Finally, for one month in September 2003 he directed the show Qu'est-ce qui se passe quand ?.

During the 2004-2005 season, he arrived on TMC to host En quête de nuit. On New Year's Eve 2008, he hosted Imagina from the Grimaldi Forum in Monaco. In 2009, he hosted the show Kamikaze on TF6, every Sunday evening.

== Personal life ==
He was married to Claire Dabrowski, director of the magazine programs on France 2, with whom he had a son in 2002.
