= Ramsay (publishing house) =

- Parent company: Gaumont (1982–1986); Éditions Régine Deforges (1986–1992); Vilo (1992–present)
- Founded: 1976; 50 years ago
- Country of origin: France
- Headquarters location: Paris
- Publication types: Books
- Fiction genres: Littérature, essays
- Official website: ramsay.fr

Ramsay is a French publishing house belonging to the Vilo group.

== History ==
Les Editions Ramsay were founded in 1976 in the form of a Société à responsabilité limitée by Jean-Pierre Ramsay, who sold them in 1982 to Gaumont. They stood out at the end of 1982 with the publication of La Bicyclette bleue (the Blue Bicycle), which soon became a bestseller. After a long empty passage and the threat posed to the publishing house by the lawsuit filed for infringement against Regine Deforges by the rightholders of Gone with the Wind, it was ceded to Éditions Régine Deforges.

Following the filing of bankruptcy and the judicial liquidation of Éditions Régine Deforges in 1992, Editions Ramsay were bought out by Michel Lafon and then in 1998 by the Vilo group.

In 2014, Ramsay publishes a book on President Edgar Faure entitled Edgar Faure, secrets d’État, secrets de famille, written by his grandson, Rodolphe Oppenheimer-Faure and Luc Corlouër, prefaced by Jean-Michel Baylet and Jean-Louis Borloo.
