= À la Recherche de la Nouvelle Star =

- Country of origin: France
- No. of seasons: 1

Original release
- Network: M6
- Release: 27 March – 10 July 2003

À la recherche de la nouvelle star (Looking for the new Star) is a reality television show based on the popular British show Pop Idol. The show is a contest to determine the best young singer in La Francophonie. It was hosted by Benjamin Castaldi. The Belgian singer Jonatan Cerrada won over Thierry Amiel with 50.4% of the total votes, and went on to represent France at the 2004 Eurovision Song Contest, with "À chaque pas".

After the first season the show was renamed Nouvelle Star.

== Auditions ==
The inaugural season of À la Recherche de la Nouvelle Star had seven audition cities to find the best talent not only in France, but also Belgium and Canada:

Toulouse (8 February)
Lyon (14 February)
Marseille (18 February)
Rennes (22 February)
Paris (28 February)
Brussels, Belgium (7 March)
Montreal, Canada (14 March)

== Finals ==
=== Finalists ===
(ages stated at time of contest)

| Contestant | Age | Hometown | Voted Off | Liveshow Theme |
|---|---|---|---|---|
| Jonatan Cerrada | 17 | Liège, Belgium | Winner | Grand Finale |
| Thierry Amiel | 20 | Marseille | 10 July 2003 | Grand Finale |
| Jean Sébastien Lavoie | 24 | Montreal, Canada | 3 July 2003 | Hommage |
| Alexis Juliard | 21 | Paris | 26 June 2003 | Le voyage |
| Laetizia Alberti | 20 | Corsica | 19 June 2003 | Années 2000 |
| Yoann Kelyann | 19 | Mont-de-Marsan | 12 June 2003 | Funky hits |
| Jonathan Hassen-Ali | 20 | Givors | 5 June 2003 | Pop Hits |
| Cindie Bruzzi | 16 | | 29 May 2003 | Film Hits |
| Priscilla | 16 | | 22 May 2003 | My Birth Year |
| Gabrielle Ducomble | 22 | Liège, Belgium | 15 May 2003 | Contestant's Choice |

=== Live Show Details ===
==== Heat 1 (24 April 2003) ====
| Artist | Song (original artists) | Result |
|---|---|---|
| Alexis Juliard | "Hello" (Lionel Richie) | Advanced |
| Florent | "Je n'ai que mon âme" (Natasha St. Pier) | Eliminated |
| Gabrielle Ducomble | "L'Air du vent" (Laura Mayne) | Advanced |
| Jordane | "Vivre la vie" (Kelly Joyce) | Eliminated |
| Julie | "La solitudine" (Laura Pausini) | Eliminated |
| Paco | "Sorry Seems to Be the Hardest Word" (Elton John) | Eliminated |
| Pauline | "Tu planes sur moi" (Native) | Eliminated |
| Priscilla | "Respect" (Aretha Franklin) | Eliminated |
| Shawn | "Jusqu'au bout" (David Charvet) | Eliminated |
| Yoann Kelyann | "Rêver" (Mylène Farmer) | Advanced |

==== Heat 2 (1 May 2003) ====
| Artist | Song (original artists) | Result |
|---|---|---|
| Catherine | "S'il suffisait d'aimer" (Celine Dion) | Eliminated |
| Cindie Bruzzi | "Dans un autre monde" (Celine Dion) | Advanced |
| David | "Mon frère" (Maxime Le Forestier) | Eliminated |
| Diane | "En attendant ses pas" (Celine Dion) | Eliminated |
| Jean Sébastien Lavoie | "Quand les hommes vivront d'amour" (Raymond Lévesque) | Advanced |
| Jonatan Cerrada | "I Want You Back" (The Jackson 5) | Advanced |
| Laure-Anne | "Evidemment" (France Gall) | Eliminated |
| Nabyl | "Sacrifice" (Elton John) | Eliminated |
| Priscilla | "Humana" (Lara Fabian) | Eliminated |
| Sébastien | "On va s'aimer" (Gilbert Montagné) | Eliminated |

==== Heat 3 (8 May 2003) ====
| Artist | Song (original artists) | Result |
|---|---|---|
| Diyas | "Chère amie" (Marc Lavoine) | Eliminated |
| Isabelle | "Stop!" (Sam Brown) | Eliminated |
| Jonathan Hassen-Ali | "My Girl" (The Temptations) | Advanced |
| Kallagnani | "On My Own" (Frances Ruffelle) | Eliminated |
| Laetizia Alberti | "Manhattan-Kaboul" (Renaud & Axelle Red) | Advanced |
| Pascal | "One Moment in Time" (Whitney Houston) | Eliminated |
| Sandie | "J'y crois encore" (Lara Fabian) | Eliminated |
| Thierry Amiel | "Je suis malade" (Serge Lama) | Advanced |
| Veronique | "On se retrouvera" (Francis Lalanne) | Eliminated |
| Xavier | "Hymne à l'amour" (Johnny Hallyday) | Eliminated |

==== Live Show 1 (15 May 2003) ====
Theme: Contestant's Choice

| Artist | Song (original artists) | Result |
|---|---|---|
| Alexis Juliard | "When a Man Loves a Woman" (Percy Sledge) | Safe |
| Cindie Bruzzi | "La vie fait ce qu'elle veut" (Julie Zenatti) | Bottom two |
| Gabrielle Ducomble | "Saving All My Love for You" (Whitney Houston) | Eliminated |
| Jean Sébastien Lavoie | "Les uns contre les autres" (Fabienne Thibeault) | Safe |
| Jonatan Cerrada | "Je voulais te dire que je t'attends" (Michel Jonasz) | Safe |
| Jonathan Hassen-Ali | "The World's Greatest" (R. Kelly) | Safe |
| Laetizia Alberti | "Be My Baby" (Vanessa Paradis) | Safe |
| Priscilla | "I Will Always Love You" (Whitney Houston) | Safe |
| Thierry Amiel | "L'aigle noir" (Barbara) | Safe |
| Yoann Kelyann | "La fan de sa vie" (Zazie) | Bottom three |

==== Live Show 2 (22 May 2003) ====
Theme: My Birth Year

| Artist | Song (original artists) | Result |
|---|---|---|
| Alexis Juliard | "Can You Feel It" (The Jacksons) | Bottom two |
| Cindie Bruzzi | "Ella, elle l'a" (France Gall) | Bottom three |
| Jean Sébastien Lavoie | "We Are the Champions" (Queen) | Safe |
| Jonatan Cerrada | "Je marche seul" (Jean-Jacques Goldman) | Safe |
| Jonathan Hassen-Ali | "Do I Do" (Stevie Wonder) | Safe |
| Laetizia Alberti | "Diego libre dans sa tête" (France Gall) | Safe |
| Priscilla | "Kiss" (Prince) | Eliminated |
| Thierry Amiel | "Mon fils ma bataille" (Daniel Balavoine) | Safe |
| Yoann Kelyann | "Vivre ou survivre" (Daniel Balavoine) | Safe |

==== Live Show 3 (29 May 2003) ====
Theme: Film Hits

| Artist | Song (original artists) | Result |
|---|---|---|
| Alexis Juliard | "On se retrouvera" (Francis Lalanne) | Safe |
| Cindie Bruzzi | "Hot Stuff" (Donna Summer) | Eliminated |
| Jean Sébastien Lavoie | "Calling You" (Jevetta Steele) | Safe |
| Jonatan Cerrada | "Une histoire d'amour" (Mireille Mathieu) | Safe |
| Jonathan Hassen-Ali | "Pauvres diables" (Julio Iglesias) | Bottom two |
| Laetizia Alberti | "T'en a pas" (Elsa Lunghini) | Safe |
| Thierry Amiel | "All by Myself" (Eric Carmen) | Bottom three |
| Yoann Kelyann | "Beautiful Stranger" (Madonna) | Safe |

==== Live Show 4 (5 June 2003) ====
Theme: Pop Hits

| Artist | Song (original artists) | Result |
|---|---|---|
| Alexis Juliard | "Killing Me Softly" (The Fugees) | Bottom two |
| Jean Sébastien Lavoie | "Chanter pour ceux qui sont loin de chez eux" (Michel Berger) | Safe |
| Jonatan Cerrada | "Les trois cloches" (Edith Piaf) | Safe |
| Jonathan Hassen-Ali | "Your Song" (Elton John) | Eliminated |
| Laetizia Alberti | "Eternal Flame" (The Bangles) | Safe |
| Thierry Amiel | "La vie ne m'apprend rien" (Daniel Balavoine) | Safe |
| Yoann Kelyann | "Pas toi" (Jean-Jacques Goldman) | Bottom three |

==== Live Show 5 (12 June 2003) ====
Theme: Funky Hits

| Artist | Song (original artists) | Result |
|---|---|---|
| Alexis Juliard | "Je l'aime à mourir" (Francis Cabrel) | Safe |
| Jean Sébastien Lavoie | "Le chanteur" (Daniel Balavoine) | Safe |
| Jonatan Cerrada | "Le coup de soleil" (Richard Cocciante) | Safe |
| Laetizia Alberti | "Marcia Baila" (Rita Mitsouko) | Bottom two |
| Thierry Amiel | "Quand on n'a que l'amour" (Jacques Brel) | Safe |
| Yoann Kelyann | "Sur la route" (Gérald de Palmas) | Eliminated |

==== Live Show 6 (19 June 2003) ====
Theme: Années 2000

| Artist | Song (original artists) | Result |
|---|---|---|
| Alexis Juliard | "Tu es mon autre" (Lara Fabian & Maurane) | Bottom two |
| Jean Sébastien Lavoie | "Entre nous" (Chimène Badi) | Safe |
| Jonatan Cerrada | "Suerté" (Shakira) | Safe |
| Laetizia Alberti | "Que tu reviennes" (Patrick Fiori) | Eliminated |
| Thierry Amiel | "En apesanteur" (Calogero) | Safe |

==== Live Show 7 (26 June 2003) ====
Theme: Le Voyage

| Artist | First song (original artists) | Second song | Result |
|---|---|---|---|
| Alexis Juliard | "Belle-Île-en-Mer, Marie-Galante" (Laurent Voulzy) | "Hotel California" (Eagles) | Eliminated |
| Jean Sébastien Lavoie | "Allumer le feu" (Johnny Hallyday) | "Unchained Melody" (The Righteous Brothers) | Safe |
| Jonatan Cerrada | "Emmenez-moi" (Charles Aznavour) | "Lettre à France" (Michel Polnareff) | Bottom two |
| Thierry Amiel | "Aller plus haut" (Tina Arena) | "Amsterdam" (Jacques Brel) | Safe |

==== Live Show 8: Semi-final (3 July 2003) ====
Theme: Hommage

| Artist | First song (original artists) | Second song | Result |
|---|---|---|---|
| Jean Sébastien Lavoie | "Doucement" (Liane Foly) | "Tu ne m'as pas laissé le temps" (David Hallyday) | Eliminated |
| Jonatan Cerrada | "Alors regarde" (Patrick Bruel) | "Vivre pour le meilleur" (Johnny Hallyday) | Safe |
| Thierry Amiel | "Casser la voix" (Patrick Bruel) | "Fan" (Pascal Obispo) | Safe |

==== Live final (10 July 2003) ====
| Artist | First song | Second song | Third song | Result |
|---|---|---|---|---|
| Jonatan Cerrada | "Je voulais te dire que je t'attends" | "Ma liberté de penser" | "The Show Must Go On" | Winner |
| Thierry Amiel | "Avec le temps" | "Je ne suis pas un héros" | "Les mots bleus" | Runner-up |
