= La Preuve du contraire =

La Preuve Du Contraire

Studio album by Jonatan Cerrada
- Released: 30 June 2005 (France)
- Recorded: 2005
- Genre: Pop
- Length: 59:08
- Label: Sony BMG

La Preuve Du Contraire is the second album by Jonatan Cerrada. Its title literally translates into 'The Proof of the Opposite' but means 'The Proof That It Is Wrong'.

Most of the songs are in French, but one track is in Spanish while one is partly Spanish (Con Los Años Que Me Quedan, a revival of Gloria Estefan's song) and another one is partly Italian (Amore).

This second album contains his hit single "'Libre Comme L'Air', and the soundtrack to the French version of the film Robots 'Mon Paradis'. The album features Ophelie Cassy in 'Ne M'en Veux Pas', which is his new single. However, the single version has been re-mixed and is no longer a duet.

- 3 Songs were only available on the special edition of La Preuve Du Contraire which also included a video on the making of 'Mon Paradis'.

== Track listing ==
#	Title	Length
1.	"Intro"	0:29
2.	"Libre Comme L'Air"	3:25
3.	"J'Apprends"	3:20
4.	"Interlude D'Automne"	0:35
5.	"Un Dimanche D'Automne"	3:39
6.	"La Preuve Du Contraire"	3:53
7.	"Cinéjo (Interlude)"	0:38
8.	"Ne M'en Veux Pas (Duet with Ophelie Cassy)"	3:54
9.	"Le Chaud Et Le Froid"	4:00
10.	"Pas Le Temps"	3:46
11.	"Interludio"	0:40
12.	"Ruban Noir"	4:44
13.	"L'Innocence"	3:22
14.	"On Ne Connait Personne"	3:37
15.	"Mon Paradis"	3:36
16.	"Amore"	4:33
17*.	"Pas Le Temps (Acoustic Version)"	3:31
18*.	"Un Dimanche D'Automne (Acoustic Version)"	3:33
19*.	"Con Los Años Que Me Quedan"	3:55
