= Toute une histoire =

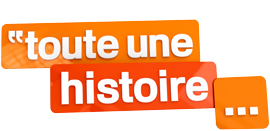
- Logo
- Presented by: Jean-Luc Delarue (2006-2010), Sophie Davant (2010-2016)
- Music by: Pascal Jambry
- Country of origin: France
- Original language: French
- No. of seasons: 10
- No. of episodes: ~2000

Production
- Producer: Stéphanie Guérin
- Running time: ~60 minutes

Original release
- Release: September 2006 – June 2016

Toute une histoire is a French television program broadcast on the French channel France 2 from 4 September 2006 to 24 June 2016. Jean-Luc Delarue was the show's first host, from September 2006 to early September 2010. Then Sophie Davant presented from September 2010 to June 2016.

From 13 May 2013 onward, the show was made thirty minutes longer in order to include a new part called L'histoire continue, allowing the viewers to catch up on the guests who had appeared on set in the past. At the start of the next year, the two parts were split into two distinct shows, although broadcast successively.

== Broadcast ==
The program was broadcast on France 2 from Monday to Friday from 2 to 3 p.m., followed by L'histoire continue starting from May 2013, broadcast from 3.10 to 3.40 p.m. The latter, derived from Toute une histoire, invited former guests to take stock of their progress.

Every two months, special editions of Toute une histoire offered to bring back former guests to give news, before the spin-off L'histoire continue, essentially based on this concept, was established.

For a while, the Wednesday show was dedicated to celebrities.

During bank holidays and long weekends, reruns of Toute une histoire were available on the channel.

Following the good ratings of 2011, the 24 May 2011, Sophie Davant hosted a special prime time, live on air from 8.40 to 10.35 pm, based on the theme "Couples of mixed nationalities: the fight for love". It was ranked third in the top of the evening's ratings, behind TF1 and France 3 but in front of M6.

The show was also broadcast in Belgium on Club RTL from Monday to Friday (5.10 p.m.) and in Western Switzerland on RTS Un (1.15 p.m.). The show was always broadcast on France 2 one day after it had been broadcast on RTS Un, meaning that the latter was the first one to broadcast the new shows. In Canada, the show was broadcast from Monday to Friday at 11 a.m. on the TV5 Québec channel.

On 16 April 2012, the opening credits of the show changed and were made longer with an extended jingle. The backstage area of the show still appeared on screen during the new credits, as it had before.

From 13 May 2013 onward, Toute une histoire was extended with L'histoire continue in order to fill the void left in the channel by the canceled German serial Storm of Love. From the beginning of the 2014 school year, Toute une histoire and L'histoire continue became two distinct TV shows, although broadcast one after the other on the public channel.

In 2016, the management of France Télévisions announced the end of the show's production after 10 years on the air. Broadcast on 24 June 2016, the last show recounts the best moments with the most emblematic guests' and specialists' accounts.

== Principle ==
Every day, the show broached various social themes: love, secrets, seduction, friendship, children, weight loss, relationships, break up, reunion, pregnancy, motherhood, fatherhood, lies, family, homosexuality, jealousy, parents, encounters, body issues, sexuality, single life, etc.

During the program, several guests talked about their issues or adventures to Sophie Davant, who questioned them quite directly on the matter. Three or four guests were present every day.

Interspersed with reports, the show was divided into two major parts written in the form of questions, which the participants and Sophie Davant (with sometimes a psychologist) tried to answer through a discussion.

For each part, Sophie Davant questioned the guests one after the other in order.

In the 8th season, in September 2013, the show used a new stage, bigger, brighter and red-orange colored. In September 2015, the stage changed again: the colored ambiance was now blue and yellow, whereas the guests' and participants' seats were reversed, with guests turning their back to the public.

== Delarue replaced by Davant ==
On 15 September 2010, following Jean-Luc Delarue's legal problems, the management of France Télévisions decided to remove the show from the France 2 schedule indefinitely. It was then replaced by Le Grenier de Sébastien, which was in turn replaced by Fait divers, le mag starting from 20 September 2016 due to bad ratings.

On 27 September 2010, Sophie Davant was appointed in the interim to take the helm of the show. On 27 October 2010, the management of France Télévisions announced to her that she was now officially in charge. She has also presented the show C'est au programme every morning on France 2 from 9.50 to 10.50 since 7 September 1998. She went to the set of Toute une histoire twice per week to record three shows starting from 2 p.m.

== Special edition ==
On 28 August 2012, in the second part of the evening at around 10:20pm, a special edition presented by Sophie Davant was broadcast live. It paid tribute to Jean-Luc Delarue, former showrunner of Toute une histoire, amongst others, and leading producer of French television, died on the night of 24 August 2012.

The name of the show was changed for the occasion into Toute son histoire. The set was also decorated for the event.

The program gave a retrospective of the presenter-producer's career by broadcasting numerous extracts. Among the many guests present on set to pay homage to him were Christophe Dechavanne, Rémy Pfimlin, Frédéric Mitteran, Daniela Lumbroso, Flioran Gazan, Flavie Flament and many more, as well as former guests of his shows, especially from Ça se discute.

This special edition dedicated to Jean-Luc Delarue attracted 2,249,000 viewers, amounting to 18.9% of market share, making it a leader in this time slot from 11.15 p.m. onward.
