= Sophie Davant =

French television presenter

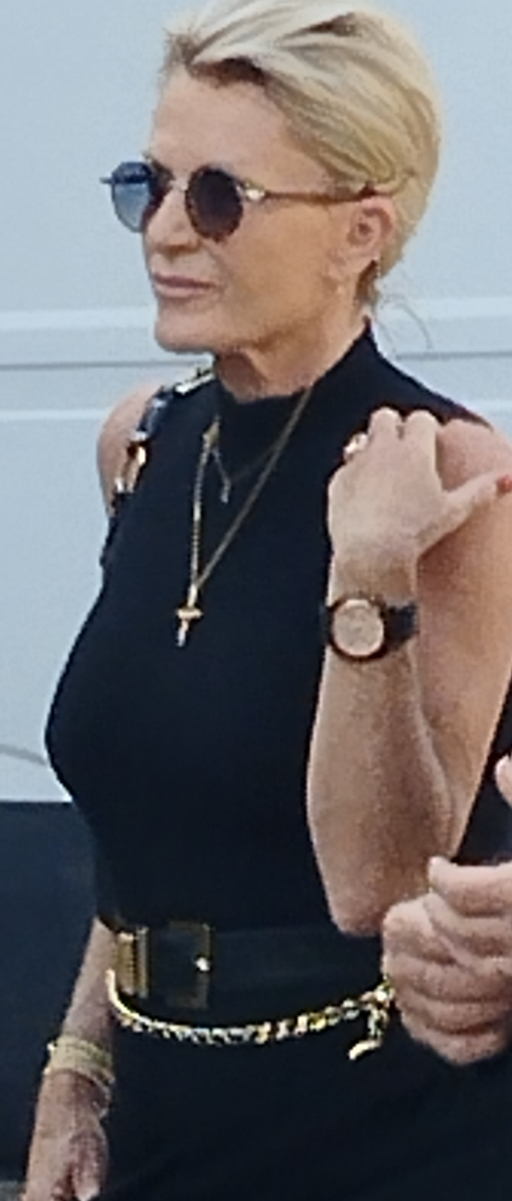
- Davant in 2025
- Born: 19 May 1963 (age 63); Bordeaux, France
- Occupations: Journalist, television presenter
- Years active: 1986–present
- Employer: France 2
- Known for: Presenter Affaire conclue
- Spouse: Pierre Sled (1991–2012) (separated)
- Partner: Érik Orsenna (2012–present)
- Children: 2

Sophie Davant (born 19 May 1963) is a French journalist and television presenter.

== Early life and education ==
She was born in Bordeaux in the department of Gironde. She graduated with a master of foreign languages in both English and German in Bordeaux. She studied in 1985 at the IUT de journalisme of Bordeaux.

== Television career ==
After an internship as an editor on the channel Antenne 2 in 1986, she worked at the 19/20 on the channel FR3. In 1987, she started presenting the weather on Antenne 2. In 1989, she co-hosted Aventures Voyages and also hosted Télématin.

From 1990 to 1992, she co-hosted with Patrice Laffont the game show Fort Boyard. From January to June 1992, she presented La Piste de Xapatan from Mexico on Antenne 2. She also portrayed herself in Fort Boyaux, a parody of Fort Boyard by Les Inconnus.

She was later named director of the weather service on France 2 but continued hosting or co-hosting several programs such as Sportissimo with Gérard Holtz from September to November 1992, Campus in July and August 1995 with Jean-Luc Reichmann and Prima donna with Patrick Sébastien in 2001.

Since September 1998, she hosts the morning program C'est au programme on France 2 (initially titled Tout un programme). She co-hosted on 2 June 2001 25 ans de chance with Patrick Sébastien on France 2, a special program dedicated to the 25 years of the Loto.

In 2004, she co-hosted with her husband Pierre Sled on France 3 the French selection to access at the final of the Junior Eurovision Song Contest on the program Eurovision Junior: la sélection. In September 2006, she handed over her responsibility for the weather service on France 2 to Laurent Romejko. Since 1997, she has co-hosted with several presenters the Téléthon every first weekend of December. From 2010 to 2016, with C'est au programme and Téléthon, she presented Toute une histoire on France 2.

== Personal life ==
In 1991, Davant married the journalist and television presenter Pierre Sled. The couple have two children, a son Nicolas (born 1993) and a daughter Valentine (born 1995). They separated in early 2012.

Since March 2012, Davant has been in a relationship with French novelist and academician Érik Orsenna.

== Honours ==
- Knight of the National Order of Merit (2004)

== Books ==
Sophie Davant has written or co-written the following books:

- Le Dico du bonheur en 100 mots, Éditions Mango, 2007. ISBN 978-2-84270-670-8
- Le Bonheur au féminin, Éditions Mango, 2008. ISBN 978-2-84270-811-5
- Les Petits Plats dans l'écran: les meilleures recettes de l'émission, Éditions Mango, 2008. ISBN 978-2-84270-808-5
- Au-delà: grandir après la perte, Michel Lafon, 2009. ISBN 978-2-7499-0986-8
