= Jonatan Cerrada =

Belgian singer (born 1985)

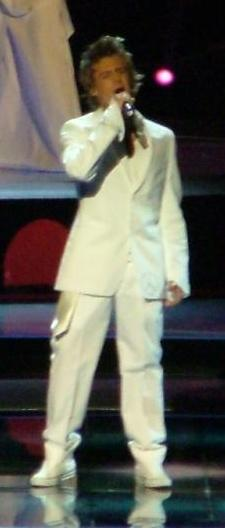
- Jonatan Cerrada performing for France during Eurovision Song Contest 2004

Background information
- Born: Jonatan Cerrada Moreno; 12 September 1985 (age 41); Liège, Belgium
- Genre: Pop
- Years active: 2003–present
- Labels: BMG (2003-2004); Sony BMG (2004-2007)

Jonatan Cerrada Moreno (born 12 September 1985) is a Belgian singer. He won the first season of Nouvelle Star (the French edition of Pop Idol) in 2003 and represented France in the Eurovision Song Contest 2004.

== Personal life ==
Jonatan Cerrada Moreno was born in Liège, Belgium, and grew up in Ans with his four siblings (Julien, Rafaël, Audrey and Rachel) and his Spanish parents María Victoria Moreno, a secretary, and Valentín Cerrada, a mechanical technician. He was eight years old when he entered the Opéra Royal de Wallonie in Liège where he stayed until age fourteen. He speaks fluent French, Spanish, English and basic Indonesian. He currently lives in Bali.

== Professional career ==
Cerrada won the first season of Nouvelle Star in 2003. Soon after winning the competition, he released his debut single "Je voulais te dire que je t'attends", a revival of a song originally by Michel Jonasz, and then "Rien ne me changera". His debut album, Siempre 23, was released after that and was successful across France and Belgium. Cerrada represented France in the Eurovision Song Contest 2004 singing a power ballad song, "À chaque pas", and came 15th out of 24 finalist countries.

Cerrada was invited to star as a guest in the Spanish comedy/drama Un Paso Adelante, which also aired in France with French dubbing, and he dubbed his own lines.

Cerrada sang the soundtrack for the French edition of the film Robots – "Mon Paradis". Soon after that, his second album La Preuve du contraire was released. In September 2005, "Libre comme l'air" was released only in Belgium. In March 2006, it was confirmed his next single was to be "Ne m'en veux pas" which appeared on La Preuve du contraire as a duet with Ophélie Cassy. A new solo version was recorded but was never released. In February 2007, a year after his latest single "Ruban noir" (from La Preuve du contraire) became a major download hit without any specific promotion. It is sung partly in Spanish and is about the 11 March 2004 Madrid train bombings. In June/July 2007, he took the title role of Arthur Rimbaud in the semi-staged comedy musical Rimbaud, written by Richard Charest & Arnaud Kerane ()

Cerrada is no longer signed by the major record label that released his first two French albums. Instead, he started working on a Spanish album as independently. In May 2007, he created a new Myspace site Tercero, showcasing songs, all sung in Spanish, with a distinct Latin and R&B style. In July 2007, he signed up to the Sellaband website aiming to find "believers" willing to buy "parts" (funding) the recording of his third album. Regularly appearing in the top three of Sellaband's charts, he managed to collect $25,000 (half of the required $50,000), before deciding to leave the website in October 2007. He stated that even though he had written the lyrics, he was not the composer of his proposed songs. The composer did not wish to give a percentage of earnings to Sellaband and was unwilling to proceed. His Sellaband blog also revealed his disappointment at being dropped by a major record company. On Sellaband, his profile, blog, and updates were in English.

In January 2018, Cerrada released an Indonesian single entitled "Lelaki Lain Di Hati", written by Valiant Budi Yogi or well known as Vabyo. He felt challenged after his friend offered him to sing Indonesian song. This song became popular in Indonesia because it is rare for a foreign singer to release an Indonesian single. ()

== Discography ==
=== Albums ===
Title	Year	Peak positions		
Title	Year	FRA	BEL (Wa)	SWI
Siempre 23	2003	7	5	52
La Preuve du contraire	2005	29	25	–

Other releases

- Tercero, previously collected believers for this project on Sellaband.

=== Singles ===
Title	Year	Peak positions			Album
Title	Year	FRA	BEL (Wa)	SWI	Album
"Je voulais te dire que je t'attends"	2002	2	1	9	Siempre 23
"Rien ne me changera"	2003	22	6	61	Siempre 23
"Non, laissez-moi le temps"	2004	84	–	–	
"À chaque pas"	2004	12	5	36	Siempre 23 (re-release)
"Libre comme l'air"	2005	–	28	–	La Preuve du contraire
"Ruban noir"	2007	–	28	–	La Preuve du contraire

Other releases

- "Mon Paradis" (download only)
- Ne m'en veux pas" (promo only)
- "Lelaki Lain Di Hati" (2018)

== Filmography ==
- 2018 : Liam dan Laila : Liam
