= Je voulais te dire que je t'attends =

Single by Jonatan Cerrada

from the album Siempre 23
- B-side: "Lettre à France"
- Released: 21 July 2003
- Recorded: 2003
- Genre: Pop
- Length: 4:04
- Label: Sony BMG
- Songwriter(s): Michel Jonasz; Millmer Peter
- Producer(s): Jean-Claude Chachaty

Jonatan Cerrada singles chronology
"Je voulais te dire que je t'attends" (2003)	"Rien ne me changera" (2003)

"Je voulais te dire que je t'attends" is a ballad song originally recorded in 1976 by the French singer Michel Jonasz. It was covered by The Manhattan Transfer in 1978 on the album Pastiche (fourth track), and released as a double A-sided single with a cover of Where Did Our Love Go reaching No 40 in the UK singles chart. Also by Isabelle Boulay, Diane Dufresne Maurane and Patrick Bruel in 2001 for Les Enfoirés' album L'Odysée des Enfoirés, and by Hoda, Lucie and Sofiane, three contestants of the French version of Star Academy 4 whose cover is available on the 2004 album Les Meilleurs Moments.

The most famous cover version was that of Belgian singer Jonatan Cerrada in 2003, the only one that was released as a single, which achieved a great success in Belgium (Wallonia), France and Switzerland. The song was the debut single for the singer from his album Siempre 23, on which it features as fourth track.

== Track listings ==
CD single

1. "Je voulais te dire que je t'attends" — 4:04
2. "Lettre à France" (live) — 3:04

Digital download

1. "Je voulais te dire que je t'attends" — 4:04

== Charts and sales ==
=== Weekly charts ===
Chart (2003)	Peak position
Belgium (Ultratop 50 Wallonia)	1
France (SNEP)	2
Switzerland (Schweizer Hitparade)	9

=== Year-end charts ===
Chart (2003)	Position
Belgian (Ultratop 50 Wallonia)	4
French (SNEP)	21
Swiss Singles Chart	40

=== Certifications ===
Certifications for "Je voulais te dire que je t'attends"
Region	Certification	Certified units/sales
Belgium (BRMA)	Platinum	50,000^{*}
France (SNEP)	Gold	250,000^{*}
^{*} Sales figures based on certification alone.
