= Orelsan discography =

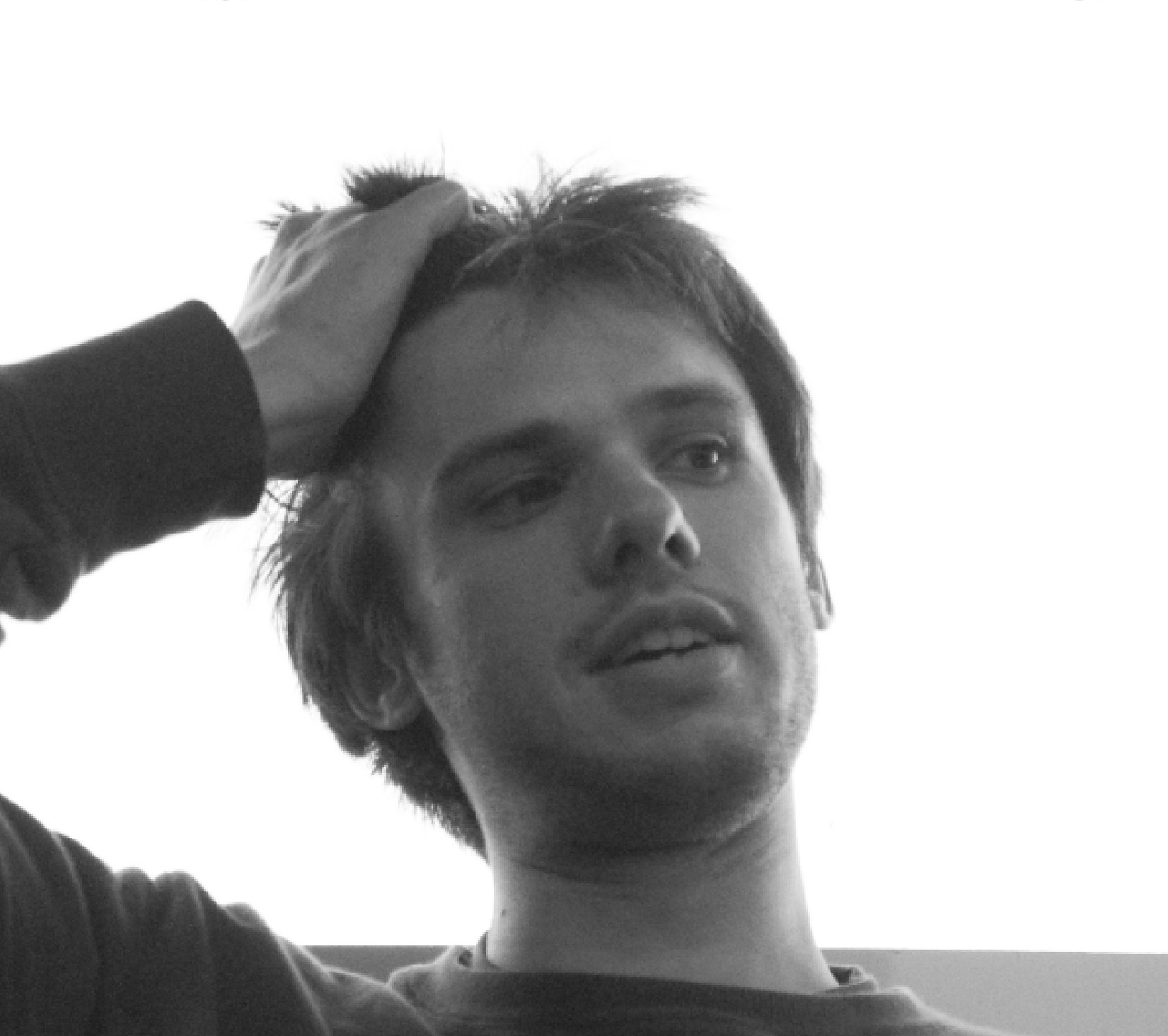
- Orelsan in 2013
- Studio albums: 5
- EPs: 2
- Singles: 18
- Music videos: 29
- Mixtapes: 1

The following article outlines the discography of French rapper, songwriter and record producer Orelsan, which includes five solo studio albums, two extended plays and multiple singles. He is also one half of the French hip hop duo Casseurs Flowters, along with Gringe, with whom he has released two studio albums.

His first single, "Changement", was released in 2008 as the lead single from his first studio album, Perdu d'avance, which was released in 2009. His first extended play, Zéro, was released in 2010. His second studio album, Le chant des sirènes, was released in 2011. "RaelSan" was released as the lead single from the album, with five more singles released from the album thereafter.

Together with fellow rapper Gringe, Orelsan released Orelsan et Gringe sont les Casseurs Flowters, in 2013 as the duo Casseurs Flowters. "Bloqué" was released as the lead single from the album. In 2015, the two followed up with their second studio album as a duo, Comment c'est loin, which is also a soundtrack album for their film of the same name. "À l'heure où je me couche" was released as the album's lead single.

On 20 September 2017, Orelsan released the first single from his third solo studio album, titled "Basique", along with its music video which went viral, generating in excess of 100 million views on YouTube. On 20 October 2017, the album La fête est finie was released, to huge critical and commercial success, selling over one million copies in France.

Civilisation, his fourth solo studio album, was released on 19 November 2021. It topped the French Albums Chart and Belgian (Wallonia) Ultratop record chart. Most notable singles from the album include "L'odeur de l'essence", "Jour meilleur" and "La Quête".

La fuite en avant, his fifth solo studio album, was released on 7 November 2025. It also topped the French Albums Chart and Belgian (Wallonia) Ultratop record chart, and was certified platinum in France, while the album's lead single, "Ailleurs", was certified gold.

== Albums ==
=== Studio albums ===
| Title | Album details | Peak chart positions | | | | Certifications |
| Title | Album details | FRA | BEL (FL) | BEL (WA) | SWI | Certifications |
|---|---|---|---|---|---|---|
| Perdu d'avance | Released: 16 February 2009; Format: Digital download, CD; Label: 3ème Bureau, 7th Magnitude | 64 | — | 20 | — | SNEP: Platinum |
| Le chant des sirènes | Released: 26 September 2011; Format: Digital download, CD; Label: 3ème Bureau, 7th Magnitude, Wagram Music | 3 | — | 10 | 31 | SNEP: 3× Platinum |
| La fête est finie | Released: 20 October 2017; Format: Digital download, CD; Label: 3ème Bureau, 7th Magnitude, Wagram Music | 1 | 36 | 1 | 2 | SNEP: 2× Diamond; BEA: Gold |
| Civilisation | Released: 19 November 2021; Format: Digital download, CD; Label: 3ème Bureau, 7th Magnitude, Wagram Music | 1 | 11 | 1 | 2 | SNEP: Diamond |
| La fuite en avant | Released: 7 November 2025; Format: Digital download, CD; Label: 3ème Bureau, 7th Magnitude, Wagram Music | 1 | 60 | 1 | 2 | SNEP: Platinum |

=== Collaborative albums ===
| Title | Album details | Peak chart positions | | | Certifications |
| Title | Album details | FRA | BEL (WA) | SWI | Certifications |
|---|---|---|---|---|---|
| Orelsan et Gringe sont les Casseurs Flowters (with Gringe as Casseurs Flowters) | Released: 15 November 2013; Format: Digital download, CD; Label: 7th Magnitude, Wagram Music | 8 | 29 | 40 | SNEP: Platinum |
| Comment c'est loin (with Gringe as Casseurs Flowters) | Released: 9 December 2015; Format: Digital download, CD; Label: 3ème Bureau, 7th Magnitude, Wagram Music | 24 | 61 | 83 | SNEP: Platinum |

=== Mixtape ===
| Title | Notes |
|---|---|
| Fantasy: Episode 1 (with Gringe as Casseurs Flowters) | Released: 2004; Format: Digital download |

== Extended plays ==
| Title | Notes |
|---|---|
| Zéro | Released: 2010; Format: Digital download |
| N'importe comment (with The Toxic Avenger) | Released: 2010; Format: Digital download |

== Singles ==
=== As lead artist ===
| Single | Year | Peak chart positions | | | Certifications | Album |
| Single | Year | FRA | BEL (WA) | SWI | Certifications | Album |
|---|---|---|---|---|---|---|
| "Changement" | 2008 | — | — | — | | Perdu d'avance |
| "RaelSan" | 2011 | 77 | — | — | | Le chant des sirènes |
| "Double vie" | 2011 | — | — | — | | Le chant des sirènes |
| "Plus rien ne m'étonne" | 2011 | 46 | — (Note: "Plus rien ne m'étonne" did not enter the Ultratop 50, but peaked at number 35 on the Wallonian Ultratip chart.) | — | | Le chant des sirènes |
| "Suicide social" | 2011 | 53 | — | — | | Le chant des sirènes |
| "La terre est ronde" | 2011 | 15 | — (Note: "La terre est ronde" did not enter the Wallonian Ultratip chart, but peaked at number 9 on the Ultratop 50 chart.) | — (Note: "La terre est ronde" did not enter the Singles Top 100, but peaked at number 20 on the Romandy Top 20 Singles chart.) | | Le chant des sirènes |
| "Ils sont cools" (featuring Gringe) | 2011 | 66 | 31 | — | | Le chant des sirènes |
| "Si seul" | 2011 | 176 | — | — | | Le chant des sirènes |
| "Basique" | 2017 | 9 | 10 | 69 | SNEP: Diamond | La fête est finie |
| "La pluie" (featuring Stromae) | 2017 | 10 | 2 | — (Note: "La pluie" did not enter the Singles Top 100, but peaked at number 15 on the Romandy Top 20 Singles chart.) | SNEP: Diamond | La fête est finie |
| "Rêves bizarres" (featuring Damso) | 2018 | 1 | 1 | 15 | SNEP: Diamond | Épilogue (re-release of La fête est finie) |
| "Millions" (with Ninho) | 2021 | 3 | 3 | 74 | SNEP: Diamond | No Limit (compilation album) |
| "L'odeur de l'essence" | 2021 | 1 | 4 | 19 | SNEP: Diamond | Civilisation |
| "Jour meilleur" | 2021 | 1 | 27 | — | SNEP: Diamond | Civilisation |
| "La quête" | 2021 | 2 | 12 | 20 | SNEP: Diamond | Civilisation |
| "Du propre" | 2021 | 3 | — | 25 | SNEP: Diamond | Civilisation |
| "Ensemble" (featuring Skread) | 2021 | 15 | — | — | SNEP: Gold | Civilisation |
| "Évidemment" (with Angèle) | 2022 | 4 | 10 | 65 | SNEP: Platinum | Civilisation Édition Ultime |
| "Ailleurs" | 2025 | 7 | 12 | 54 | SNEP: Gold | La fuite en avant |
with Casseurs Flowters
| "Bloqué" | 2013 | 70 | 40 | — | | Orelsan et Gringe sont les Casseurs Flowters |
| "À l'heure où je me couche" | 2015 | 34 | — | — | SNEP: Gold | Comment c'est loin |

=== As featured artist ===
| Single | Year | Peak chart positions | | | Certifications | Album |
| Single | Year | FRA | BEL (WA) | SWI | Certifications | Album |
|---|---|---|---|---|---|---|
| "Ma grosse" (Nessbeal featuring Orelsan) | 2010 | — | — | — | | NE2S |
| "D.P.M.O. (remix)" (Professor Green featuring Orelsan) | 2012 | 160 | — | — | | Non-album single |
| "Ne regrette rien" (Benjamin Biolay featuring Orelsan) | 2012 | 157 | — | — | | Vengeance |
| "Mon pote" (Flynt featuring Orelsan) | 2012 | 185 | — | — | | Itinéraire bis |
| "AVF" (Stromae featuring Maître Gims and Orelsan) | 2013 | 43 | 38 | — | | Racine carrée |
| "La nuit c'est fait pour dormir" (Maître Gims featuring Orelsan & H Magnum) | 2018 | 83 | — | — | | Ceinture noire |
| "Potentiel" (Lefa featuring Orelsan) | 2018 | 41 | — | — | | 3 du mat |
| "Le temps" (MHD featuring Orelsan) | 2018 | 58 | — | — | | 19 |
| "Qui dit mieux" (Gringe feat. Orelsan, Vald & Suikon Blaz AD) | 2018 | 24 | — | — | | Enfant lune |
| "Déchiré" (Gringe feat. Orelsan) | 2018 | 67 | — | — | | Enfant lune |
| "La vérité" (Lomepal feat. Orelsan) | 2018 | 5 | — (Note: "La vérité" did not enter the Ultratop 50, but peaked at number 8 on the Wallonian Ultratip chart.) | — | SNEP: Gold | Jeannine |
| "À qui la faute" (Kery James featuring Orelsan) | 2019 | 94 | — | — | | |
| "Toujours plus" (Lorenzo featuring Orelsan) | 2019 | — | 13 | — | | Sex in the City |
| "Ma Life" (Oxmo Puccino featuring Orelsan) | 2019 | 140 | — | — | | |
| "Peon" (Vald featuring Orelsan) | 2022 | 1 | 33 | — | SNEP: Gold | V |
| "Jour Meilleur (Edit)" (Lost Frequencies featuring Orelsan) | 2023 | — | — | — | | Non-album single |

== Other charted songs ==
| Song | Year | Peak chart positions | | | Certifications | Album |
| Song | Year | FRA | BEL (WA) | SWI | Certifications | Album |
|---|---|---|---|---|---|---|
| "Zone" (featuring Nekfeu and Dizzee Rascal) | 2017 | 12 | — | — | SNEP: Platinum | La fête est finie |
| "Notes pour trop tard" (featuring Ibeyi) | 2017 | 15 | — | 42 | SNEP: Diamond | La fête est finie |
| "San" | 2017 | 20 | — | 24 | SNEP: Diamond | La fête est finie |
| "Paradis" | 2017 | 32 | — | — | SNEP: Diamond | La fête est finie |
| "Défaite de famille" | 2017 | 33 | — | 40 | SNEP: Diamond | La fête est finie |
| "La fête est finie" | 2017 | 38 | — | — | SNEP: Platinum | La fête est finie |
| "Christophe" (featuring Maître Gims) | 2017 | 43 | — | — | SNEP: Gold | La fête est finie |
| "Tout va bien" | 2017 | 20 | 24 | — | SNEP: Diamond | La fête est finie |
| "Quand est-ce que ça s'arrête ?" | 2017 | 83 | — | — | SNEP: Platinum | La fête est finie |
| "Dans ma ville, on traîne" | 2017 | 105 | — | — | SNEP: Platinum | La fête est finie |
| "Bonne meuf" | 2017 | 107 | — | — | SNEP: Platinum | La fête est finie |
| "La lumière" | 2017 | 115 | — | — | SNEP: Gold | La fête est finie |
| "Fantômes" | 2018 | 19 | — | — | | Épilogue (re-release of La fête est finie) |
| "Tout va bien" (Remix) (featuring Eugy and Kojo Funds) | 2018 | 53 | — | — | SNEP: Gold | Épilogue (re-release of La fête est finie) |
| "Tout ce que je sais" (featuring YBN Cordae) | 2018 | 21 | — | — | | Épilogue (re-release of La fête est finie) |
| "La famille, la famille" | 2018 | 13 | — | 98 | | Épilogue (re-release of La fête est finie) |
| "Mes grands-parents" | 2018 | 17 | — | — | | Épilogue (re-release of La fête est finie) |
| "Discipline" | 2018 | 27 | — | — | | Épilogue (re-release of La fête est finie) |
| "Adieu les filles" | 2018 | 14 | — | 100 | SNEP: Gold | Épilogue (re-release of La fête est finie) |
| "Excuses ou mensonges" | 2018 | 24 | — | — | | Épilogue (re-release of La fête est finie) |
| "Dis-moi" | 2018 | 28 | — | — | | Épilogue (re-release of La fête est finie) |
| "Epilogue" | 2018 | 15 | — | — | SNEP: Gold | Épilogue (re-release of La fête est finie) |
| "Shonen" | 2021 | 4 | — | — | SNEP: Platinum | Civilisation |
| "Seul avec du monde autour" | 2021 | 6 | — | — | SNEP: Platinum | Civilisation |
| "Casseurs Flowters Infinity" | 2021 | 7 | — | — | SNEP: Platinum | Civilisation |
| "Rêve mieux" | 2021 | 8 | — | — | SNEP: Gold | Civilisation |
| "Baise le monde" | 2021 | 10 | — | — | SNEP: Gold | Civilisation |
| "Bébéboa" | 2021 | 11 | — | — | SNEP: Gold | Civilisation |
| "Manifeste" | 2021 | 12 | — | — | SNEP: Gold | Civilisation |
| "Civilisation" | 2021 | 16 | — | — | SNEP: Gold | Civilisation |
| "Athéna" | 2021 | 17 | — | — | SNEP: Platinum | Civilisation |
| "Dernier verre" (featuring The Neptunes) | 2021 | 18 | — | — | SNEP: Gold | Civilisation |
| "Le pacte" | 2025 | 13 | 38 | — | | La fuite en avant |
| "Boss" | 2025 | 9 | 35 | 69 | | La fuite en avant |
| "Soleil levant" (with SDM) | 2025 | 5 | 31 | 42 | | La fuite en avant |
| "Encore une fois" (with Yamé) | 2025 | 10 | 35 | — | | La fuite en avant |
with Casseurs Flowters
| "La mort du disque" | 2013 | 57 | — | — | | Orelsan et Gringe sont les Casseurs Flowters |
| "Fais les backs" | 2013 | 115 | — | — | | Orelsan et Gringe sont les Casseurs Flowters |
| "Dans la place pour être" | 2013 | 43 (Note: "Dans la place pour être" did not enter the Ultratop 50, but peaked at number 43 on the Wallonian Ultratip chart.) | 34 | — | | Orelsan et Gringe sont les Casseurs Flowters |
| "Regarde comme il fait beau (dehors)" | 2013 | 58 | — (Note: "Regarde comme il fait beau (dehors)" did not enter the Ultratop 50, but peaked at number 3 on the Wallonian Ultratip chart.) | — | | Orelsan et Gringe sont les Casseurs Flowters |
| "Inachevés" | 2015 | 101 | — | — | | Comment c'est loin |
| "Si facile" | 2015 | 174 | — | — | | Comment c'est loin |

== Guest appearances ==
List of guest appearances, with other performing artists, showing year released and album name
| Title | Year | Other artist(s) | Album |
|---|---|---|---|
| "No Life" (remix) | 2009 | Nessbeal | RSC Sessions Perdues |
| "Je rêve en enfer" | 2010 | Jena Lee | Ma référence |
| "Ma grosse" | 2010 | Nessbeal | NE2S |
| "The Experience" | 2011 | MC Melodee, Frenkie, Curse, Mariama, Remi, Rival, Valete, GMB, Marcus Price, Shot, Nach, Luche, Pitcho | Diversidad – The Experience Album |
| "We Don't Sleep" | 2011 | Marcus Price, Pitcho, Nach, Remi | Diversidad – The Experience Album |
| "Nouveau monde" | 2011 | Curse, Luche | Diversidad – The Experience Album |
| "Cookin' in Your Pot" | 2011 | Marcus Price, Mariama, Curse, MC Melodee, Luche | Diversidad – The Experience Album |
| "Slow Down" | 2011 | Rival, Valete, Shot, Frenkie | Diversidad – The Experience Album |
| "La machine" | 2011 | Luce | Première Phalange |
| "Tu vas prendre cher" | 2011 | La Fouine | Capital du crime, Vol. 3 |
| "Mauvais plan" | 2012 | Canardo, Gringe | À la youv |
| "Go Go Gadget" | 2012 | Disiz | Extra-lucide |
| "Mon pote" | 2012 | Flynt | Itinéraire bis |
| "D.P.M.O." (remix) | 2012 | Professor Green | —N/a |
| "C'est beau de rêver" | 2012 | Taipan, Gringe | Dans le circuit |
| "Dernier MC" (remix) | 2013 | Kery James, Fababy, Ladéa, Lino, Médine, REDK, S.A.M., Scylla, Tunisiano | Dernier MC |
| "Ceci n'est pas un Clip V: Sharingan" | 2013 | Maître Gims, 1solent, The Shin Sekaï | —N/a |
| "Courage fuyons" | 2013 | Médine | Protest Song |
| "Lève les draps" | 2013 | Seth Gueko | Bad Cowboy |
| "AVF" | 2013 | Stromae, Maître Gims | Racine carrée |
| "Accélère" | 2014 | Isleym | Où ça nous mène |
| "Can I Live" | 2014 | Murkage | Of Mystics and Misfits |
| "Les portes du pénitencier" (Version longue) | 2014 | Shtar Academy, Bakar, Gringe, Keny Arkana, Lino, Médine, Nor, Nekfeu, Nemir, REDK, Sat, Alonzo, Soprano, Tékila, Vincenzo | Shtar Academy |

== Music videos ==
| Year | Title | Director |
|---|---|---|
| 2006 | "Ramen" (as Orel) | Orelsan |
| 2008 | "Changement" | Not available |
| 2009 | "No Life" | Pasquale Pagano |
| 2009 | "La peur de l'échec" | David Tomaszewski |
| 2011 | "RaelSan" | David Tomaszewski |
| 2011 | "Différent" | Matthieu Valluet |
| 2011 | "Soirée ratée" | Jay Veesualz |
| 2011 | "1990" (appearances by Oxmo Puccino, Olivier Cachin and members of 1995) | Not available |
| 2011 | "Suicide social" | Mathieu Foucher |
| 2011 | "Plus rien ne m'étonne" | David Tomaszewski |
| 2011 | "RaelSan" (remixed video) | Not available |
| 2011 | "La terre est ronde" | Not available |
| 2012 | "Ils sont cools" (feat. Gringe) | David Tomaszewski |
| 2012 | "Si seul" | David Tomaszewski |
| 2017 | "Basique" | Greg&Lio |
| 2017 | "Tout va bien" | Greg&Lio |
| 2018 | "Défaite de famille" | Orelsan |
| 2018 | "Paradis" | Orelsan |
| 2018 | "La pluie" (feat. Stromae) | Paul, Luc & Martin |
| 2018 | "Rêve bizarres" | Adrien Lagier & Ousmane Ly |
| 2019 | "Discipline" | Adrien Lagier & Ousmane Ly |
| 2019 | "Tout ce que je sais" | Simon David |
| 2019 | "Dis moi" | Orelsan |
| 2019 | "Fantômes" | Luke Monaghan |
| 2021 | "L'odeur de l'essence" | David Tomaszewski |
| 2021 | "Jour meilleur" | David Tomaszewski |
| 2022 | "La Quête" | Victor Haegelin |
| 2022 | "Du propre" | Kourtrajmeuf |
| 2022 | "Ensemble " | Quentin Deronzier |
with Casseurs Flowters
| 2013 | "Bloqué" | David Tomaszewski |
| 2013 | "La mort du disque" | Not available |
| 2013 | "Regarde comme il fait beau (dehors)" | Not available |
| 2014 | "Fais les backs" | David Tomaszewski |
| 2014 | "Change de pote" | Jiwee, Orelsan |
| 2014 | "Des histoires à raconter" | Greg&Lio |
| 2015 | "À l'heure où je me couche" | Christophe Offenstein |
| 2016 | "J'essaye, j'essaye" | Orelsan, Clément Cotentin |
| 2016 | "Quand ton père t'engueule" | Not available |
| 2016 | "Le mal est fait" | Not available |

== Production ==
=== 2011 ===
Orelsan – Le chant des sirènes

- 9. "La petite marchande de porte-clefs" (co-produced with Marc Chouarain)

=== 2013 ===
Stromae – Racine carrée

- 4. "Ave cesaria" (co-produced with Stromae, Mauricio Delgados, Antonio Santos, Vincent Peirani and Schérazade)
- 13. "AVF" (featuring Maître Gims and Orelsan; co-produced with Stromae, Maître Gims and Atom)

Casseurs Flowters – Orelsan et Gringe sont les Casseurs Flowters

- 8. "19h26 – La mort du disque"
- 16. "03h53 – Manger c'est tricher"

=== 2017 ===
Orelsan – La fête est finie

- 7. "Bonne meuf"

== See also ==
- Casseurs Flowters discography
