= Skread production discography =

Releases of French record producer

The following list is a discography of production by Skread, a French record producer and musician. It includes a list of songs produced, co-produced and remixed by year, artist, album and title.

== 2004 ==
=== Booba – Panthéon ===
- 01. "Tallac"
- 07. "Baby" (featuring Nessbeal)

=== Nysay – L'asphaltape ===
- 03. "Le biz a changé"
- 07. "La course à l'argent"
- 13. "Pow"

=== Nysay – Starting Blocks ===
- 04. "Anacronik"
- 12. "Maro"
- 13. "Black Coko"
- 15. "H.10.STREEKT"
- 24. "Doums Layzi" (featuring Furax)

=== Street Lourd – Street Lourd Hall Stars ===
- 02. "Haute criminologie" (featuring Rim'K and Lino)
- 03. "Du 93 au 94" (featuring Kool Shen and Serum)
- 05. "La Hass" (featuring Intouchable, Kamelancien and Rohff)
- 09. "Parce que le monde" (featuring Diam's and Kennedy)
- 19. "Le sang des tours" (featuring Dicidens)
- 20. "En mode 2" (featuring Rohff)

== 2005 ==
=== Booba – Autopsie, Vol. 1 ===
CD 2

- 14. "Rap de paria" (Nessbeal)

=== Brasco and El Matador – Bombattak MC's ===
- 02. "Notre revanche" (El Matador featuring Brasco)
- 03. "Ma zermi" (Brasco)
- 04. "C'est la merde" (El Matador)
- 05. "Soldats" (El Matador featuring Brasco and Gringe)
- 08. "Rat du macadam" (Gringe)
- 15. "13 NRV" (El Matador)
- 16. "Big Ben" (Brasco)
- 18. "Le seul, l'unique" (Brasco)
- 19. "Notre revanche" (El Matador featuring Le Rat Luciano)

=== IV My People – Mission ===
- 13. "Ma Jeunesse"

=== LIM – Enfant du ghetto ===
- 05. "À ce qu'il paraît" (featuring Mo'Vez Lang)

=== Lino – Paradis assassiné ===
- 02. "Stress"
- 11. "Macadam Philosophie"

=== Rohff – Au-delà de mes limites ===
CD 1

- 08. "La Hass (version 2)"

CD 2

- 04. "En mode 2"

=== Sinik – La main sur le cœur ===
- 02. "2 victimes / 1 coupable"

== 2006 ==
=== Diam's – Dans ma bulle ===
Spurce:

- 08. "Dans ma bulle"
- 15. "Petite banlieusarde"

=== DJ Whoo Kid and DJ Cut Killer – Mixtape Evolution ===
- 08. "Bomayé Music" (Youssoupha)
- 16. "Bienvenue à Massilia" (Psy 4 de la Rime)

=== Hostile Records – Hostile 2006 ===
- 16. "Emmuré Vivant" (Nessbeal)

=== Nessbeal – La mélodie des briques ===
- 01. "Intro"
- 02. "Rap de Tess"
- 04. "La mélodie des briques"
- 05. "Loin du rivage"
- 06. "10,000 Questions"
- 07. "Princesse au regard triste"
- 12. "Candidat au crime"
- 13. "Peur d'aimer"
- 14. "Funèste écriture"
- 15. "Chute libre" (featuring Dicidens)

=== Nysay – Au pied du mur ===
CD 1

- 15. "Vote ou crève"

CD 2

- 03. "Le biz a changé"
- 07. "La course à l'argent"
- 08. "États des lieux"
- 12. "Ma jeunesse"
- 15. "Pow"

== 2007 ==
=== El Matador – Parti de rien ===
- 05. "Mets-toi bien"
- 06. "Le péril jeune"
- 07. "C'est de la merde"

=== Passi – Evolution ===
- 13. "Romeo & Juliet 2000"

=== Salif – Boulogne Boy ===
- 01. "Yoyo"

== 2008 ==
=== Nessbeal – Rois sans couronne ===
- 01. "Rimes instinctives"
- 02. "Le loup dans la bergerie"
- 03. "Réalité française"
- 04. "H.L.M. Bonnie et Clyde"
- 06. "On aime ça"
- 09. "Autopsie d'une tragédie"
- 12. "Les anges aux visages sales"
- 14. "Clown triste"
- 15. "Casablanca"

=== Salif – Prolongations ===
CD 2

- 05. "Amateur de Brako"
- 07. "Ma jeunesse"
- 22. "Yoyo"

== 2009 ==
=== Frenesik Industry – Maghreb United ===
- 08. "Dicton du Bled" (Rim'K and Diam's)

=== Orelsan – Perdu d'avance ===
- 01. "Étoiles invisibles"
- 02. "Changement"
- 03. "Soirée ratée"
- 04. "Différent"
- 05. "No Life"
- 06. "Pour le pire"
- 07. "Perdu d'avance"
- 08. "Gros poissons dans une petite mare"
- 09. "Logo dans le ciel"
- 10. "50 pour cent"
- 11. "Jimmy Punchline"
- 12. "Entre bien et mal" (featuring Gringe)
- 13. "Courez Courez"
- 14. "Peur de l'échec" (featuring Ron "Bumblefoot" Thal)

=== Taipan – Punchliner ===
- 27. "No Life" (remix) (featuring Nessbeal and Orelsan)

== 2010 ==
=== Isleym – Avec le temps ===
- 02. "À chaque jour suffit sa peine" (remix)

=== Nessbeal – NE2S ===
- 02. "À chaque jour suffit sa peine"
- 03. "Ça bouge pas"
- 04. "After"
- 05. "Au bout de la route" (featuring La Fouine)
- 06. "Papa instable"
- 07. "La traversée du désert"
- 08. "I.L.S." (featuring Bradley Jones)
- 09. "Ma grosse" (featuring Orelsan)
- 10. "Je vole au-dessus de ça" (featuring Isleym)
- 13. "Balles dans le pied"
- 14. "Poussière d'empire"

== 2011 ==
=== Nessbeal – Sélection naturelle ===
- 05. "J'suis un salaud"
- 08. "La nébuleuse des aigles" (featuring Isleym)
- 10. "Soldat"
- 13. "La naissance du mal"
- 14. "Sélection naturelle"

=== Orelsan – Le chant des sirènes ===
- 01. "RaelSan"
- 02. "Le chant des sirènes"
- 03. "Plus rien ne m'étonne"
- 05. "Double vie"
- 06. "Finir mal"
- 07. "Si seul"
- 08. "Des trous dans la tête"
- 11. "1990"
- 12. "2010"
- 13. "La morale" (co-produced with Félipé Saldivia)
- 15. "Suicide social"
- 16. "Elle viendra quand même"

== 2013 ==
=== Casseurs Flowters – Orelsan et Gringe sont les Casseurs Flowters ===
- 02. "15h02 – Regarde comme il fait beau (dehors)" (co-produced with Fred Savio)
- 03. "15h45 – Stupide ¡ Stupide ¡ Stupide ¡"
- 04. "16h00 – Tu m'dois d'l'oseille"
- 06. "17h04 – Prends des pièces"
- 07. "18h30 – Bloqué"
- 09. "20h08 – Dans la place pour être"
- 11. "22h31 – Fais les backs" (co-produced with DJ Pone)
- 13. "01h16 – Les putes et moi" (co-produced with Vizioz)
- 14. "01h25 – Johnny Galoche"
- 15. "01h47 – Change de Pote"
- 17. "04h41 – Greenje et Orselane"
- 18. "06h16 – Des histoires à raconter"

== 2014 ==
=== Disiz – Transe-lucide ===
- 02. "Banlieusard Syndrome"

=== Isleym – Où ça nous mène ===
- 01. "Intro"
- 04. "Ange gardien"
- 06. "Grande sœur" (featuring Awa Imani)
- 10. "Petit bateau"
- 11. "Celles et ceux" (co-produced with Dany Synthé)
- 15. "Partir"

=== Redouanne Harjane – The Loser (single) ===
- 01. "The Loser"

== 2015 ==
=== Casseurs Flowters – Comment c'est loin ===
- 01. "Nouvelle journée"
- 02. "Au bout du compte"
- 03. "À l'heure où je me couche"
- 04. "Quand ton père t'engueule"
- 05. "En boucle"
- 06. "Faut qu'on rentre bosser"
- 07. "Freestyle Radio Phoenix"
- 08. "Le mal est fait"
- 09. "C'est toujours 2 connards dans un abribus"
- 10. "Pas n'importe quel toon"
- 11. "J'essaye, j'essaye"
- 12. "Promenade imprévue"
- 13. "Xavier"
- 14. "Wondercash"
- 15. "On est resté à l'hôtel"
- 16. "Si facile"
- 17. "Inachevés"
- 18. "Quand on descend vers le centre"

== 2017 ==
=== Orelsan – La fête est finie ===
- 01. "San"
- 02. "La fête est finie"
- 03. "Basique"
- 04. "Tout va bien" (co-produced with Stromae)
- 05. "Défaite de famille" (co-produced with Phazz)
- 06. "La lumière" (co-produced with Phazz)
- 08. "Quand est-ce que ça s'arrête ?" (co-produced with Guillaume Brière)
- 09. "Christophe" (co-produced with Phazz)
- 10. "Zone"
- 11. "Dans ma ville, on traîne" (co-produced with Phazz)
- 14. "Notes pour trop tard"

== 2018 ==
=== Orelsan – La fête est finie - Épilogue ===
- 02. "Tout ce que je sais"
- 03. "La famille, la famille"
- 05. "Tout va bien (Remix)" (co-produced with Stromae)
- 06. "Discipline"
- 09. "Dis-moi" (co-produced with Phazz)
- 10. "Rêves bizarres"
- 11. "Épilogue"
- 12. "San"
- 13. "La fête est finie"
- 14. "Basique"
- 15. "Tout va bien" (co-produced with Stromae)
- 16. "Défaite de famille" (co-produced with Phazz)
- 17. "La lumière" (co-produced with Phazz)
- 19. "Quand est-ce que ça s'arrête ?" (co-produced with Guillaume Brière)
- 20. "Christophe" (co-produced with Phazz)
- 21. "Zone"
- 22. "Dans ma ville, on traîne" (co-produced with Phazz)
- 25. "Notes pour trop tard"
