= Casseurs Flowters discography =

Hip hop rapper discography

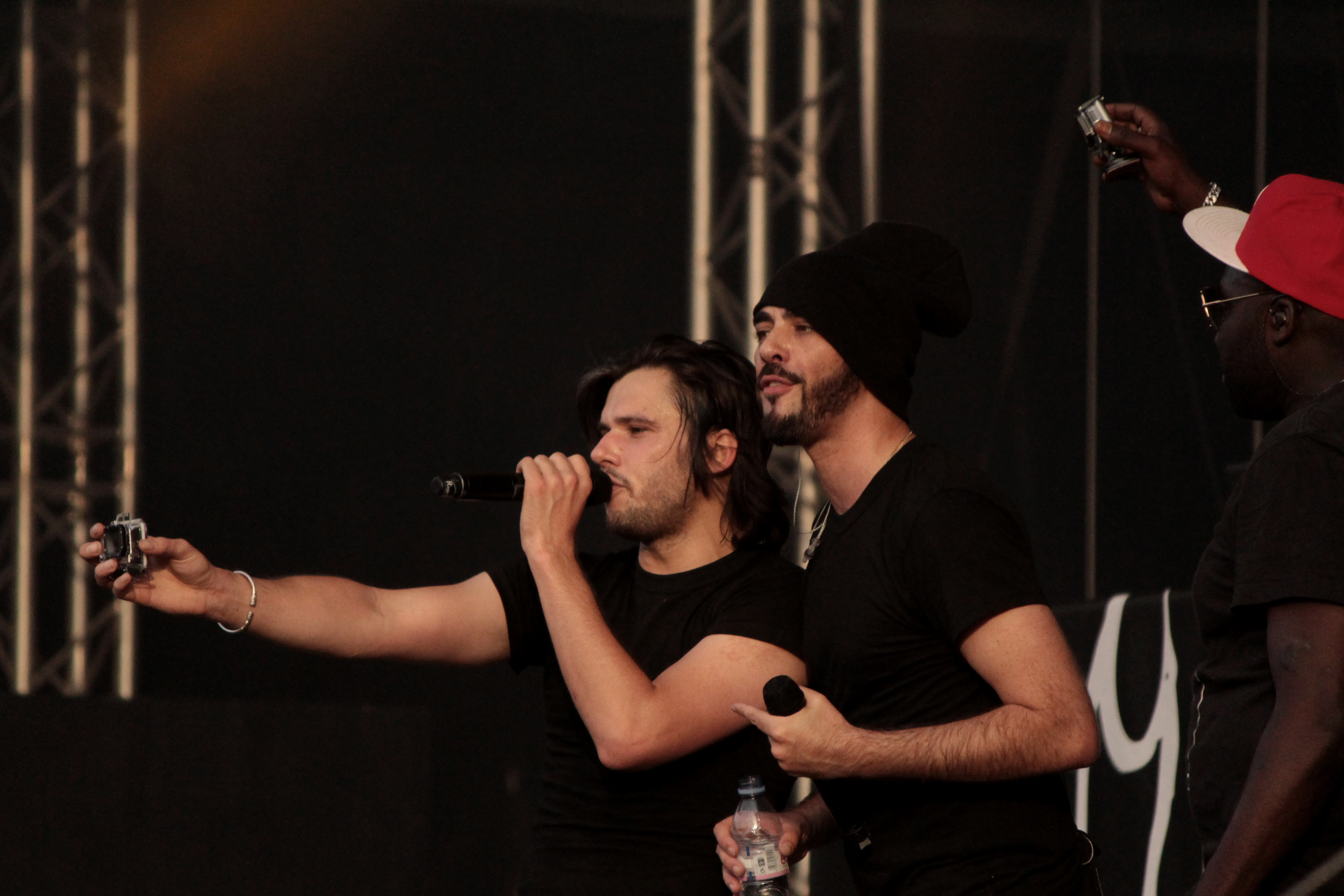
- Casseurs Flowters at the Festival des Vieilles Charrues in 2014
- Studio albums: 3
- Singles: 3
- Music videos: 8
- Mixtapes: 1

The following article outlines the discography of French hip hop duo Casseurs Flowters, consisting of rappers Orelsan and Gringe, which includes two studio albums, one mixtape and two singles.

Their debut studio album, Orelsan et Gringe sont les Casseurs Flowters, was released in 2013, with "Bloqué" as its lead single. In 2015, they released their second studio album, Comment c'est loin, which is also a soundtrack album for their film of the same name. Its lead single, "À l'heure où je me couche", was released a few weeks before the album's release.

== Albums ==
=== Studio albums ===
Title	Album details	Peak chart positions			Certifications (sales thresholds)
Title	Album details	BEL (WA)	FRA	SWI	Certifications (sales thresholds)
Orelsan et Gringe sont les Casseurs Flowters	Released: November 15, 2013; Format: Digital download, CD; Label: 7th Magnitude, Wagram Music	29	8	40	SNEP: Platinum
Comment c'est loin	Released: December 9, 2015; Format: Digital download, CD; Label: 3ème Bureau, 7th Magnitude, Wagram Music	61	24	83	SNEP: Platinum

=== Mixtapes ===
Title	Notes
Fantasy : Episode 1	Released: 2004; Format: Digital download

== Singles ==
=== As lead artist ===
Single	Year	Peak chart positions			Certifications (sales thresholds)	Album
Single	Year	BEL (WA)	FRA	SWI	Certifications (sales thresholds)	Album
"Bloqué"	2013	40	70	—	—N/a	Orelsan et Gringe sont les Casseurs Flowters
"À l'heure où je me couche"	2015	—	34	—	SNEP: Gold	Comment c'est loin

=== Other charted songs ===
Single	Year	Peak chart positions			Album
Single	Year	BEL (WA)	FRA	SWI	Album
"La mort du disque"	2013	—	57	—	Orelsan et Gringe sont les Casseurs Flowters
"Fais les backs"	2013	—	115	—	Orelsan et Gringe sont les Casseurs Flowters
"Dans la place pour être"	2013	43 (Note: "Dans la place pour être" did not enter the Ultratop 50, but peaked at number 43 on the Wallonian Ultratip chart.)	34	—	Orelsan et Gringe sont les Casseurs Flowters
"Regarde comme il fait beau (dehors)"	2013	3 (Note: "Regarde comme il fait beau (dehors)" did not enter the Ultratop 50, but peaked at number 3 on the Wallonian Ultratip chart.)	58	—	Orelsan et Gringe sont les Casseurs Flowters
"Inachevés"	2015	—	101	—	Comment c'est loin
"Si facile"	2015	—	174	—	Comment c'est loin

== Guest appearances ==
List of guest appearances, with other performing artists, showing year released and album name
Title	Year	Other artist(s)	Album
"C'est beau de rêver"	2012	Taipan, Orelsan, Gringe	Dans le circuit
"Mauvais plan"	2012	Canardo, Orelsan, Gringe	À la youv
"Keep Cool (remix)"	2013	Major Lazer, Wynter Gordon	—N/a
"Les portes du pénitencier"	2014	Shtar Academy, Bakar, Keny Arkana, Lino, Médine, Nor, Nekfeu, Nemir, REDK, Sat, Alonzo, Soprano, Tékila, Vincenzo	Shtar Academy

== Music videos ==
Year	Title	Director
2013	"Bloqué"	David Tomaszewski
2013	"La mort du disque"	Casseurs Flowters
2013	"Regarde comme il fait beau (dehors)"	Casseurs Flowters
2014	"Fais les backs"	David Tomaszewski
2014	"Change de pote"	Jiwee and Orelsan
2014	"Des histoires à raconter"	Greg&Lio
2015	"À l'heure où je me couche"	Christophe Offenstein
2016	"J'essaye, j'essaye"	Orelsan, Clément Cotentin
2016	"Quand ton père t'engueule"	Not available
2016	"Le mal est fait"	Not available

== See also ==
- Orelsan discography
