= À l'heure où je me couche =

Single by Casseurs Flowters

from the album Comment c'est loin: L'album du film
- Released: 29 October 2015
- Recorded: 2015
- Genre: French hip hop; pop-rap
- Length: 3:37; 3:40 (album version)
- Label: 3^{e} Bureau; 7th Magnitude; Wagram
- Songwriter(s): Aurélien Cotentin; Guillaume Tranchant
- Producer(s): Skread

Casseurs Flowters singles chronology
"Les portes du pénitencier" (2014)	"À l'heure où je me couche" (2015)

Orelsan singles chronology
"Les portes du pénitencier" (2014)	"À l'heure où je me couche" (2015)	"Basique" (2017)

Audio sample
- "À l'heure où je me couche": file; help

Music video
- "À l'heure où je me couche" on YouTube

"À l'heure où je me couche" is a song by French hip hop duo Casseurs Flowters and produced by Skread. It was released on 29 October 2015 as the first single from their second studio album Comment c'est loin, which also serves as the soundtrack for their 2015 film of the same name. The song entered the French Singles Chart on 31 October 2015 at number 126, peaking at number 34 and remaining on the chart for 14 weeks.

In the song, Orelsan sings that «l'avenir appartient à ceux qui se lèvent à l'heure où je me couche» ("the future belongs to those who wake up when I go to sleep"), which is a reference to the French proverb «L'avenir appartient à ceux qui se lèvent tôt» (roughly translated as "the early bird catches the worm"). The line suggests that he and Gringe have no futures, because they go to bed so late (at a time when one would usually be waking up).

== Music video ==
The music video for the song was released worldwide on 5 November 2015. It features shots of Orelsan and Gringe rapping to the words of the song blended with clips from the film Comment c'est loin through chroma keying.

== Track listing ==
- Digital download
1. "À l'heure où je me couche" – 3:37

== Chart performance ==
Chart (2015–16)	Peak position
France (SNEP)	34

== Certifications ==
Region	Certification	Certified units/sales
France (SNEP)	Gold	66,666^{‡}
^{‡} Sales+streaming figures based on certification alone.
