= Vizioz =

Vizioz is a French family name. It may refer to:

- Gautier Vizioz, French record producer, songwriter and musician
- Dean Henri Vizioz, co-founder of the University of Pau and Pays de l'Adour in France
- "Vizioz", a song from the album Orelsan et Gringe sont les Casseurs Flowters by French hip hop duo Casseurs Flowters
