= Yoroï =

2025 film by David Tomaszewski

- Official release poster
- Directed by: David Tomaszewski
- Written by: David Tomaszewski; Orelsan
- Produced by: Orelsan; Skread; Renan Artukmaç; Clément Cotentin; Julien Deris; David Gauquié
- Starring: Orelsan; Clara Choï; Skread; Ablaye; Gringe; Kazuya Tanabe; Alice Yanagida; Yôko Narahashi; Hiromi Komorita; Clément Cotentin
- Cinematography: Antoine Sanier
- Edited by: Florent Vassault
- Production company: Cinéfrance Studios
- Distributed by: Sony Pictures France
- Release date: 29 October 2025
- Running time: 106 minutes

Yoroï is a 2025 French action comedy-drama film directed by David Tomaszewski and co-written by Aurélien Cotentin (better known as Orelsan), released on 29 October 2025 in France by Sony Pictures France.

== Synopsis ==
After a grueling final tour, Aurélien (Orelsan), a French musician, decides to settle down in a secluded house in Japan with his wife, Nanako (Clara Choï), who is pregnant with their first child. As the young couple moves into a traditional house in the Japanese countryside, Aurélien discovers an ancient suit of armor in a well that awakens strange creatures—the Yōkai—which the couple must fight every night.

== Cast ==
- Orelsan as Aurélien
- Clara Choï as Nanako
- Skread as himself
- Ablaye as himself
- Gringe as himself
- Kazuya Tanabe as Nobi
- Alice Yanagida as Akiko
- Yôko Narahashi as Kyoto Takeda
- Hiromi Komorita as Fumiko Matsuda
- Clément Cotentin as himself (Aurélien's brother)

== Production ==
=== Development ===
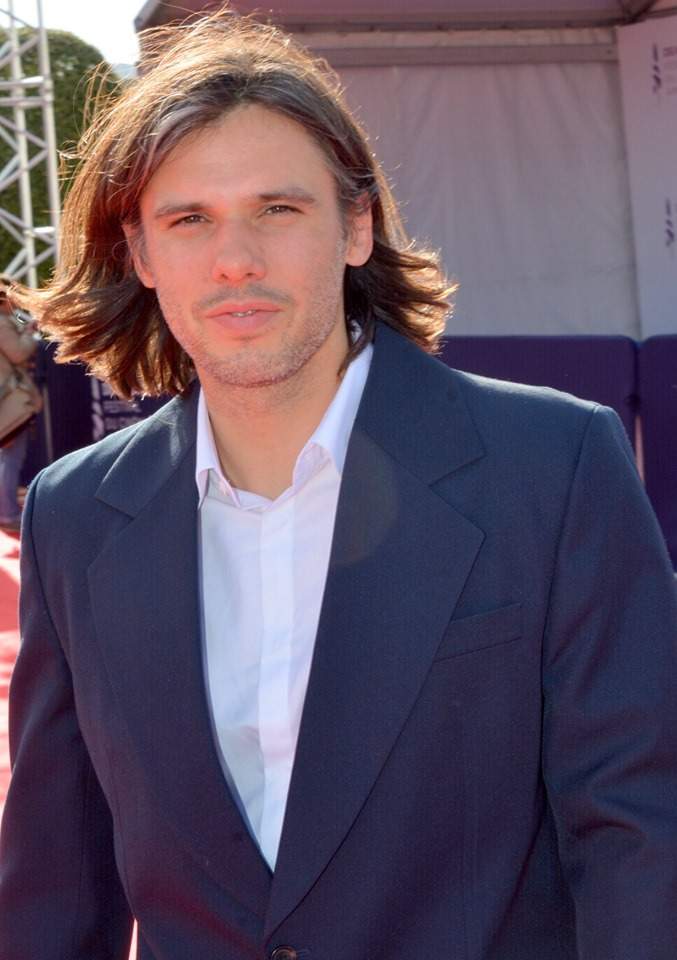
Orelsan starred in and co-wrote the film with David Tomaszewski.

Yoroï was directed by David Tomaszewski, a frequent collaborator of Orelsan and the director of the music video for Orelsan's 2021 song "L'odeur de l'essence". Orelsan describes the genre of the film as a "fantasy family adventure comedy".

The screenplay was co-written by Orelsan and Tomaszewski. The story blends "fiction and reality, exploring Orelsan's fears related to fatherhood", and features creatures from Japanese folktales. Orelsan said the screenplay writing process "was a pretty long but fun process—like a form of therapy."

The title of the film, Yoroï, originates from "Ō-yoroi", meaning "armor" in Japanese. The film was produced by David Gauquié and Julien Deris, for the production companies Cinéfrance Studios and Attita.

=== Casting ===
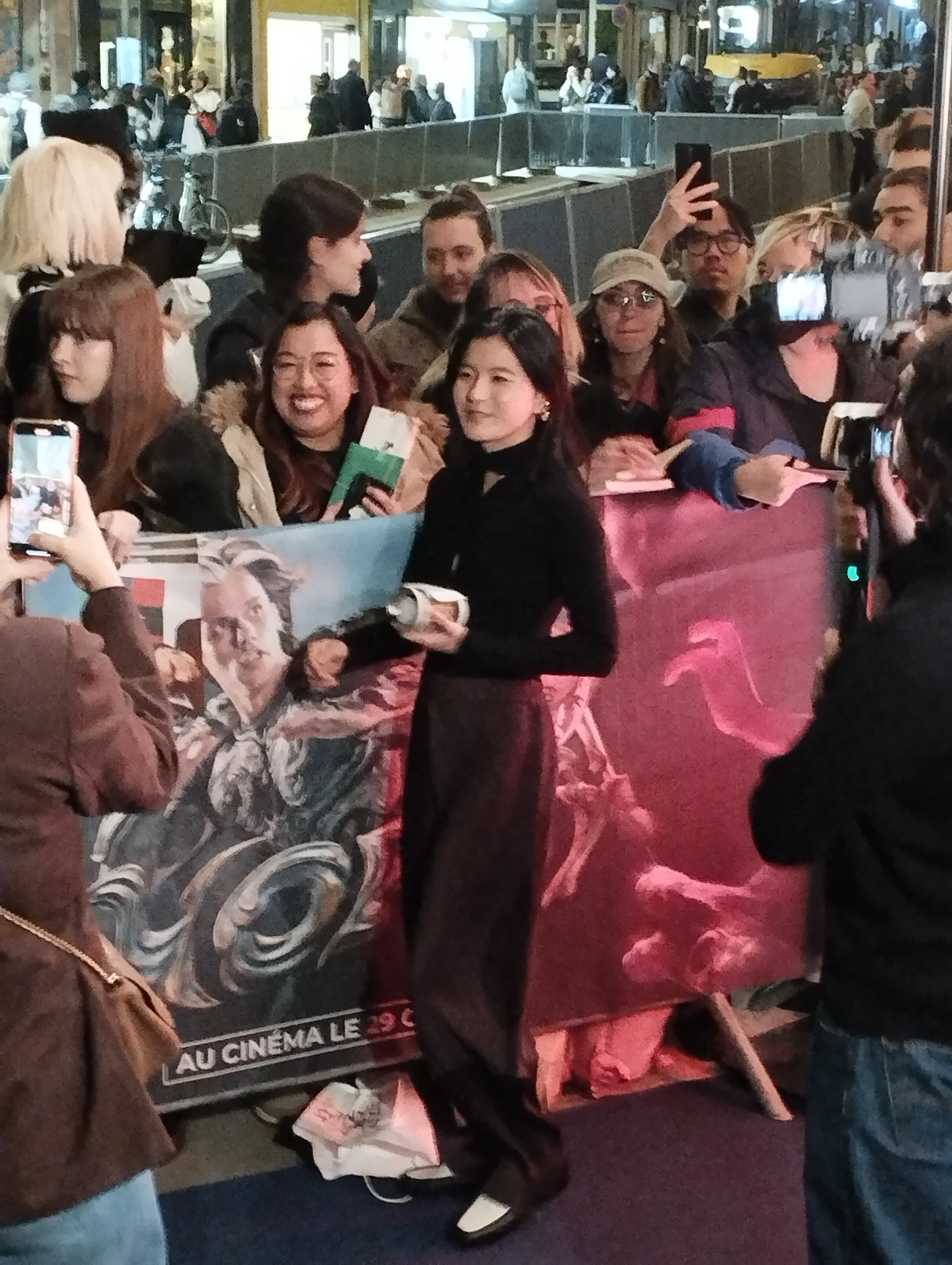
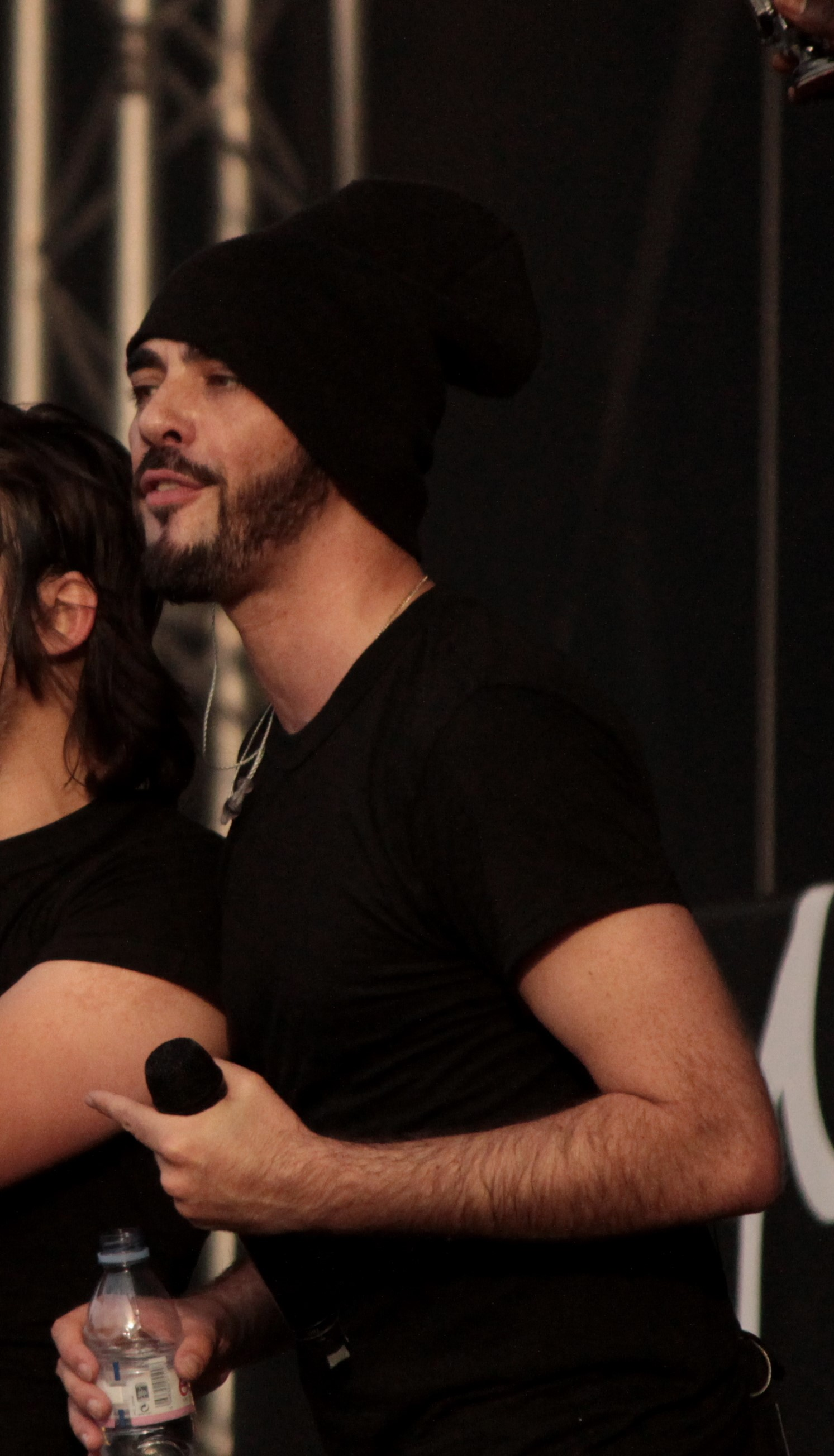
Clara Choï and Gringe also star in the film.

In early November 2024, actress Clara Choï was revealed to play Nanako, the wife of Aurélien, a role of which Orelsan plays himself. In mid-June 2025, musicians Skread, Ablaye, and Gringe were revealed as part of the film's cast.

=== Filming ===
Filming began in late March 2024, in Osaka, Japan, near Mount Fuji southwest of Tokyo, and then in France between May and July of that year, at Bry-sur-Marne Studios, as well as in Île-de-France, also known as the Paris region. Filming wrapped up in September 2024.

=== Music ===
The music for the film was composed by David Soltany, featuring Eddie Purple, Orelsan, Phazz, and Skread, and is partly performed by the London Symphony Orchestra.

== Release ==
Yoroï had its preview screening, which was attended by Orelsan, on the evening of 2 October 2025, at Pathé Cinemas in Caen, where the theater had "sold out in a matter of minutes" a month earlier. Another preview screening took place on the evening of 16 October that year, attended by Orelsan and Clara Choï, in the main auditorium of Le Grand Rex in Paris, ahead of its nationwide release on 29 October in France.

== Reception ==
=== Box office ===
Yoroï had grossed €1,094,100 (approximately $1,251,552) in France, garnered from 223,783 admissions.

=== Critical response ===
The website AlloCiné averaged the film at a rating of 3 out of 5 stars, based on reviews from 23 critics.

Catherine Balle, of the newspaper Le Parisien, states that the "metaphorical monster movie [is] very entertaining." On the other hand, Télérama claims that "Orelsan fails to engage in self-criticism in this fantastic work, which focuses more on his own ego and seems to be aimed primarily at his fans." France Culture describes the film as "at times clumsy, with some unnecessary scenes, but one that, in its simplicity, is nonetheless funny and self-deprecating."
