= Comment c'est loin =

- Theatrical release poster
- Directed by: Orelsan; Christophe Offenstein
- Screenplay by: Aurélien Cotentin; Christophe Offenstein; Stéphanie Murat
- Story by: Aurélien Cotentin
- Based on: Orelsan et Gringe sont les Casseurs Flowters by Casseurs Flowters
- Produced by: Maxime Delauney; Romain Rousseau
- Starring: Orelsan; Gringe; Seydou Doucouré; Claude Urbiztondo-Llarch; Ablaye; Skread
- Edited by: Jeanne Kef
- Music by: Skread; Alexis Rault; Orelsan
- Production companies: Nolita Cinéma; Les Canards Sauvages; Cinéfrance; Orange Studio; 7th Magnitude; Strong Ninja; Wagram Music; No Fear Prod
- Distributed by: La Belle Company
- Release dates: 10 October 2015 (FIF Saint-Jean-de-Luz); 9 December 2015 (France)
- Running time: 90 minutes
- Country: France
- Language: French
- Budget: $2.1 million
- Box office: $1 million

Comment c'est loin is a 2015 French quasi-autobiographical musical comedy-drama film written by French rapper Orelsan and directed by Orelsan and Christophe Offenstein. The film stars Orelsan and fellow French rapper Gringe, both of whom form the rap duo Casseurs Flowters, and is based on their debut studio album Orelsan et Gringe sont les Casseurs Flowters, which was released on 15 November 2013.

The film is set over a 24-hour period in the city of Caen, Normandy, and follows Aurélien, known as Orel (Orelsan, as he was formerly known), and Guillaume, known as Gringe (himself). They seek to finish recording their first song together at the request of their producers Skread (himself) and Ablaye (himself), but struggle to do so as they wander around the town with friends looking for quick ways to make money and a good time.

Comment c'est loin was premiered at the Saint-Jean-de-Luz International Film Festival on 10 October 2015, as well as being shown at the Sarlat Film Festival on 13 November 2015, before being released to the French public on 9 December 2015. The film has received mixed-to-positive reviews from critics, and grossed $1,001,196 in the domestic box office within its first three weeks.

== Synopsis ==
Orelsan and Gringe are in their mid-thirties and struggle to complete their first rap album. Their songs are mostly stories of sex and alcohol, reflecting their everyday lives in the city of Caen. They have never finished a song and when they meet with their producers, they are faced with a new challenge. Their old issues, the fear of failure, their alcoholic friends and girlfriends serve to stand in their way as they set out to finish their first song within the next 24 hours.

== Cast ==
- Orelsan as Aurélien "Orel" Cotentin (himself)
- Gringe as Guillaume "Gringe" Tranchant (himself)
- Seydou Doucouré as Bouteille
- Claude Urbiztondo-Llarch as Claude (himself)
- Ablaye as Abdoulaye "Ablaye" Doucouré (himself)
- Skread as Matthieu "Skread" Le Carpentier (himself)
- Sophie de Fürst as Pauline
- Chloé Astor as Arielle
- Redouanne Harjane as the fan
- Marc Brunet as Aurélien's father
- Jeannine Cotentin as Aurélien's grandmother (herself)
- Isabelle Alfred as Arielle's mother
- Alain Dion as Arielle's father
- France Hofnung as Marie
- Clément Cotentin as the local radio DJ
- Paul Minthe as the hotel manager
- Marine Forster Bourdin as the schools inspector

== Production ==
=== Filming ===
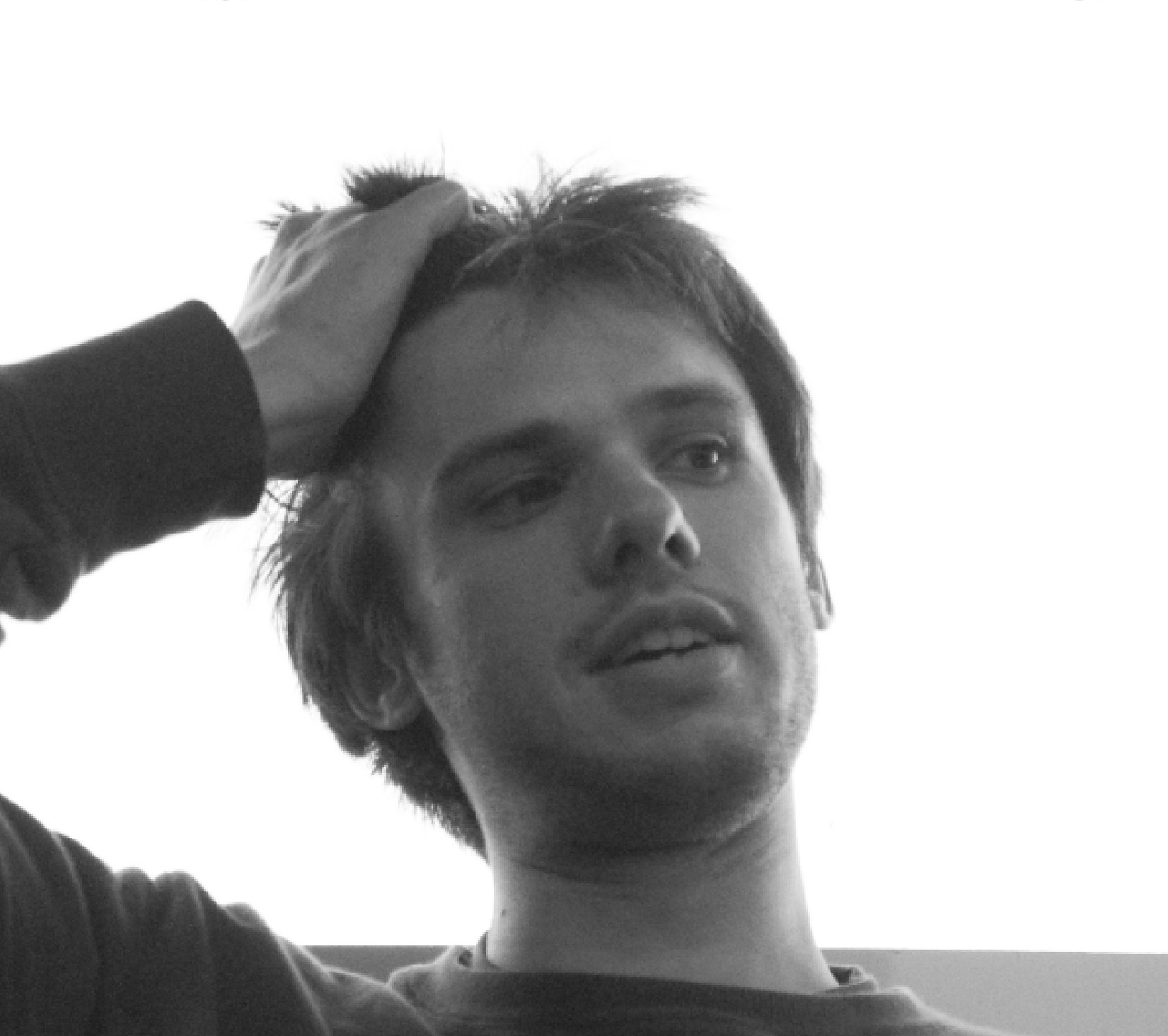
Orelsan, who made his directing debut with Comment c'est loin, confirmed the beginning of production on Instagram on 21 March 2015.

Comment c'est loin was filmed on location in the city of Caen, Lower Normandy, where Orelsan went to college and met record producer Skread, one of the film's other composers. Orelsan announced the beginning of production on his Instagram page on 21 March 2015, posting a picture of a copy of the film's script with the working title Orel et Gringe (Orel and Gringe). He posted another picture on 4 May, this time of himself next to Gringe, presumably during a certain scene in the film, announcing in the caption that filming was complete and confirming the film's title as Comment c'est loin.

=== Music ===
The musical score for the film was composed by Alexis Rault, while the soundtrack featured new songs from Casseurs Flowters and produced by Skread. The soundtrack album, which also acts as Casseurs Flowters' second studio album, was released in France along with the film on 9 December 2015. It peaked at number 24 on the French Albums Chart, at number 61 on the Belgian Ultratop Albums Chart (Wallonia) and at number 83 on the Swiss Hitparade Albums Chart. In April 2017, the album was certified platinum in France.
