= Shonen (song) =

Song by Orelsan

from the album Civilisation
- Released: 19 November 2021
- Genre: Hip hop
- Length: 2:33
- Label: 7th Magnitude; 3eme Bureau
- Songwriters: Aurélien Cotentin; Matthieu Le Carpentier
- Producer: Skread

"Shonen" is a song by French rapper and singer-songwriter Orelsan. The song peaked at number 4 on the French Singles Chart.

== Charts ==
Chart (2021)	Peak position
France (SNEP)	4

== Certifications ==
Region	Certification	Certified units/sales
France (SNEP)	Gold	100,000^{‡}
^{‡} Sales+streaming figures based on certification alone.
