= Évidemment =

Évidemment may refer to:

- "Évidemment" (France Gall song), 1988
- "Évidemment" (La Zarra song), 2023
- "Évidemment", a song by Orelsan and Angèle, 2022
- Évidemment, an album by France Gall, 2004
