= La mort du disque =

Song by Casseurs Flowters

from the album Orelsan et Gringe sont les Casseurs Flowters
- Released: 16 November 2013
- Recorded: 2013
- Genre: French hip hop, comedy hip hop, hardcore hip hop
- Length: 2:42
- Label: 7th Magnitude, Wagram
- Songwriter(s): Aurélien Cotentin, Guillaume Tranchant
- Producer(s): Orelsan

Casseurs Flowters chronology
Bloqué (2013)	La mort du disque (2013)	Fais les backs (2013)

Audio sample
- "La mort du disque": file; help

Music video
- "La mort du disque" on YouTube

"La mort du disque" is a song by French hip hop duo Casseurs Flowters and produced by Orelsan. It is the 8th track from their debut studio album, Orelsan et Gringe sont les Casseurs Flowters, where its title is "19h26 – La mort du disque". Although it hasn't been officially released as a single, the song entered the French Singles Chart at number 57 on 16 November 2013, and has since peaked at that same position.

== Music video ==
The music video was released on November 4, 2013, and follows Casseurs Flowters members Orelsan and Gringe as they go about their day destroying numerous CDs in different ways using a variety of tools, from their own bodies to conventional tools such as drills and steel cut off saws, to unorthodox tools such as guitars and toasters, as they think the music was so bad they needed to destroy them.

== Track listing ==
- Digital download
1. "19h26 – La mort du disque" – 2:42

== Chart performance ==
Chart (2013)	Peak position
France (SNEP)	57
