= Fais les backs =

Song by Casseurs Flowters

from the album Orelsan et Gringe sont les Casseurs Flowters
- Released: 16 November 2013
- Recorded: 2013
- Genre: French hip hop, alternative hip hop
- Length: 3:03
- Label: 7th Magnitude, Wagram
- Songwriter(s): Aurélien Cotentin, Guillaume Tranchant
- Producer(s): Skread, DJ Pone (scratching)

Casseurs Flowters chronology
La mort du disque (2013)	Fais les backs (2013)	Dans la place pour être (2013)

Audio sample
- "Fais les backs": file; help

Music video
- "Fais les backs" on YouTube

"Fais les backs" is a song by French hip hop duo Casseurs Flowters and produced by Skread. It is the 11th track from their debut studio album, Orelsan et Gringe sont les Casseurs Flowters, where its title is "22h31 – Fais les backs". The song entered the French Singles Chart at number 115 on 16 November 2013, and has since peaked at that same position, despite not being officially released as a single.

In an interview with Booska-P, Orelsan explained that "les backs" (the backs) in the title refer to the words that background singers or rappers repeat at the end of a line in a song. He also explained that the title "Fais les backs" is a reflection of his and his friends' way of life, stating that "we have the same life."

== Music video ==
The music video for "Fais les backs" was released on March 24, 2014. Throughout most of the video, parts of the song's lyrics pop up as Orelsan and Gringe rap them, while making robot-like body movements. The video also features the two rappers dancing in 3D cardboard cut-outs of themselves, as well as 3D cardboard cut-outs of robotic versions of themselves. Towards the end of the video, the two rappers' heads are set on fire, and by the end of the video their entire bodies are burning as they continue rapping and dancing, after which they are seen dropping to the ground to be put off using fire extinguishers by members of the camera crew. There's then a polish voice saying it was bad, before asking to do it again.

== Track listing ==
- Digital download
1. "22h31 – Fais les backs" – 2:42

== Chart performance ==
Chart (2013)	Peak position
France (SNEP)	115
