= La fuite en avant =

Studio album by Orelsan
- Released: 7 November 2025
- Length: 58:08
- Label: Sony; 7th Magnitude; Strong Ninja
- Producer: Phazz; Skread; Thomas Bangalter; Eddie Purple

Orelsan chronology
Civilisation (2021)	La fuite en avant (2025)

Singles from La fuite en avant
- 1. "Ailleurs" Released: 10 November 2025

La fuite en avant is the fifth studio album by French rapper Orelsan, released on 7 November 2025 by Sony Music, 7th Magnitude, and Strong Ninja. It is also Orelsan's first album released under Sony Music.

The album is partially inspired by the 2025 film Yoroï, which starred and was co-written by Orelsan, and directed and co-written by David Tomaszewski, who is also the director of several of Orelsan's music videos, notably those from the album Le chant des sirènes.

== Background and release ==
On 27 October 2025, Orelsan released a video in which he announced the release of La fuite en avant, alongside the announcement of the release of Yoroï. The album features various artists such as Lilas, Yamê, Fifty Fifty, SDM, and Thomas Bangalter. In December 2025, La fuite en avant had been certified platinum by the SNEP with 114,445 copies sold.

== Track listing ==
La fuite en avant track listing
No.	Title	Lyrics	Producer(s)	Length
1.	"Le pacte"	Orelsan	Phazz	4:28
2.	"Plus rien" (featuring Lilas)	Orelsan; Lilas	Skread	3:29
3.	"Ailleurs"	Orelsan	Skread	3:12
4.	"Boss"	Orelsan	Phazz; Eddie Purple; Skread	3:09
5.	"Deux et demi"	Orelsan	Phazz; Eddie Purple; Skread	3:48
6.	"Osaka"	Orelsan	Phazz	3:11
7.	"Encore une fois" (featuring Yamê)	Orelsan; Yamê	Phazz; Skread	3:01
8.	"Internet"	Orelsan	Phazz	1:41
9.	"Dans quelques mois"	Orelsan	Phazz	3:28
10.	"Oulalalala" (featuring Fifty Fifty)	Orelsan; Fifty Fifty	Phazz; Skread	2:42
11.	"Tellement d'amis"	Orelsan	Skread	3:48
12.	"La petite voix"	Orelsan	Phazz; Skread	4:02
13.	"Sama"	Orelsan	Phazz; Skread	3:43
14.	"Soleil levant" (featuring SDM)	Orelsan; SDM	Skread	3:24
15.	"Les monstres"	Orelsan	Phazz; Skread	3:11
16.	"Épiphanie"	Orelsan	Skread	4:27
17.	"Yoroï" (featuring Thomas Bangalter)	Orelsan	Phazz; Skread; Orelsan; Thomas Bangalter	3:18
Total length:				58:08

== Charts ==
Chart performance for La fuite en avant
Chart (2025)	Peak position
Belgian Albums (Ultratop Flanders)	93
Belgian Albums (Ultratop Wallonia)	1
French Albums (SNEP)	1
Swiss Albums (Schweizer Hitparade)	2

== Certifications ==
Certifications for La fuite en avant
Region	Certification	Certified units/sales
France (SNEP)	Platinum	100,000^{‡}
^{‡} Sales+streaming figures based on certification alone.
