= Regarde comme il fait beau (dehors) =

Song by Casseurs Flowters

from the album Orelsan et Gringe sont les Casseurs Flowters
- Released: 30 November 2013
- Recorded: 2013
- Genre: French hip hop, alternative hip hop, comedy hip hop, bubblegum pop
- Length: 3:24
- Label: 7th Magnitude, Wagram
- Songwriter(s): Aurélien Cotentin, Guillaume Tranchant
- Producer(s): Fred Savio, Skread

Casseurs Flowters chronology
Dans la place pour être (2013)	Regarde comme il fait beau (dehors) (2013)

Audio sample
- "Regarde comme il fait beau (dehors)": file; help

"Regarde comme il fait beau (dehors)" is a song by French hip hop duo Casseurs Flowters and produced by Skread. It is the second track from their debut studio album, Orelsan et Gringe sont les Casseurs Flowters, where its title is "15h02 – Regarde comme il fait beau (dehors)". The song has not been officially released as a single, but nevertheless entered the French Singles Chart at number 136 on 30 November 2013, and has since peaked at number 58. The song also features uncredited vocals from French rock artist Izïa.

== Music video ==
The music video was released on December 20, 2013. At the beginning of the video, Orelsan receives a Skype call from Ablaye, who is asking about the progress of a music video he had asked for. Orelsan assures him that it is almost ready, and after the call, Orelsan and Gringe take turns recording themselves using a camera in their apartment, as they rap the song and perform activities in line with the song's lyrics. At the same time, Izïa can be seen singing and acting in a fictional children's television series on several screens around the apartment. At the end, the video is rewound to the beginning and a blueprint of the video's direction is revealed on-screen, as Orelsan is heard saying, "Alors, on a trois minutes, un appartement rempli de bordel...euhm...bon, non c'est compliqué..." ("So, we have three minutes, an apartment full of stuff everywhere...um...actually it's complicated...").

A making-of of the music video was released on 7 January 2014.

== Track listing ==
- Digital download
1. "15h02 – Regarde comme il fait beau (dehors)" – 3:24

== Chart performance ==
Chart (2013)	Peak position
Belgium (Ultratip Wallonia)	3
France (SNEP)	58
