= Dans la place pour être =

Song by Casseurs Flowters

from the album Orelsan et Gringe sont les Casseurs Flowters
- Released: 23 November 2013
- Recorded: 2013
- Genre: French hip hop, alternative hip hop
- Length: 3:25
- Label: 7th Magnitude, Wagram
- Songwriter(s): Aurélien Cotentin, Guillaume Tranchant
- Producer(s): Skread

Casseurs Flowters chronology
Fais les backs (2013)	Dans la place pour être (2013)	Regarde comme il fait beau (dehors) (2013)

Audio sample
- "Dans la place pour être": file; help

"Dans la place pour être" is a song by French hip hop duo Casseurs Flowters and produced by Skread. It is the 9th track from their debut studio album, Orelsan et Gringe sont les Casseurs Flowters, where its title is "20h08 – Dans la place pour être". Despite not being officially released as a single, the song entered the French Singles Chart at number 34 on 23 November 2013, and has since peaked at that same position.

== Track listing ==
- Digital download
1. "20h08 – Dans la place pour être" – 3:25

== Chart performance ==
Chart (2013)	Peak position
Belgium (Ultratip Wallonia)	43
France (SNEP)	34
