= Basique (song) =

2017 single by Orelsan

Single by Orelsan

from the album La fête est finie
- Released: 21 September 2017
- Genre: French rap
- Songwriters: Orelsan; Skread
- Producer: Skread

"Basique" is a song by French hip hop artist Orelsan released in September 2017. The song has peaked at number 9 on the French Singles Chart.

== Charts ==
Chart (2017)	Peak position
Belgium (Ultratop 50 Wallonia)	10
France (SNEP)	9
Switzerland (Schweizer Hitparade)	69

== Certifications ==
Region	Certification	Certified units/sales
France (SNEP)	Diamond	333,333^{‡}
^{‡} Sales+streaming figures based on certification alone.
