= Salif (rapper) =

French rapper (born 1982)

- Also known as: Black Skin, Cash, Baracash, Fon
- Born: Salif Fofana; 1982 (age 43–44)
- Origin: Boulogne-Billancourt, France
- Genres: Hip hop
- Years active: 1995–present
- Label: Universal (France)

Salif Fofana better known by the mononym Salif (born Salif Wonka in 1982), is a French rapper based in Boulogne-Billancourt of Malian and Guadeloupean origin. His musical career began at the age of thirteen when he and EXS formed the rap duo Nysay in 1995. Salif released his first solo album, Tous Ensemble – Chacun Pour Soi, in 2001. To date he has released four studio albums, all of which have entered the Top 75 of the French albums chart. His most commercially successful album so far was Curriculum Vital, which reached a peak position of #9 in the French chart in October 2009.

== Discography ==
=== Albums ===
Year	Album	Peak positions
Year	Album	FR
2001	Tous ensemble - Chacun pour soi	23
2007	Boulogne Boy	55
2008	Prolongations	73
2009	Curriculum vital	9
2010	Qui m'aime me suive	9

=== Singles ===
- 2009: "Boomerang"
- 2010: "Jean Slim"
