= Bloqué =

Single by Casseurs Flowters

from the album Orelsan et Gringe sont les Casseurs Flowters
- Released: 3 July 2013
- Recorded: 2013
- Genre: French hip hop; comedy hip hop; electro-hop
- Length: 3:24; 3:49 (album version)
- Label: 7th Magnitude; Wagram
- Songwriter(s): Aurélien Cotentin; Guillaume Tranchant
- Producer(s): Skread

Casseurs Flowters singles chronology
"Ils sont cools" (2012)	"Bloqué" (2013)	"Les portes du pénitencier" (2014)

Music video
- "Bloqué" on YouTube

Audio sample
- file; help

"Bloqué" is a song by French hip hop duo Casseurs Flowters, and produced by Skread. It was released on July 3, 2013 as the lead single from their debut studio album Orelsan et Gringe sont les Casseurs Flowters, in which the song's title is "18h30 – Bloqué".

Following the story of the album, the song is about the two rappers failing to find a theme for their album, thus experiencing writer's block, hence the refrain "J'ai tendance à bloquer", which is French for "I tend to block".

== Music video ==
The music video was released as part of the single's release on July 3, 2013. It depicts Casseurs Flowters members Orelsan and Gringe spending their day doing various activities in line with the lyrics of the song. The video begins at an apartment where the two rappers are watching television, and ends with Orelsan passing out at the beach the next day after leaving a rave with Gringe.

== Track listing ==
- Digital download
1. "Bloqué" – 3:24

== Chart performance ==
Chart (2013)	Peak position
Belgium (Ultratip 50 Wallonia)	40
France (SNEP)	70
