= Orelsan et Gringe sont les Casseurs Flowters =

Studio album by Casseurs Flowters
- Released: 15 November 2013
- Recorded: December 2012–October 2013
- Genre: French hip hop; alternative hip hop; comedy hip hop
- Length: 66:38
- Language: French
- Label: 7th Magnitude; Wagram
- Producer: Ablaye (exec.); Edouard Ardan; Didaï; DJ Pone; Orelsan; Fred Savio; Skread (exec.); Vizioz

Casseurs Flowters chronology
Fantasy : Episode 1 (2004)	Orelsan et Gringe sont les Casseurs Flowters (2013)	Comment c'est loin (2015)

Orelsan chronology
Le chant des sirènes (2011)	Orelsan et Gringe sont les Casseurs Flowters (2013)	Comment c'est loin (2015)

Singles from Orelsan et Gringe sont les Casseurs Flowters
- 1. "Bloqué" Released: July 3, 2013

Orelsan et Gringe sont les Casseurs Flowters is the debut studio album by Casseurs Flowters, a French hip hop duo consisting of rappers Orelsan and Gringe. It was released on 15 November 2013 by 7th Magnitude and Wagram Music in France and on 18 November 2013 on iTunes.

Entering the French Albums Chart at number 8 in its first week, the album received generally positive reviews from music critics, and has sold more than 100,000 copies in France to date.

== Background ==
After the release of their first mixtape Fantasy : Episode 1 in 2004, Gringe and Orelsan embarked on solo careers before coming together again to record their debut studio album. Gringe released Fantasy Mixtape in 2009, while Orelsan's two studio albums Perdu d'avance and Le chant des sirènes were met with huge success. The former was nominated for a Prix Constantin, while the latter won him the Urban Music Album of the Year award at the 2012 Victoires de la Musique, with songs from the album and Orelsan himself garnering several more accolades and nominations in the process. The two rappers had done the songs "Entre bien et mal" from Perdu d'avance and "Ils sont cools" from Le chant des sirènes, as well as being featured on "C'est beau de rêver" by Taipan from his album Dans le circuit among others before collectively working on their new studio album and releasing tracks as Casseurs Flowters.

== Composition ==
Despite the success of his first two studio albums, Orelsan kept his feet on the ground and never forgot, according to Les Inrocks, the "pact he signed" with his accomplice Gringe. In an interview, Orelsan explains: "In the beginning, we didn't really know what [songwriting] would give, we wrote. [...] and then we told ourselves that we had to find an idea to structure the thing." Waking up at 3:00 in the afternoon to write and spending the night going out before getting back home to sleep at 6:00 in the morning became their daily routine.

[Orelsan] What interested us, was managing to write in this immobilism, on these days where we did nothing but where in the end there was a lot going on. These days where we had thousands of pointless discussions which created something. [...] [Gringe] I remember days when I never saw daylight. In Caen, I spent a lot of time at Orel's, he hosted me like many other friends, we went out a lot and when I woke up it was already almost dark and kids started coming home from school.

— Orelsan and Gringe, in an interview with Les Inrocks.

This kind of life the two rappers found themselves living became the subject of the album, whose story is told like a film in its totality. They explain that they chose to explore nightclubs for concerts in the company of some friends. Orelsan explains: "We do a bit of anything, we dance in the crowd, which smells like Red Bull and old whiskey and coke. We enjoy ourselves, we take pleasure and later we'll see."

== Singles ==
Orelsan et Gringe sont les Casseurs Flowters has produced 1 single:

- "Bloqué" was released as the album's lead single on 3 July 2013. It peaked at number 70 on the French Singles Chart, and number 40 on the Belgian Ultratip 50 chart in Wallonia.

== Reception ==
=== Critical reception ===
Professional ratings
Review scores
Source	Rating
Fnac	5/5 stars
Goûte mes disques	5/10
Music Story	3/5 stars
Republ33k.fr	4/5 stars
Un jour, une critique ou pas	7/10
2K Music	4/5 stars

Orelsan et Gringe sont les Casseurs Flowters received generally positive reviews from music critics. According to Un jour, une critique ou pas, the Casseurs Flowters "bring a certain freshness that was missing in current hip hop". Republ33k.fr called it "a refreshing concept album whose originality is matched by its quality." They continue: "Gringe and Orel continue their journey with songs with huge potential and which will surely liven up your upcoming events, showing us that they are just as good as a group as they are solo." Pierre Siankowski of Les Inrocks gave the album a positive review, saying: "It's this type of life, where nobody tries to fight the gluten, which is narrated with impressive dexterity by the Casseurs Flowters album. [...] A good listen gives the disc resemblance to 90s albums filled with interludes." Franckie Small of BasketsBlanches showered the album with praise: "The project is fresh, funny, geeky, hip hop, musical and well scripted. OrelSan and Gringe have succeeded in surprising me. I was expecting something original but they went beyond my expectations. [...] Thou shalt understand, Orelsan et Gringe sont les Casseurs Flowters is an album you should buy yourself at all costs."

"Deux connards dans un abribus"
Produced by Vizioz, the album's fifth track "Deux connards dans un abribus" was described as "100% rap" by Higher Magazine.

On the other hand, Goûte mes disques gave the album a mixed review, saying the skits are "not very badly played, even though improvised". They go on to say that in the course of the album, one "can understand the desire to self-parody, to admit a tendency to talk about the same thing from the beginning, and then one perceives a confession of hopelessness." Higher Magazine generally criticised the album, saying: "In general Orelsan et Gringe sont les Casseurs Flowters is an average album and a bit repetitive on the edges. There are no real surprises or slaps similar to the single "Ils sont cools", which left us in suspense while waiting for the first album of the young duo. Apart from some pretty good songs, the rest is a little too mundane; one gets the impression that the Casseurs Flowters are short of inspiration." They continue to say that the album is "a bit too comic on a cartoon level, and this kills a bit of their artistic personality, which above all must be taken seriously. Basically, we have a half good songs and a half bad ones."

=== Commercial performance ===
The album entered the French Albums Chart in 8th place on 30 November 2013, and was certified gold in 2014 and platinum in 2018 by the SNEP, having sold more than 100,000 copies in France.

== Track listing ==
All lyrics are written by Aurélien Cotentin and Guillaume Tranchant.

No.	Title	Music	Producer(s)	Length
1.	"14h58 - Casseurs Flowters Opening"	Edouard Ardan	Edouard Ardan	1:43
2.	"15h02 - Regarde comme il fait beau (dehors)"	Frédéric Savio; Matthieu Le Carpentier	Fred Savio; Skread	3:24
3.	"15h45 - Stupide ¡ Stupide ¡ Stupide ¡"	Le Carpentier	Skread	4:16
4.	"16h00 - Tu m'dois d'l'oseille"	Le Carpentier	Skread	2:17
5.	"16h22 - Deux connards dans un abribus"	Gautier Vizioz	Vizioz	4:34
6.	"17h04 - Prends des pièces"	Ardan	Skread	3:43
7.	"18h30 - Bloqué"	Le Carpentier	Skread	3:49
8.	"19h26 - La mort du disque"	Aurélien Cotentin	Orelsan	2:42
9.	"20h08 - Dans la place pour être"	Matthieu Le Carpentier	Skread	3:25
10.	"20h13 - La nouvelle paire"	Thomas Parent; Didaï Desirre	DJ Pone; Didaï	5:28
11.	"22h31 - Fais les backs"	Le Carpentier	Skread	3:03
12.	"01h14 - Couplet de Claude (Interlude)"	–	–	2:08
13.	"01h16 - Les putes et moi"	Vizioz; Le Carpentier	Vizioz; Skread	6:19
14.	"01h25 - Johnny Galoche"	Le Carpentier	Skread	1:56
15.	"01h47 - Change de pote"	Le Carpentier; Ardan	Skread	3:10
16.	"03h53 - Manger c'est tricher"	Cotentin	Orelsan	4:24
17.	"04h41 - Greenje et Orselane"	Le Carpentier	Skread	3:33
18.	"06h16 - Des histoires à raconter"	Le Carpentier	Skread	4:40
Total length:				66:38

iTunes bonus track
No.	Title	Music	Producer(s)	Length
19.	"Vizioz"	Vizioz	Vizioz	3:34

"Couplet de Claude (Interlude)"
"Couplet de Claude (Interlude)" is a skit in which Claude, a friend of the two rappers, demonstrates his verse for the album, which is performed in a similar fashion to the chorus of "Bloqué".

Notes

- "14h58 – Casseurs Flowters Opening" features vocals by Mote Aoki.
- "15h02 - Regarde comme il fait beau (dehors)" features vocals by Izïa.
- "16h00 - Tu m'dois d'l'oseille" is performed by Ablaye.
- "01h14 - Couplet de Claude (Interlude)" features vocals by Claude Urbiztondo-Llarch.
- "01h16 - Les putes et moi" features vocals by Julie-Marie Petit.
- "01h25 - Johnny Galoche" features vocals by Julie-Marie Petit.
- "01h47 - Change de Pote" features vocals by Izïa and Mai Lan.

Sample credits

- "03h53 - Manger c'est tricher" contains samples of "Anxiety Montage (1952–1955)", composed and performed by Carl Stalling.

== Personnel ==
Credits for Orelsan et Gringe sont les Casseurs Flowters adapted from Discogs.

- Ablaye – Executive producer, featured artist
- Mote Aoki – Vocals
- Edouard Ardan – Guitar, producer
- Jean-Pierre Chalbos – Mastering
- Clément Cotentin – Vocals
- Frédéric Curier – Mixing
- Didaï – Producer
- DJ Pone – Producer, scratching
- Seydou Doukouré – Vocals
- Vincent Forgue – Mixing
- Gringe – Primary artist
- Redouanne Harjane – Vocals
- Izïa – Vocals, chorus
- Mai Lan – Vocals, chorus
- Martin Lanot – Engineer
- Guillaume Le Grontec – Director of photography
- Orelsan – Producer, primary artist
- Julie-Marie Petit – Vocals
- Alexandre Poirier – Sound designer
- Raf – Illustration
- Fred Savio – Producer
- Skread – Executive producer
- David Soudan – Mixing
- David Tomaszewski – Artwork, illustration
- Claude Urbiztondo-Llarch – Vocals
- Vizioz – Producer

== Charts ==
=== Weekly charts ===
Chart (2013–2014)	Peak position
Belgian Albums (Ultratop Wallonia)	29
French Albums (SNEP)	8
Swiss Albums (Schweizer Hitparade)	40

=== Year-end charts ===
Chart (2013)	Position
French Albums (SNEP)	147

Chart (2014)	Position
Belgian Albums (Ultratop Wallonia)	182
French Albums (SNEP)	155

== Certifications ==
Region	Certification	Certified units/sales
France (SNEP)	Platinum	100,000^{‡}
^{‡} Sales+streaming figures based on certification alone.
