= Gringe =

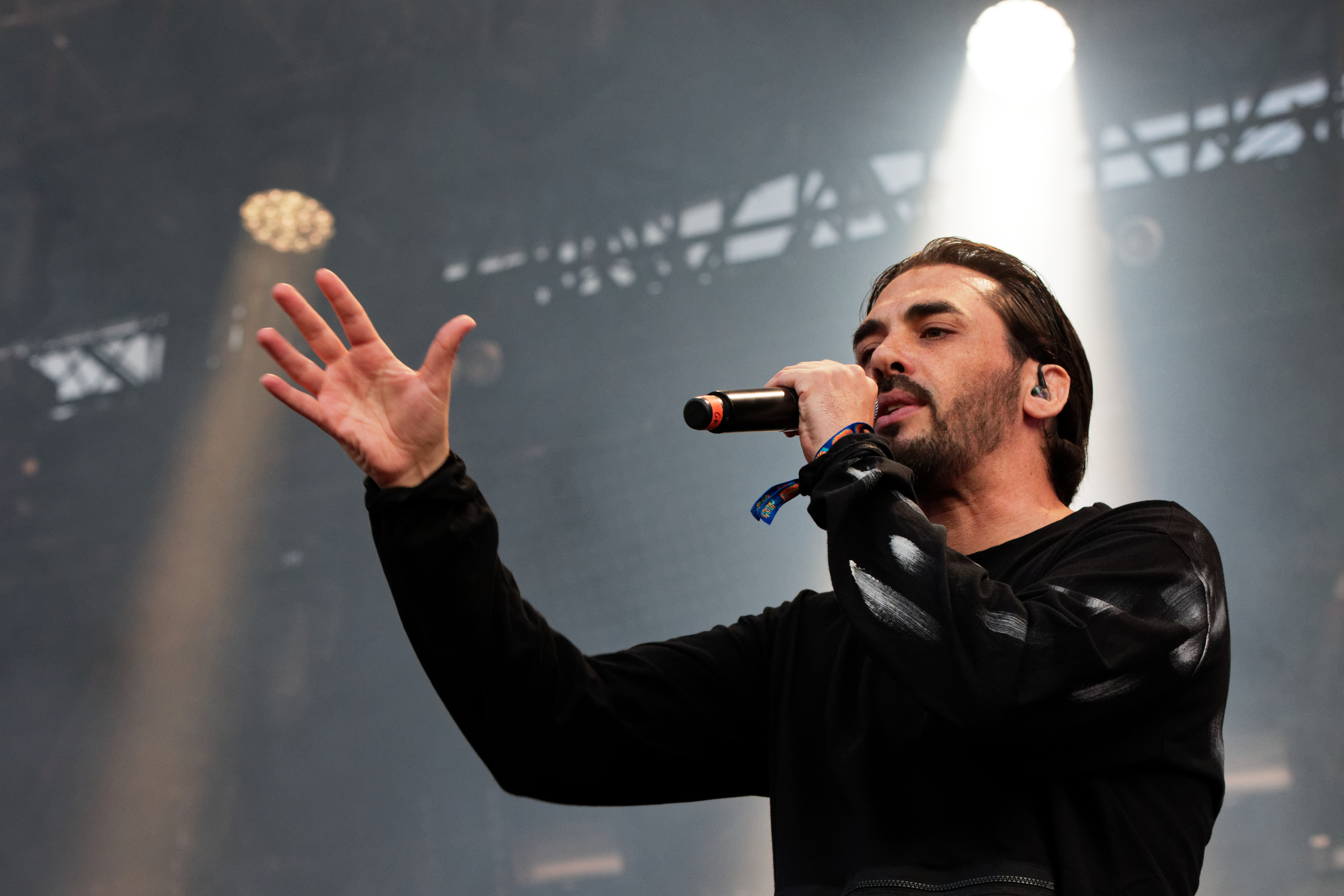
- Gringe at the Festival des Vieilles Charrues in 2019

Background information
- Birth name: Guillaume Tranchant
- Also known as: Gringo; Greenje
- Born: 20 February 1980 (age 45)
- Origin: Cergy, Val-d'Oise, France
- Genres: French hip hop
- Occupations: Rapper; songwriter
- Instrument: Vocals
- Years active: 2004–present
- Labels: 7th Magnitude; Wagram Music
- Member of: Casseurs Flowters
- Website: https://difymusic.com/gringe

Guillaume Tranchant (French pronunciation: [ɡijom tʁɑ̃ʃɑ̃]; born 20 February 1980), better known by his stage name Gringe ([ɡʁɛ̃ʒ]), is a French rapper and songwriter. He is one half of the French hip hop duo Casseurs Flowters, along with Orelsan, with whom he has released two studio albums: Orelsan et Gringe sont les Casseurs Flowters in 2013 and the original soundtrack for their 2015 film Comment c'est loin.

== Career ==
In 2004, Gringe formed the hip hop duo Casseurs Flowters with his colleague Orelsan, and with help from French record producer Skread, they released their first mixtape Fantasy: Episode -1 in 2004 with 11 tracks. Afterwards, the two decided to focus on building their solo careers; Gringe collaborated with a number of artists including El Matador, Brasco, Pit Baccardi, La Province, Jamal and Nubi, while he also appeared on the song "Ils sont cools", from Orelsan's second studio album Le chant des sirènes, which peaked at number 66 on the French (SNEP) Singles Chart.

On 3 July 2013, Gringe released his first collaborative single as Casseurs Flowters with Orelsan, "Bloqué", as a pre-release for their upcoming debut studio album, Orelsan et Gringe sont les Casseurs Flowters, which was released on 15 November 2013 to generally positive reviews. On 9 December 2015, Orelsan and Gringe released their second collective studio album Comment c'est loin, which also served as the soundtrack for their comedy film of the same name, peaking at number 24 on the French Albums Chart and earning a platinum certification in France 13 months later.

In April 2017, Gringe announced that he was working on his debut solo album, but did not provide any exact date for its release.

On 3 November 2018, Gringe released his first solo album Enfant lune.

On 19 September 2024, Gringe released his second solo album Hypersensible.

== Discography ==
Refer also to Casseurs Flowters discography

Solo

=== Albums ===
Year	Album	Peak positions			Certification
Year	Album	FRA	BEL (Wa)	SWI	Certification
As Casseurs Flowters
2013	Orelsan et Gringe sont les Casseurs Flowters	8	29	40	SNEP: Platinum
2015	Comment c'est loin (Soundtrack)	1	1	2	SNEP: Platinum
Solo
2018	Enfant lune	5	13	35	SNEP: Gold
2024	Hypersensible	8	27	—	

=== Singles ===
Year	Album	Peak positions		Certification
Year	Album	FRA	BEL (Wa)	Certification
As Casseurs Flowters
2013	"La mort du disque"	57	—	Orelsan et Gringe sont les Casseurs Flowters
2015	"À l'heure où je me couche"	34	—	Comment c'est loin

=== Other charted songs ===
Year	Album	Peak positions		Certification
Year	Album	FRA	BEL (Wa)	Certification
As Casseurs Flowters
2013	"Fais les backs"	115	—	Orelsan et Gringe sont les Casseurs Flowters
2013	"Dans la place pour être"	34	43 (Ultratip*)	Orelsan et Gringe sont les Casseurs Flowters
2013	"Regarde comme il fait beau (dehors)"	58	3 (Ultratip*)	Orelsan et Gringe sont les Casseurs Flowters
2015	"Inachevés"	101	—	Comment c'est loin
2015	"Si facile"	174	—	Comment c'est loin
Solo
2018	"Qui dit mieux" (feat. Orelsan, Vald & Suikon Blaz AD)	24	—	Enfant lune
2018	"Déchiré" (feat. Orelsan)	67	—	Enfant lune
2018	"Jusqu'où elle m'aime" (feat. Nemir)	97	—	Enfant lune
2018	"Paradis noir" (feat. DJ Pone)	110	—	Enfant lune
2018	"Retourne d'où tu viens"	113	—	Enfant lune
2018	"Je la laisse faire"	118	—	Enfant lune
2018	"Pièces détachées"	124	—	Enfant lune
2018	"Konnichiwa"	131	—	Enfant lune
2018	"On danse pas"	135	—	Enfant lune
2018	"Scanner" (feat. Léa Castel)	137	—	Enfant lune
2018	"Pour la nuit"	149	—	Enfant lune
2018	"Mémo"	170	—	Enfant lune
2018	"LMP"	190	—	Enfant lune
2024	"Fake ID"	—	—	Hypersensible
2024	"Du Plomb"	—	—	Hypersensible
2024	"Effet de Surplomb"	—	—	Hypersensible
2024	"Xan"	—	—	Hypersensible
2024	"Feelings" (feat. Orelsan)	—	—	Hypersensible
2024	"Au revoir BB"	—	—	Hypersensible
2024	"Corde Sensible" (feat. Saan)	—	—	Hypersensible
2024	"Nuits Fauves"	—	—	Hypersensible
2024	"Confessions d'un hypersensible"	—	—	Hypersensible
2024	"Boomer"	—	—	Hypersensible
2024	"Bad Mood" (feat. Sydney)	—	—	Hypersensible
2024	"Pensées positives (Interlude)"	—	—	Hypersensible
2024	"Une nuance au-dessus du noir"	—	—	Hypersensible
2024	"Couler des jours heureux"	—	—	Hypersensible

=== Featured in ===
Year	Album	Peak positions		Certification
Year	Album	FRA	BEL (Wa)	Certification
2012	"Ils sont cools" (Orelsan feat. Gringe)	66	—	Le chant des sirènes
2021	"Casseurs Flowters Infinity" (Orelsan feat. Gringe)	7	—	Civilisation

== Filmography ==
Cinema

- 2015: Comment c'est loin directed by Orelsan and himself : himself
- 2017: Carbone directed by Olivier Marchal : Simon Wizman
- 2018: Les Chatouilles directed by Andréa Bescond : Manu
- 2019: School's Out (L'Heure de la sortie) directed by Sébastien Marnier : Steve
- 2019: Damien veut changer le mondedirected by Xavier de Choudens: Rudy
- 2023: Through the Night (Quitter la nuit)

Television

- 2015–2016: Bloqués (TV series) in le Petit Journal of Canal + – as himself
- 2016–2017: Serge le Mytho (TV series, 5 episodes) in le Grand and le Gros Journal on Canal + – as himself
