= Ablaye =

Ablaye is a Senegalese masculine given name. Notable people with the name include:

- Ablaye Cissoko (born 1970), Senegalese musician, singer and composer
- Ablaye Yare Faye (born 1994), Senegalese footballer
- Mouhamed Ablaye Gaye (born 1983), Senegalese footballer
- Ablaye Mbaye (born 1990), Senegalese basketball player
- Baye Ablaye Mbaye (born 2004), Senegalese footballer
- Ablaye Mbengue (born 1992), Senegalese footballer
- Ablaye Sy (born 1994), Mauritanian footballer
