= Perdu d'avance =

Studio album by Orelsan
- Released: 16 February 2009
- Recorded: 2008; Viking Bastard Studio
- Genre: French hip hop
- Language: French
- Label: 3^{e} Bureau, 7th Magnitude
- Producer: Skread

Orelsan chronology
Perdu d'avance (2009)	Le chant des sirènes (2011)

Singles from Perdu d'avance
- 1. "Changement" Released: February 22, 2008

Perdu d'avance is the debut studio album by French rapper Orelsan. It was released on 16 February 2009 by 3^{e} Bureau and 7th Magnitude. It peaked at number 20 on the French Albums Chart, and was certified platinum by the SNEP, selling more than 100,000 copies in France. It was also nominated for a Prix Constantin award.

== Track listing ==
All songs written by Aurélien Cotentin and produced by Skread.

No.	Title	Length
1.	"Étoiles invisibles"	4:34
2.	"Changement"	3:17
3.	"Soirée ratée"	3:05
4.	"Différent"	3:44
5.	"No Life"	4:10
6.	"Pour le pire"	3:34
7.	"Perdu d'avance"	3:33
8.	"Gros poissons dans une petite mare"	4:33
9.	"Logo dans le ciel"	3:37
10.	"50 Pourcents"	4:40
11.	"Jimmy Punchline"	4:06
12.	"Entre bien et mal" (featuring Gringe)	4:41
13.	"Courez courez"	4:03
14.	"Peur de l'échec" (featuring Ron "Bumblefoot" Thal)	5:14
Total length:		56:51

Notes

- "Pour le pire" features vocals by Nadia.
- "Gros poissons dans une petite mare" features vocals by Keina.

== Personnel ==
Credits for Perdu d'avance adapted from Discogs.

- 123 Klan – Artwork
- Benjamin Brard – Artwork
- Jean-Pierre Chalbos – Mastering
- Véronica Ferraro – Mixing
- Gringe – Featured artist
- Keina – Vocals
- Manuel Lagos Cid – Photography
- Nadia – Vocals
- Orelsan – Primary artist
- Skread – Producer, recording
- Ron "Bumblefoot" Thal – Guitar, featured artist

== Chart performance ==
The album sold more than 100,000 copies in France.

Chart (2009)	Peak position
Belgian Albums (Ultratop Wallonia)	64
French Albums (SNEP)	20

== Certifications ==
Region	Certification	Certified units/sales
France (SNEP)	Platinum	100,000^{‡}
^{‡} Sales+streaming figures based on certification alone.
