= Brasco =

- Origin: Guadeloupe
- Genres: Hip hop
- Occupation: Rapper
- Years active: 2005–present
- Labels: bombattak recordz, O-VNEE Music
- Website: www.myspace.com/brascobombattak

Brasco is a French rapper, originally from Guadeloupe. He is signed to the label O-VNEE Music. Brasco's agency is called VMC (Major Company).

== Life and career ==
Brasco came to the inner suburbs of Paris from Guadeloupe in 1997. He started in rap by forming the group called Apothéose with two other artists. They released several EP's and participated in several mixtapes.

In 2005, along with El Matador, he recorded the CD "Bombattak Mc's", and started to build a reputation.

After participating in the soundtrack of the film Banlieue 13, he participated in the album of El Matador, Bombattak's other signed artist. After many postponements, Brasco released his first album "Vagabond" on 8 September 2008. This album was very successful. He released four music videos for this album: "Vagabond", "Ma France d'en bas" "D'une Blessure à l'autre" and "8000km". He also participated in the album U District 13 with his hit "Et Alors?" ("So what?").

In 2010 Brasco left the label Bombattak. He set up a new label: O-VNEE Music.

== Discography ==
- 2005: Bombattak Mc's
- 2008: Vagabond
- 2011: Kalabrezz project
