= Orelsan =

French rapper (born 1982)

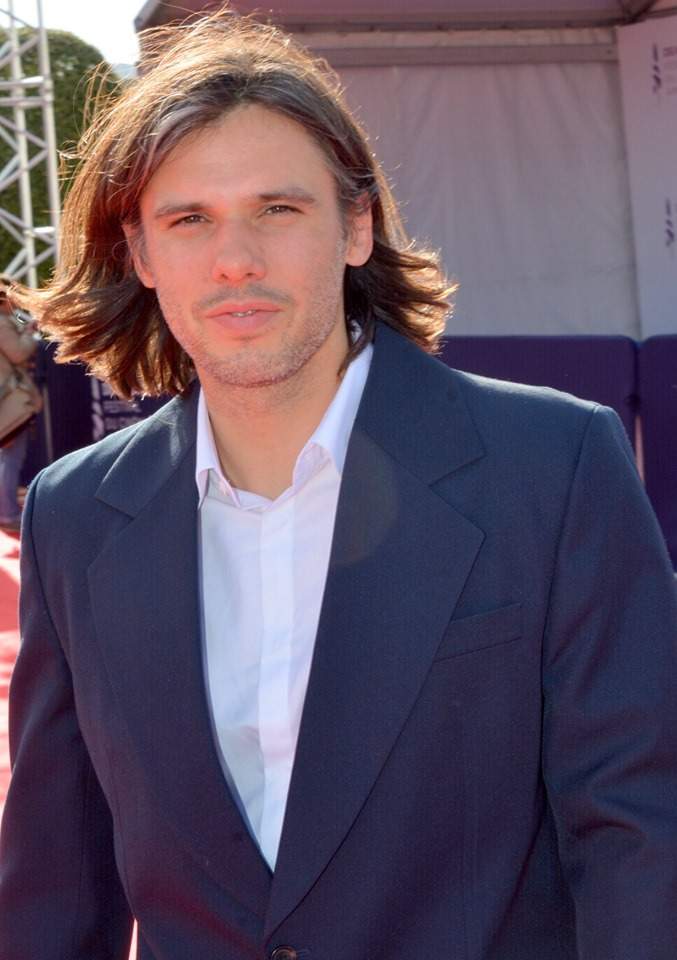
- Orelsan in 2019

Background information
- Also known as: Orel; Aurél; RaelSan; Jimmy Punchline
- Born: Aurélien Cotentin; 1 August 1982 (age 44); Alençon, Normandy, France
- Origin: Caen, Normandy, France
- Genre: French hip hop
- Occupations: Rapper; songwriter; record producer; actor; director
- Instrument: Vocals
- Years active: 2002–present
- Labels: 7th Magnitude; Wagram
- Member of: Casseurs Flowters
- Website: orelsan7th.com

Aurélien Cotentin (French pronunciation: [ɔʁeljɛ̃ kɔtɑ̃tɛ̃]; born 1 August 1982), better known by his stage name Orelsan (French: [ɔʁɛlsan]; sometimes stylized as OrelSan), is a French rapper, songwriter, record producer, actor and director. He has released five studio albums: his debut Perdu d'avance on 16 February 2009, his second album Le chant des sirènes on 26 September 2011, his third album La fête est finie on 20 October 2017, his fourth album Civilisation on 19 November 2021, and his fifth album La fuite en avant on 7 November 2025.

He is also one half of the French hip hop duo Casseurs Flowters, along with Gringe, with whom he has released two studio albums: Orelsan et Gringe sont les Casseurs Flowters in 2013, and the original soundtrack for their 2015 film Comment c'est loin.

His third album La fête est finie has been certified double diamond, selling more than one million copies in France. His fourth album Civilisation was the No.1 selling music album in France for two consecutive years of 2021 and 2022. His fifth album La fuite en avant has been certified platinum.

In 2022, Orelsan was named "Chevalier des Arts et des Lettres" (Knight of Arts and Letters) by the Ministry of Culture of France, rewarded for his creation in the artistic field and the contribution he has made to the influence of the arts in France and in the world.

== Life and career ==
=== 1982–2003: Early life and beginnings ===
Aurélien Cotentin was born on 1 August 1982 in Alençon in Lower Normandy, where he was raised by his father, a middle school principal, and his mother, a teacher. He initially listened to rock music and was also a fan of manga and comics. While practicing basketball, he picked up the love of rap through his basketball friends. He graduated with a French baccalauréat in Economic and Social Sciences before moving to Caen where he studied at l'École de management de Normandie, graduating in 2004. While in college, he made friends with record producer Skread, who had worked with Diam's, Booba, Rohff and Nessbeal. He also collaborated with Gringe in his initial works and formed the duo Casseurs Flowters with him in 2004.

Orelsan spent one year at the University of South Florida in Tampa, Florida, where he had the inspiration of writing the song "50 pour cent". In 2002, he issued a mixtape and was invited to contribute in various compilations. Returning to France and working the night shifts in a hotel gave him the opportunity to write more.

=== 2004–2010: Early career and Perdu d'avance ===
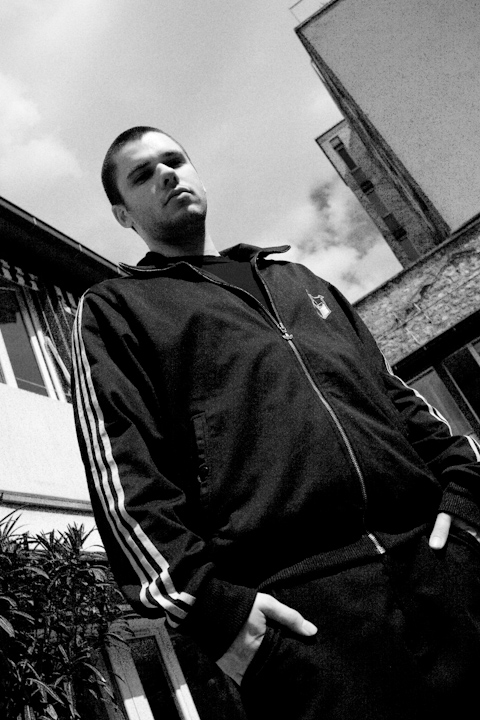
Orelsan in 2009.

In 2004, Orelsan formed the hip hop duo Casseurs Flowters with his colleague Gringe. With help from French record producer Skread, they released their first mixtape Fantasy: Episode 1 in 2004 with 11 tracks. Afterwards, the two decided to focus on building their solo careers.

In August 2006, Orelsan released his first clip on YouTube, called "Ramen", followed by a second one in 2007, called "Saint-Valentin", a sarcastic parody on Valentine's Day that attracted great following prompting him to release more of his work online through YouTube and Myspace.

In 2008, the record label 3^{e} Bureau noticed his work and offered him an opportunity to produce an album in collaboration with 7th Magnitude, a record label founded by Skread and his colleague Ablaye. In the summer of 2008, he promoted the release of "Changement", his first single released on 13 October 2008, and its music video through the TF1 Video and Nolife TV channels. The video was Orelsan's first professionally prepared clip.

On 16 February 2009, Orelsan released his debut album Perdu d'avance, a provocative album produced by Skread, that included 14 tracks. With "Changement" as its lead single, it included tracks such as the title track "Perdu d'avance", "50 pour cent", "Soirée ratée", "Différent" and "No-life", with music video releases for all. "Entre bien et mal" featured his Casseurs Flowters colleague Gringe and "La peur de l'échec" featured Guns N' Roses guitarist Ron "Bumblefoot" Thal. At the end of 2009, Orelsan was nominated for the Prix Constantin award, and won the MTV Europe Music Award for Best French Act, pipping highly favoured David Guetta to the prize.

In 2010, Orelsan also collaborated with The Toxic Avenger on the extended play N'importe comment, releasing three music videos, a single and a maxi single containing remixes, all on the Roy Music label.

On 26 June 2010, Orelsan appeared on Skyrock's Planète Rap, joining Jena Lee on the song "Je rêve en enfer" from her album Ma référence with Orelsan adding his punchlines in a version known as "Je rêve en enfer (Reste en enfer)". Also in 2010, Orelsan collaborated with Nessbeal in "Ma grosse" and was part of the Diversidad project, joining a great number of rappers from various European countries. His work appeared in the collective album of Diversidad called Diversidad – The Experience Album.

In September 2010, during an interview with Canal Street, Orelsan announced that he was working on his new album that would come out in 2011.

=== 2011–2012: Le chant des sirènes and rising recognition ===
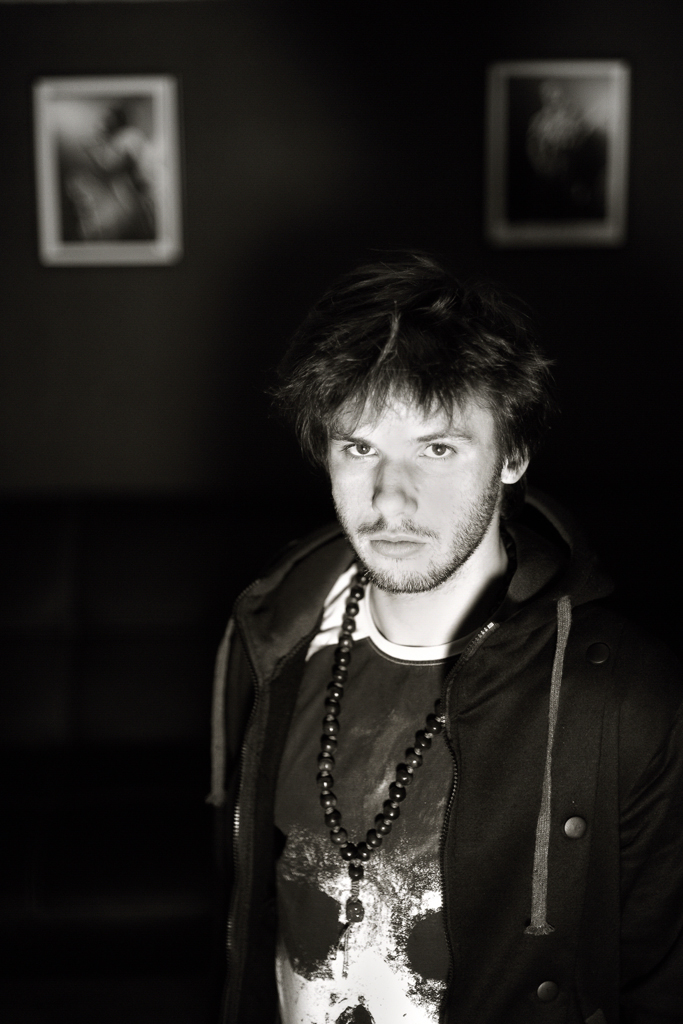
Orelsan, 2012.

On 30 May 2011, Orelsan released "RaelSan", a pre-release and lead single for his upcoming second album. Its second single, "Double vie", was made available through YouTube and Skyrock on 9 June. "Plus rien ne m'étonne" followed on 25 July, and finally "Suicide social" was released on 15 September.

The album Le chant des sirènes was released on 26 September 2011 with 16 tracks including popular tracks such as the title track "Le chant des sirènes", "Mauvaise idée" and "Finir mal". A fifth single, "La terre est ronde", was released from the album on 24 December, and a sixth single, "Ils sont cools" featuring Gringe, was released on 22 June 2012.

Receiving generally positive reviews from music critics, the album was certified gold only one month after release in France, with over 50,000 copies sold, was certified platinum in 2012 with over 100,000 copies sold, and was certified double platine by the SNEP in 2018 with over 200,000 copies sold in France. The album peaked at number 3 on the French (SNEP) Albums Chart, at number 9 on the Belgian (Wallonia) Ultratop Albums Chart, and at number 32 on the Swiss (Hitparade) Albums Chart.

On 3 March 2012, Orelsan won two awards in Victoires de la Musique, one in the category "Urban Album of the Year" for Le chant des sirènes, and for "Group or Artist Popular Revelation of the Year" chosen by the public.

=== 2013–2014: Casseurs Flowters reunion and debut studio album ===
In 2013, Orelsan's recognition continued growing further, as he was nominated for the Victoires de la Musique award for Male Artist of the Year, while he was given the Prix de la Création Musicale award for Songwriter of the Year. He was also nominated for the NRJ Music Award for French Revelation of the Year, and at the 2013 Trace Urban Music Awards, he was nominated for the Male Artist of the Year and Best Live Performance awards, while "La terre est ronde" was nominated for Best Song and "Ils sont cools" featuring Gringe nominated for Best Music Video.

Following the success of Le chant des sirènes, Orelsan released his first collaborative single as Casseurs Flowters with Gringe, "Bloqué", on 3 July 2013 as a pre-release for their upcoming debut studio album. Orelsan et Gringe sont les Casseurs Flowters was released on 15 November 2013 to generally positive reviews, and includes tracks such as "Regarde comme il fait beau (dehors)", "La mort du disque", "Dans la place pour être" and "Fais les backs", which all charted in France despite not being released as singles. The album was then certified gold in France by the UPFI in 2014, having sold over 50,000 copies.

=== 2015–2017: Comment c'est loin and La fête est finie ===
On 21 March 2015, Orelsan posted a photo of a script with the working title Orel et Gringe (Orel and Gringe) on his Instagram page. On 4 May, he posted another photo, this time of himself with Gringe in the film, confirming that shooting for the film was complete and that its title would be Comment c'est loin.

On 29 October 2015 Orelsan and Gringe released "À l'heure où je me couche" as a single from the film's original soundtrack, which was confirmed to be released on the same day as the film. Both were released on 9 December and, like Orelsan et Gringe sont les Casseurs Flowters, received generally positive reviews from critics. Two more songs from the album, "Inachevés" and "Si facile", also charted in France despite not being released as singles. The album was certified platinum in France in January 2017.

In April 2017, Orelsan announced that he and Gringe were working on their third and debut solo studio albums respectively, but did not reveal any release dates. On 20 September 2017, Orelsan released the first single from his third solo album, entitled "Basique", along with its music video in which the album's release date was revealed to be 20 October 2017. On 22 September 2017, Orelsan revealed the name of the album, La fête est finie, along with its cover art.

On 20 October 2017, La fête est finie was released, to huge critical and commercial success: the album was certified gold by the SNEP within three days, platinum within a week, and diamond within eight months. In January 2023, the album reached a new milestone in terms of impressive sales record: it has been certified double diamond by the SNEP with over 1,000,000 copies sold in France.

La fête est finie was nominated for IMPALA's European Album of the Year Award.

On 9 February 2018, Orelsan won three awards in Victoires de la Musique of 2018, one in the category of "Urban Album of the Year" for La fête est finie, one in the category of "Male Artist of the Year", and one in "Audiovisual Creation" for the music video of "Basique", one of the lead singles of the album.

On 8 February 2019, Orelsan won the award of "Musical Show, Tour or Concert of the Year" for his tour in Victoires de la Musique of 2019.

=== 2021–present: Civilisation ===
Civilisation is his fourth studio album, released on 19 November 2021 through 7th Magnitude, 3e Bureau and Wagram. The album was largely produced by long-time collaborator Skread and features guest appearances by Gringe and The Neptunes. It marks his first album release in over four years. Most notable singles include L'odeur de l'essence, "Jour meilleur" and "La quête" .

The album made a record-breaking debut on the French Albums Chart, selling more units than any other album in 2021. The album topped at 1st on French and Belgian (Wallonia) charts, as well as 2nd on Swiss charts at its best week. It was certified diamond by the SNEP within five months in France, becoming the fastest album to be certified diamond in the history of French rap.

According to the SNEP, Civilisation was the No.1 selling album in France for two consecutive years of 2021 and 2022.

On 11 February 2022, Orelsan won three awards at Victoires de la Musique of 2022, one in the category of "Male Artist of the Year", one in the category of "Original Song of the Year" for the lead single L'odeur de l'essence, and one in the category of "Video of the Year" for "Montre jamais ça à personne", a documentary about Orelsan directed by his younger brother, Clément Cotentin. In November 2022, Orelsan won two awards at 2022 NRJ Music Award: Francophone Male Artist of the Year and Francophone Tour of the Year.

In February 2023, Orelsan won three awards at Victoires de la Musique of 2023, one in the category of "Concert of the Year" for his Civilisation tour, one in the category of "Original Song of the Year" for the lead single "La Quête", and another one in the category of "Music Video of the Year" for the music video of "La Quête". By 2023, Orelsan has won a total of twelve awards at Victoires de la Musique, surpassing French music legends Johnny Hallyday and Alain Souchon who had 10 trophies each.

=== 2025–present: Yoroï and La fuite en avant ===
In 2025, Orelsan made a comeback to music after a three-year break. He announced a major tour in France that began in January 2026 in Caen. During the tour, he also performed at the Château de Chambord for Chambord Live and will hold a series of fifteen concerts at the Accor Arena in Paris in December 2026. On 7 November 2025, he released his fifth album, La fuite en avant. The album features 17 tracks and explores themes heavily inspired by his own life story, particularly his experience as a father. Orelsan also starred in the film Yoroï, which was released on 29 October 2025 in France, and was directed by David Tomaszewski and co-written by Orelsan.

== Controversy ==
=== Printemps de Bourges ===
In 2009, controversy erupted when some of Orelsan's earliest work was deemed by certain media to include violent and misogynist lyrics, specifically in "Saint-Valentin" and "Sale pute" (the latter is French for "Dirty whore"). Neither song appeared on his debut album Perdu d'avance, but were available online. Many blog campaigns followed, demanding that he would be banned from appearing at a scheduled gig at the Printemps de Bourges festival. The campaign took a political turn with both the French Communist Party (PCF) and the French Socialist Party (PS) supporting the campaign. The Socialist Party claimed in a communiqué that the song included "a scandalous, odious text that incited violence directly". It also supported the campaign to remove Orelsan from Printemps de Bourges. French Secretary of State for Solidarity Valérie Létard considered "Sale pute" sexist and violent and demanded that websites remove the video from their sites. She also offered help to groups that wanted to file a lawsuit based on Article 24 of the law on freedom of the press, that forbids incitement to commit crimes.

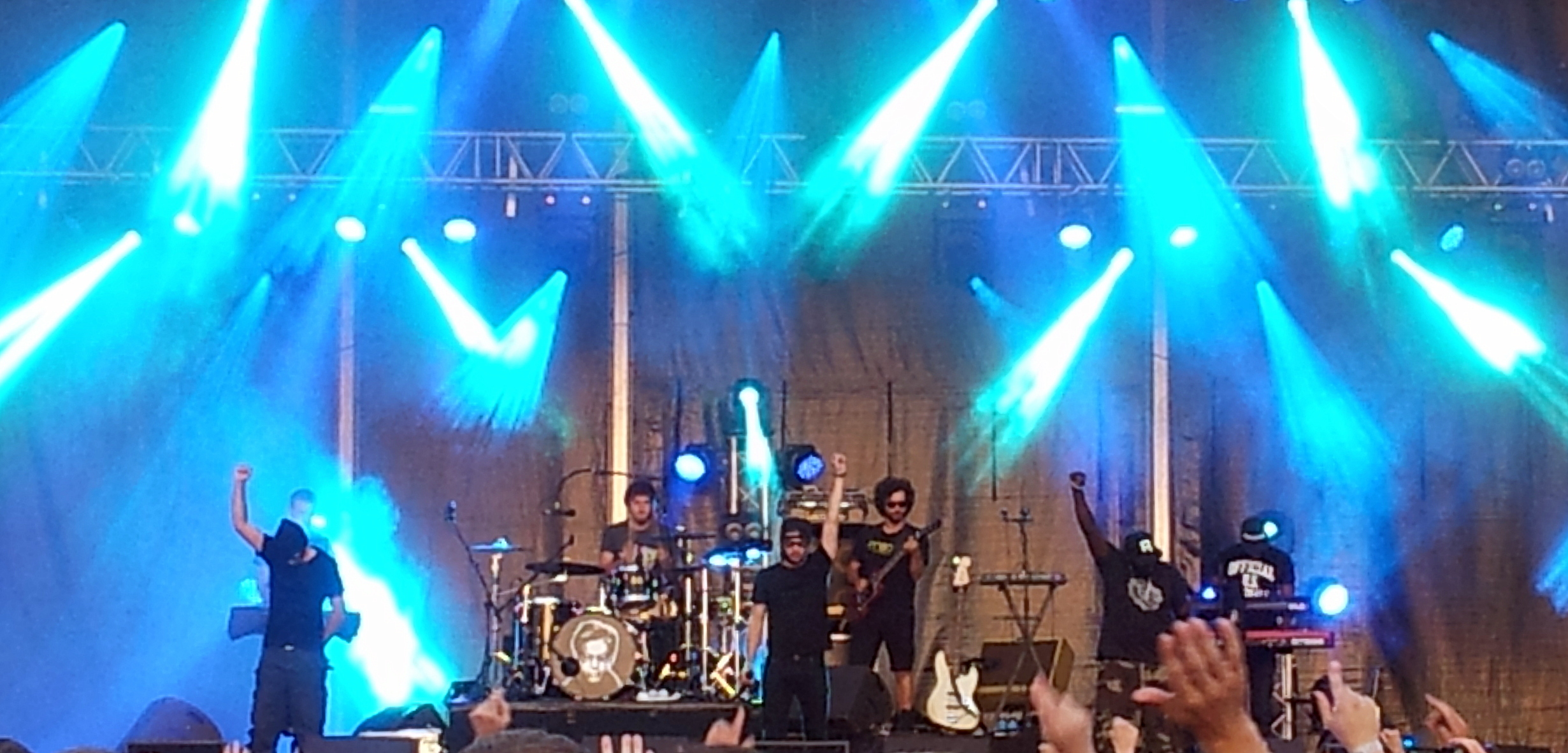
Orelsan (middle) performing at the Nuits Secrètes Festival at Aulnoye-Aymeries, France on 4 August 2013.

Orelsan was taken aback by the controversy. In an interview with Planète Rap Mag: "In this song, I try to show how an impulsive drive can turn someone into a monster. I shot a clip where I am wearing a suit and tie and am drinking alcohol, to show that this is a fiction. In no way do I condone domestic violence. The attitude of this character disgusts me, but I feel I am artistically representing the hatred exactly as a film like A Clockwork Orange does. [...] In the storyline, I have actually been deceived by my girlfriend, and I wanted to describe the impulse of rage that you can have in such times. This is not a misogynist text on the contrary". He added: "I admit that these lyrics can shock" and he apologized about it, mentioning that he had not performed the song live for several months and it did not appear on his album Perdu d'avance. He added: "[However] whatever I said, I will always be less violent than the series broadcast on TF1, where a guy gets hit every five minutes for no reason".

The Printemps de Bourges organisers insisted on keeping Orelsan on the show scheduled for 25 April 2009, saying in a communique: "As outrageous as are the lyrics of this song, we have hired Orelsan as a young artist for an artistic performance noting that his album does not include this [particular] song. For this reason, we do not remove [the date for] Orelsan's performance as we are fulfilling our artistic choices. This French language hip hop album presents good texts that seem a perfect reflection of a 20-year-old French generation, a bit lost and disillusioned". Despite explanations, François Bonneau, the President of the Regional Council of the Centre, threatened financial reprisals against the festival if it didn't reconsider its decision. It also deducted a proportional part of its subvention to the festival. Orelsan did eventually appear at the festival despite the campaign.

The Printemps de Bourges controversy had repercussions elsewhere. When Les Francofolies de La Rochelle festival decided to ban Orelsan from performing, he protested the intervention, citing censorship on artistic works. The singer Cali protested to the organizers including Jean-Louis Foulquier, who had in turn accused Ségolène Royal of threats to stop the financial support.

Frédéric Lefebvre, the spokesman for Union pour un Mouvement Populaire (UMP) said that the matter was blown out of proportion declaring that he supported the young artist's freedom of expression and denounced attempts of censorship by Ségolène Royal against him. Royal denied any "chantage" or threats, expressing her satisfaction that the organizers had decided to cancel Orelsan's gig. On 14 July 2009, French Minister of Culture Frédéric Mitterrand made a declaration of support for the rapper for freedom of expression, judging the whole controversy ridiculous. Many artists also came to Orelsan's support. Many French radio stations have censored at times Orelsan's songs due to protests from feminists and others, and the media have dubbed him the "Eminem of French rap".

Orelsan explained the lyrics of "Sale pute" to AFP as the expression of these mixed feelings between love and hatred, and eventually dropped the song from his repertoire.

=== Legal issues ===
The gay French magazine Têtu has publicly questioned some of Orelsan's lyrics as being homophobic. In June 2012, at the Sakifo Festival in Réunion, the regional council of the island suppressed its subvention of €150,000 or one tenth of the budget of the festival. The arrival of Orelsan was questioned, but finally the organisers went on with it, but took to pay back €1 for every ticket sold for the date of the show to associations that protested. The song that caused the most controversy was "Saint-Valentin".

On 31 May 2013, Orelsan was given a suspended fine of €1,000 for insult and incitement of violence against women, for certain texts of his songs performed during a concert in Paris in May 2009, by the Correctional Tribunal of Paris. The disputed texts represented "2% of the concert", "it is a fictitious work", which told "a precise story in a precise context", Orelsan had assured. On 14 May 2014, the Court of Appeal of Paris closed the case by putting an end to all lawsuits and the original complaint filed against Orelsan, finding that action taken against him by five feminist associations was prescribed.

== Discography ==
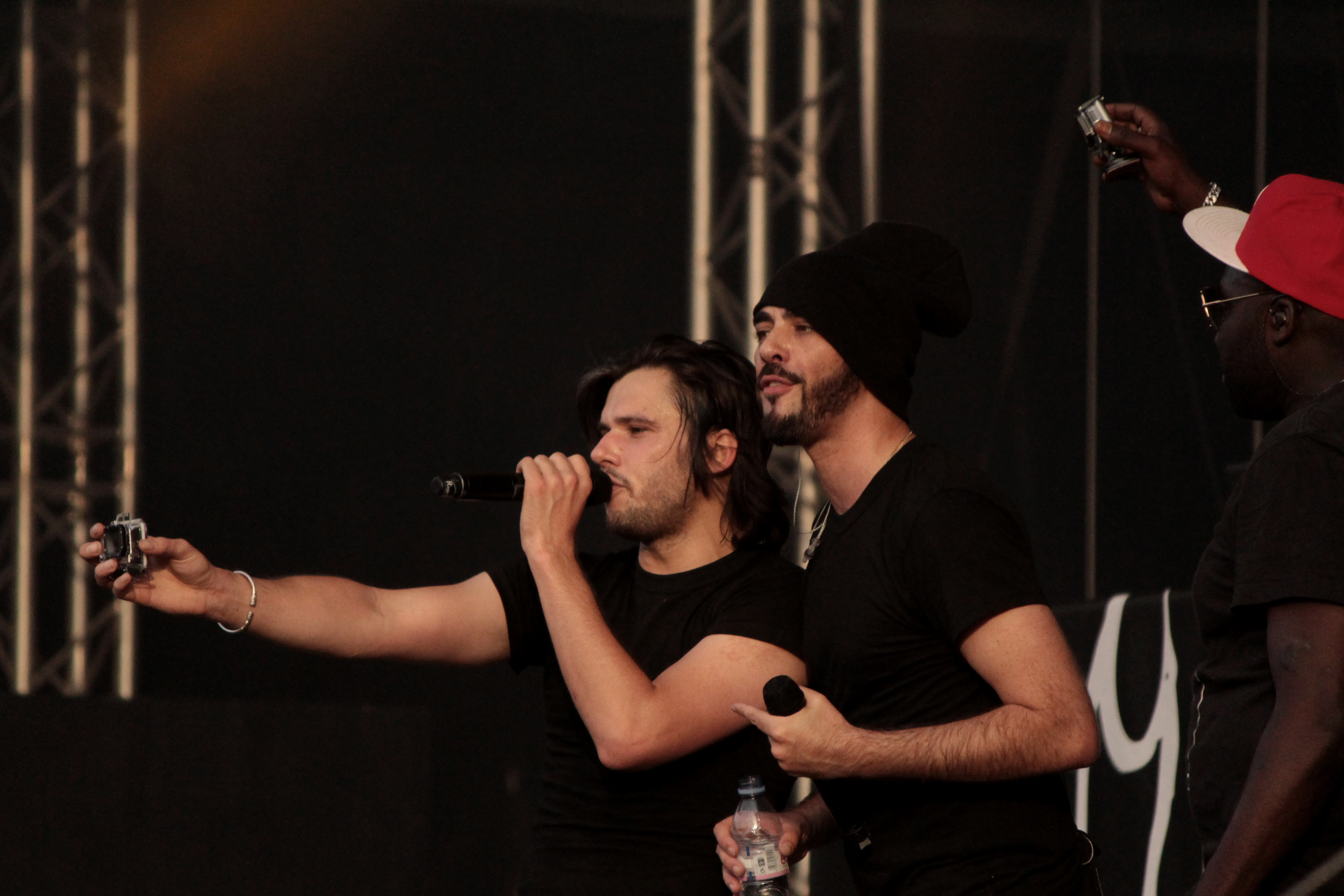
Orelsan with Gringe and Ablaye at the Festival des Vieilles Charrues in 2014

=== Studio albums ===
- Perdu d'avance (2009)
- Le chant des sirènes (2011)
- La fête est finie (2017)
- Civilisation (2021)
- La fuite en avant (2025)

== Filmography ==
Year	Title	Role	Director	Notes
2013	Les Gars	Himself	Adolf El Assal	
2015	Comment c'est loin	Aurélien "Orel" Cotentin	Christophe Offenstein & Orelsan	Also writer
2015	Peur de rien	Julien's friend	Danielle Arbid	
2015–2016	Bloqués	Orel	Kyan Khojandi & Bruno Muschio	TV series Short (120 Episodes)
2016–2017	Serge le Mytho	Orel	Kyan Khojandi & Bruno Muschio	TV series short (5 Episodes)
2016	One-Punch Man	Saitama	Shingo Natsume	French voice
2017	Mutafukaz	Angelino	Shôjirô Nishimi & Guillaume Renard	French voice
2018	Au poste !	Sylvain	Quentin Dupieux	
2018	Girls with Balls	Cowboy	Olivier Afonso	
2020	Felicità	Astronaut	Bruno Merle	
2020	La Flemme	Fabulo	Jonathan Cohen, Jérémie Galan & Florent Bernard	TV series Episode 2
2021–2022	Montre jamais ça à personne (ORELSAN: Don't ever show this to anyone)	Himself	Clément Cotentin & Christophe Offenstein	Documentary Series (10 Episodes, available on Amazon Prime)
2023	Astérix et Obélix : L'Empire du Milieu	Titanix	Guillaume Canet	
2025	Yoroï	Orelsan/Orelsama	David Tomaszewski	Also writer

== See also ==
- Casseurs Flowters
- Gringe
- Skread
- 7th Magnitude
- Honorific nicknames in popular music
- List of MTV Europe Music Award for Best French Act winners
- Wagram Music
