= Casseurs Flowters =

French music duo

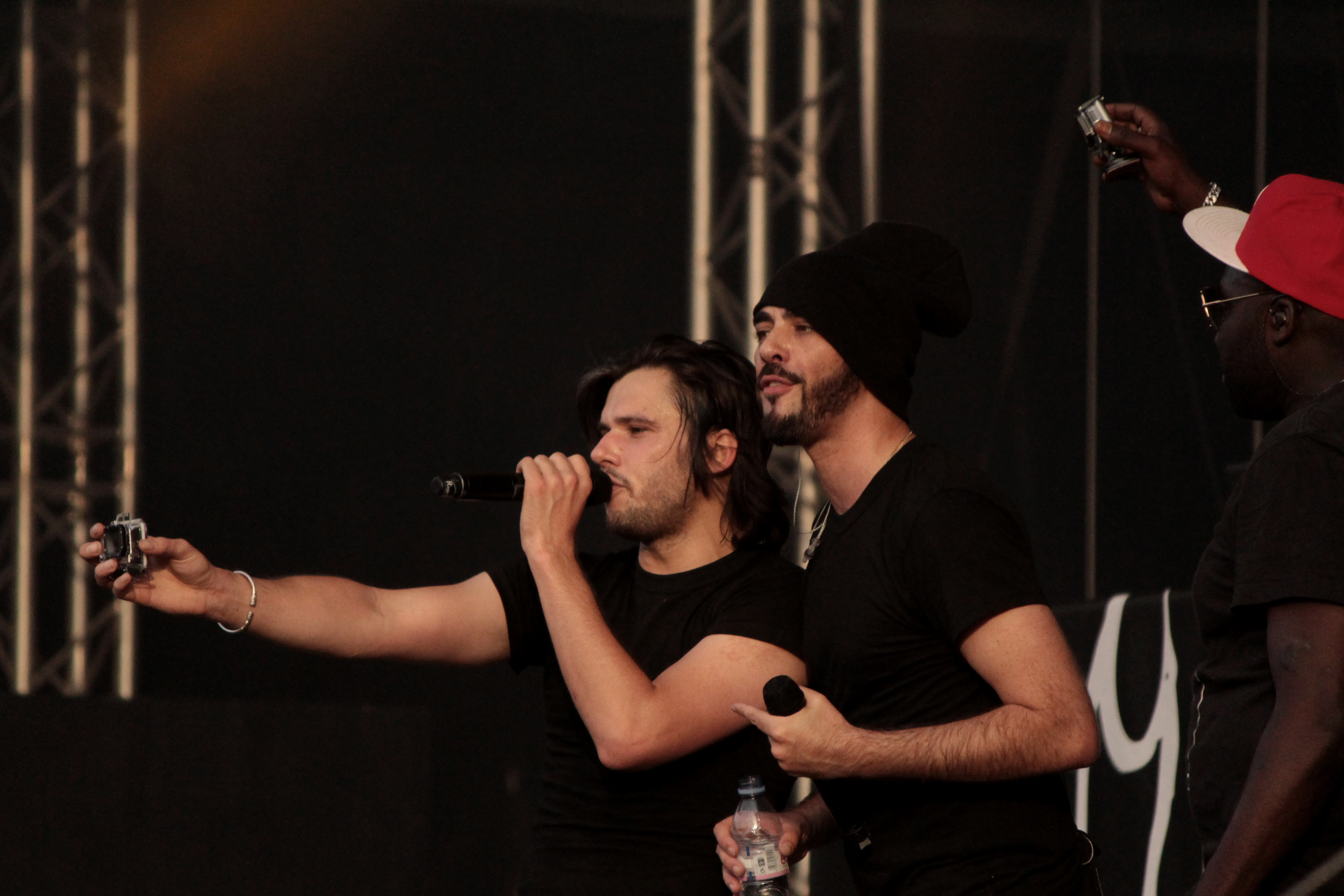
- Orelsan (left) and Gringe (centre) at the Festival des Vieilles Charrues in 2014

Background information
- Origin: Caen, Calvados, France
- Genres: French hip hop; Comedy hip hop
- Years active: 2004–present
- Labels: 7th Magnitude; Wagram Music
- Members: Orelsan; Gringe
- Website: Official Facebook page

Casseurs Flowters (French pronunciation: [kɑsœʁ flotœʁ]) is a French hip hop duo established in 2004 by rappers Orelsan and Gringe. The duo's name is a reference to the two "Wet Bandits" from the movie Home Alone, called the "Casseurs Flotteurs" in the French dialogue.

== History ==
The two rappers met in the year 2000 in Paris. Les Inrocks describe their meeting as being "as simple as a Franck Dumas match analysis."

People had told me about him [Orelsan]. I knew that he hosted a roller skating program on the radio, that he was passionate about hip hop and I saw him hanging out in town with his Cambodian military uniforms. [...] He came to see me and asked me if I wanted to start a group with him, and I immediately said yes. We began writing songs without any ambition. We were rapping on the B-sides of The Roots even when I hate The Roots. We composed songs with the sound card of a comp we stole at my UIT. Initially, we wrote for our friends, that's it. And then Orel professionalised his thing. In the meantime, I met a girl and I went back to studying a bit.

— Gringe, in an interview with Les Inrocks.

Casseurs Flowters released their first mixtape Fantasy: Episode 1 with 11 tracks, with help from French record producer Skread, in 2004. Afterwards, the two rappers decided to focus on building their solo careers, with Orelsan releasing Perdu d'avance in 2009 and Le chant des sirènes in 2011, his first two studio albums, and Gringe releasing a mixtape entitled Fantasy Mixtape in 2009.

Following the success of Orelsan's second studio album Le chant des sirènes, the duo released their first collaborative single, "Bloqué", on 3 July 2013, as a pre-release for their upcoming debut studio album, Orelsan et Gringe sont les Casseurs Flowters, which was released on 15 November 2013 to generally positive reviews.

=== Other works ===
Gringe has released a number of independent materials and has collaborated with a number of artists such as El Matador, Brasco, Pit Baccardi, La Province, Jamal and Nubi.

Orelsan has also released a number of other independent materials, notably the Zéro EP with 14 tracks that included five tracks featuring his work with Gringe as Casseurs Flowters, namely "Arrêtes", "Toc Toc", "Mauvaises ondes", "Venu pour flowter" and "J'vais baiser ta femme".

== Discography ==
=== Studio albums ===
- Orelsan et Gringe sont les Casseurs Flowters (2013)
- Comment c'est loin (2015)

=== Mixtapes ===
- Fantasy: Épisode 1 (2004)

== Awards and nominations ==
Year	Event	Recipient	Award	Result	Reference(s)
2014	MTV Europe Music Awards	Casseurs Flowters	Best French Act	Nominated	
