= Skread =

French hip hop record producer and composer

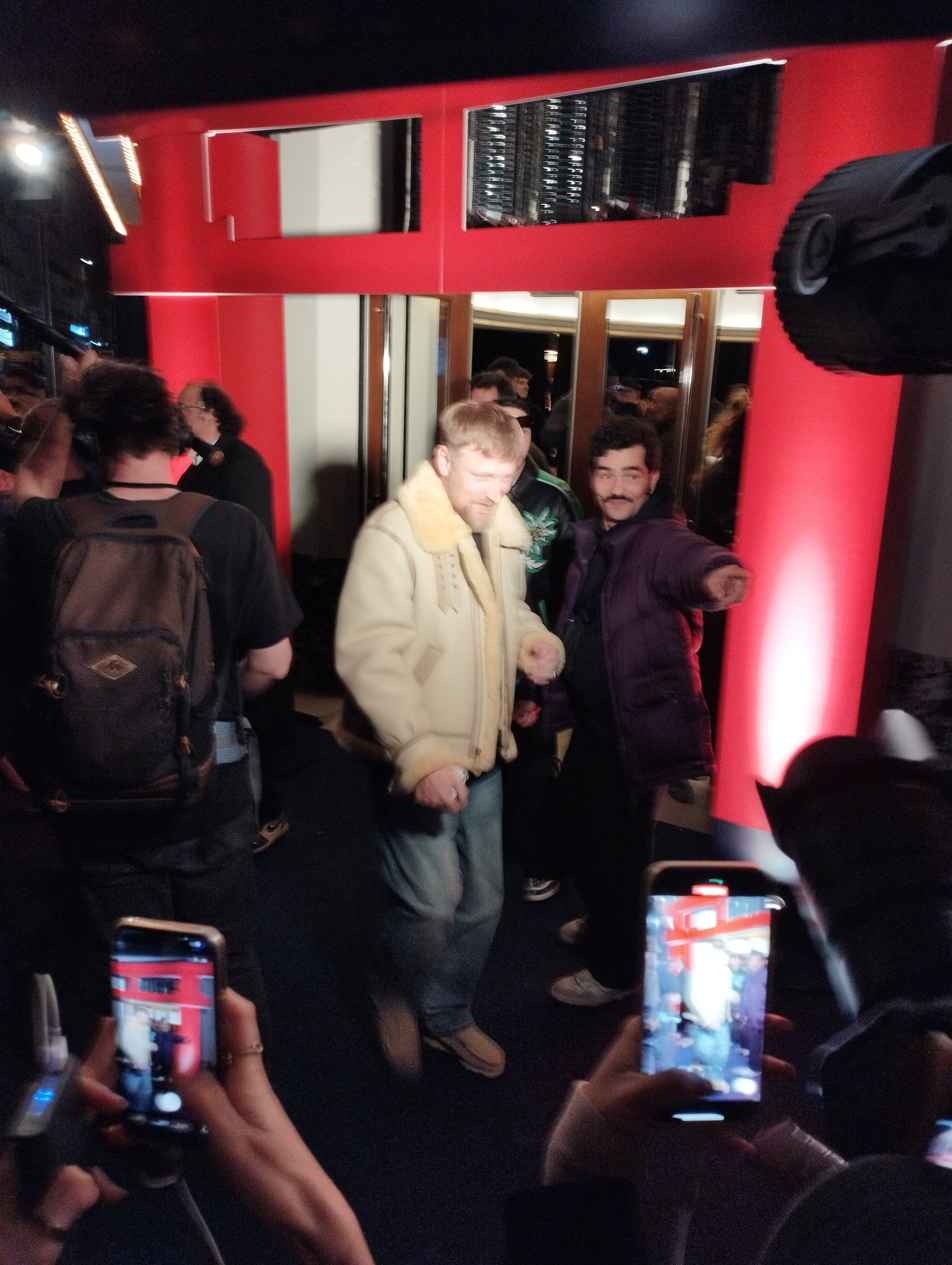
- Skread (middle) in 2025

Background information
- Born: Matthieu Le Carpentier; 22 September 1981 (age 45); Hérouville-Saint-Clair, Lower Normandy, France
- Genre: Hip hop
- Occupations: Record producer, beatmaker, composer
- Years active: 2004–present
- Label: 7th Magnitude

Matthieu Le Carpentier (French pronunciation: [matjø lə kaʁpɑ̃tje]; born September 22, 1981, Hérouville-Saint-Clair), known professionally as Skread (/skrɛd/), is a French hip hop record producer and composer. He is the co-founder in 2006 of the record label 7th Magnitude, with his partner "Ablaye" Abdoulaye Doucouré, which Orelsan and Gringe are signed to. His nickname Skread is a slang word that means "discreet".

== Career ==
He started his career in 2004 by producing on the most significant albums of the period (Booba, Diam's, Rohff) winning song of the year award in 2006 with Diams and producing several tracks on multi-platinum and diamond selling albums. In 2008 he decided to focus on Orelsan, his artist signed on his own label called 7th Magnitude.

Orelsan's first solo album Perdu d'avance released in 2009 and fully produced by Skread went platinum. His second act in 2011, Le chant des sirènes mainly produced by Skread went 2 times platinum and won 2 awards for best rap album, and audience choice award.

After a year and a half of European tour with Orelsan, Skread produced in 2013 the album of Casseurs Flowters (Orelsan and Gringe) that went platinum. In 2015 he produced the music and played in Orelsan's movie Comment c’est loin released in theaters in France, Belgium and Switzerland. The movie OST performed by Casseurs Flowters and produced by Skread went also twice platinum.

In 2017 he produced Orelsan's third solo album La fête est finie featuring artists like Stromae, Dizzee Rascal, Nekfeu, Maitre Gims, Ibeyi, Eugy and Kojo Funds. The album went platinum the first week and became 9 times platinum (more than 900k)

The last album won 4 awards for "Best rap album", "Best tour". Male artist of the Year" and "Video of the Year" for the track "Basique" produced by Skread.

Skread was on stage during the worldwide sold-out tour that hits 50 festivals, 28 arenas in Europe, including 4 Accor Hotel Arenas in Paris.

On this project Skread especially produced the tracks "Basique" (certified diamond with more than 50M streams and 82M views), "Reves Bizarres" featuring Damso (certified platinum and 47M views) co-produced « Tout va bien » with Stromae as well as 5 other certified platinums singles. He also produced "Tout ce que je sais" featuring YBN Cordae. The same year, he executive produced the album "Afro Trap Volume 1" hosted by MHD, that features Aya Nakamura, Dj Arafat, Sidiki Diabaté, Sarkodie and Kiff no beat.

In 2018, Skread produced the tracks "Alhadji baller" and "Pepperdem" on Shirazee's EP Home and away which featured Saint Jhn and Eugy released on 7th Magnitude and Juss different.

In 2020, Skread has produced "23" from Burna Boy's new album Twice as Tall and is announced on a track featuring himself and Chris Brown and Dadju on the No limit album.

== Discography ==
=== Compilation albums ===
- 2005 – Instrus
- 2013 – Instrus 2.0

=== Singles ===
List of singles, with selected chart positions
Title	Year	Peak chart positions	Album
Title	Year	FRA	Album
"A.V.S.D." (with Gazo and Tiakola)	2023	16	La Mélo est Gangx

=== Production ===
The following is a list of albums in which Skread has produced as either producer or co-producer, showing year released, performing artists and album name.

Year	Artist	Album
2004	Booba	Panthéon
2004	Nysay	L'asphaltape
2004	Nysay	Starting Blocks
2004	Street Lourd	Street Lourd Hall Stars
2005	Booba	Autopsie, Vol. 1
2005	Brasco and El Matador	Bombattak MC's
2005	IV My People	Mission
2005	LIM	Enfant du ghetto
2005	Lino	Paradis assassiné
2005	Rohff	Au-delà de mes limites
2005	Sinik	La main sur le cœur
2006	Diam's	Dans ma bulle
2006	DJ Whoo Kid and DJ Cut Killer	Mixtape Evolution
2006	Hostile Records	Hostile 2006
2006	Nessbeal	La mélodie des briques
2006	Nysay	Au pied du mur
2007	El Matador	Parti de rien
2007	Passi	Evolution
2007	Salif	Boulogne Boy
2008	Nessbeal	Rois sans couronne
2008	Salif	Prolongations
2009	Frenesik Industry	Maghreb United
2009	Orelsan	Perdu d'avance
2009	Taipan	Punchliner
2010	Isleym	Avec le temps
2010	Nessbeal	NE2S
2011	Nessbeal	Sélection naturelle
2011	Orelsan	Le chant des sirènes
2013	Casseurs Flowters	Orelsan et Gringe sont les Casseurs Flowters
2014	Disiz	Transe-lucide
2014	Isleym	Où ça nous mène
2015	Casseurs Flowters	Comment c'est loin
2017	Orelsan	La fête est finie
2018	Orelsan	La fête est finie - Épilogue
2021	Orelsan	Civilisation

== Filmography ==
Year	Title	Role	Notes
2015	Comment c'est loin	Himself	Semi-autobiographical film
