= Wagram Music =

French independent record label

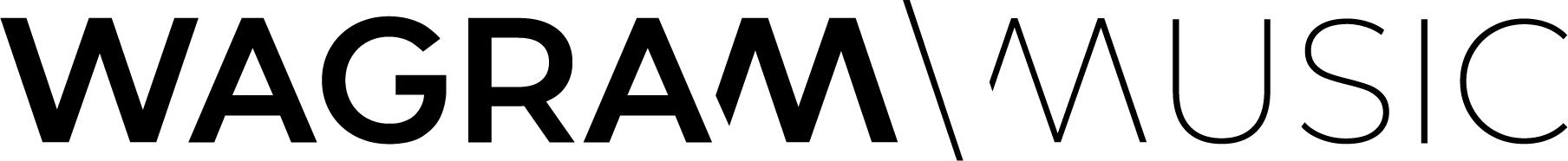
- Founded: 1999
- Status: Active
- Genre: Various
- Country of origin: France
- Location: Paris, Île-de-France, Los Angeles, Berlin
- Official website: wagram-stories.com

Wagram Music is a French independent record company based in Paris, with offices in Berlin and Los Angeles.

== History ==
The company was founded by Stephan Bourdoiseau and has been active since January 2003. In 2013, Stephan became the majority shareholder of Wagram. On October 2, 2023, Wagram signed a partnership with Deezer.

== Record company ==
Wagram's catalog covers various music genres such as French pop, Rock and Pop, world, electronic music, Reggae, Soul, Jazz and Blues. Represented artists include Orelsan, - M -, Lamomali, Fatoumata Diawara, Dominique A, Suzanne, Philippe Katerine, Bertrand Belin, Inna de Yard, Ken Booth, Malik Djoudi, and Corneille.

Wagram Music has several subsidiary record labels:

- Cinq7, which includes the artists: Saez, Dominique A, Gush, Lilli Wood & The Prick, Melanie Pain, Rover, Oxmo Puccino, Tété, The Dø, etc.
- 3ème Bureau, which includes the artists: Orelsan, Casseurs Flowters, Pony Pony Run Run, Naive New Beaters, Brigitte, and Ayọ.
- Chapter Two Records, which includes the artists: Winston Mcanuff, Fixi, Zoufris Maracas, Soviet Suprem, Clinton Fearon, and Inna de Yard.
- WLab, which includes the artists: Corneille, Ridsa, and Caravan Palace.
- LaBréa.
- Belem.

Wagram is also affiliated with the record label Panenka (Therapy Taxi).

Wagram Music is a distributor, both digitally and physically, in France and internationally of its own labels and some prestigious labels like Beggars, Panenka, Radio Nova, Buddha Bar, etc.

== Other activities ==
Wagram opened W Spectacle, its live company, in 2010. It manages concerts and tours for a roster of around 40 artists, including Rover, R.wan, Winston McAnuff, Fatoumata Diawara, Bertrand Belin, and Ayọ.

Wagram Music is part of Wagram Stories, a global and independent artistic production company, involved in film and series production (Wagram Film), book publishing (Wagram Livres), live music, and communication (Wagram Agency).

== See also ==
- List of record labels
