= Nessbeal discography =

- Studio albums: 5
- Singles: 6
- Mixtapes: 1

The following article outlines the discography of French rapper and songwriter Nessbeal, which includes five studio albums, one mixtape and six singles.

== Albums ==
=== Studio albums ===
Title	Album details	Peak chart positions	
Title	Album details	BEL (WA)	FRA
La mélodie des briques	Released: 20 March 2006; Format: Digital download, CD; Label: Nouvelle Donne	—	24
Rois sans couronne	Released: 9 June 2008; Format: Digital download, CD; Label: Nouvelle Donne, Because Éditions	—	18
NE2S	Released: 14 June 2010; Format: Digital download, CD; Label: 7th Magnitude, Because Éditions, Sony Music France	50	13
Sélection naturelle	Released: 21 November 2011; Format: Digital download, CD; Label: 7th Magnitude, Sony Music France	—	27
Zonard des étoiles	Released: 25 March 2022; Format: Digital download, CD; Label: Morning Glory, Because Music	49	—

=== Mixtapes ===
Title	Album details	Peak chart positions
Title	Album details	FRA
RSC Sessions Perdues	Released: November 21, 2011; Format: Digital download, CD, DVD; Label: Nouvelle Donne, Musicast	90

== Singles ==
=== As lead artist ===
Single	Year	Peak chart positions		Album
Single	Year	BEL (WA)	FRA	Album
"Ça bouge pas"	2010	—	—	NE2S
"À chaque jour suffit sa peine"	2010	15	—	NE2S
"Ma grosse" (featuring Orelsan)	2010	—	—	NE2S
"L'histoire d'un mec qui coule"	2011	—	—	Sélection naturelle
"Force et honneur"	2011	—	58	Sélection naturelle
"Gunshot"	2011	—	—	Sélection naturelle

=== As featured artist ===
Single	Year	Peak chart positions		Album
Single	Year	BEL (WA)	FRA	Album
"Banlieue Sale Music" (La Fouine featuring Nessbeal)	2010	15	—	Capital du crime, Vol. 2
"Red Zone" (Lacrim featuring Nessbeal & Rimkus)	2010	—	140	Ripro Vol.1
