= List of awards and nominations received by Orelsan =

Orelsan awards and nominations
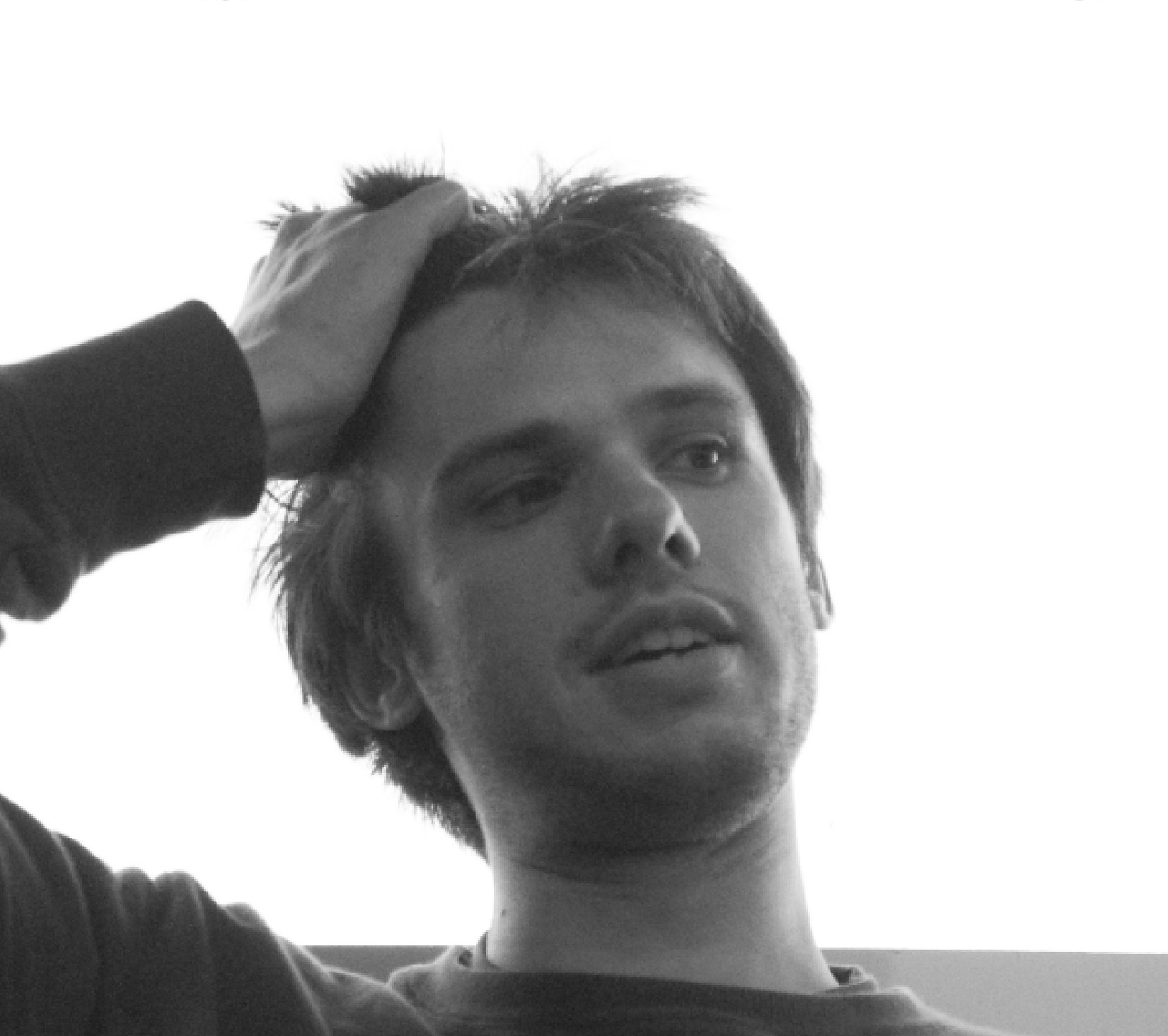
Awards and nominations
Award	Wins	Nominations
MTV Europe	1	2
NRJ	2	6
Prix Constantin	0	1
Prix de la Création Musicale	1	0
Trace Urban Music Awards	0	4
Victoires de la Musique	12	5

Totals (Note: Certain award groups do not simply award one winner. They acknowledge several different recipients, have runners-up, and have third place. Since this is a specific recognition and is different from losing an award, runner-up mentions are considered wins in this award tally. For simplification and to avoid errors, each award in this list has been presumed to have had a prior nomination.)
- Wins: 16
- Nominations: 18

French rapper and songwriter Orelsan began his career in 2004 and has since received many awards and nominations.

Orelsan's debut studio album, Perdu d'avance, earned him a nomination for the 2009 Prix Constantin. The same year, he won the MTV Europe Music Award for Best French Act, pipping highly favoured David Guetta to the prize.

His second studio album, Le chant des sirènes, won the 2012 Victoires de la Musique award for "Urban Music Album of the Year", and Orelsan won the award for "Group or Artist Popular Revelation of the Year". The music video of "RaelSan", the album's lead single, was nominated for "Music Video of the Year".

In 2013, Orelsan was nominated for the 2013 Victoires de la Musique award for "Male Artist of the Year", while in the same year he won the Prix de la Création Musicale award for "Songwriter of the Year". He was also nominated for the NRJ Music Award for French Revelation of the Year in 2013. At the 2013 Trace Urban Music Awards, Orelsan was nominated for the Male Artist of the Year and Best Live Performance awards, while "La terre est ronde" was nominated for Best Song and "Ils sont cools" featuring Gringe was nominated for Best Music Video.

In 2014, Orelsan and his Casseurs Flowters colleague Gringe were nominated for the Best French Act award at the 2014 MTV Europe Music Awards, their first nomination as a duo. However, they were lost to Indila during the ceremony held in Glasgow on 9 November 2014.

His third studio album La fête est finie was nominated for IMPALA's European Independent Album of the Year Award.

In February 2018, Orelsan won three awards at the 2018 Victoires de la Musique, one in the category of "Urban Album of the Year" for La fête est finie, one in the category of "Male Artist of the Year", and one in "Audiovisual Creation (Music Video of the Year)" for the music video of "Basique", one of the lead singles of the album.

In February 2019, Orelsan won the award of "Musical Show, Tour or Concert of the Year" for his tour at the 2019 Victoires de la Musique.

Since the release of his fourth studio album Civilisation in November 2021, Orelsan has won multiple awards. In February 2022, Orelsan won three awards at the 2022 Victoires de la Musique, one in the category of "Male Artist of the Year", one in the category of "Original Song of the Year" for the lead single L'odeur de l'essence, and one in the category of "Audiovisual Creation (Video of the Year)" for "Montre jamais ça à personne", a documentary about Orelsan directed by his younger brother, Clément Cotentin.

In November 2022, Orelsan won two awards at 2022 NRJ Music Award: Francophone Male Artist of the Year and Francophone Tour of the Year.

In February 2023, Orelsan won three awards at the 2023 Victoires de la Musique, one in the category of "Concert of the Year" for his Civilisation tour, one in the category of "Original Song of the Year" for the lead single "La Quête", and another one in the category of "Audiovisual Creation (Music Video of the Year)" for the music video of "La Quête". By 2023, Orelsan has won a total of twelve awards at Victoires de la Musique, surpassing French music legends Johnny Hallyday and Alain Souchon who had 10 trophies each.

== IMPALA European Independent Album of the Year Award ==
Year	Nominated work	Award	Result
2017	Independent Album of the Year	La fête est finie	Nominated

== Berlin Music Video Awards ==
Year	Nominated work	Award	Result
2019	Rêves bizarres	Best VFX	Nominated

== MTV Europe Music Awards ==
The MTV Europe Music Awards are an annual award ceremony that celebrate and honour the most popular songs and artists in Europe.

Year	Nominated work	Award	Result
2009	Orelsan	Best French Act	Won
2012	Orelsan	Best French Act	Nominated
2014	Casseurs Flowters (with Gringe)	Best French Act	Nominated

== NRJ Music Awards ==
The NRJ Music Awards (commonly abbreviated as a NMA) are an award ceremony presented by French radio station NRJ to honour the best in French and worldwide music industry.

Year	Nominated work	Award	Result
2013	Orelsan	French Revelation of the Year	Nominated
2018	"Basique"	Music Video of the Year	Nominated
2018	Orelsan	Francophone Male Artist of the Year	Nominated
2018	"La Pluie" - Orelsan et Stromae	Francophone Group/ Duo of the Year	Nominated
2022	"La Quête"	Music Video of the Year	Nominated
2022	Orelsan	Francophone Male Artist of the Year	Won
2022	Civilisation Tour	Francophone Tour of the Year	Won
2022	"Ensemble" - Orelsan et Skread	Francophone Collaboration of the Year	Nominated

== Prix Constantin ==
The Prix Constantin is an annual French music prize awarded to the best album of an artist who has come to prominence during the course of the past year.

Year	Nominated work	Award	Result
2009	Perdu d'avance	Prix Constantin	Nominated

== Prix de la Création Musicale ==
Year	Nominated work	Award	Result
2013	Orelsan	Songwriter of the Year	Won

== Trace Urban Music Awards ==
The TRACE Urban Music Awards are an annual award ceremony which recognises the best hip hop, tropical and African music artists.

Year	Nominated work	Award	Result
2013	Orelsan	Male Artist of the Year	Nominated
2013	Orelsan	Best Live Performance	Nominated
2013	"La terre est ronde"	Best Song	Nominated
2013	"Ils sont cools" (featuring Gringe)	Best Music Video	Nominated

== Victoires de la Musique ==
Victoires de la Musique is an annual French award ceremony where "Victoire" accolades are awarded by the French Ministry of Culture to recognize outstanding achievement in the music industry that recognizes the best musical artists of the year.

Year	Nominated work	Award	Result
2012	Orelsan	Group or Artist Popular Revelation of the Year	Won
2012	Le chant des sirènes	Urban Music Album of the Year	Won
2012	"RaelSan"	Music Video of the Year	Nominated
2013	Orelsan	Male Artist of the Year	Nominated
2018	"Basique"	Music Video of the Year	Won
2018	La fête est finie	Urban Music Album of the Year	Won
2018	Orelsan	Male Artist of the Year	Won
2019	Rêves bizarres	Song of the Year	Nominated
2019	Rêves bizarres	Video of the Year	Nominated
2019	Orelsan	Concert of the Year	Won
2022	Montre jamais ça à personne	Video of the Year	Won
2022	L'odeur de l'essence	Song of the Year	Won
2022	Orelsan	Male Artist	Won
2022	Civilisation	Album of the Year	Nominated
2023	La Quête	Music Video of the Year	Won
2023	La Quête	Song of the Year	Won
2023	Orelsan Civilisation Tour	Concert of the Year	Won
