= Trace Awards & Festival 2023 =

Music event in Kigali, Rwanda

- Date: 21 October 2023
- Location: Kigali, Rwanda
- Presented by: TRACE Media Group
- Hosted by: D'banj; Maria Borges

Highlights
- Most awards: Davido (2); Rema (2)
- Most nominations: Davido (4); Burna Boy (4)

Television/radio coverage
- Network: Trace Urban; Trace Africa; Trace Toca; Trace Tropical; Trace Mziki; Trace FM

To celebrate 20 years of promoting and supporting African and Afro-inspired music, Trace staged the 1st Trace Awards & Festival at the BK Arena in Kigali, Rwanda on 21 October 2023. The show was televised live to 350 million viewers and music fans around the world on Trace channels in 180 countries.

The nominees for the Awards were announced on 21 August 2023, with fans voting online.

Davido and Burna Boy led the nominations with four nominations each. Asake, Wizkid, Tiwa Savage, Ayra Starr, Yemi Alade, and Fireboy DML, all received three nominations each. Rema and Davido had the highest award winnings at the maiden edition by securing 2 awards each at the ceremony. The event hosts were D'banj and Maria Borges. The Trace Awards honors African outstanding achievements in African and Afro-inspired music and culture.

== Background ==
On 20 October 2023, Trace held a press conference at the Kigali Conference and Exhibition Village (KCEV), where the Head of Tourism and Conservation Department of Rwanda, Ariella Kageruka highlighted the benefits of the awards, and its impact on the nation. The awards ceremony was broadcast locally on Kigali Channel 2 (KC2 TV) in Rwanda, and internationally on Trace Urban, Trace Africa, Trace Gospel, Trace Toca, Trace Tropical, Trace Mziki, and Trace FM.

== Performers ==
On 6 September 2023, Trace confirmed the following performers:

- Davido
- Yemi Alade
- Kizz Daniel
- Asake
- Black Sherif
- Viviane Chidid
- Didi B
- Josey
- Benjamin Dube
- Blxckie
- Bruce Melodie
- Bwiza
- Dystinct
- Janet Otieno
- Kalash
- Soraia Ramos
- Lisandro Cuxi
- Locko
- Mikl
- Perola
- Plutonio
- Princess Lover
- Ronisia
- Rutshelle Guillaume
- Tayc
- Terell Elymoor
- Bamby
- The Compozers

== Nominees and winners ==
Below are listed nominees and winners. Winners are listed first in bold.

| Best Male | Best Female |
|---|---|
| **Davido** (Nigeria); Asake (Nigeria); Burna Boy (Nigeria); Diamond Platnumz (Tanzania); Didi B (Ivory Coast); K.O (South Africa); Rema (Nigeria) | **Viviane Chidid** (Senegal); Ayra Starr (Nigeria); Josey (Ivory Coast); Nadia Mukami (Kenya); Soraia Ramos (Cape Verde); Tiwa Savage (Nigeria) |
| Song of the Year | Best Music Video |
| **"Calm Down"** – Rema (Nigeria) & Selena Gomez (US); "BKBN" – Soraia Ramos (Cape Verde); "People" – Libianca (Cameroon); "Suavemente" – Soolking (France); "Encre" – Emma'a (Gabon); "Sugarcane" – Camidoh (Ghana); "Last Last" – Burna Boy (Nigeria); "Rush" – Ayra Starr (Nigeria); "Peru" – Fireboy DML (Nigeria) with Ed Sheeran (UK); "Sete" – K.O (South Africa); "Cough" – Kizz Daniel (Nigeria); MORTEL 06 – Innoss'B (Ivory Coast) | **"Baddie"** – Yemi Alade (Nigeria); "2 Sugar" – Wizkid (Nigeria) ft. Ayra Starr (Nigeria); "Kpaflotage" – Suspect 95 (Ivory Coast); "Loaded" – Tiwa Savage (Nigeria) & Asake (Nigeria); "Ronda" – Blxckie (South Africa); "Tombolo" – Kalash (Martinique); "Yatapita" – Diamond Platnumz (Tanzania) |
| Best Newcomer | Best Collaboration |
| **Roseline Layo** (Ivory Coast); Azawi (Uganda); Krys M (Cameroon); Libianca (Cameroon); Nissi Ogulu (Nigeria); Odumodublvck (Nigeria); Pabi Cooper (South Africa) | **"Unavailable"** – Davido (Nigeria) with Musa Keys (South Africa); "Many Ways" – BNXN (Nigeria) with Wizkid (Nigeria); "Mine" – Show Dem Camp (Nigeria) with Oxlade (Nigeria); "Peru" – Fireboy DML (Nigeria) with Ed Sheeran (UK); "Second Sermon" – Black Sherif (Ghana) with Burna Boy (Nigeria); "Sete" – K.O (South Africa) with Young Stunna (South Africa), Blxckie (South Africa); "Stamina" – Tiwa Savage (Nigeria) with Ayra Starr (Nigeria) & Young Jonn (Nigeria); "Trumpet" – Olamide (Nigeria) with CKay (Nigeria) |
| Best DJ | Best Producer |
| **Michael Brun** (Haiti); Danni Gato (Cape Verde); DJ BDK (Ivory Coast); DJ Illans (France); Spinall (Nigeria); Uncle Waffles (Swaziland) | **Tamsir** (Ivory Coast); DJ Maphorisa (South Africa); Juls (Ghana); Kabza de Small (South Africa); Kel-P (Nigeria) |
| Best Gospel Artist | Best Live |
| **KS Bloom** (Ivory Coast); Benjamin Dube (South Africa); Janet Otieno (Kenya); Levixone (Uganda); Moses Bliss (Nigeria) | **Fally Ipupa** (DRC); Burna Boy (Nigeria); Musa Keys (South Africa); The Compozers (Ghana); Wizkid (Nigeria); Yemi Alade (Nigeria) |
| Best Dancer | Best Artist Africa - Anglophone |
| **Robot Boii** (South Africa); Tayc (France); Ghetto Kids (Uganda); Yemi Alade (Nigeria); Zuchu (Tanzania) | **Asake** (Nigeria); Ayra Starr (Nigeria); Black Sherif (Ghana); Davido (Nigeria); Diamond Platnumz (Tanzania); Fireboy DML (Nigeria) |
| Best Artist Africa - Francophone | Best Artist Africa - Lusophone |
| **Didi B** (Ivory Coast); Emma'a (Gabon); Fally Ipupa (DRC); Ko-c (Cameroon); Locko (Cameroon); Serge Beynaud (Ivory Coast); Viviane Chidid (Senegal) | **Lisandro Cuxi** (Cape Verde); Gerilson Insrael (Angola); Pérola (Angola); Plutonio (Mozambique); Soraia Ramos (Cape Verde) |
| Best Artist - Rwanda | Best Artist - East Africa |
| **Bruce Melodie** (Rwanda); Ariel Wayz (Rwanda); Bwiza (Rwanda); Chriss Eazy (Rwanda); Kenny Sol (Rwanda) | **Diamond Platnumz** (Tanzania); Bruce Melodie (Rwanda); Zuchu (Tanzania); Khaligraph Jones (Kenya); Nadia Mukani (Kenya); Azawi (Uganda) |
| Best Artist - France & Belgium | Best Artist - UK |
| **Tayc** (France); Aya Nakamura (France); Booba (France); Nihno (France); Ronisia (France); Soolking (France) | **Central Cee** (UK); Headie One (UK); Ms Banks (UK); Raye (UK); Stormzy (UK) |
| Best Artist - The Caribbean | Best Artist - Indian Ocean |
| **Rutshelle Guillaume** (Haiti); Admiral T (Guadeloupe); Bamby (French Guiana); Kalash (Martinique); Maureen (Martinique); Popcaan (Jamaica); Princess Lover (Martinique); Shenseea (Jamaica) | **Goulam** (Comoros); Donovan BTS (Mauritius); GaEi (Madagascar); Mikl (Reunion); Sega el (Reunion); Terell Elymoor (Mayotte) |
| Best Artist - Brazil | Best Artist - North Africa |
| **Ludmilla** (Brazil); Djonga (Brazil); Iza (Brazil); Léo Santana (Brazil); Luedji Luna (Brazil) | **Dystinct** (Morocco); Amira Zouhair (Morocco); Artmasta (Tunisia); ElGrandeToto (Morocco); Kader Japonais (Algeria); Raja Meziane (Algeria) |
| Album of the Year | ChangeMaker |
| **Love, Damini** – Burna Boy (Nigeria); DNK – Aya Nakamura (France); Maverick – Kizz Daniel (Nigeria); More Love, Less Ego – Wizkid (Nigeria); Timeless – Davido (Nigeria); Work of Art – Asake (Nigeria) | **Mr Eazi** (Nigeria) |
