= La quête =

Single by Orelsan

from the album Civilisation
- Released: 3 March 2022
- Genre: Pop; lo-fi
- Length: 4:04
- Label: 7th Magnitude; 3eme Bureau
- Songwriters: Aurélien Cotentin; Matthieu Le Carpentier
- Producer: Skread

Orelsan singles chronology
"Jour meilleur" (2021)	"La quête" (2022)	"Du propre" (2022)

Music video
- "La quête" on YouTube

"La quête" (French pronunciation: [la kɛt]) is a song by French rapper and singer-songwriter Orelsan. The song peaked at number 2 on the French Singles Chart and at number 10 on the Belgian Ultratop Wallonia Chart.

== Charts ==
Chart (2022)	Peak position
Belgium (Ultratop 50 Wallonia)	6
France (SNEP)	2
Switzerland (Schweizer Hitparade)	20

== Certifications ==
Region	Certification	Certified units/sales
France (SNEP)	Diamond	333,333^{‡}
^{‡} Sales+streaming figures based on certification alone.
