= Ensemble (song) =

Single by Orelsan featuring Skread

from the album Civilisation
- Released: 13 July 2022
- Genre: Synth-pop; R&B
- Length: 4:43
- Label: 7th Magnitude; 3eme Bureau
- Songwriters: Aurélien Cotentin; Matthieu Le Carpentier
- Producer: Skread

Orelsan singles chronology
"Du propre" (2022)	"Ensemble" (2022)	"CP_009_ Évidemment" (2022)

Skread singles chronology
"Ensemble" (2021)	"Gra Gra Boom" (2022)

Music video
- "Ensemble" on YouTube

"Ensemble" is a song by French rapper and singer-songwriter Orelsan featuring French hip hop record producer Skread. The song peaked at number 15 on the French Singles Chart.

== Charts ==
Chart (2022)	Peak position
France (SNEP)	15

== Certifications ==
Region	Certification	Certified units/sales
France (SNEP)	Gold	100,000^{‡}
^{‡} Sales+streaming figures based on certification alone.
