= Comment c'est loin (soundtrack) =

Comment c'est loin: L'album du film

Soundtrack album by Casseurs Flowters
- Released: 9 December 2015
- Recorded: 2014–2015
- Genre: French hip hop; alternative hip hop; comedy hip hop
- Length: 53:30
- Language: French
- Label: 3^{e} Bureau; 7th Magnitude; Wagram
- Producer: Orelsan; Skread

Casseurs Flowters chronology
Orelsan et Gringe sont les Casseurs Flowters (2013)	Comment c'est loin: L'album du film (2015)

Orelsan chronology
Orelsan et Gringe sont les Casseurs Flowters (2013)	Comment c'est loin (2015)	La fête est finie (2017)

Gringe chronology
Orelsan et Gringe sont les Casseurs Flowters (2013)	Comment c'est loin (2015)	Enfant lune (2018)

Singles from Comment c'est loin: L'album du film
- 1. "À l'heure où je me couche" Released: 29 October 2015

Comment c'est loin: L'album du film is the second studio album by Casseurs Flowters, a French hip hop duo consisting of rappers Orelsan and Gringe, and the soundtrack album for their eponymous 2015 film. It was released on 9 December 2015 by 3^{e} Bureau, 7th Magnitude and Wagram Music in France.

The album entered the French Albums Chart on 30 November 2015, just over a week before its release, charting at number 78 and peaking at number 24. The album has received generally positive reviews from music critics, and was certified platinum in France in January 2017.

== Background ==
On 23 September 2014, in an interview with Melty, Orelsan attempted to explain the success of his and Gringe's debut studio album as a duo, Orelsan et Gringe sont les Casseurs Flowters, stating: "It's an album that kind of talks about everyday life, and which speaks to regular people in our age group." When asked about the possibility of a third solo studio album (following Le chant des sirènes from 2011), he admitted that it was something that he had "not started doing", though he promised to "get on it quickly".

On 21 March 2015, Orelsan posted a photo of a script with the working title Orel et Gringe (Orel and Gringe) on his Instagram page. He followed up with another post on 4 May, this time of himself with Gringe in the film, confirming that shooting for the film was complete and that its title would be Comment c'est loin.

== Singles ==
Comment c'est loin: L'album du film has produced 1 single:

- "À l'heure où je me couche" was released as the album's lead single on 29 October 2015. It peaked at number 34 on the French Singles Chart.

== Track listing ==
No.	Title	Artist(s)	Length
1.	"Nouvelle journée"	Skread	1:44
2.	"Au bout du compte"	Akhenaton; Wiley	2:58
3.	"À l'heure où je me couche"	Casseurs Flowters	3:40
4.	"Quand ton père t'engueule"	Orelsan	3:29
5.	"En boucle"	Casseurs Flowters	3:56
6.	"Faut qu'on rentre bosser"	Skread	1:42
7.	"Freestyle Radio Phoenix"	Casseurs Flowters	4:12
8.	"Le mal est fait"	Gringe	3:06
9.	"C'est toujours 2 connards dans un abribus"	Casseurs Flowters	2:37
10.	"Pas n'importe quel toon"	Casseurs Flowters	3:39
11.	"J'essaye, j'essaye"	Orelsan	3:53
12.	"Promenade imprévue"	Skread	1:30
13.	"Xavier"	Diamond Deuklo	3:47
14.	"Wondercash"	Casseurs Flowters	1:18
15.	"On est resté à l'hôtel"	Skread	1:37
16.	"Si facile"	Casseurs Flowters	3:56
17.	"Inachevés"	Casseurs Flowters	3:35
18.	"Quand on descend vers le centre"	Skread	2:54
Total length:			53:30

Notes

- "J'essaye, j'essaye" features additional vocals by Janine.

Sample credits

- "Au bout du compte" contains samples of "Snakes & Ladders (Part Two)" by Wiley.

== Charts ==
=== Weekly charts ===
Chart (2015–2016)	Peak position
Belgian Albums (Ultratop Wallonia)	57
French Albums (SNEP)	24
Swiss Albums (Schweizer Hitparade)	83

=== Year-end charts ===
Chart (2016)	Position
Belgian Albums (Ultratop Wallonia)	150
French Albums (SNEP)	71

== Certifications ==
Region	Certification	Certified units/sales
France (SNEP)	Platinum	100,000^{‡}
^{‡} Sales+streaming figures based on certification alone.

== Release history ==
Country	Date	Format	Label
France	9 December 2015	Digital download	3^{e} Bureau; 7th Magnitude; Wagram
France	11 December 2015	CD	3^{e} Bureau; 7th Magnitude; Wagram
United States	9 December 2015	Digital download	3^{e} Bureau; 7th Magnitude; Wagram
