= Jour meilleur =

Single by Orelsan

from the album Civilisation
- Released: 19 November 2021
- Genre: Pop; emo rap; lo-fi; (original version); Trance (Lost Frequencies remix)
- Length: 4:04
- Label: 7th Magnitude; 3eme Bureau
- Songwriters: Aurélien Cotentin; Matthieu Le Carpentier
- Producer: Skread

Orelsan singles chronology
"L'odeur de l'essence" (2021)	"Jour meilleur" (2021)	"La quête" (2022)

Music video
- "Jour meilleur" on YouTube

Remix cover

"Jour meilleur" is a song by French rapper and singer-songwriter Orelsan. The song peaked at number 1 on the French Singles Chart. In July 2023, Belgian DJ Lost Frequencies released a remix of the song.

== Charts ==
Chart (2021)	Peak position
France (SNEP)	1

== Certifications ==
Region	Certification	Certified units/sales
France (SNEP)	Diamond	333,333^{‡}
^{‡} Sales+streaming figures based on certification alone.
