= RaelSan =

Single by Orelsan

from the album Le chant des sirènes
- Released: 30 May 2011
- Recorded: 2011
- Genre: French hip hop, horrorcore
- Length: 4:12
- Label: 7th Magnitude, Wagram
- Songwriters: Aurélien Cotentin, Matthieu Le Carpentier
- Producer: Skread

Orelsan singles chronology
"Changement" (2008)	"RaelSan" (2011)	"Double vie" (2011)

Audio sample
- "RaelSan": file; help

Music video
- "RaelSan" on YouTube

"RaelSan" is a song by French rapper Orelsan, and produced by Skread. It was released on May 30, 2011, as the first single from his second studio album Le chant des sirènes, and peaked at number 77 on the French Singles Chart.

The song's name is a reference to Raël, the founder of Raëlism, and is a portmanteau of Raël and Orelsan.

== Music video ==
Orelsan as "RaelSan" in the music video.

The music video was released on 24 August 2011 on YouTube. In the video, Orelsan takes the role of "RaelSan" and is seen wearing a black mask similar to that of Robin of DC Comics, rapping to the song in constantly changing clips, all in which he is seen wearing the same outfit. 2 minutes into the video, while still rapping, Orelsan shapeshifts into Skread, Ablaye (the founders of the record label 7th Magnitude to which Orelsan is signed) and then Gringe, all of whom are still wearing the same outfit as Orelsan and still rapping, then shapeshifts back to himself, after which the three men split off Orelsan and all four make the same body gestures, before the video continues with Orelsan alone.

The video was nominated for Music Video of the Year at the 2012 Victoires de la Musique awards.

== Influence ==
Since the release of the "RaelSan" music video, Orelsan adopted RaelSan as his alter ego and has performed under this character in several concerts since. RaelSan is portrayed as an alien life form with superpowers.

Orelsan released two end-of-the-year videos as RaelSan, titled "Les vœux de RaelSan pour 2012" ("RaelSan's Wishes for 2012") with Marek Tomaszewski on 31 December 2011, and "Les adieux de RaelSan avant l'Apocalypse" ("RaelSan's farewell before the Apocalypse") with Gringe, Skread, Ablaye, Manu Dyens, Eddy Purple and Dany Synthé on 21 December 2012, both directed by David Tomaszewski. In "Les adieux de RaelSan avant l'Apocalypse", RaelSan answers a question from a fan asking whether he is friends with Orelsinge, to which he replies by saying that they met at a Doors concert in 1994 before performing a fusion technique to form "Raelsinge".

== Track listing ==
- Digital download
1. "RaelSan" – 4:12

== Chart performance ==
Chart (2011)	Peak position
France (SNEP)	77
