= Trace Awards & Festival =

French pay-TV music awards show

Trace Awards & Summit
- Current: Trace Awards & Summit 2025
- Awarded for: Outstanding Achievement in African and Afro-inspired music and culture
- Country: France
- Presented by: Trace TV
- First award: October 21, 2023
- Website: Official website

Radio/television coverage
- Network: Trace TV; Trace Africa

Trace Awards & Summit (also referred to as Trace Awards) is a music awards show established by Trace Group to celebrate the 20th anniversary of the French pay-TV music video television channel Trace TV. With the aim of honoring outstanding achievements in African and Afro-inspired music and culture around the world, the Trace Awards was broadcast live on Trace TV and Trace Africa across 180 countries. The first edition was held in Kigali, Rwanda, on Saturday 21 October 2023 at the BK Arena, Kigali.

== History ==
The event is composed of performances from African and Afro-origin artists from around the world plus presentations of awards in 26 different categories. The inaugural edition also aired on Kigali Channel 2 (KC2 TV) in Rwanda for local viewing, and the show was also livestreamed on the Trace YouTube channel.

On 20 October 2023, Trace held a press conference at Kigali Conference and Exhibition Village, where the head of the Tourism and Conservation Department of Rwanda, Ariella Kageruka, highlighted the benefits of the award and its impact on the nation. The event was hosted by Nigerian singer D'banj and Angolan model Maria Borges.

In 2025, the Trace Awards are back with a two days summit prior to the Award Ceremony. The Trace Awards will transform Zanzibar into a vibrant epicenter of music, culture, and innovation. Hosted at the luxurious Mora Zanzibar resort, the Awards will showcase 28 categories of the most popular African music genres and artists, with live broadcasts in over 200 countries in English, French, and Portuguese. The event will air across 25 Trace African and international channels, as well as more than 50 terrestrial, satellite, and streaming partners, reaching an estimated audience of at least 500 million fans. The list of nominees will be revealed on December 4th 2024. The public vote for the winners will start on the 18th December 2024

== Ceremonies ==
#	Date	Venue	Host city	Host
1st	21 October 2023	BK Arena	Kigali, Rwanda	D'banj and Maria Borges
2nd	24-26 February 2025	The Mora	Zanzibar, Tanzania	

== Award categories (26) ==
The following are the present categories:

- Best Male
- Best Female
- Song of the Year
- Best Music Video
- Best Newcomer
- Best Collaboration
- Best DJ
- Best Producer
- Best Gospel Artist
- Best Live
- Best Dancer
- Best Artist Africa - Anglophone
- Best Artist Africa - Francophone
- Best Artist Africa - Lusophone
- Best Artist - Rwanda
- Best Artist - East Africa
- Best Artist - France & Belgium
- Best Artist - UK
- Best Artist - The Caribbean
- Best Artist - Indian Ocean
- Best Artist - Brazil
- Best Artist - North Africa
- Album of the Year
- Lifetime Achievement
- Changemaker
- Global African Act
