= La fête est finie =

Studio album by Orelsan
- Released: 20 October 2017
- Genre: French hip hop
- Length: 50:03
- Language: French
- Label: 7th Magnitude; 3^{e} Bureau; Wagram
- Producer: Édouard Ardan; Guillaume Brière; Manu Dyens; Colette Magny; Orelsan; Phazz; Skip Sounds; Skread; Stromae; Martin Tigvall

Orelsan chronology
Comment c'est loin (2015)	La fête est finie (2017)	Civilisation (2021)

Singles from La fête est finie
- 1. "Basique" Released: 21 September 2017; 2. "Tout va bien" Released: 15 November 2017; 3. "La pluie" Released: 23 February 2018; 4. "Défaite de famille" Released: 28 February 2018; 5. "Paradis" Released: 8 October 2018

La fête est finie - Épilogue
- Re-release cover

La fête est finie (pronounced [la fɛte fini]; English: The Party is Over) is the third studio album by French rapper Orelsan, released on 20 October 2017 by 7th Magnitude, 3^{e} Bureau and Wagram Music. It was his first solo album in over six years, having worked on two studio albums with Casseurs Flowters after releasing his second studio album Le chant des sirènes in September 2011. A re-release of the album with 11 additional tracks, entitled La fête est finie - Épilogue, was released on 15 November 2018.

Entering the French Albums Chart at number 1 and remaining at number 1 for three consecutive weeks, the album has received positive reviews from music critics and was certified platinum in France only one week after its release. In January 2023, the album has been certified double diamond by the SNEP, with over one million copies sold in France.

== Singles ==
La fête est finie has produced one lead single:

- "Basique" was released as the lead single on 21 September 2017. It entered the French Singles Chart at number 31 on 23 September 2017, peaking at number 9.

== Reception ==
=== Critical reception ===
French publication Le Parisien called La fête est finie the album of the year, “an electroshock that leaves the competition far behind”.

NRJ called the album “a winning hit” and “Orelsan’s big comeback”, reporting that “With his third album, Orelsan thrilled not only the public, but also the critics. Written press, radio, TV all reacted… 'Brilliant' from Marianne (October 2017), 'Album of the year' from Le Parisien (November 2017) or even 'A gem' from Le Point (November 2017), all are unanimous to say that La fête est finie is a success.”

=== Commercial performance ===
La fête est finie has achieved enormous commercial success: it entered the French Albums Chart in first place on 28 October 2017, eight days after its release. By this time, the album had been certified gold in France with over 50,000 copies sold in just three days. By the end of its first week, the album had been certified platinum in France, with sales reportedly standing at 96,974 copies (streaming included) seven days after release. Within eight months of release, the album was certified diamond (over 500,000 copies sold in France) by the SNEP. In January 2023, the album reached a new milestone in terms of impressive sales record: it has been certified double diamond by the SNEP with over one million copies sold in France.

== Track listing ==
Credits adapted from Tidal.

No.	Title	Producer(s)	Length
1.	"San"	Skread	4:02
2.	"La fête est finie"	Skread	3:03
3.	"Basique"	Skread	2:43
4.	"Tout va bien"	Skread; Stromae	2:29
5.	"Défaite de famille"	Skread; Phazz	3:43
6.	"La lumière"	Skread; Phazz	3:13
7.	"Bonne meuf"	Orelsan	2:03
8.	"Quand est-ce que ça s'arrête ?"	Skread; Guillaume Brière	2:57
9.	"Christophe" (featuring Maître Gims)	Skread; Phazz	2:46
10.	"Zone" (featuring Nekfeu and Dizzee Rascal)	Skread	4:46
11.	"Dans ma ville, on traîne"	Skread; Phazz	4:00
12.	"La pluie" (featuring Stromae)	Stromae	2:55
13.	"Paradis"	Guillaume Brière	3:49
14.	"Notes pour trop tard" (featuring Ibeyi)	Skread	7:34
Total length:			50:03

La fête est finie - Épilogue (Additional tracks)
No.	Title	Producer(s)	Length
1.	"Fantômes"	Martin Tigvall; Phazz; Skip Sounds	2:38
2.	"Tout ce que je sais" (featuring YBN Cordae)	Skread	2:57
3.	"La famille, la famille"	Skread	3:31
4.	"Mes grands-parents"	Colette Magny	2:36
5.	"Tout va bien (Remix)" (featuring Eugy and Kojo Funds)	Skread; Stromae	2:29
6.	"Discipline"	Skread	2:46
7.	"Adieu les filles"	Édouard Ardan; Manu Dyens; Phazz; Orelsan	1:46
8.	"Excuses ou mensonges"	Phazz	3:02
9.	"Dis-moi"	Skread; Phazz	3:18
10.	"Rêves bizarres" (featuring Damso)	Skread	3:32
11.	"Épilogue"	Skread	4:51
Total length:			33:26

== Charts ==
=== Weekly charts ===
Chart (2017)	Peak position
Belgian Albums (Ultratop Flanders)	36
Belgian Albums (Ultratop Wallonia)	1
French Albums (SNEP)	1
Swiss Albums (Schweizer Hitparade)	2

=== Year-end charts ===
Chart (2017)	Position
Belgian Albums (Ultratop Wallonia)	14
French Albums (SNEP)	6
Swiss Albums (Schweizer Hitparade)	92

Chart (2018)	Position
Belgian Albums (Ultratop Wallonia)	7
French Albums (SNEP)	4

Chart (2019)	Position
Belgian Albums (Ultratop Wallonia)	29

Chart (2020)	Position
Belgian Albums (Ultratop Wallonia)	43

Chart (2025)	Position
Belgian Albums (Ultratop Wallonia)	93

== Certifications ==
Region	Certification	Certified units/sales
Belgium (BRMA)	Gold	10,000^{‡}
France (SNEP)	2× Diamond	1,000,000^{‡}
^{‡} Sales+streaming figures based on certification alone.
