= No Life =

No Life may refer to:

- "No Life" (Slipknot song), a song by American metal band Slipknot from their self-titled debut studio album
- "No Life" (Orelsan song), a song by French rapper Orelsan from his debut studio album Perdu d'avance
- "No Life" (Nessbeal song), a song by French rapper Nessbeal from his mixtape RSC Sessions Perdues, featuring Orelsan

== See also ==
- Nolife (TV channel)
