= Du propre =

Single by Orelsan

from the album Civilisation
- Released: 16 July 2022
- Genre: French hip hop
- Length: 3:47
- Label: 7th Magnitude; 3eme Bureau
- Songwriters: Aurélien Cotentin; Matthieu Le Carpentier
- Producer: Skread

Orelsan singles chronology
"La quête" (2022)	"Du propre" (2022)	"Ensemble" (2022)

Music video
- "Du propre" on YouTube

"Du propre" is a song by French rapper and singer-songwriter Orelsan. The song peaked at number 3 on the French Singles Chart.

== Charts ==
Chart (2022)	Peak position
France (SNEP)	3

== Certifications ==
Region	Certification	Certified units/sales
France (SNEP)	Diamond	333,333^{‡}
^{‡} Sales+streaming figures based on certification alone.
