= Marek i Wacek =

Polish musical duo

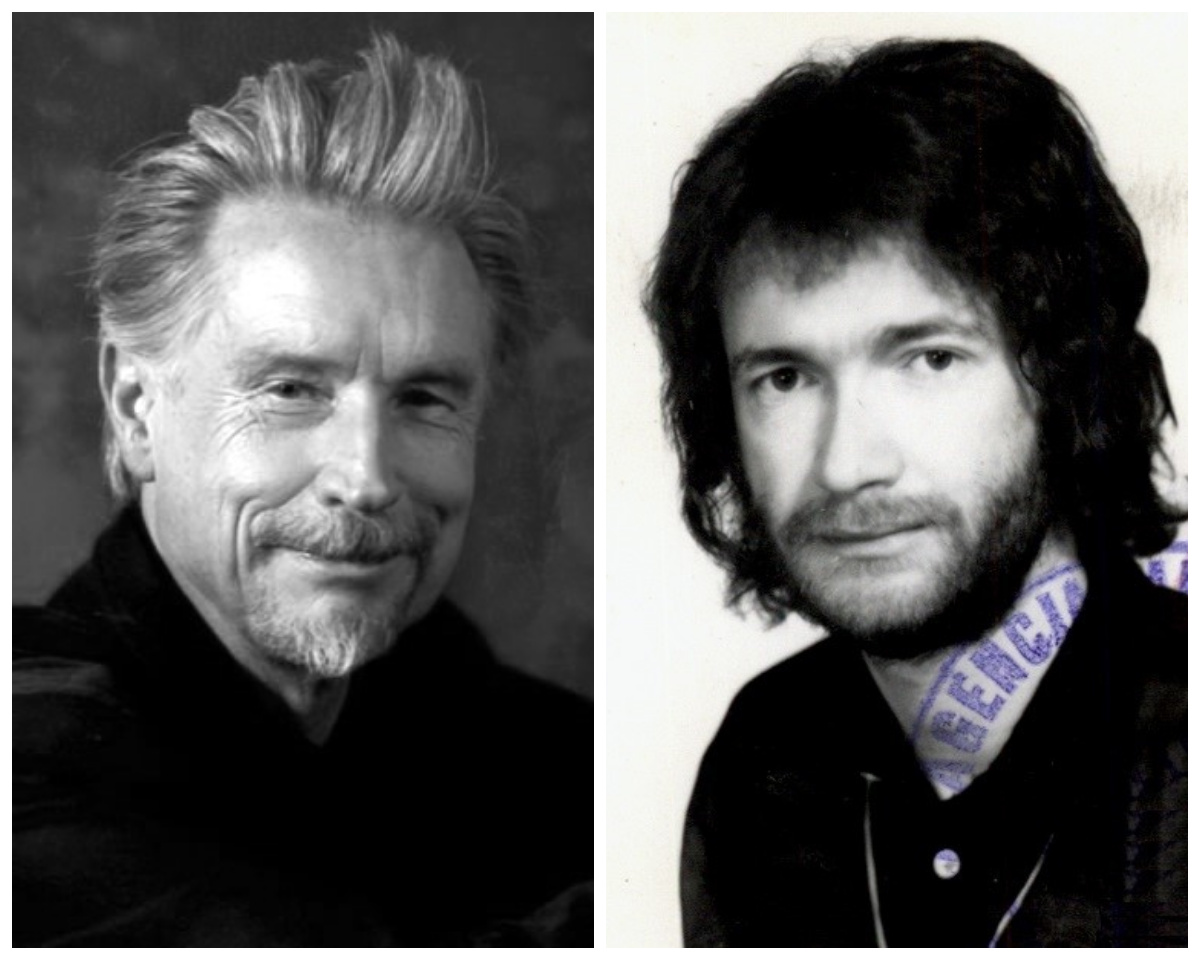
- Marek and Wacek

Background information
- Also known as: Marek and Wacek; Marek and Vacek; Marek und Vacek; Kisielewski i Tomaszewski
- Origin: Poland
- Genres: Classical, jazz
- Years active: 1963–1986
- Labels: Pronit, Polydor, Electrola, Wifon, Veriton, Prisma, Intercord, Muza
- Past members: Marek Tomaszewski; Wacław Kisielewski (deceased)

Marek i Wacek (Marek and Wacek) was a musical duo of Polish pianists Marek Tomaszewski and Wacław "Wacek" Kisielewski, that performed from 1963 until Wacek's death on 12 July 1986. Formed in early 1960s, the duo debuted in a TV program on March 8, 1963.

The duo transformed classical compositions into modern sound and vice versa, converted modern music into classical style. Their approact to music was influenced by Vacek's father, Stefan Kisielewski, writer, publicist, and composer.

Marek and Wacek played the principal roles (themselves) in the 1966 musical short film Tandem.

== Discography ==
=== Long plays ===
- 1966 – Ballade pour deux pianos (Barclay)
- 1967 – Kisielewski - Tomaszewski: Play Favourite Melodies (Pronit; CD re-release by Muza in 1994)
- 1968
  - Marek & Vacek: Piano Firework (Polydor)
  - Marek & Vacek: Romantische Flügel (Polydor)
  - Marek & Vacek: Träumerei (Polydor)
- 1969
  - Marek & Vacek: Piano Fascination (Polydor)
  - Marek & Vacek: Piano Firework, Vol. 1-2 (Polydor)
- 1970 – Marek & Vacek: Classical and Pop Pianos (Polydor)
- 1971 – Marek & Vacek: Stargala, Vol. 1-2 (Polydor)
- 1972 – Marek & Vacek: Concert Hits (Electrola)
- 1973
  - Marek & Vacek: Concert Hits II (Electrola)
  - Marek & Vacek: Concert Hits, Vol. 1-2 (Electrola)
- 1974 – Marek und Vacek Live: Vol. 1-2 (Electrola)
- 1976 – Marek und Vacek: Spectrum (Electrola)
- 1977 – Marek & Vacek: Wiener Walzer (Electrola)
- 1978 – Marek und Vacek: Das Programm (Polydor)
- 1979
  - Marek und Vacek, Vol. 1-2 (Polydor)
  - Marek & Vacek Live (Wifon)
- 1980 – Marek & Vacek: Mondscheinsonate (Polydor)
- 1981
  - Marek i Wacek grają utwory romantyczne (Veriton)
  - Marek und Vacek in Gold (Polydor)
- 1982 – Die Marek und Vacek Story 1962-1982, Vol. 1-2 (Prisma)
- 1984
  - Marek und Vacek '84 (Intercord)
  - Marek i Vacek (Wifon)
  - Marek und Vacek: Welterfolge (Intercord)
  - Marek and Vacek: Again (Pronit)
- 1987 – Marek & Vacek: The Last Concert, Vol. 1-2 (Pronit)

=== Compact discs ===
- 1994 – Kisielewski - Tomaszewski: Play Favourite Melodies (Muza)
- 2001 – Niepokonani: Marek & Vacek Live (Polskie Radio/Universal Music Polska)
- 2002 – Prząśniczka (Pomaton/EMI)
