= Gunshot (disambiguation) =

A gunshot is the discharge of a firearm, producing a mechanical sound effect and a chemical gunshot residue.

Gunshot or gun shot may also refer to:

- Gunshot (band), a British hip hop group
- Gunshot (film), a 1996 Telugu film directed by S. V. Krishna Reddy starring Ali, Prakash Raj and Keerthi Reddy
- "Gunshot", a 2011 song by Nessbeal from Sélection naturelle
- "Gunshot", a 2014 song by Lykke Li from I Never Learn
- "Gun Shot", a 2012 song by Nicki Minaj from Pink Friday: Roman Reloaded
- "Gunshots", a 2016 song by Blank Banshee from MEGA
- "Gunshot", a 2020 song by Kard from Way With Words

== See also ==
- Gunshot wound
- Gunshot residue (GSR), also known as cartridge discharge residue (CDR), or firearm discharge residue (FDR)
- Gunshot suicide
