= The Compozers =

British-Ghanaian music band

- Origin: London, England
- Genres: Afro fusion; Afrobeats
- Years active: 2013–present
- Labels: MOVES Recordings; GO TIME RECORDS
- Members: C Biggz; Nana "Pokes"; David Melodee; Drummerboy
- Website: www.compozers.co.uk

The Compozers is a British-Ghanaian music band formed in London in 2013.

== Career ==
Initially, they were friends, unaware that they would eventually form a musical ensemble. They were born and raised in the same area in North London. The Compozers began as friends playing music together in their local church before officially forming as a band in 2013. They have since become highly sought-after collaborators for major artists such as pioneer BET Hiphop Best International Flow award winner, Sarkodie, Wizkid, Davido, Burna Boy, Stormzy, Tiwa Savage, Ed Sheeran, Central Cee, and many others, performing at iconic venues worldwide (such as the Royal Albert Hall, Roundhouse, Brixton O2 Academy, Madison Square Garden, Barclays Center) and earning a reputation as pioneers in modern Afro-fusion and live music.

== Members ==
=== Current members ===
- C Biggz, real name Charlie Mensah-Bonsu, keyboardist
- Nana "Pokes", real name Nana Ntorinkansah, bassist
- David Melodee real name David Ohene-Akrasi, keyboardist
- Drummerboy, real name Stephen Asamoah-Duah, drummer

== Discography ==
=== Live EP ===
- "KSB (Always on My Mind)" (Rai-Elle feat. The Compozers) (2019)

=== Singles ===
- "Born You Well" (2018)
- "Slow Down - Acoustic Session" (King Promise feat. The Compozers) (2021)
- "Ambush × The Compozers : GRM Radio" (Ambush Buzzworl, The Compozers, GRM Daily) (2024)
- "All Night Long" (The Compozers feat. ShineTTW & Aema) (2024)

=== Other songs ===
- "OT Bop (Rock Version)" (NSG feat. The Compozers) (2023)
- "So Low" (Joshua Baraka feat. The Compozers) (2025)
- "WAW" (Samba Peuzzi feat. Khaligraph Jones, The Compozers) (2026)

== Awards and nominations ==
Ghana Music Awards UK

Year	Nominated work	Award	Result
2018	The Compozers	Special Recognition Award	Won

UK Entertainment Awards

Year	Nominated work	Award	Result
2019	The Compozers	Best musician	Won

Trace Awards

Year	Nominated work	Award	Result
2023	The Compozers	Best live	Nominated

Emy Africa Awards

Year	Nominated work	Award	Result
2025	The Compozers	Group of the Year	Won
