= Plus rien ne m'étonne =

Single by Orelsan

from the album Le chant des sirènes
- Released: 25 July 2011
- Recorded: 2011
- Genre: French hip hop, conscious hip hop, chiptune
- Length: 3:36
- Label: 7th Magnitude, Wagram
- Songwriter(s): Aurélien Cotentin, Matthieu Le Carpentier
- Producer(s): Skread

Orelsan singles chronology
"Double vie" (2011)	"Plus rien ne m'étonne" (2011)	"Suicide social" (2011)

Audio sample
- "Plus rien ne m'étonne": file; help

Music video
- "Plus rien ne m'étonne" on YouTube

"Plus rien ne m'étonne" is a song by French rapper Orelsan and produced by Skread. It was released on July 25, 2011 as the third single from his second studio album Le chant des sirènes, and features uncredited vocals by Isleym.

== Music video ==
Directed by David Tomaszewski, the music video was released on 26 September 2011 on YouTube. In the video, Orelsan begins jogging in tandem with a game on his iPhone featuring a plump purple rabbit, and uses the app to buy various vehicles which then spawn in real life to enable him to travel faster. His first vehicle is a skateboard, and as the video progresses he uses bigger and faster vehicles, and by the end of the video he makes a Chevrolet Camaro explode by driving it too fast, throwing him into the air and partly burning himself and most of his clothes. Tired and seriously injured, Orelsan then decides to walk back to his home in Caen, which is 542 kilometres away according to the road sign he looks at behind him.

== Track listing ==
- Digital download
1. "Plus rien ne m'étonne" – 3:36

== Chart performance ==
Chart (2011)	Peak position
France (SNEP)	46
