= Double vie =

Double vie may refer to:

== Books ==
- Double vie, 2001 novel by Pierre Assouline, winner of the 2001 Prix des libraires
- La Double Vie, audiobook memoirs of Jean-Roger Caussimon

== Music ==
- Double vie, 1988 live album by French singer Alain Chamfort
- "Double vie" (Orelsan song), single from the 2011 album Le chant des sirènes by French rapper Orelsan
