= Wacław Kisielewski =

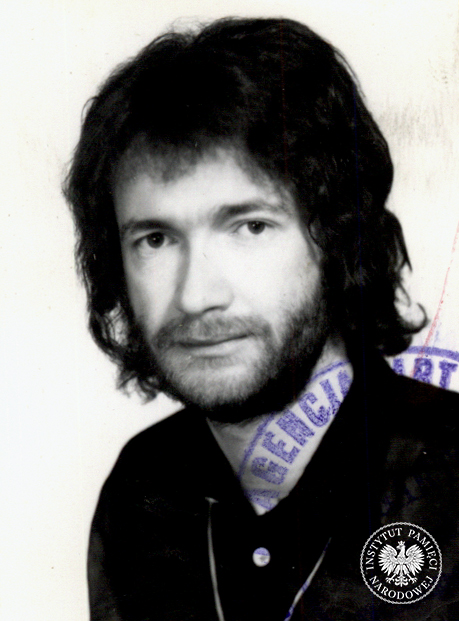
- Kisielewski's grave in Warsaw

Background information
- Born: Wacław Kisielewski; 12 February 1943; Warsaw, General Government
- Died: 12 July 1986 (aged 43) Wyszków, Poland
- Genres: Classical, jazz
- Occupation: Pianist
- Instrument: Piano
- Years active: 1963–1986
- Formerly of: Marek and Wacek, Marek Tomaszewski

Wacław "Wacek" Kisielewski (12 February 1943 – 12 July 1986) was a Polish pianist. He was the son of Polish prose writer, publicist, composer, music critic, teacher, and politician Stefan Kisielewski, and one half of the pianist duo Marek i Wacek (Marek and Wacek) with Marek Tomaszewski. He made arrangements of classical and modern music, and played concerts in many countries worldwide.

Waclaw died in a car accident in Wyszków and was buried in the Powązki Cemetery in Warsaw on 17 July 1986. The funeral mass in the Church of Saint Cross Piaseczno was attended by a huge crowd. The representatives of EMI and Yamaha were present, among others.

== Discography ==
=== With Marek and Wacek ===
==== Long plays ====
- 1966 – Ballade pour deux pianos Barclay
- 1968
  - Kisielewski-Tomaszewski: Play Favourite Melodies (Pronit; CD re-release by Muza in 1994)
  - Marek & Vacek: Piano Firework (Polydor)
  - Marek & Vacek: Romanische Figel (Polydor)
  - Marek & Vacek: Trumerei (Polydor)
- 1969
  - Marek & Vacek: Piano Fascination (Polydor)
  - Marek & Vacek: Piano Firework, Vol. 1-2 (Polydor)
- 1970 – Marek & Vacek: Classical and Pop Pianos (Polydor)
- 1971 – Marek & Vacek: Stargala, Vol. 1-2 (Polydor)
- 1972 – Marek & Vacek: Concert Hits (Electrola)
- 1973
  - Marek & Vacek: Concert Hits II (Electrola)
  - Marek & Vacek: Concert Hits, Vol. 1-2 (Electrola)
- 1974 – Marek und Vacek Live: Vol. 1-2 (Electrola)
- 1976 – Marek und Vacek: Spectrum (Electrola)
- 1977 – Marek & Vacek: Wiener Walzer (Electrola)
- 1978 – Marek und Vacek: Das Programm (Polydor)
- 1979
  - Marek und Vacek, Vol. 1-2 (Polydor)
  - Marek & Vacek Live (Wifon)
- 1980 – Marek & Vacek: Mondscheinsonate (Polydor)
- 1981
  - Marek i wacek grają utwory romantyczne (Veriton)
  - Marek und Vacek in Gold (Polydor)
- 1982 – Die Marek und Vacek Story 1962-1982, Vol. 1-2 (Prisma)
- 1984
  - Marek und Vacek '84 (Intercord)
  - Marek i Vacek (Wifon)
  - Marek und Vacek: Welterfolge (Intercord)
  - Marek and Vacek: Again (Pronit)
- 1987 – Marek & Vacek: The Last Concert, Vol. 1-2 (Pronit)

==== Compact discs ====
- 1994 – Kisielewski - Tomaszewski: Play Favourite Melodies (Muza)
- 2001 – Niepokonani: Marek & Vacek Live (Polskie Radio/Universal Music Polska)
- 2002 – Prząśniczka (Pomaton/EMI)

== Filmography ==
=== Film ===
Year	Title	Role	Notes
1973	Pariser Nächte	Himself (with Marek Tomaszewski as Marek und Vacek)	

=== Television ===
Year	Title	Role	Notes
1971	Drei mal neun	Himself (with Marek Tomaszewski as Marek und Vacek)	1 episode (1 July 1971)
1971	Von uns für Sie	Himself (with Marek Tomaszewski as Marek und Vacek)	1 episode (31 December 1971)
1974	Die Drehscheibe	Himself (with Marek Tomaszewski as Marek und Vacek)	1 episode (28 October 1974)
1975	Musik ist Trumpf	Himself (with Marek Tomaszewski as Marek und Vacek)	1 episode (13 September 1975)
1978	Die Montagsmaler	Himself (with Marek Tomaszewski as Marek und Vacek)	Episode: "ZDF gegen ARD - Silvesterparty gegen MOT" (10 January 1978)
1984	Na sowas!	Himself (with Marek Tomaszewski as Marek und Vacek)	Season 4, Episode 3 (17 October 1984)
