= Force et honneur =

Single by Nessbeal

from the album Sélection naturelle
- Released: 6 October 2011
- Genre: French hip hop
- Length: 3:32
- Label: 7th Magnitude, Sony Music France
- Songwriter(s): Nabil Sahli
- Producer(s): Trak Invaders

Nessbeal singles chronology
"L'histoire d'un mec qui coule" (2011)	"Force et honneur" (2011)	"Gunshot" (2011)

Audio sample
- "Force et honneur": file; help

Music video
- "Force et honneur" on YouTube

"Force et honneur" is a song by French rapper Nessbeal, and produced by the Trak Invaders. It was released on 16 August 2011 as the second single from his fourth studio album Sélection naturelle.

== Music video ==
A music video for the song was released on Nessbeal's VEVO channel on YouTube on 10 November 2011.

== Track listing ==
- Digital download
1. "Force et honneur" – 3:32

== Chart performance ==
Chart (2013)	Peak position
France (SNEP)	58
