= Ariel Wayz =

Rwandan singer (born 2000)

Ariel Wayz Uwayezu Arielle
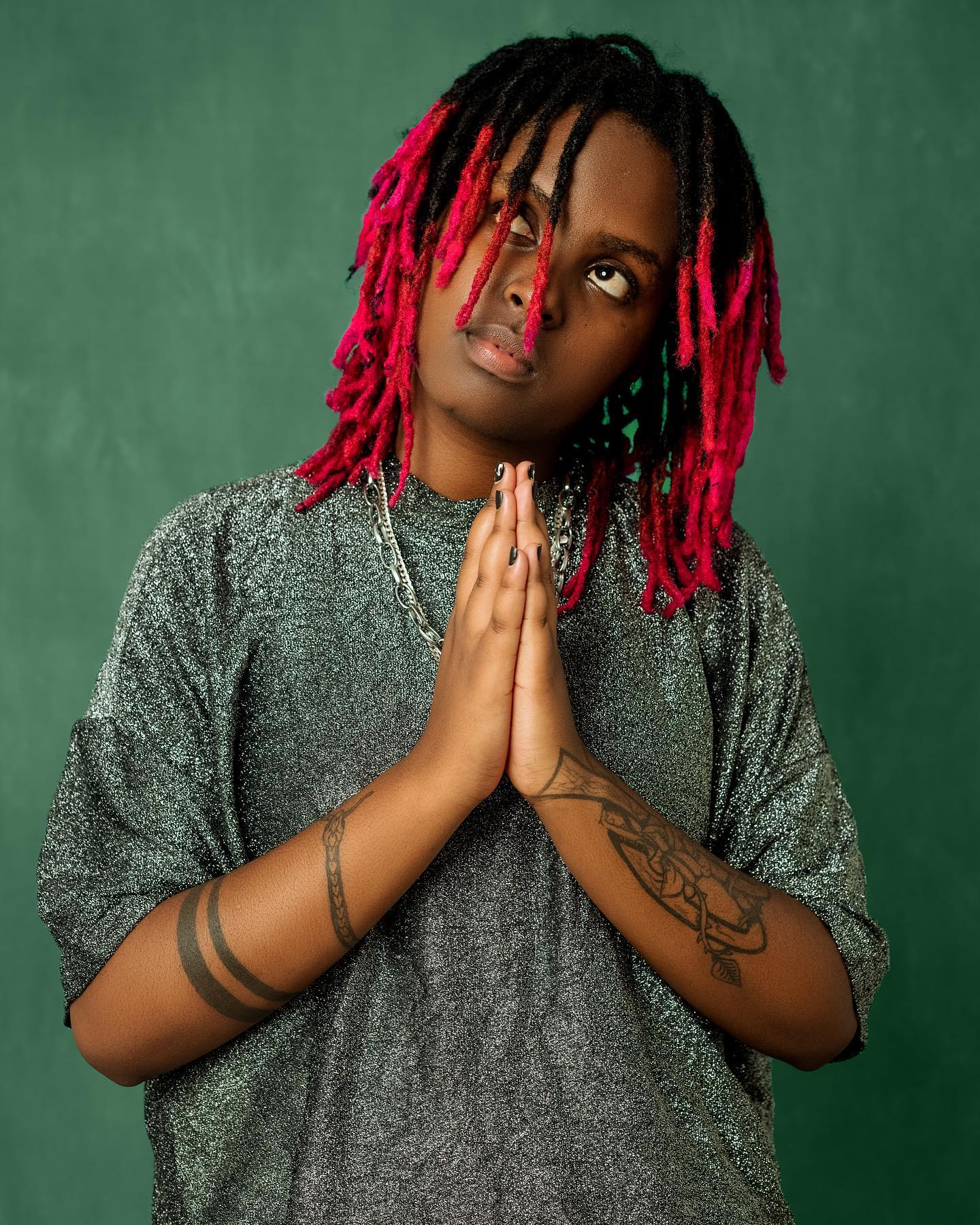
- Ariel Wayz in 2022

Background information
- Born: 2000 (age 25–26)
- Occupation: Singer
- Years active: 2020–present

Uwayezu Arielle (born 2000), known by her stage name Ariel Wayz, is a Rwandan singer.

== Early life and education ==
Wayz was born in 2000 in Rubavu, Western Province as the fifth child in a family of eight.

Her mother sung in Orchestre Ingeri during the 1990s.

She successfully auditioned for a Nyundo School of Music scholarship in 2015, starting in 2016.

== Career ==
Wayz was a co-founder and the vocal lead for the Symphony music band.

Her single The Boy from Us is a collaboration with Jumper Keellu and took part in the New Generation (band)'s production of the song Ndaryohewe.

In 2021, Wayz released Away.

In 2022, she released the song 10 Days with an associated music video. The video was directed by Frery Nkotanyi, produced by Kenny Pro, mixed and mastered by Davydenko and 3D Records, and features Donia Sbika.

In 2023, Wayz was nominated in the Best Artist - Rwanda category at Trace Awards.

== Personal life ==
Ariel Wayz has dated musical artist Juno Kizigenza.
