= Civilisation (album) =

Studio album by Orelsan
- Released: 19 November 2021
- Genre: French hip hop; pop; electronic
- Length: 57:43
- Language: French
- Label: 7th Magnitude; 3^{e} Bureau; Wagram
- Producer: Skread; Phazz; The Neptunes

Orelsan chronology
La fête est finie (2017)	Civilisation (2021)	La fuite en avant (2025)

Singles from Civilisation
- 1. "L'odeur de l'essence" Released: 17 November 2021; 2. "Jour meilleur" Released: 16 December 2021; 3. "La quête" Released: 3 March 2022; 4. "Du propre" Released: 16 June 2022; 5. "Ensemble" Released: 13 July 2022; 6. "CP 009 Évidemment" Released: 28 October 2022

Civilisation (French pronunciation: [sivilizɑsjɔ̃]) is the fourth studio album by French rapper Orelsan, released on 19 November 2021 through 7th Magnitude, 3^{e} Bureau and Wagram. The album was largely produced by long-time collaborator Skread and features guest appearances by Gringe and The Neptunes. It marks his first album release in over four years.

The album made a record-breaking debut on the French Albums Chart, selling more units than any other album in 2021. The album topped at 1st on French and Belgian (Wallonia) charts, as well as 2nd on Swiss charts at its best week. It was certified diamond by the SNEP within five months in France, becoming the fastest album to be certified diamond in the history of French rap.

According to the SNEP, Civilisation was the No.1 selling album in France for two consecutive years of 2021 and 2022.

== Background and reception ==
Professional ratings
Review scores
Source	Rating
Focus Vif	3/5 stars
Le Devoir	3/5 stars
Le Parisien	5/5 stars

Prior to its release, Orelsan did not reveal much about the album. According to him, in his mind the record signifies a "deconstruction". In late October 2021, it was announced that physical copies of the album would arrive in 15 different designs. Two vinyl editions of the album were released on 10 December 2021.

Civilisation sees the rapper departing from his "crazed humour" trademark style, instead settling for more "committed and personal tracks", in a soundscape between "drill" and "disco". French publication Le Parisien called Civilisation the best French rap album of 2021. However, the record was also criticised for containing too much singing while it was also noted that the rapper took himself too seriously at times.

== Commercial performance ==
In its first three days, Civilisation sold 94,306 units, beating a record previously held by PNL's Deux frères (2019). The album arrived atop the French Albums Chart, moving 138,929 units in its first week, 96,615 of which were physical sales. The sum reset the record for the largest opening week in France for an album in 2021, beating Adele's 30 which debuted at number two the same week.

The lead single "L'odeur de l'essence" reached number one on the French Singles Chart. The other lead single "Jour meilleur" reached number one the following week. All of the album tracks entered the French Singles Chart Top 20 in its first week, nine of which reached the Top 10.

== Track listing ==
Civilisation track listing
No.	Title	Writer(s)	Producer(s)	Length
1.	"Shonen"	Aurélien Cotentin; Matthieu Le Carpentier	Skread	2:33
2.	"La quête"	Cotentin; Le Carpentier; Phazz	Phazz; Skread	4:04
3.	"Du propre"	Cotentin; Le Carpentier	Skread	3:47
4.	"Bébéboa"	Cotentin; Eddie Purple	Cotentin	3:02
5.	"Rêve mieux"	Cotentin; Phazz	Phazz	3:44
6.	"Seul avec du monde autour"	Cotentin; Le Carpentier	Skread	3:28
7.	"Manifeste"	Cotentin; Le Carpentier	Skread	7:22
8.	"L'odeur de l'essence"	Cotentin; Le Carpentier; Phazz	Skread; Phazz	4:42
9.	"Jour meilleur"	Cotentin; Le Carpentier	Skread	3:01
10.	"Baise le monde"	Cotentin; Le Carpentier	Skread	3:45
11.	"Casseurs Flowters Infinity" (with Gringe)	Cotentin; Le Carpentier; Guillaume Tranchant	Skread	3:08
12.	"Dernier verre" (featuring The Neptunes)	Cotentin; Le Carpentier; Chad Hugo; Pharrell Williams	The Neptunes; Skread	3:23
13.	"Ensemble" (featuring Skread)	Cotentin; Le Carpentier	Skread	4:43
14.	"Athéna"	Cotentin; Phazz	Phazz	2:52
15.	"Civilisation"	Cotentin; Le Carpentier	Skread	4:05
Total length:				57:43

Civilisation Perdue track listing
No.	Title	Writer(s)	Producer(s)	Length
1.	"CP_001_ Intro Civilisation Perdue"	Aurélien Cotentin; Matthieu Le Carpentier	Skread	2:41
2.	"CP_002_ Les aventures de MiniSan"	Cotentin; Le Carpentier	Skread	4:46
3.	"CP_003_ Toujours perdu quand même"	Cotentin; Le Carpentier	Skread	3:38
4.	"CP_004_ Juste un dernier"	Cotentin; Le Carpentier	Skread	3:09
5.	"CP_005_ Ok... Super..."	Cotentin; Le Carpentier	Skread	2:22
6.	"CP_006_ Ah la France"	Cotentin; Le Carpentier	Skread	2:31
7.	"CP_007_ Point de rupture"	Cotentin; Le Carpentier	Skread	3:42
8.	"CP_008_ Nous contre le monde"	Cotentin; Le Carpentier	Skread	2:47
9.	"CP_009_ Évidemment" (with Angèle)	Cotentin; Le Carpentier; Angèle Van Laeken	Skread	3:26
10.	"CP_010_ On a gagné"	Cotentin; Le Carpentier	Skread	3:45
Total length:				32:47

== Charts ==
=== Weekly charts ===
Weekly chart performance for Civilisation
Chart (2021)	Peak position
Belgian Albums (Ultratop Flanders)	11
Belgian Albums (Ultratop Wallonia)	1
French Albums (SNEP)	1
Swiss Albums (Schweizer Hitparade)	2

=== Year-end charts ===
2021 year-end chart performance for Civilisation
Chart (2021)	Position
Belgian Albums (Ultratop Wallonia)	2
French Albums (SNEP)	1
Swiss Albums (Schweizer Hitparade)	23

2022 year-end chart performance for Civilisation
Chart (2022)	Position
Belgian Albums (Ultratop Wallonia)	2
French Albums (SNEP)	1
Swiss Albums (Schweizer Hitparade)	12

2023 year-end chart performance for Civilisation
Chart (2023)	Position
Belgian Albums (Ultratop Wallonia)	16
French Albums (SNEP)	13

2024 year-end chart performance for Civilisation
Chart (2024)	Position
Belgian Albums (Ultratop Wallonia)	74
French Albums (SNEP)	53

2025 year-end chart performance for Civilisation
Chart (2025)	Position
Belgian Albums (Ultratop Wallonia)	124

== Certifications ==
Certifications for Civilisation
Region	Certification	Certified units/sales
France (SNEP)	2× Diamond	1,000,000^{‡}
^{‡} Sales+streaming figures based on certification alone.
