= La pluie =

Single by Orelsan and Stromae

from the album La fête est finie
- Released: 23 February 2018
- Genre: French hip hop
- Length: 2:56
- Songwriters: Aurélien Cotentin; Paul Van Haver
- Producers: Skread; Stromae

Music video
- "La pluie" on YouTube

"La pluie" is a song by French singer Orelsan and Belgian singer Stromae. The song peaked at number 2 on the Belgian Ultratop Wallonia Chart and at number 10 on the French Singles Chart.

== Charts ==
=== Weekly charts ===
Chart (2018)	Peak position
Belgium (Ultratop 50 Wallonia)	2
France (SNEP)	10
Switzerland (Media Control Romandy)	15

=== Year-end charts ===
Chart (2018)	Position
Belgium (Ultratop Wallonia)	12

== Certifications ==
Region	Certification	Certified units/sales
France (SNEP)	Diamond	333,333^{‡}
^{‡} Sales+streaming figures based on certification alone.
