= À chaque jour suffit sa peine =

Single by Nessbeal

from the album NE2S
- Released: 31 May 2010
- Length: 3:39, 3:35 (album version)
- Label: 7th Magnitude, Because Éditions, Sony Music France
- Songwriter(s): Nabil Sahli
- Producer(s): Skread

Nessbeal singles chronology
"Ça bouge pas" (2010)	"À chaque jour suffit sa peine" (2010)	"Ma grosse" (2010)

Music video
- "À chaque jour suffit sa peine" on YouTube

"À chaque jour suffit sa peine" is a song by French rapper Nessbeal, and produced by Skread. It was released on 31 May 2010 as the second single from his third studio album NE2S.

== Music video ==
A music video for the song was released on Nessbeal's VEVO channel on YouTube on 18 March 2011.

== Track listing ==
- Digital download
1. "À chaque jour suffit sa peine" – 3:39

== Isleym remix ==
French singer Isleym, who is mentored by Nessbeal, included a remix of the song in her extended play Avec le temps, which was released on 15 November 2010. A music video for the song, which shows Isleym performing the song in the studio with Dany Synthé on the piano while Skread produces and Nessbeal listens, was released on Isleym's YouTube channel on 29 October 2010.

== Chart performance ==
Chart (2010)	Peak position
Belgium (Ultratip Bubbling Under Wallonia)	15
France (SNEP) Download Charts	43
