= La terre est ronde =

Single by Orelsan

from the album Le chant des sirènes
- Released: 24 December 2011 (digital download); 5 March 2012 (CD single)
- Recorded: 2011
- Genre: French hip hop, R&B, pop-rap
- Length: 3:39
- Label: 7th Magnitude, Wagram
- Songwriters: Aurélien Cotentin, Frédéric Savio
- Producer: Fred Savio

Orelsan singles chronology
"Suicide social" (2011)	"La terre est ronde" (2011)	"D.P.M.O." (2012)

Audio sample
- "La terre est ronde": file; help

Music video
- "La terre est ronde" on YouTube

"La terre est ronde" is a song by French rapper Orelsan and produced by Frédéric "Fred" Savio. It was released on December 24, 2011 as the fifth single from his second studio album Le chant des sirènes. The single peaked at number 9 on the French (SNEP) Singles Chart and was nominated for "Best Song" at the 2013 Trace Urban Music Awards.

== Music video ==
Directed by Clément Cotentin, Orelsan's brother, the song's music video shows Orelsan and his co-musicians getting prepared for a live show, then performing live. the video ends with presentation of the band members to the public. It was made available on 28 December 2011 through his YouTube account and is longer than the record release at 4 minutes and 13 seconds.

== Track list ==
- Digital download
1. "La terre est ronde" – 3:39
- CD single
1. "La terre est ronde" – 3:39

== Charts ==
Chart (2011–2012)	Peak position
France (SNEP)	9
Belgium (Ultratop 50 Wallonia)	15
