= Suicide social =

Single by Orelsan

from the album Le chant des sirènes
- Released: 15 September 2011
- Recorded: 2011
- Genre: French hip hop, conscious hip hop, horrorcore
- Length: 5:41
- Label: 7th Magnitude, Wagram
- Songwriters: Aurélien Cotentin, Matthieu Le Carpentier
- Producer: Skread

Orelsan singles chronology
"Plus rien ne m'étonne" (2011)	"Suicide social" (2011)	"La terre est ronde" (2011)

Audio sample
- "Suicide social": file; help

Music video
- "Suicide social" on YouTube

"Suicide social" is a song by French rapper Orelsan and produced by Skread. It was released on September 15, 2011, as the fourth single from his second studio album Le chant des sirènes.

In the song, Orelsan assumes the persona of a distressed, working individual who spends his last minutes tackling several political, cultural and religious issues in France, including the "incompetents" serving in the French government, neo-Nazism and the LGBT community, before committing suicide by shooting himself.

== Music video ==
The music video was released on 15 September 2011 on YouTube as part of the single's release. Directed by Mathieu Foucher, the video is largely a lyric video, where the lyrics of the song appear in the video as Orelsan raps them, along with other various illustrations in line with the song's lyrics.

== Track listing ==
- Digital download
1. "Suicide social" – 5:41

== Chart performance ==
Chart (2011)	Peak position
France (SNEP)	53
