= Marek Tomaszewski =

Polish pianist

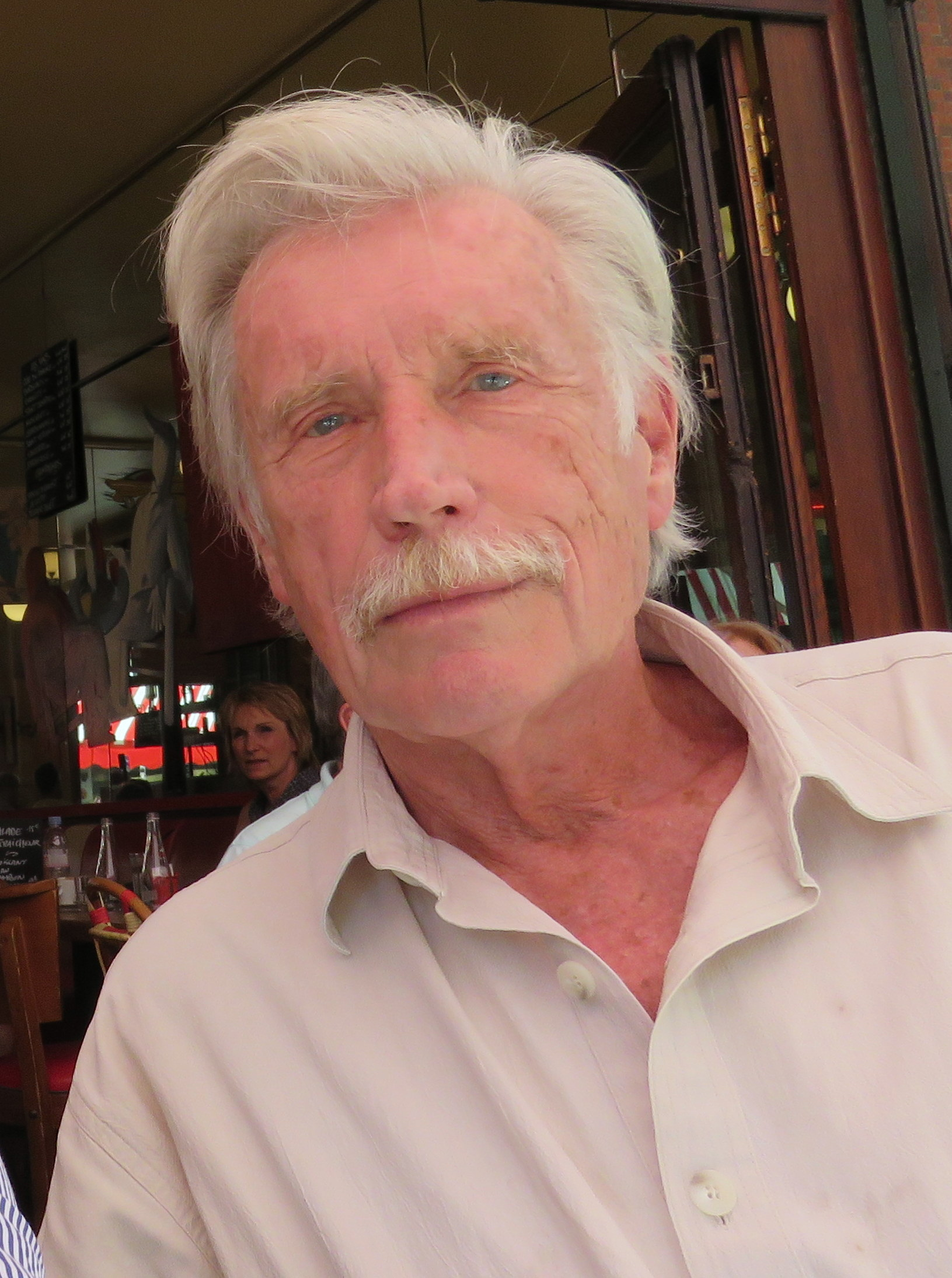
- Tomaszewski in 2016

Background information
- Born: Marek Tomaszewski; November 20, 1943 (age 82); Kraków, General Government
- Genres: Classical, jazz
- Occupation: Pianist
- Instrument: Piano
- Years active: 1963–present
- Formerly of: Marek i Wacek
- Website: www.marektomaszewski.com

Marek Tomaszewski (born 20 November 1943) is a Polish pianist. He was one half of the pianist duo Marek and Wacek with Wacław Kisielewski from 1963 until his death on 12 July 1986. He is the father of French music video director David Tomaszewski.

== Discography ==
=== With Marek and Wacek ===
==== Long plays ====
- 1966 – Ballade pour deux pianos Barclay
- 1968
  - Kisielewski-Tomaszewski: Play Favourite Melodies (Pronit; CD re-release by Muza in 1994)
  - Marek & Vacek: Piano Firework (Polydor)
  - Marek & Vacek: Romanische Figel (Polydor)
  - Marek & Vacek: Träumerei (Polydor)
- 1969
  - Marek & Vacek: Piano Fascination (Polydor)
  - Marek & Vacek: Piano Firework, Vol. 1-2 (Polydor)
- 1970 – Marek & Vacek: Classical and Pop Pianos (Polydor)
- 1971 – Marek & Vacek: Stargala, Vol. 1-2 (Polydor)
- 1972 – Marek & Vacek: Concert Hits (Electrola)
- 1973
  - Marek & Vacek: Concert Hits II (Electrola)
  - Marek & Vacek: Concert Hits, Vol. 1-2 (Electrola)
- 1974 – Marek und Vacek Live: Vol. 1-2 (Electrola)
- 1976 – Marek und Vacek: Spectrum (Electrola)
- 1977 – Marek & Vacek: Wiener Walzer (Electrola)
- 1978 – Marek und Vacek: Das Programm (Polydor)
- 1979
  - Marek und Vacek, Vol. 1-2 (Polydor)
  - Marek & Vacek Live (Wifon)
- 1980 – Marek & Vacek: Mondscheinsonate (Polydor)
- 1981
  - Marek i wacek grają utwory romantyczne (Veriton)
  - Marek und Vacek in Gold (Polydor)
- 1982 – Die Marek und Vacek Story 1962-1982, Vol. 1-2 (Prisma)
- 1984
  - Marek und Vacek '84 (Intercord)
  - Marek i Vacek (Wifon)
  - Marek und Vacek: Welterfolge (Intercord)
  - Marek and Vacek: Again (Pronit)
- 1987 – Marek & Vacek: The Last Concert, Vol. 1-2 (Pronit)

==== Compact discs ====
- 1994 – Kisielewski - Tomaszewski: Play Favourite Melodies (Muza)
- 2001 – Niepokonani: Marek & Vacek Live (Polskie Radio/Universal Music Polska)
- 2002 – Prząśniczka (Pomaton/EMI)

=== Solo discography ===
- 2004 – Premiere (MCP)
- 2008 – Rapsodia (Seychelles)
- 2010 – Le Sacre du Printemps (The Rite of Spring by Igor Stravinsky) (Agora)
- 2013 – Ballade pour Michelle (Seychelles)

== Other ventures ==
Tomaszewski appeared on the 2009 film Coco Chanel & Igor Stravinsky as the principal pianist alongside his son David, who was the principal violinist, and accompanied French rapper Orelsan on his video "Les vœux de RaelSan pour 2012" ("RaelSan's Wishes for 2012") as the pianist, again directed by his son David.

== Filmography ==
=== Film ===
Year	Title	Role	Notes
1973	Pariser Nächte	Himself (with Wacław Kisielewski as Marek und Vacek)	
2009	Coco Chanel & Igor Stravinsky	Principal pianist	Additional music composer

=== Television ===
Year	Title	Role	Notes
1971	Drei mal neun	Himself (with Wacław Kisielewski as Marek und Vacek)	1 episode (1 July 1971)
1971	Von uns für Sie	Himself (with Wacław Kisielewski as Marek und Vacek)	1 episode (31 December 1971)
1974	Die Drehscheibe	Himself (with Wacław Kisielewski as Marek und Vacek)	1 episode (28 October 1974)
1975	Musik ist Trumpf	Himself (with Wacław Kisielewski as Marek und Vacek)	1 episode (13 September 1975)
1978	Die Montagsmaler	Himself (with Wacław Kisielewski as Marek und Vacek)	Episode: "ZDF gegen ARD - Silvesterparty gegen MOT" (10 January 1978)
1984	Na sowas!	Himself (with Wacław Kisielewski as Marek und Vacek)	Season 4, Episode 3 (17 October 1984)
2002	The Official Star Wars Fan Film Awards	Himself	"Sparring Program"
