= L'odeur de l'essence =

2021 single by Orelsan

Single by Orelsan

from the album Civilisation
- Released: 17 November 2021
- Genre: French rap
- Length: 4:42
- Label: 7th Magnitude; 3ème Bureau; Wagram Music
- Songwriters: Orelsan; Skread
- Producer: Skread

Orelsan singles chronology
"Rêves bizarres" (2018)	"L'odeur de l'essence" (2021)	"Jour meilleur" (2021)

"L'odeur de l'essence" is a song by French rapper Orelsan, released on 17 November 2021, through 7th Magnitude, 3^{ème} Bureau and Wagram Music, as the lead single from his fourth studio album, Civilisation (2021). It is his first release as lead artist in nearly four years. Music critics acclaimed the song lyrics, while Interlude described it as an explosive and triumphant return for the rapper.

== Charts ==
Chart performance for "L'odeur de l'essence"
Chart (2021)	Peak position
Belgium (Ultratop 50 Wallonia)	4
France (SNEP)	1
Switzerland (Schweizer Hitparade)	19
