= Shake Shake Go =

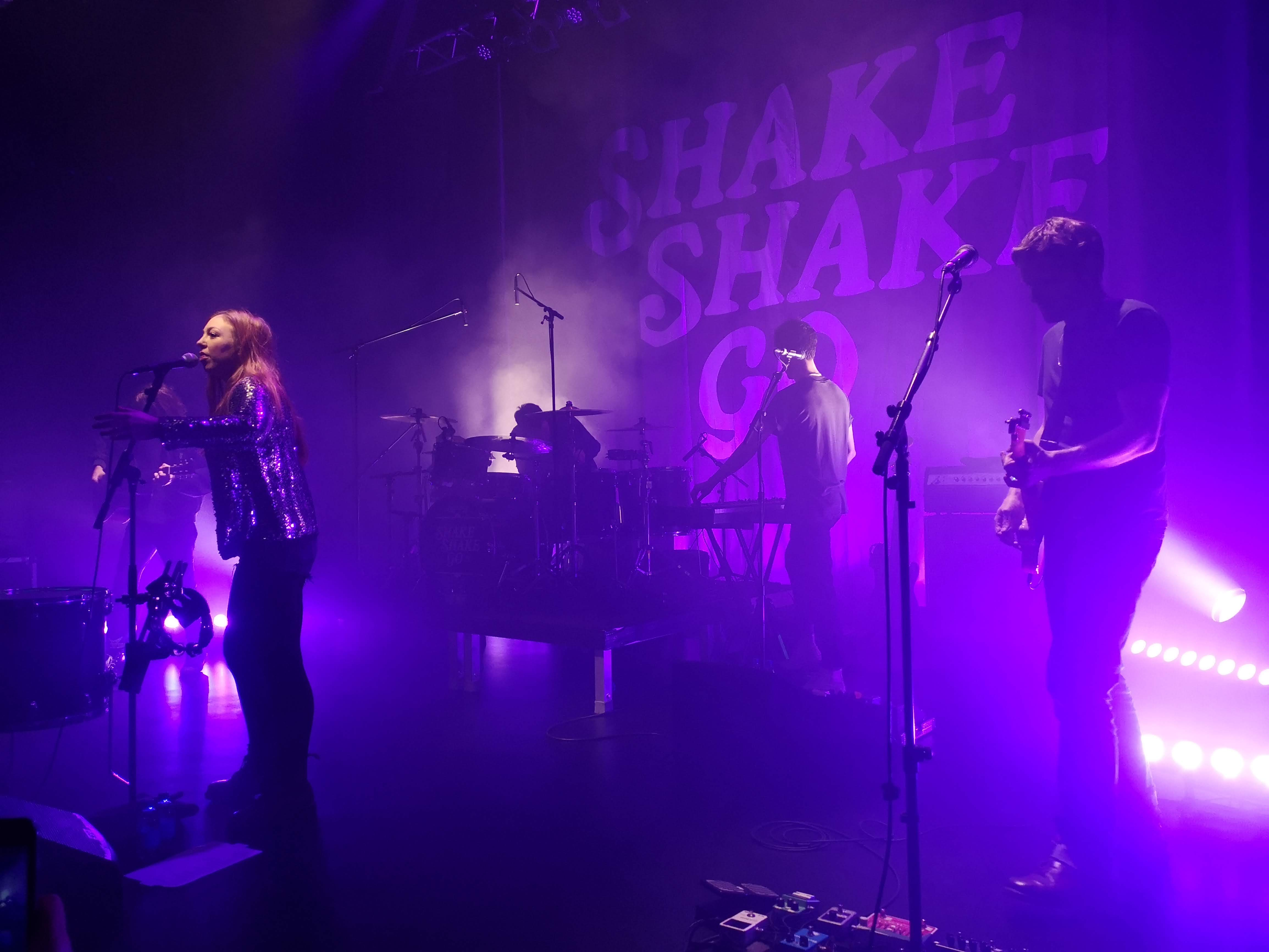
- Shake Shake Go @L'Epicentre, Collonge-Bellerive, 02.03.2019

Background information
- Origin: Wales; France
- Genres: Pop, folk
- Years active: 2012–present
- Label: Beaucoup Music
- Members: Poppy Jones; Kilian Saubusse; Virgile Rozand
- Past members: Toby Barnett; Marc Le Goff
- Website: www.shakeshakego.co.uk

Shake Shake Go is a British indie folk band based in London, England. The band is composed of Poppy Jones, Kilian Saubusse and Virgile Rozand. The band started from playing their collection of pop folk anthems along the streets of Britain and touring across UK and Europe as well as sharing stages with James Blunt as a supporting act on the UK leg of his 2014 World Tour. They released their debut single "England Skies" in December 2014 and their self-titled debut EP on 9 March 2015. The band released their second album Homesick on 4 September 2018.

== Discography ==
=== Albums ===
Year	Album	Peak positions	
Year	Album	UK	FRA
2016	All in Time	–	97
2018	Homesick	–	–
2023	Double Vision	–	–

=== EPs ===
- 2015: Shake Shake Go
- 2018: Dinosaur

=== Singles ===
Year	Title	Peak positions			Album
Year	Title	UK	FRA	SPN	Album
2014	"England Skies"	–	128	27	Shake Shake Go
