= Sélection naturelle =

Studio album by Nessbeal
- Released: 21 November 2011
- Genre: French hip hop, rap
- Length: 54:37
- Language: French
- Label: 7th Magnitude, Sony Music France
- Producer: Gee Futuristic, DJ Bellek, Fred Savio, Koudjo, Shuko, Skread, Trak Invaders

Nessbeal chronology
NE2S (2010)	Sélection naturelle (2011)

Singles from NE2S
- 1. "L'histoire d'un mec qui coule" Released: August 16, 2011; 2. "Force et honneur" Released: October 6, 2011; 3. "Gunshot" Released: October 14, 2011

Sélection naturelle is the fourth studio album by French rapper Nessbeal. It was released on November 21, 2011 by 7th Magnitude and Sony Music France on iTunes. The album entered and peaked the French Albums Charts at number 27.

== Concept ==
The album was conceived in 3 months during the summer of 2011. In an interview with Canal Street, Nessbeal explained that he was preparing an "Operation Desert Storm" with his producer Skread. This operation consisted of releasing three consecutive albums: Orelsan's Le chant des sirènes in September, Sélection naturelle in November and Isleym's Où ça nous mène later on. Skread would therefore provide majority of the production for the three albums.

In the same interview, Nessbeal revealed the origin of the title of his fourth album.

[I named my album] Sélection naturelle (Natural selection) for the era in which we live. [...] It is an apocalyptic era where man has become worse than an animal. I am a fan of National Geographic. I really like the reports on the animals, watching how an anthill develops, or, for example, when a [female] crocodile gives birth to 6 [offspring] and only two of them manage to survive. [...] That's just to say that we have to survive in natural selection. I am a young lion cub and I have to survive in this urban jungle.

— Nessbeal, in an interview with Canal Street.

== Singles ==
Sélection naturelle produced 3 singles:

- "L'histoire d'un mec qui coule" was released as the album's lead single on 16 August 2011, but did not chart.
- "Force et honneur" was released as the album's second single on 6 October 2011. It peaked at number 58 on the French Singles Chart.
- "Gunshot" was released as the album's third single on 14 October 2011, but did not chart.

== Track listing ==
No.	Title	Writer(s)	Producer(s)	Length
1.	"L'histoire d'un mec qui coule"	Nabil Sahli	Gee Futuristic	3:21
2.	"Force et honneur"	Sahli	Trak Invaders	3:32
3.	"Ginger Wine" (featuring Debrouya)	Sahli, Mikaël Billy	Koudjo	3:39
4.	"Gunshot"	Sahli	DJ Bellek, Fred Savio	5:09
5.	"J'suis un salaud"	Sahli	Skread	3:11
6.	"Thon à la Catalane" (featuring Selim du 94)	Sahli, Sélim Bélabès	Shuko	3:48
7.	"Zbeule"	Sahli	Trak Invaders	3:49
8.	"La nébuleuse des aigles" (featuring Isleym)	Sahli, Isleym	Skread	3:20
9.	"Drapeau blanc" (featuring Soprano)	Sahli, Saïd M'Roubaba	DJ Bellek, Fred Savio	4:29
10.	"Soldat"	Sahli	Skread	4:11
11.	"Là où les vents nous mènent" (featuring La Fouine and Mister You)	Sahli, Laouni Mouhid, Younès Latifi	Trak Invaders	3:55
12.	"Nabil" (featuring Mélissa Nkonda)	Sahli, Mélissa Nkonda	DJ Bellek, Fred Savio	4:48
13.	"La naissance du mal"	Sahli	Skread	3:10
14.	"Sélection naturelle"	Sahli	Skread	4:16
Total length:				54:38

== Chart performance ==
Chart (2011)	Peak position
French Albums (SNEP)	27
