= NE2S =

Studio album by Nessbeal
- Released: 14 June 2010
- Genre: French hip hop, rap
- Length: 52:08
- Language: French
- Label: 7th Magnitude, Because Éditions, Sony Music France
- Producer: 2093&2031, Indila, Skread, Street Fabulous

Nessbeal chronology
RSC Sessions Perdues (2009)	NE2S (2010)	Sélection naturelle (2011)

Singles from NE2S
- 1. "Ça bouge pas" Released: May 31, 2010; 2. "À chaque jour suffit sa peine" Released: May 31, 2010; 3. "Ma grosse" Released: June 14, 2010

NE2S is the third studio album by French rapper Nessbeal. It was released on June 14, 2010 by 7th Magnitude, Because Éditions and Sony Music France on iTunes. The album entered the French Albums Charts at number 13, where it had since peaked.

== Singles ==
- "Ça bouge pas" was released as the album's lead single on 31 May 2010, but did not chart.
- "À chaque jour suffit sa peine" was released as the album's second single, also on 31 May 2010. It peaked at number 15 on the Belgian Ultratip 50 Chart in Wallonia.
- "Ma grosse", featuring Orelsan, was released as the album's third single on 14 June 2010, the day of the album's release. However, it did not chart.

== Track listing ==
All songs written by Nabil Sahli (except "NE2S"; written by Youssef Chellak).

No.	Title	Producer(s)	Length
1.	"Certifié classique"	2093&2031	3:08
2.	"À chaque jour suffit sa peine"	Skread	3:35
3.	"Ça bouge pas"	Skread	3:47
4.	"After"	Skread	3:22
5.	"Au bout de la route" (featuring La Fouine)	Skread	3:54
6.	"Papa instable"	Skread	3:23
7.	"La traversée du désert"	Skread	3:41
8.	"I.L.S." (featuring Bradley Jones)	Skread	3:04
9.	"Ma grosse" (featuring Orelsan)	Skread	4:02
10.	"Je vole au-dessus de ça" (featuring Isleym)	Skread	3:44
11.	"Bouteille à la mer" (featuring EvaanZ)	Street Fabulous	3:56
12.	"NE2S"	Street Fabulous	4:07
13.	"Balles dans le pied"	Skread	4:18
14.	"Poussière d'empire" (featuring Indila)	Indila, Skread	4:07
Total length:			52:08

== Personnel ==
Credits for NE2S adapted from Discogs.

- 2093&2031 – Producer
- Chris Chavenon – Mixing
- EvaanZ – Featured artist
- La Fouine – Featured artist
- Indila – Featured artist, producer
- Isleym – Featured artist
- Bradley Jones – Featured artist
- Cyril Meric – Recording
- Fred N'Landu – Mixing
- Orelsan – Featured artist
- Guen Roulette – Recording
- Skread – Producer, recording
- Street Fabulous – Producer
- Oz Touch – Mixing
- Mister You – Featured artist

== Chart performance ==
Chart (2010)	Peak position
Belgian Albums (Ultratop Wallonia)	50
French Albums (SNEP)	13
