= La mélodie des briques =

Studio album by NessBeal
- Released: 20 March 2006
- Genre: French hip hop, rap
- Length: 63:05
- Language: French
- Label: Nouvelle Donne
- Producer: Animalsons, DJ Goldfingers, DJ Lord Chamy, Four Track, Scarface, Skread

NessBeal chronology
La mélodie des briques (2006)	Rois sans couronne (2008)

La mélodie des briques is the debut studio album by French rapper Nessbeal, released under the name NessBeal. It was released on March 20, 2006 by Nouvelle Donne in France. The album entered the French Albums Charts and peaked at number 24.

== Track listing ==
Producer credits adapted from Discogs.

No.	Title	Writer(s)	Producer(s)	Length
1.	"Intro"	Nabil Sahli	Skread	3:18
2.	"Rap de tess"	Sahli	Skread	3:37
3.	"L'œil du mensonge"	Sahli	Animalsons	5:49
4.	"La mélodie des briques" (featuring Jango Jack)	Sahli	Skread	4:03
5.	"Loin du rivage" (featuring Mohamed Lamine)	Sahli, Mohamed Lamine	Skread	4:25
6.	"10.000 questions"	Sahli	Skread	4:05
7.	"Princesse au regard triste"	Sahli	Skread	4:11
8.	"Cellule autonome"	Sahli	Four Track	2:46
9.	"Les larmes de ce monde"	Sahli	Scarface	5:33
10.	"Maroc Sticky"	Sahli	Animalsons	4:35
11.	"Maroc Sticky"	Sahli	DJ Goldfingers, DJ Lord Chamy	4:21
12.	"Candidat au crime"	Sahli	Skread	4:24
13.	"Peur d'aimer" (featuring Vitaa)	Sahli, Charlotte Gonin	Skread	4:06
14.	"Funeste écriture"	Sahli	Skread	3:29
15.	"Chute libre" (Dicidens)	Sahli, Koriace, Zesau	Skread	4:23
Total length:				63:05

== Chart performance ==
Chart (2006)	Peak position
French Albums (SNEP)	24
