= Ils sont cools =

Single by Orelsan featuring Gringe

from the album Le chant des sirènes
- Released: 22 June 2012
- Recorded: 2011
- Genre: French hip hop, alternative hip hop
- Length: 3:37
- Label: 7th Magnitude, Wagram
- Songwriter(s): Aurélien Cotentin, Guillaume Tranchant, Cookin' Soul
- Producer(s): Cookin' Soul

Orelsan singles chronology
"D.P.M.O." (2012)	"Ils sont cools" (2012)	"Bloqué" (2013)

Gringe singles chronology
"Ils sont cools" (2012)	"Bloqué" (2013)

Audio sample
- "Ils sont cools": file; help

Music video
- "Ils sont cools" on YouTube

"Ils sont cools" ("They are cool" ) is a song by French rapper Orelsan featuring fellow French rapper and Casseurs Flowters member Gringe. Produced by Spanish producer-DJ duo Cookin' Soul, it was released on 22 June 2012 as the sixth and final single from Orelsan's second studio album Le chant des sirènes. It entered the French Singles Chart at number 143 on 23 June 2012, and has since peaked at number 66.

== Music video ==
=== Background and concept ===
The music video for "Ils sont cools" was released on 22 June 2012 on YouTube as part of the single's release. It was directed by David Tomaszewski.

The video takes inspiration from the manga universe. Orelsan, being passionate about Japanese culture, drew inspiration from the manga series Knights of the Zodiac for the special effects and the costumes. The two rappers took the place of the knights Pegasus Seiya (Orelsan) and Dragon Shiryū (Gringe).

For the scenery, Tomaszewski chose to spend two days at Nîmes at the arena, the Temple of Diane and the Maison Carrée, and one morning at Saintes-Maries-de-la-Mer in Camargue for the ocean scenes. Orelsan and Gringe had to change some of the song's lyrics to fit well with the video.

"Finally, I went to Athens without Orelsan and Gringe to take the shots of the Acropolis, the Parthenon and the exterior shots of the streets for two days [...] I really felt like filming in an exotic city and mixing ancient and urban sites."

— Tomaszewski in an interview with jactiv.ouest-france.fr.

=== Synopsis ===
Gringe (left) and Orelsan before their fusion.

"Orelsinge", the result of the fusion.

Orelsan and Gringe are two superheroes preparing themselves for an imminent attack. For most of the video, the two rappers are seen visiting several sites of the city and training themselves, and towards the end they freerun across the Parthenon. In the early stages of the video, 7th Magnitude co-founder Ablaye makes an appearance as a cook in a shawarma restaurant, who is serving the two rappers. The rappers' habitual producer Skread is also seen having a beer at the bar.

Towards the end of the video, at the Parthenon, the two are seen looking up to the sky at a giant Sexion d'Assaut member Maître Gims, who looks down at and taunts them from the clouds, after which the two rappers perform a fusion technique, resulting in a transformation that includes Orelsan's hair, Gringe's beard, a combination of their two faces and a monkey's tail. He then goes on to say: "Mes amis m'appellent Orelsinge; mes ennemis appellent les renforts." ("My friends call me Orelsinge; my enemies call for reinforcements." – "Orelsinge" is a portmanteau of Orelsan and Gringe; the word "singe" is French for "monkey"). Orelsinge is then seen jumping up with his right fist toward the sky, before the video shifts to a clip saying "À suivre..." ("To be continued...").

=== Cultural references ===
Several cultural references are made throughout the video.:

- The Teenage Mutant Ninja Turtles and their battle cry "Kowabunga!", which the 2 rappers shout towards the end.
- Fist of the North Star (Hokuto no Ken), by citing Kenshiro, the protagonist of the series.
- Hunter × Hunter by citing the characters Gon and Killua.
- In the middle of the video, Skread is seen pouring himself a beer in the same bar he was in earlier, after which he freezes his glass with his hand and then drinks. This is a reference to Mortal Kombat character Sub-Zero.
- The scene where Orelsan gets out of the ocean towards the end of the video is a reference to Daniel Craig's beach scene in Casino Royale as James Bond.
- The Orelsinge fusion is a reference to Gogeta from Dragon Ball Z, who is the result of a fusion between Goku and Vegeta.

=== Reception ===
The video was nominated for the Trace Urban Music Award for Best Music Video in 2013.

On 10 July 2012, an animated video of Orelsinge and Maître Gims doing battle entitled "Sharingan" was uploaded on YouTube by Chapokane Animation. The animation style is almost identical to that of Dragon Ball Z. In the video, Maître Gims portrays Frieza in his final form (but with Gims' face and skin colour), and as such, he is given the name "Gimzer" (Frieza's name is "Freezer" in French versions of Dragon Ball Z), while Orelsinge very closely resembles Goku in the video. Throughout the video the two are seen performing various techniques seen in Dragon Ball Z, such as Instant Transmission, Goku's Kamehameha and Frieza's Death Ball.

== Track listing ==
- Digital download
1. "Ils sont cools" – 3:37

== Chart performance ==
Chart (2012)	Peak position
France (SNEP)	66
