= Rois sans couronne =

Studio album by Nessbeal
- Released: 9 June 2008
- Genre: French hip hop, rap
- Length: 61:52
- Language: French
- Label: Nouvelle Donne, Because Éditions
- Producer: Bala Bambino, DJ Maître, Getop, Médeline, Saïko, Shuko, Skread, Tefa, Trak Invaders, Wealstarr

Nessbeal chronology
La mélodie des briques (2006)	Rois sans couronne (2008)	RSC Sessions Perdues (2009)

Rois sans couronne is the second studio album by French rapper Nessbeal. It was released on June 9, 2008, by Nouvelle Donne Music and Because Éditions for digital download. The album entered the French Albums Charts at number 18, where it had since peaked.

== Track listing ==
Producer credits adapted from Discogs.

No.	Title	Producer(s)	Length
1.	"Rimes instinctives"	Skread	3:15
2.	"Le loup dans la bergerie"	Skread	3:49
3.	"Réalité française"	Skread	4:07
4.	"H.L.M. Bonnie et Clyde"	Skread	3:40
5.	"La vie des pauvres" (featuring Wallen)	Bala Bambino, Getop	3:26
6.	"On aime ça"	Skread	3:29
7.	"Légende d'hiver" (featuring K-Reen)	DJ Maître, Tefa, Wealstarr	3:48
8.	"Rois sans couronne"	Shuko	3:57
9.	"Autopsie d'une tragédie"	Skread	4:21
10.	"Au-delà de l'horizon"	Trak Invaders	3:48
11.	"Tu vois ce que je veux dire"	Bala Bambino, Getop	3:17
12.	"Les anges aux visages sales" (featuring Le Rat Luciano)	Skread	3:55
13.	"Dans la jungle" (featuring Dicidens)	Saïko	4:21
14.	"Clown triste"	Skread	4:29
15.	"Casablanca" (featuring Cheba Maria)	Skread	3:35
16.	"Ça ira mieux demain"	Médeline	4:35
Total length:			61:52

== Chart performance ==
Chart (2008)	Peak position
French Albums (SNEP)	18
