= David Tomaszewski =

Polish-born French film director

- Born: 6 October 1984 (age 41)
- Occupations: Director, digital artist
- Parent: Marek Tomaszewski (father)
- Website: www.davidtomaszewski.com

David Tomaszewski (born 6 October 1984) is a French music video director and digital artist of Polish descent. He is the son of Polish pianist Marek Tomaszewski and Polish painter Agata Preyzner. He has 2 children with life partner and actress Naila Mansour.

== Videography ==
Year	Title	Featuring
2009	La Peur de l'Échec	Orelsan
2010	N'Importe Comment	The Toxic Avenger with Orelsan
2011	RaelSan	Orelsan
2011	Plus rien ne m'étonne	Orelsan
2011	I Cannot Think	Outlines
2011	I Wanna Be Sedated	Lexicon (Ramones cover)
2011	Les Vœux de RaelSan pour 2012	Orelsan
2012	Ils sont cools	Orelsan
2012	Je ne sais pas	LFDV
2012	Si seul	Orelsan
2012	Les adieux de RaelSan avant l'Apocalypse	Orelsan
2013	Bloqué	Casseurs Flowters Orelsan and Gringe
2013	Quand La Musique est Bonne	Amel Bent ft. Soprano - (Génération Goldman)
2014	Fais les backs	Casseurs Flowters (Orelsan et Gringe)
2014	Dorothy	Polo & Pan
2014	The Rising	Mission Control
2014	R U Swimming?	Mademoiselle K
2014	Décembre	Karim Ouellet feat Orelsan
2015	Chaos Moderne	Max Edwards
2015	Brooklyn Amusement Park	Polo & Pan
2016	Je Te Pardonne	Maître Gims (feat. Sia)
2016	Ma Beauté	Maître Gims
2016	Comme Avant	David Hallyday
2017	Never Let You Go	Mosimann
2017	LOVE	S.Pri Noir
2018	La Nuit	L.E.J
2018	Fusée Ariane	S.Pri Noir
2018	Fais-moi la passe	Jul
2018	Come Back To Me	Shake Shake Go
2019	Désaccord	Vitaa (en duo avec Dadju)
2019	Wonderful	Archie Faulks
2019	VersuS	Vitaa & Slimane
2019	A Little Bit of You	2pillz
2019	Forever Young	Orlinski ft. Carl Vermont
2019	Ça Va, Ça Vient	Vitaa & Slimane
2019	Coffee Break	VOG ft. Gabriella
2019	Demain C'est Loin	K.Maro
2020	Taedium	SEB
2020	Antistress	SEB
2020	Lonely	Mosimann
2020	Bling	Tessæ
2020	Amour Toxic	Dadju
2020	E Penso A Te	Claudio Capéo
2020	Via Con Me	Claudio Capéo
2020	Évident	Tessæ
2021	Mon Refuge	Julien Clerc
2021	De l'Or	Vitaa & Slimane
2021	Bidonville	Gad Elmaleh
2021	L'odeur de l'essence	Orelsan
2021	Jour meilleur	Orelsan

== Filmography ==
		Year	Title
Director	Short films	2004	Escape From Tatooine
Director	Short films	2005	Covered
Director	Short films	2005	Magritte Room
Director	Short films	2007	Vendome, Paris
Director	Short films	2016	Cobalt
Director	Short films	2021	Neit (in post-production)
Director	TV commercials	2007	Quick: Spider-man
Director	TV commercials	2014	G-Shock
Main Titles Designer		2009	Coco Chanel & Igor Stravinsky
Main Titles Designer		2010	Le Mac
Main Titles Designer		2011	Twiggy
Main Titles Designer		2011	A Butterfly Kiss
Main Titles Designer		2012	The Players
Main Titles Designer		2016	Mr & Mme Adelman
Main Titles Designer		2019	La Belle Époque
Main Titles Designer		2021	OSS 117: Alerte Rouge en Afrique Noire
Actor		2010	Coco Chanel & Igor Stravinsky (principal violinist)

== Awards ==
Year	Award	Nominated work	Category	Result
2004	The Official Star Wars Fan Film Awards	Escape From Tatooine	George Lucas Selects Award	Won
2002	The Official Star Wars Fan Film Awards	Sparring Program	Young Jedi Award	Won
2005	New York International Independent Film and Video Festival	Covered	Short Film Award for Best Director	Won
