= RSC Sessions Perdues =

Mixtape by Nessbeal
- Released: 14 April 2009
- Genre: French hip hop, rap
- Length: 40:35
- Language: French
- Label: Nouvelle Donne, Musicast

Nessbeal chronology
Rois sans couronne (2008)	RSC Sessions Perdues (2009)	NE2S (2010)

Collector's Edition

RSC Sessions Perdues is a mixtape by French rapper Nessbeal. It was released on April 14, 2009 by Nouvelle Donne Music in France, and peaked at number 90 on the French Albums Charts.

A collector's edition re-release of the mixtape entitled RSC Sessions Perdues: Édition Collector was released on June 15, 2009 by Nouvelle Donne Music and Musicast on iTunes.

== Track listing ==
Disc one: RSC Sessions Perdues – Standard edition
No.	Title	Length
1.	"Kheye"	1:43
2.	"Ma solitude" (Isleym featuring Nessbeal)	4:12
3.	"No Life (remix)" (featuring Orelsan)	3:01
4.	"B.E.C.T."	5:01
5.	"C'est la crise" (featuring Daddy Mory)	3:06
6.	"Colonne vertebrale"	3:58
7.	"Décroche la lune"	4:40
8.	"Amour éternel"	3:34
9.	"Rap de paria"	3:05
10.	"Amnesia (La salade)"	3:42
11.	"Ça ira mieux demain"	4:33
Total length:		40:35

Bonus track
No.	Title	Length
12.	"Le loup dans la bergerie"	3:26

Disc two: RSC Sessions Perdues – DVD
No.	Title	Length
1.	"T'étais où?"
2.	"Trop bon, trop con"
3.	"Grand méchant loup"
4.	"Dance de guerriers"
5.	"La charme de la tristesse"
6.	"Retour de flammes"
7.	"J'resiste"
8.	"Le cri de ma communauté"
9.	"Put'1 de son"
10.	"La joie de survivre"
11.	"Peine de mort"
12.	"Reportage avec Kamelancien"
13.	"Interview: Réponses aux internautes"
14.	"Making of "La joie de survivre""

RSC Session Perdues: Édition Collector re-release
No.	Title	Length
1.	"Kheye"	3:32
2.	"Ma solitude" (Isleym featuring Nessbeal)	4:12
3.	"No Life (remix)" (featuring Orelsan)	3:01
4.	"B.E.C.T."	5:01
5.	"Patate en cuir" (performed by Koriace)	3:14
6.	"Enterré vivant"	4:06
7.	"C'est la crise" (featuring Daddy Mory)	3:06
8.	"Colonne vertebrale"	3:58
9.	"Décroche la lune"	4:40
10.	"Amour éternel"	3:34
11.	"Rap de paria"	3:05
12.	"Amnesia (La salade)"	3:42
13.	"Paname" (performed by Tito Prince)	3:49
14.	"10.000 questions" (featuring Ablaye M'Baye)	3:59
15.	"Tu vois ce que je veux dire (remix)"	3:57
16.	"Du sale"	4:24
17.	"Au jour le jour" (featuring Marc Antoine)	3:32
18.	"Ça ira mieux demain"	4:33
19.	"Le loup dans la bergerie"	3:26
Total length:		72:51

== Chart performance ==
Chart (2009)	Peak position
French Albums (SNEP)	90

== Release history ==
Region	Date	Edition	Format	Label
France	14 April 2009	Standard	CD, DVD	Nouvelle Donne
France	15 June 2009	Collector	Digital download	Nouvelle Donne, Musicast
