= Trace Africa =

South African Afro-pop music channel

Trace Ngoma
- Country: South Africa
- Broadcast area: Africa
- Headquarters: Johannesburg

Programming
- Languages: English; French
- Picture format: DStv, 1080i (HDTV, 16:9) - DStv

Ownership
- Owner: TPG Capital
- Sister channels: Trace FM; Trace Gospel; Trace Mziki; Trace Naija; Trace Toca; Trace Muzika; Trace Kitoko; Trace Ayiti; Trace Jama; Trace Vanilla Islands; Trace Mboa; Trace Afrikora; Trace Sport Stars; Trace Urban; Trace Caribbean; Trace Brasil

History
- Launched: 15 November 2011; 14 years ago
- Replaced: Trace Sport Stars (DStv)
- Former names: Trace Africa (2016 - 2025)

Links
- Website: http://www.trace.tv/trace-africa

Availability

Terrestrial
- DStv: Channel 326
- Zuku TV: Channel 746

Trace Africa is an Afro-pop music channel dedicated to airing Africa's top music artists. Trace Africa, Africa’s number one music channel, is dedicated to playing and showcasing music of Africa’s top artists and genres including Afro-pop, coupé-décalé, Kwaito house, Afro-trap, makossa, and ndombolo through radio and live concert events. Trace Africa is a smaller section of the larger Trace brand, a company dedicated to spreading music, news and culture throughout the African Diaspora. Trace Africa premiered on DStv, on 1 September 2016 as a replacement to Trace Sports Stars through the continent and as of 2017 is also now on StarSat

Since then, Trace Africa has greatly expanded with ten radio shows featuring music from all corners of Africa. With the implementation of these new radio shows the youthful, innovative music channel, with the ability to offer powerful audiences in target populations, has recently been rated number one in French-speaking Africa. Trace Africa has traditionally found much of its success through music broadcasting; however, it places to expand its reach into the field of sports with its launch of Trace Sports Channel. This channel aims to connect sports and entertainment by showing the private lives of sports stars. With this new development, Trace hopes to expand its reach globally so as to free itself from reliance on developed countries

== Trace Africa channels ==
Trace Africa has ten radio shows with specialized music from all corners of Africa. Two of these, Naija and Mziki, traditionally Zimbabwean music, are a recent addition to Trace Africa. According to Trace’s chief executive officer Oliver Laouchez, "Trace is already the leading music brand in Africa. These three new localized music channels will help promote more artists from the three biggest music hubs of Africa and they will better serve the strong need of the local audiences for great local content". The premier of these specialized shows was taken with open arms by many Zimbabwean artists because their music is often overshadowed by music from Nigeria, Ghana and Kenya. The Trace Africa Channels include:

- Guest star – this show provides a closer look at the hot new African artists through exclusive interviews that allow listeners to learn every detail of their favorite stars.
- 30 African hit – a count-down of the top 30 African music videos
- 10 sound system – a sound system featuring the best of African reggae, dancehall and its dancehall queens.
- Pop 10 – a count-down of the best African Pop music videos.
- Naija 10 – a count-down of the best West African music videos with genres including Afro beats, Afro pop and hip life ranked highest on the charts.
- Mziki 10 – East African channel in Swahili and English that counts down the best East African hits including genres such as bongo flavas and music from Uganda, Kenya and Tanzania
- Hits and lyrics – a sixty-minute karaoke-style channel of the best and most current hits
- BTB – "'bout to blow," plays the newest talent in African music as they are about to blow up
- Sunday Vaabz – this channel is dubbed the “Sunday lunch playlist” and plays music ranging from old school favorites to the latest in African soul music.

== Zimbabwe and Trace Africa ==
Since music for Trace Africa is selected and researched from local and international artists at one of the three Trace sites located in South Africa, Cameroon and Nigeria, local artists are set to benefit greatly from the growth of Trace Africa. Those from Zimbabwe have especially benefited from Trace Africa’s methods of finding music. Zimbabwean artists have often been suppressed in the shadow of more well-known Nigerian and South African artists, and Trace Africa has now become the platform where many artists can showcase their talents and put themselves on the map. Furthermore, with the new trace Africa geography-based channels, Zimbabweans and other artists who have often been overshadowed now have the chance to be seen. This also increases creativity and productivity in local artists.

== Trace En ==
Trace is the overarching brand that encompasses Trace Africa founded in 2011. Trace is a mix of music videos, specials and documentaries, covering genres like kwaito, house, sungura, coupé-décalé, Afro-pop, rumba and ndombolo. With its headquarters based in Paris and sites in three countries in Africa, Trace has become an international broadcasting and news platform in the past seven years. Trace’s website, trace.tv, helps readers and listeners keep up with the latest of African pop news. Trace showcases music through featured, charts, playlists, clips, events and Trace Live, live performances held by Trace throughout the year.

Culture is also a fundamental part of Trace news and featured articles about African TV, movies and art. Trace also uses its news portion to showcase famous Africans throughout the diaspora through style sections, red carpet looks and biographies about rising black women called "black girls' rule." Finally Trace rounds out its news outlet with its lifestyle section featuring blogs about beauty and fashion, sports news, guides to traveling African cities and information about Trace-hosted events throughout Africa.

== Trace FM ==
Trace FM is the radio section of Trace and is the means through which Trace Africa is broadcast. Trace FM is focused by country or geographical region, including TV channels, radios events and apps. The specific channels of Trace FM are listed below:

TV channels: urban, tropical, Africa, toca, mziki, naija, gospel, sports stars, prime

Radio stations: Guadalupe, Guyana, Ivory Coast, Martinique, Paris, La Reunion, Haiti

Events: Trace Live, Trace Music Star

Apps: Trace Play, Trace radio

== Trace Live ==
Trace Africa hosts events throughout the African diaspora aimed at spreading African culture and music through what is dubbed as Trace Live. Some examples of these events include:

- Yemi Alade's performance in Paris in February 2018.
- Mohbad Imole The Light Trace Live Sessions Season 3.
- African Zik Festival in the summer of 2016: the festival was one of the biggest artistic diversity meetings in the world and focused on Afro, urban, and tropical music. Some of the events at the festival included a football competition, a barbecue, tributes to artists Papa Wemba with the Viva La Musica orchestra, Peggy Tabuley, Greg Belobo, Sekouba Bamina, and Defao, fashion show, a giant concert featuring artists Charlotte Dipanda, Lady Ponce, Eddy Kenzo, Sidiki Diabate, Mabo, General Defao, Thierry Cham, Zouk Machine, Keblack, Toofan, Davido, Singuila, Mr. Leo, Jenifer Dias, Djany Magasco, Fanicko, TNT, Layannah, and Suave.
