= Pronit =

Polish chemical plant, turntable factory, in Pionki, Poland

Coordinates: 51°28′08″N 21°26′31″E

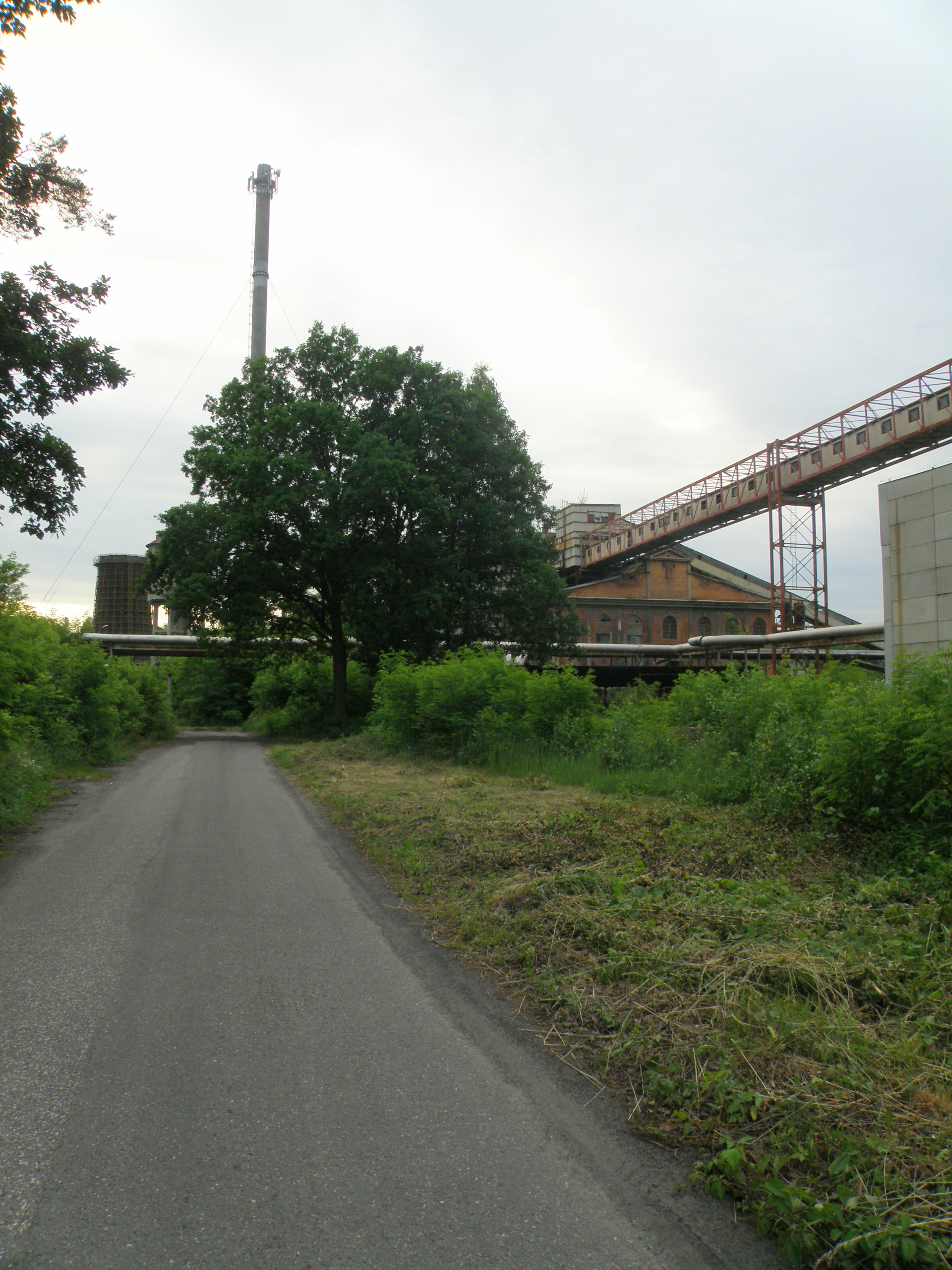
Abandoned facilities of Pronit

Pronit (Zakłady Tworzyw Sztucznych Pronit-Pionki (ZTS Pronit)) is a Polish factory of plastic materials near the town of Pionki, Radom County. Among its specialties, it includes the factory of vinyl record plates, and thus is mostly known as the original Polish record label.

Pronit originates from the factory of gunpowder and explosives established in 1922 by a village of Zagożdżon in the wilderness of the Kozienice Forest (pl:Puszcza Kozienicka). In 1932 the village was renamed to Pionki, During the interbellum period, due to government contracts Pionki prospered, as demand for explosives from its chemical plant was high. The trend continued after World War II, and by 1954 Pionki had grown into a town.

After World War II its production continued to expand and included plastics, glues, etc. It Later started the production of polyvinyl chloride and subsequently, vinyl records. Pronit pressed vinyl records under their own label, as well as for a number of Polish record labels:

- Tonpress, KAW
- Wifon
- Polton
- Veriton
- PWM Edition
- PolJazz
- Polskie Nagrania
- Savitor

From 1990 the output from the factory begun to decline and Pronit entered a period of a major crisis. In 2010 the enterprise decided to start pressing "nostalgy" vinyl plates.
