= Le chant des sirènes =

Studio album by Orelsan
- Released: 26 September 2011
- Recorded: 2010–2011
- Genre: French hip hop
- Length: 62:54
- Language: French
- Label: 3^{e} Bureau, 7th Magnitude, Wagram
- Producer: Broad Rush, Marc Chouarain, Cookin' Soul, Orelsan, Félipé Saldivia, Fred Savio, Skread

Orelsan chronology
Perdu d'avance (2009)	Le chant des sirènes (2011)	Orelsan et Gringe sont les Casseurs Flowters (2013)

Singles from Le chant des sirènes
- 1. "RaelSan" Released: May 30, 2011; 2. "Double vie" Released: June 9, 2011; 3. "Plus rien ne m'étonne" Released: July 25, 2011; 4. "Suicide social" Released: September 15, 2011; 5. "La terre est ronde" Released: December 24, 2011; 6. "Ils sont cools" Released: June 22, 2012

Le chant des sirènes is the second studio album by French rapper Orelsan, released on 26 September 2011 by 3ème Bureau, 7th Magnitude and Wagram Music.

The album entered the French Albums Chart in third place with 15,529 copies sold in its first week, and is certified double platinum by the SNEP, selling more than 200,000 copies in France to date.

== Background ==
After his debut album Perdu d'avance in 2009, Orelsan said he was "resting on his laurels" and that he had "gone through hard times".

For eight to ten months, I didn't write anything, I turned a blind eye. My first album was so personal that I didn't know how to bounce back and talk about something else. The first album, I had written six years, while there were only two years that passed. And what had I lived apart from a tour, a controversy and having banged three groupies? I do caricature, but there was nothing to tell an interesting story. I wrote Le chant des sirènes by mixing reality and fiction, a little to rid myself of all that. In the end it helped me.

— Orelsan, on the process of coming up with a theme for the album.

The album is called Le chant des sirènes (French for "the siren's song"), because it is "at an age and in an era where there are many temptations, many addicitions, a lot more than in the time of our grandparents. All my songs talk about it," explains Orelsan. In a similar fashion he explains the title of his album:

It's easy, on Facebook and Twitter, when you're a bit known, when you're not doing well, you say it, and people you don't even know come in to bring your morale back up. It's also because of this that I called my album Le chant des sirènes, compared to this thing of temptation that creates social networks.

— Orelsan, in an interview with Les Inrocks.

== Composition ==
The album deals with what happened in Orelsan's life since his first album. "I did a tour, going into show biz," he explains.

I inflicted a discipline of work on myself. I worked hard. I never went out. (...) I didn't see my friends for some time. I isolated myself at the countryside for a week. Writing, for me, is neither simple nor natural. I have to force it. It doesn't come by itself. The first stage is to find out what I'm going to talk about. Once I find the subject matter, I have to determine what I'm going to say and finally look for the rhymes. I can't do it as a hobby. On my first album, I wrote certain songs quickly like "Soirée ratée", but it's rare. On this album, I was more demanding, more ambitious.

— Orelsan, in an interview with L'Express.

In an interview with Les Inrocks, Orelsan says that he didn't know what to talk about anymore. He explains, "In my first album, I talked about the previous ten years of my life, and at the time I almost never lived at all: I did a tour, sparked a controversy and banged three groupies (laughs)." On his first album, Perdu d'avance, Orelsan wrote fourteen songs without touching up anything, and threw about thirty songs away before finding "this mix of rapping and singing, this mix of myself and someone I'm not." He also says that he introduced more fiction, something that he wouldn't do before. He continues, "I confined myself at home, I went on vacations alone. I was at times very depressed." In another interview, Orelsan explains that the album's title song "Le chant des sirènes" was "a breaking point".

I already created the beginning of the album. "Le chant des sirènes" helped me to get to the end because it talks about reality mixed with fiction. I told myself: "It's not bad to release a bit of myself and add a bit of fiction." Before I could spend 10 hours in front of a blank sheet wondering, "What am I going to do?" Now, I don't hesitate to read a book, to watch a film without feeling like stealing something from someone. I just take impression. I don't hesitate to call a friend, to ask him what he's doing. And in my head, I do a sort of interview to look for inspiration. Before, I had a sort of ego. I had to invent everything.

— Orelsan, on the song "Le chant des sirènes".

According to the rapper, the song "La petite marchande de porte-clefs" is one that "dragged on for a long time". In finding a subject matter for the song, he explains that he came across a report on the post-Olympic Games in Beijing and what happened to people who were exploited there, and also saw something on the kidnappings of children in China. He says that he imagined "the destiny of a girl my age who would've lived all that."

It started with an instrumental that I made. I make them but they rarely land on my albums. I sampled some Chinese thing. I didn't know what to say about it too much. [...] I did some research. Well, I wasn't going to the library. I read articles on the one-child policy in China, the Chinese in Paris. I tried to make credible fiction of it, without it being inflated and too factual. I made something sad and a bit wicked out of it on these people who we come across in the subway at times without knowing where they're coming from.

— Orelsan, on the song "La petite marchande des porte-clefs".

For the track "1990", which was initially called "Dans les années 1990" ("In the 1990s"), Orelsan wanted to "try and write a track today with references of the time." He says that "in these recent times, there's a tendency of returning to the rap of those years."

Orelsan describes the song "Suicide social", which was released as the album's fourth single on September 15, 2011 before the album's release, as "really a series of clichés", adding that he would have been able to make the song last 4 minutes more. In an interview, he says that talking about people "as groups, as social classes, as layers, is bullshit," and that the song is to be taken as an example of what not to do.

There's going to be reactions. But I wasn't arguing, I wasn't reacting. I'd like people to discuss [the song] amongst themselves. It's just a song. When I started writing it, it made me think of Spike Lee's movie 25th Hour. In one scene Edward Norton has a go at all of New York' social classes, except he's more violent than me. And in the end, he tells himself: "If I get angry with them, it's because I'm angry with myself." My persona, him, commits suicide at the end of the song. Nobody's ever offended by the scene from Spike Lee's movie. Why do they have to be offended by mine? Not only that, it's fiction, but not even a point of view.

— Orelsan, on the song "Suicide social".

== Singles ==
Le chant des sirènes produced 6 singles:

- "RaelSan" was released as the lead single on 30 May 2011. Its title is a reference to Raël, the founder of Raëlism. It peaked at number 77 on the French Singles Chart, and its music video was nominated for the "Music Video of the Year" award at the 2012 Victoires de la Musique award ceremony.
- "Double vie" was released as a follow-up single to "RaelSan" on 9 June 2011, but never entered the French Singles Chart.
- "Plus rien ne m'étonne" was released as the album's third single on 25 July 2011, peaking at number 46 on the French Singles Chart.
- "Suicide social" was released as the album's fourth single on 15 September 2011. It peaked at number 53 on the French Singles Chart.
- "La terre est ronde" was released as the album's fifth single on 24 December 2011. Peaking at number 9 on the French Singles Chart and at number 15 on Belgium's Wallonian Ultratop 50 Singles Chart, it was nominated for the "Best Song" award at the 2013 edition of the Trace Urban Music Awards.
- "Ils sont cools" was released as the album's sixth single on 22 June 2012. It entered the French Singles Chart at number 143, and peaked at number 66.

== Reception ==
=== Critical reception and accolades ===
Professional ratings
Review scores
Source	Rating
AllMusic	3.5/5 stars
Best Ever Albums	69/100
Fnac	4.5/5 stars
Sens Critique	6.2/10
2K Music	4/5 stars

Le chant des sirènes has received generally positive reviews from music critics. For Éric Mandel of Journal du Dimanche, Orelsan "drives the point home with a stunning song: "Suicide social". It alternates trash humour and existential questions, homage to the origins of rap and the art of storytelling." Musical blog Goûte Mes Disques says, "Le chant des sirènes appears as a light and shade: an album punctuated by some flashes of genius and, unfortunately, also by several tracks that could be described as rather ordinary." Thierry Cadet of Pure Charts says the album is "written in bitterness, sparing no one." He goes on to say that the album's title is "like a satire of our time and the younger generations."

According to Désinvolt, since Orelsan released his first album, "time did its course, the artist came of age and on Le chant des sirènes, the themes approached become more personal, more thoughtful, evolution is assumed until the end and finally it is all of his work which gains depth."

On 3 March 2012, Le chant des sirènes won the Victoire de la Musique award for Urban Music Album of the Year.

=== Commercial performance ===
The album entered the French Albums Charts in third place with 15,529 copies sold in its first week, doing much better than Perdu d'avance, which entered in 20th place with 3,365 copies sold. In its second week, Le chant des sirènes went down eight places, finding itself in 11th place with 4,668 more copies sold.

One month after release, Le chant des sirènes was certified gold in France with over 50,000 copies sold. It was certified platinum in 2012 and double platinum in 2018 by the SNEP.

== Track listing ==
No.	Title	Producer(s)	Length
1.	"RaelSan"	Skread	4:15
2.	"Le chant des sirènes"	Skread	5:47
3.	"Plus rien ne m'étonne"	Skread	3:38
4.	"Mauvaise idée"	Broad Rush	3:20
5.	"Double vie"	Skread	3:58
6.	"Finir mal"	Skread	4:48
7.	"Si seul"	Skread	4:07
8.	"Des trous dans la tête"	Skread	4:01
9.	"La petite marchande de porte-clefs"	Marc Chouarain, Orelsan	4:16
10.	"La terre est ronde"	Fred Savio	3:39
11.	"1990"	Skread	1:38
12.	"2010"	Skread	2:44
13.	"La morale"	Skread, Félipé Saldivia	4:03
14.	"Ils sont cools" (featuring Gringe)	Cookin' Soul	3:37
15.	"Suicide social"	Skread	5:41
16.	"Elle viendra quand même"	Skread	3:22
Total length:			62:54

Notes

- "Plus rien ne m'étonne" features vocals by Isleym.
- "La petite marchande de porte-clefs" features vocals by Shu Pan.

== Personnel ==
Credits for Le chant des sirènes adapted from Discogs.

- Broad Rush – Producer, instrumentation, programming
- Wahib Chehata – Photography
- Marc Chouarain – Producer, instrumentation, programming
- Cookin' Soul – Producer
- Frédéric Curier – Mixing
- Isleym – Vocals
- Orelsan – Producer, primary artist
- Shu Pan – Vocals
- Félipé Saldivia – Producer, instrumentation
- Fred Savio – Producer, instrumentation, programming
- Skread – Producer, instrumentation, programming
- David Soudan – Mixing
- Dany Synthé – Synthesizer
- David Tomaszewski – Art direction
- Mr Viktor – Scratching

== Chart performance ==
=== Weekly charts ===
Chart (2011)	Peak position
Belgian Albums (Ultratop Wallonia)	10
French Albums (SNEP)	3
Swiss Albums (Schweizer Hitparade)	32

=== Year-end charts ===
Chart (2011)	Position
French Albums (SNEP)	87
Chart (2012)	Position
Belgian Albums (Ultratop Wallonia)	97
French Albums (SNEP)	76
Chart (2022)	Position
Belgian Albums (Ultratop Wallonia)	145

== Certifications ==
Region	Certification	Certified units/sales
France (SNEP)	3× Platinum	300,000^{‡}
^{‡} Sales+streaming figures based on certification alone.
