= Nessbeal =

French rapper (born 1978)

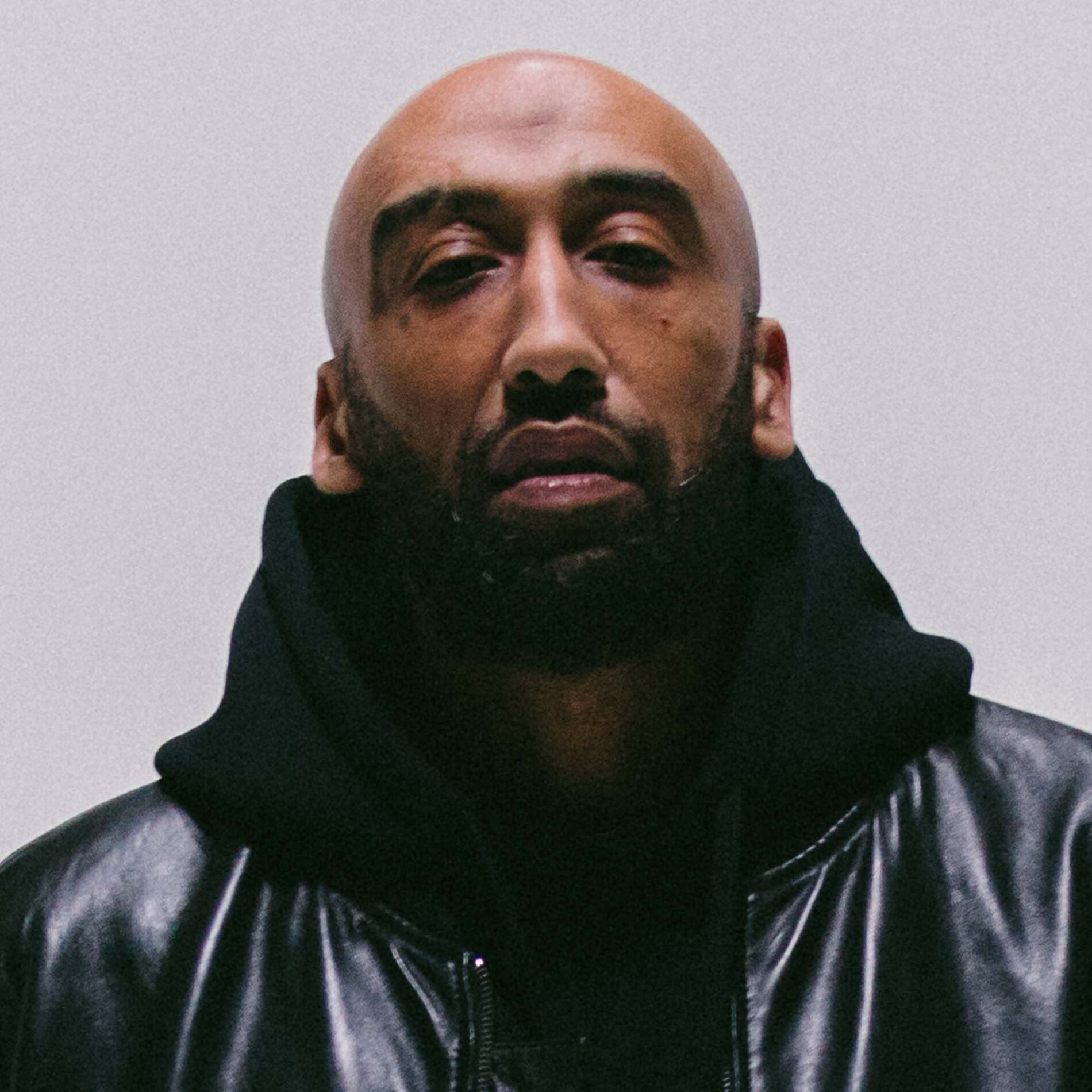

Background information
- Also known as: Ness, NessBeal, NE2S, N.E.2.S.
- Born: Nabil Sahli; 16 August 1978 (age 48); Boulogne-Billancourt, France
- Genres: Hip hop
- Occupation: Rapper
- Years active: 1996–present
- Label: 7th Magnitude

Nabil Sahli (born 16 August 1978), better known by his stage name Nessbeal, is a French rapper of Moroccan origins. Nessbeal started earlier as NessBeal under which he released his debut studio album La mélodie des briques. He is currently signed to 7th Magnitude, founded by French record producer Skread.

== Career ==
Nabil Sahli was born in Boulogne-Billancourt, in the western suburbs of Paris, to a Moroccan family. When his parents divorced, he went to live with his mother in difficult conditions in Hautes Noués in Villiers-sur-Marne, Val-de-Marne (an eastern suburb of Paris); his father remained in Boulogne-Billancourt. In 1996, he formed the rap and hip hop group Dicidens, a trio also including French-Martinique rapper Zesau and Korias. The group recorded various maxis in 1999 and 2000 and were signed to the independent record label Magma (later known as Paire d'As). He cooperated with the band Lunatic. Their album HLM rezidants released in 2004, sold 10,000 copies and was their first chart success, reaching number 78 on the SNEP French albums chart, where it stayed for 3 weeks. Nessbeal was also involved with the collective 92I along with Lunatic, la Malekal Morte, Sir Doum's and others, and he took part in Booba's first two releases.

After growing dissatisfied with the progress of his career in 92I, he left and signed with the label Nouvelle Donne, where he released two solo albums. La mélodie des briques in 2006 was his solo debut and peaked at #24 on the French charts. It was followed by the more commercially successful Rois sans couronne in 2008, which reportedly sold 20,000 copies and peaked at #18.

In 2010 he moved record labels to 7th Magnitude and released NE2S, produced by Skread. The album became his biggest success, with many collaborations with Orelsan, La Fouine, Bradley Jones, Isleym and Indila. With the popularity of the single "À chaque jour suffit sa peine", NE2S sold close to 30,000 copies, peaking at number 13 in the albums chart. In November 2011 came his fourth album and the second with 7th Magnitude under the title Sélection Naturelle with collaborations with rapper Soprano, La Fouine, Mister You, Mélissa Nkonda. It was also produced by Skread.

Nessbeal contributed some materials in Mister You's album MDR Mec de rue 2 with the track "Mesdames, messieurs". He was involved also with some collective projects like Street Lourd Hall Stars, Illicite projet and Talents fâchés etc. He also had two "fights" with Médine and Youssoupha. After Sélection naturelle, he announced that he was taking a break from rapping, but by the end of 2013 announced he was preparing a new release in addition to composing for the soundtrack of the film La Marche.

== Discography ==
=== Studio albums ===
- La mélodie des briques (2006)
- Rois sans couronne (2008)
- NE2S (2010)
- Sélection naturelle (2011)
- Zonard des étoiles (2022)
