= Trace Urban =

French music video television channel

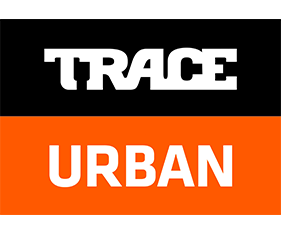
- Country: France
- Broadcast area: International
- Headquarters: Clichy-la-Garenne, France

Programming
- Picture format: 16:9 1080p (HDTV)

Ownership
- Owner: TPG Capital; Trace Partners
- Sister channels: Trace Africa; Trace Gospel; Trace Sport Stars; Trace Toca; Trace Caribbean; Trace Brasil; Trace Mziki; Trace Naija; Trace Muzika; Trace Kitoko; Trace Ayiti; Trace Jama; Trace Vanilla Islands; Trace Mboa; Trace Afrikora; Trace FM

History
- Launched: 23 April 2003; 23 years ago
- Founder: Olivier Laouchez

Links
- Website: http://trace.tv/trace-urban/

Availability

Terrestrial
- DStv: Channel 325
- Zuku TV: Channel 747
- LG Channels: Channel 374
- Cignal TV Philippines: Channel 151 (planned)
- TrueVisions Thailand: Channel 345 (planned)

Trace Urban (formerly MCM Africa then Trace TV) is a French pay-TV music video television channel, that is owned by TPG Capital. It is the parent channel of the various Trace music channels like Trace Africa and Trace Latina. It is the third most distributed French television channel in the world, dedicated to urban contemporary music and cultures (R&B, hip-hop, dancehall, etc.) targeting an audience aged 15–34. Trace Urban the second music channel in France and the most popular channel broadcast in more than 60 countries in the world. Along with airing music videos, the channel also features interviews of renowned artists sometimes, promoting their upcoming albums or concert tours with interviews called 'Fact Check' and 'Skip Skip'`.

== History ==
=== MCM Africa ===
Founded in 1994, under the name of MCM Africa, it was a variation of the French chain MCM belonging to Lagardère. It was sold in 2002 to Olivier Laouchez, former boss of the hip-hop label Sector Ä.

=== Trace TV ===
On April 27, 2003, Olivier Laouchez renames MCM Africa into Trace TV which became the first international channel dedicated to urban music, it is experiencing rapid international expansion, with different feeds present in 60 countries.

In 2006, the channel received a HOT BIRD Award for the best music television in Europe. In 2009, the chain opened an office in New York.

=== Trace Urban ===
On December 15, 2010, Trace TV became Trace Urban. The Trace group launched Trace Radio, an urban radio from the Goom digital radio package.

On 27 June 2022, Trace Urban was launched on the British Freeview platform alongside Trace Latina and Trace Brazuca, streaming on channel 271 as part of Channelbox's range of music channels. The logo also underwent a change, making it a full rectangle with 'Trace Urban' rather than the previous where the “urban” bit was smaller. They also rebranded slogans and dumped 'Playlist' programming with Sounds of Trace and Urban Vibes.

== Trace Urban Music Awards ==
In 2013, the first edition of the Trace Urban Music Awards took place, an award ceremony for the best French-speaking urban artists. Trace launches its new 100% social and 100% personalized website. On the new website, the user benefits from a personalized recommendation of content according to their tastes and social profile, thanks to optimal use of Facebook's Open Graph.

== Trace Music Stars ==
Trace launched Trace Stars (renamed Trace Music Star) in South Africa, a phone talent talent competition with Wyclef Jean as sponsor. In 2014, the first edition of Airtel Trace Music Star took place, a competition to detect musical talents by pan-African telephone, of which Akon is the sponsor.

The year 2015 saw the birth of the first edition of Trace Music Star in France and in the French overseas departments, a digital cast in search of the next signature of the Wati B label. In 2016, the second edition of Airtel Trace Music Star was sponsored by Keri Hilson.
