= 7th Magnitude =

French record label

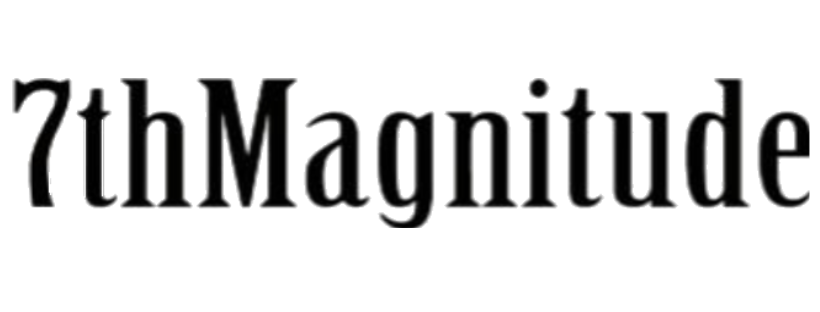
- Founded: 2006
- Founder: Matthieu Le Carpentier; Abdoulaye Doucouré
- Status: Active
- Distributors: 3^{e} Bureau; Sony Music France; Wagram Music
- Genre: Hip hop; R&B; pop
- Country of origin: France
- Location: Hérouville-Saint-Clair, Lower Normandy

7th Magnitude (French: Septième magnitude) is a record label founded by French record producer Matthieu "Skread" Le Carpentier and co-founder Abdoulaye "Ablaye" Doucouré. The label is known for having signed French rappers Orelsan, Nessbeal and Gringe.

== Activity ==
7th Magnitude has been instrumental in launching the career of Orelsan, with Skread producing and releasing Perdu d'avance and the hugely successful Le chant des sirènes, which is certified platinum in France. The label has also released Nessbeal's NE2S and Sélection naturelle, as well as singer Isleym's debut studio album Où ça nous mène.

== Artists ==
- Casseurs Flowters
- Gringe
- Orelsan
- Skread
- Celiman

== Releases ==
Year	Artist	Release	Type	Release date
2005	Skread	Instrus	Compilation	22 March 2005
2007	El Matador	Parti de rien	Album	10 September 2007
2008	Orelsan	"Changement"	Single	13 October 2008
2009	Orelsan	Perdu d'avance	Album	16 February 2009
2009	Isleym	"Ma solitude" (featuring Nessbeal)	Single	2 March 2009
2010	Nessbeal	"Ça bouge pas"	Single	31 May 2010
2010	Nessbeal	"À chaque jour suffit sa peine"	Single	31 May 2010
2010	Nessbeal	NE2S	Album	14 June 2010
2010	Nessbeal	"Ma grosse" (featuring Orelsan)	Single	14 June 2010
2010	Isleym	Avec le temps	EP	15 November 2010
2011	Orelsan	"RaelSan"	Single	30 May 2011
2011	Orelsan	"Double vie"	Single	9 June 2011
2011	Orelsan	"Plus rien ne m'étonne"	Single	25 July 2011
2011	Nessbeal	"L'histoire d'un mec qui coule"	Single	16 August 2011
2011	Orelsan	"Suicide social"	Single	15 September 2011
2011	Orelsan	Le chant des sirènes	Album	26 September 2011
2011	Nessbeal	"Force et honneur"	Single	6 October 2011
2011	Nessbeal	"Gunshot"	Single	14 October 2011
2011	Isleym	"Avec le temps"	Single	8 November 2011
2011	Nessbeal	Sélection naturelle	Album	21 November 2011
2011	Orelsan	"La terre est ronde"	Single	24 December 2011
2012	Orelsan	"Ils sont cools" (featuring Gringe)	Single	22 June 2012
2013	Casseurs Flowters	"Bloqué"	Single	3 July 2013
2013	Skread	Instrus 2.0	Compilation	8 July 2013
2013	Isleym	"Petit bateau"	Single	21 October 2013
2013	Casseurs Flowters	Orelsan et Gringe sont les Casseurs Flowters	Album	15 November 2013
2014	Isleym	Où ça nous mène	Album	21 April 2014
2014	Isleym	"Oublie-moi"	Single	23 April 2014
2015	Casseurs Flowters	"À l'heure où je me couche"	Single	29 October 2015
2015	Casseurs Flowters	Comment c'est loin	Soundtrack	9 December 2015
2018	Gringe	Enfant Lune	Album	2 November 2018
2021	Orelsan	Civilisation	Album	19 November 2021
2024	Gringe	Hypersensible	Album	19 September 2024
2025	Orelsan	La fuite en avant	Album	7 November 2025
