= Attacks on journalists during the Israel–Hezbollah conflict (2023–present) =

Series of attacks against journalists

Attack on journalists in Lebanon
- Part of the Killing of journalists in the Gaza war and the Israel–Hezbollah conflict (2023–present)
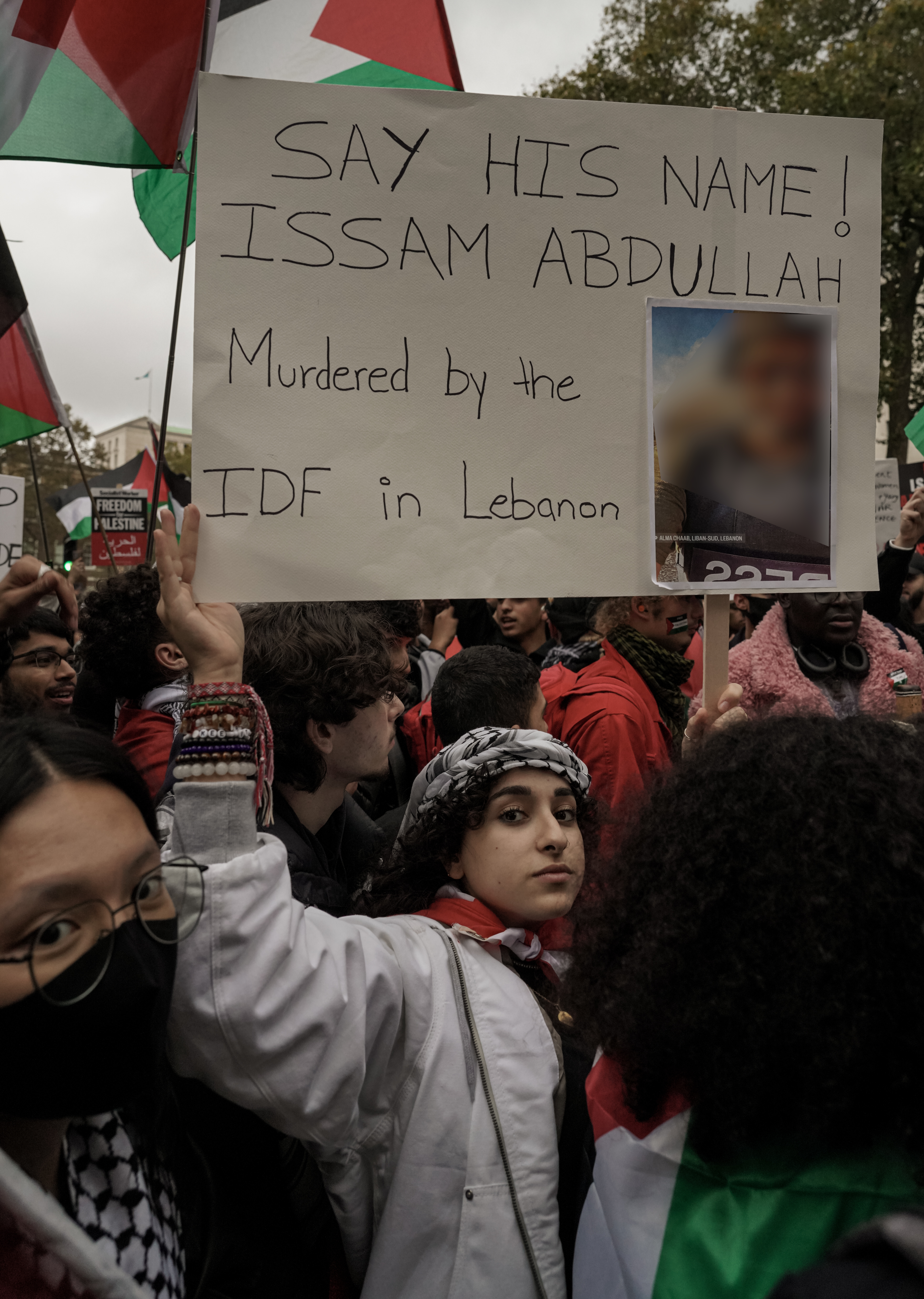
- A protestor holding up a sign of Issam Abdallah during mass demonstrations in London, 29 October 2023
- Location: Lebanon and Syria
- Date: 13 October 2023 – present (3 years, 2 weeks and 4 days)
- Weapons: Missiles, tank guns
- Deaths: 14 journalists, 3 civilians
- Injuries: 18+
- Perpetrator: (Israel) Israeli Defence Force

Since the beginning of the Israel–Hezbollah conflict on 8 October 2023, 22 media workers have been killed and at least 15 others injured in multiple incidents throughout Lebanon. Human rights organizations, including Human Rights Watch (HRW), Amnesty International, Reporters Without Borders (RSF), and the Committee to Protect Journalists (CPJ), have documented these incidents. Some Israeli strikes on clearly identifiable journalists have been described as apparently deliberate attacks on civilians, potentially constituting war crimes under international humanitarian law. Meanwhile, Hezbollah-affiliated actors have been intimidating and attacking reporters in areas under their influence, as well as hacking private media sites.

== Incidents ==
=== 2023 ===
==== 13 October ====
While a group of Reuters, AFP and Al Jazeera journalists were transmitting a live video feed of an IDF outpost over a kilometre from Aalma ech Chaab, two tank rounds fired directly hit the group. The first killed Reuters photojournalist Issam Abdallah. The second strike was much more powerful and ignited the Al Jazeera vehicle, a white Toyota, which Al Jazeera journalists Carmen Joukhadar and Elie Brakhya, as well as their AFP colleague Dylan Collins were standing next to. AFP photographer Christina Assi was also critically injured and had her leg amputated. Lebanon's army has said the IDF fired the missile that killed Abdallah. Another Reuters reporter at the scene said Abdallah was killed by projectiles fired from the direction of Israel. His last post on Instagram, posted a week before he was killed, was a photograph of Shireen Abu Akleh, a Palestinian journalist for Al Jazeera who had been killed by Israel in 2022.

A February 2024 report by the United Nations Interim Force in Lebanon concluded that an Israeli tank killed Abadallah when it fired at "clearly identifiable journalists", and that this broke international law. The report "assessed that there was no exchange of fire across the Blue Line at the time of the incident", with no records of any exchange of fire across the border for the 40 minutes before the tank firing. The Israel Defense Forces responded to the United Nations report by claiming that Hezbollah attacked them, so tank fire was used to retaliate.

==== 13 November ====
Another group of Lebanese journalists were hit by a strike meters away from them while reporting in the town of Yaroun The incident was filmed live by Al Jadeed. The anchor was heard speaking to the live anchor Rif Akil after the strike. The anchor said, "It's clear the rocket has fallen just a few metres away from you It's clear this is a direct strike on journalists operating in Yaroun." as the camera filmed the site of the attack. Only minor injuries were reported.

==== 21 November ====
While an Al-Mayadeen crew was covering the latest developments on the Lebanese-Israeli border near Tayr Harfa in southern Lebanon, an Israeli tank hit reporter Farah Omar and cameraman Rabih Maamari from the Hezbollah-affiliated Al Mayadeen TV. The artillery shelling led to the immediate deaths of Omar and Maamari. A guide alongside the journalists was also killed. Al Mayadeen said the attack was deliberate because of the channel's pro-Palestinian views.

==== 23 December ====
An Al-Manar cameraman was injured in the eye after an IDF attack on a road in the al-Khardali area where correspondents of MTV and the state-owned National News Agency were also passing. The IDF heavily bombarded the Deir Mimas-Khardali River area and stopped civilians from passing the road by shelling close to the vehicles passing.

==== 26 December ====
Hezbollah's anti-tank missile hit next to Channel 13 News team while interviewing farmer at Dovev, in an article following a prior Hezbollah assault that killed a 56-year-old employee of the Israel Electric Corporation, and injured five workers who were repairing electric lines.

=== 2024 ===
==== 23–25 September ====
The IDF conducted an extensive bombing operation, codenamed Northern Arrows, on sites in Lebanon. During that, the editor-in-chief of Miraya International Network was injured while he was preparing for an interview after an Israeli missile crashed through his window in the Beqaa Valley. A Lebanese online editor for Al Mayadeen Hadi Al-Sayyed also died from wounds he sustained after an attack at his home. On 25 September, Al Manar photojournalist Kamel Karaki died in a strike that targeted his hometown of Qantara.

==== 1 October ====
An Israeli airstrike in Damascus, Syria killed three civilians and injured nine others, according to the state-controlled Syrian Arab News Agency. Among the dead was Syrian television anchor Safaa Ahmad.

==== 25 October ====
An Israeli strike on a compound housing 18 journalists from at least seven media organizations with a courtyard containing cars clearly marked with "press" in Hasbaya killed an engineer and a cameraman for Al Mayadeen and another cameraman for Al-Manar, and injured three others. The attack was the deadliest on journalists in Lebanon since the conflict began.

=== 2026 ===
Ali Shoeib (also spelled Shuaib) of Al Manar was killed in a targeted Israeli airstrike in southern Lebanon on 28 March 2026. Al Mayadeen reported that two journalists working for them named Fatima and Mohammed Ftouni were also killed in the attack. Israel claimed to have targeted Shoeib for being a Hezbollah intelligence operative "without providing evidence" per the Associated Press.

In June 2026, Sawab fact-checker Alaa Salman died after having been in a coma for a month following an Israeli airstrike on her home.

=== List of attacks on journalists by Lebanese residents ===
- 9 October 2023: Italian journalist Lucia Goracci and cameraman Marco Nicois were attacked in Lebanon while covering the aftermath of an Israeli airstrike in Jiyeh, resulting in the death of their local driver from a heart attack moments after.
- 19 June 2024: Hezbollah critic Rami Naim was assaulted by 20 armed men, allegedly affiliated with Hezbollah, in the Verdun neighborhood in Beirut. He claimed that it was an attempt of murder.
- 30 July 2024: After the Assassination of Fuad Shukr, reporters and journalists faced hostility while covering the incident, namely Al Jazeera and MTV, who were attacked live by Hezbollah supporters that were at the site of the raid in Haret Hreik and prevented them from covering the event.
- 29 September 2024: CNN Turk correspondent Fulya Ozturk was attacked by a passerby in Beirut as while reporting live from following the killing of Hezbollah leader Hassan Nasrallah.
- 10 October 2024: TV100 reporter Sertaç Murat Koç and news cameraman Yusuf Ziya Mert were assaulted and prevented from filming live after an Israeli airstrike on Beirut that killed 22 people after being asked about their nationality.
- 2 October 2024: Two Belgian journalists working for the independent broadcasting network VTM were injured after they were assaulted and shot at in Beirut by a group of men who accused them of working for Israel. The attack occurred while they were attempting to cover an explosion in the city.
- 27 January 2025: A correspondent and a cameraman working for LBCI were attacked by a group of men while reporting in the area between Deir Mimas and Khardali.

== Investigations of the 13 October attack ==
=== Reporters Without Borders investigation ===
During the conflict, Reporters Without Borders (RSF) claimed that the Israeli army had deliberately targeted journalists. An RSF investigation said that Israel had targeted journalists in missile strikes on 13 October that killed Reuters reporter Issam Abdallah and injured four others. These two Israeli missile strikes, 30 seconds apart, hit a group of seven journalists in southern Lebanon who were reporting on the fighting between Israel and Hezbollah. In a video, the journalists are seen wearing vests and helmets identifying them as "PRESS". The marking was also present on the roof of their car, which exploded after being hit by the second missile. According to the Council of Europe, the intentional targeting of journalists constitutes a war crime.

=== Reuters and TNO ===
The Netherlands Organisation for Applied Scientific Research (TNO), which tests and analyses munitions and weapons, assisted Reuters by examining the material collected at the site of the explosion of 13 October and found that the piece of metal was the fin of a 120 mm tank round fired 1.34 km away from the border fired from a smoothbore tank gun. The TNO said that satellite images and a photo taken by Abdallah showed no signs of any previous attacks in their area which determines that the tailfin was significant investigating the attack.

The TNO analyzed the recording from the Al Jazeera live feed of both strikes and a video recording from the Italian broadcaster RAI which shows the launch point of the second strike. Journalists from RAI were filming the cross-border shelling the same day of the attack from Alma ech Chaab where their camera was turned towards the sound of the blast. Using the audio from the Al Jazeera broadcast they determined that the rounds were fired 1,343 metres away from the reporters and said that the sound signatures of both samples of the strikes matched indicating that the two tank rounds were fired from the same position.

=== Amnesty International ===
Amnesty International and the Human Rights Watch held a joint press conference in the Lebanese capital, Beirut, on 7 December where they revealed their findings of their investigations into the attack that killed Issam Abdallah and wounded six others on 13 October. They concluded that the group of journalists were hit by a tank round and said that it was a direct attack on civilians and were visibly identifiable as journalists which they called for it to be investigated as a war crime. After analysis they found that the firing point was at an Israeli position close to the village of Jordeikh which was positioned east of the journalists.

=== United Nations investigation ===
A February 2024 report by the United Nations Interim Force in Lebanon concluded that an Israeli tank killed Abadallah when it fired at "clearly identifiable journalists", and that this broke international law. The report "assessed that there was no exchange of fire across the Blue Line at the time of the incident", with no records of any exchange of fire across the border for the 40 minutes before the tank firing.

== Reaction ==
Speaking about Abdallah's death, Israeli military spokesperson Richard Hecht said, "we're very sorry", but did not confirm that Israeli shells had hit the journalists. The Israeli military said it using tank and artillery fire in the vicinity to deter a potential infiltration from Lebanon at the time Issam Abdallah was killed. They stated that their actions were in response to Hezbollah fire along the Israel–Lebanon border, and the incident is currently being reviewed. The Israeli army also initiated an investigation into the circumstances surrounding Abdallah's death.

Michael Downey, a journalist who works for The New York Times and the British Broadcasting Corporation (BBC), commented on a video taken shortly before the incident: "No warning shot; that was intentional".

Lebanon denounced the killing of Reuters journalist Issam Abdallah, who was killed during an Israeli artillery strike aimed at a group of reporters. Following Abdallah's death, the Lebanese army conducted an on-site assessment, affirming that Israel had launched the missile that killed him. Lebanon's Foreign Ministry has instructed its mission to the UN in Beirut to express deep concerns regarding what they perceive as a clear infringement on freedom of opinion and press. Additionally, Lebanon is preparing to file a formal complaint with the UN Security Council, accusing Israel of intentionally causing Abdallah's death.

== Casualties ==
Killed
Injured

| Date | Name | Description | News agency | Ref. |
|---|---|---|---|---|
| 2023-10-13 | Carmen Joukhadar | A Lebanese reporter who sustained major injuries and was hospitalized for weeks | Al Jazeera | |
| 2023-10-13 | Elie Brakhya | A Lebanese photojournalist who sustained major injuries and was hospitalized for weeks | Al Jazeera | |
| 2023-10-13 | Christina Assi | A Lebanese photographer who sustained life-threatening injuries and remained in intensive care for weeks and had her leg amputated | AFP | |
| 2023-10-13 | Dylan Collins | An American photographer who was injured in the second strike while trying to help Assi. | AFP | |
| 2023-10-13 | Issam Abdallah | A Lebanese videographer who was immediately killed in an Israeli artillery strike that targeted the group of reporters. | Reuters | |
| 2023-10-13 | Maher Nazeh | An Iraqi photojournalist who sustained minor injuries | Reuters | |
| 2023-10-13 | Thaer al-Sudani | An Iraqi photojournalist who sustained minor injuries | Reuters | |
| 2023-11-13 | Issam Mawassi | A Lebanese videographer sustained minor injuries when the IDF attacked a group of journalists in Yaroun. | Al Jadeed | |
| 2023-11-21 | Farah Omar | A Lebanese correspondent killed in an Israeli airstrike in the Tayr Harfa area. | Al Mayadeen | |
| 2023-11-21 | Rabih Al Maamari | A Lebanese cameraman working for Al Mayadeen was killed in an Israeli airstrike in the Tayr Harfa area. | Al Mayadeen | |
| 2023-11-21 | Hussein Aqeel | Civilian who was alongside the Al Mayadeen journalists who was their local guide. | (Civilian) | |
| 2023-12-23 | Khodor Markiz | A Lebanese cameraman who was injured in the eye after an IDF attack near his vehicle. | Al Manar | |
| 2024-9-23 | Fadi Boudiya | A Lebanese journalist injured after an Israeli missile struck his home. | Miraya International Network | |
| 2024-9-23 | Hadi Al-Sayyed | A Lebanese online editor for Al Mayadeen died from wounds he sustained after an attack at his home. | Al Mayadeen | |
| 2024-9-25 | Kamel Karaki | A Lebanese photojournalist who was killed in his home town. | Al Manar | |
| 2024-10-01 | Safaa Ahmad | A Syrian TV anchor who died in an Israeli airstrike in Damascus alongside two civilians. | Syrian Arab News Agency | |
| 2024-10-02 | Robin Ramaekers | A Belgian journalist who suffered facial injuries after being assaulted by a group of men in Beirut. | VTM | |
| 2024-10-02 | Stijn De Smet | A Belgian journalist who was shot on his leg in the same attack. | VTM | |
| 2024-10-25 | Ghassan Najjar | A Lebanese cameraman killed in an airstrike on a residential compound in Hasbaya. | Al Mayadeen | |
| 2024-10-25 | Mohammed Rida | A Lebanese engineer killed in the airstrike in Hasbaya. | Al Mayadeen | |
| 2024-10-25 | Wissam Qassim | A Lebanese cameraman killed in the airstrike in Hasbaya. | Al-Manar | |
| 2024-12-3 | Ali Hassan Ashour | A Lebanese radio journalist killed in an unspecified time and location. | Al-Nour | |
| 2025-01-26 | Joel Maroun | A Lebanese reporter shot at by the IDF covering the return of the people of Kfar Kila to their town. | Russia Today | |
| 2026-03-09 | Haitham Moussawi | A Lebanese photojournalist injured by shrapnel in a strike on a building in Beirut's southern suburbs while reporting on damage | Al Akhbar | |
| 2026-03-13 | Kwanat Hajou | A Lebanese photojournalist injured while reporting on an attack in the town of Abbassieh, southern Lebanon | (Freelance) | |
| 2026-03-18 | Mohamad Sherri | A Lebanese anchor killed by an Israeli airstrike on a residential building in Zuqaq al-Blat, Beirut (along with his wife; several family members injured) | Al-Manar | |
| 2026-03-18 | Yasser Sherri | A Lebanese editor injured in the strike that killed his father Mohamad Sherri | Aletejah TV | |
| 2026-03-19 | Steve Sweeney | A British journalist who sustained minor injuries in an Israeli strike near the Qasmiya Bridge | Russia Today | |
| 2026-03-19 | Ali Rida | A Lebanese cameraman injured alongside Sweeny | Russia Today | |
| 2026-03-25 | Hussein Hammoud | A Lebanese photojournalist killed in an Israeli airstrike while reporting in Nabatieh | Al-Manar | |
| 2026-03-28 | Fatima Ftouni | A Lebanese journalist killed in four Israeli airstrikes against a press vehicle in Jezzine | Al Mayadeen | |
| 2026-03-28 | Mohammed Ftouni | A Lebanese photojournalist killed in four Israeli airstrikes against a press vehicle in Jezzine | Al Mayadeen | |
| 2026-03-28 | Ali Shuaib | A Lebanese journalist killed in four Israeli airstrikes against a press vehicle in Jezzine | Al-Manar | |
| 2026-04-22 | Amal Khalil | A Lebanese journalist killed after an Israeli strike on the building she was in, being stuck in the rubble and medical services prevented from reaching her by Israeli gunfire | Al Akhbar | |
| 2026-04-22 | Zeinab Faraj | Severely wounded alongside Khalil | (Freelance) | |

== See also ==
- Killing of journalists in the Gaza war
- Israeli war crimes
- Issam Abdallah
