= Tunisian diaspora =

Tunisian emigrants and their descendants

The Tunisian diaspora refers to people of Tunisian origin living outside that country. It is the direct result of the strong rate of emigration which Tunisia has experienced since its independence in 1956. In the 1960s and 70s, the favourable economic situation in France and Europe increased the phenomenon. The beginning of the 1980s saw the clear development of a Tunisian community in Europe as a result of the large number of people.

== Population ==
In 2014 the number of Tunisians residing abroad was numbered at 1,282,371 individuals, of which 87% were living in Europe. However, this official figure appears to be lower than reality because of the inadequate recording of migration statistics. Thus it is not rare to discover a single data point represents all the members of a family or to discover duplicates. Among the citizens which are underrepresented in the statistics are the third generation in France (according to one estimate, only one in ten of these have been recorded) and the children of mixed-nationality parents. The illegal immigrants (very numerous in Italy for example) are by definition not included in the official statistics.

750,000 have settled in France - one of the most important foreign communities in the country - and two thirds of them hold double citizenship. They are concentrated mostly in the large cities (40% in Paris, 12% in Lyon and 8% in Marseille, with smaller communities in Nice, Bordeaux, Toulouse, Strasbourg, and Lille). Sonia Mabrouk connects this clumping phenomenon with the urban origin of the Tunisian migrants (Tunis and the littoral), but also with the nature of the different waves of migration. Thus the 1970s mainly saw the arrival of migrants from the south of Tunisia. These settled in the Rhône Valley and at Paris which offered the greatest number of opportunities for employment and created connections with their places of origin, which subsequently encouraged other migrants to settle in the same places. According to INSEE, 1.4% of children born in 2011 in Metropolitan France (i.e. 11,466 of 792,996) had a father born in Tunisia, with the greatest proportion in the departments of Alpes-Maritimes (8.6%), Var (4.5%), Seine-Saint-Denis (3.9%), Rhône (3.7%), Val-de-Marne (3.4%), and Bouches-du-Rhône (2.4%).

In Germany Tunisians are dispersed throughout the country in many medium-sized cities and villages especially in the states Lower Saxony, North Rhine Westphalia, Bavaria, Hessen and Baden Württemberg. The Köln-Bonn region has the most significant number of Tunisians with about 7.000 Tunisians residing in the two cities and their surroundings. The Braunschweig Region, which has a significant presence of Tunisians, estimating 5.850 Tunisians, with most of the population concentrated in the cities Braunschweig, Wolfsburg and Salzgitter. Braunschweig is a partner city of Sousse and Wolfsburg is a partner city of Jendouba, making the area a significant location for Tunisians to migrate to in Germany. The Rhine-Ruhr region has a population of around 4.500 Tunisians. The Rhine-Main Metropolitan has 3.200 Tunisians with majority of the community in Frankfurt, Wiesbaden and Offenbach. Another region with a sizeable Tunisian community is Rhine-Neckar with Ludwigshafen and Mannheim having the most number of tunisians in this region. The cities Cologne, Berlin, Braunschweig, Bonn, Hamburg and Munich have the largest Tunisian communities in Germany.

Number of Tunisians in larger cities
City	People
Cologne	4.452
Berlin	3.433
Braunschweig	2.578
Hamburg	1.791
Bonn	1.774
Munich	1.240
Wolfsburg	1.162
Hanover	1.037
Stuttgart	976
Salzgitter	745
Frankfurt	657
Düsseldorf	459
Mannheim	423
Dortmund	415
Essen	406

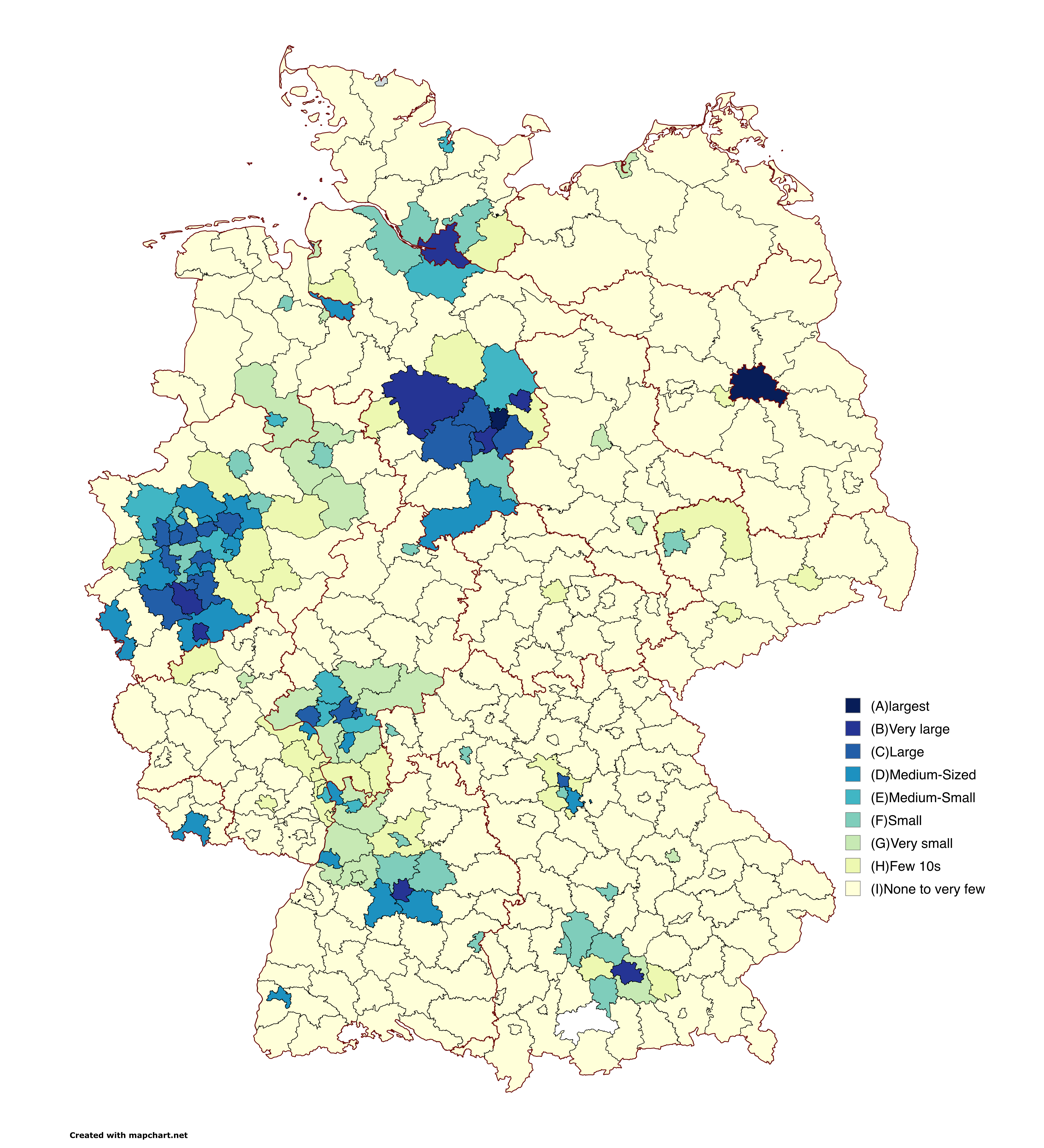
Distribution of Tunisians in Germany

There are 110,385 Tunisians in the other Arab countries, 44,195 in North America, 3359 in Subsaharan Africa and 2365 in Asia (excepting the Arab countries); 514 Tunisians are accounted for in Australia.

Country	Total
Europe	1,942,000
France	1,338,000
Italy	370,000
Germany	188,000
Belgium and Luxembourg	38,000
Switzerland	23,600
Turkey	20,000
United Kingdom and Ireland	13,400
Netherlands	11,900
Sweden	10,000
Austria and Croatia and Slovakia and Slovenia	9,200
Spain	3,722
Russia and Ukraine	1,851
Norway	1,624
Romania	1,555
Denmark	1,420
Poland	1,340
Finland	1,219
Czech	1,125
Greece	981
Hungary	437
North Africa and Middle East	231,085
Libya	83,633
United Arab Emirates	34,500
Qatar	31,500
Saudi Arabia	28,500
Algeria	20,300
Oman	8,000
Morocco	5,300
Egypt	3,600
Kuwait	3,500
Syria	2,300
Bahrain	1,605
Lebanon	1,323
Jordan	950
Americas	65,000
Canada	40,000
United States	15.720
Subsaharan Africa	3,359
Ivory Coast	1,991
Senegal	1,110
South Africa	349
Gabon	298
Mali	216
Asia	3,652
Japan	778
Australia	514
Indonesia, Malaysia, Singapore, Thailand, Philippines	497
China	279
Total	2,625,000
Source :https://www.webdo.tn/fr/actualite/national/les-tunisiens-a-l-etranger-combien-sont-ils/204755

== Demographics ==
Statistics of the Office of Tunisians Abroad show more than 128,000 Tunisian families in Europe with a concentration in France and Germany. Young Tunisians (less than 16 years of age) represent 25% of the Tunisian community abroad. Thus there is currently a rejuvenation of the Tunisian diaspora which is now in its third generation. Women represent nearly 26% of the total community. In France, their percentage is estimated at 38.2%. The portion of the diaspora who are over 60 years old is around 7%.

Originally, the largest part of the Tunisians in Europe worked in sectors requiring minimal qualifications. In effect the migrants of the 1960s and 70s were less educated (mostly farmers or manual labourers).

Subsequently, the majority of Tunisians settled in France have worked in the service sector (hotels, restaurants or retail) or have headed small businesses. In 2008, Tunisia became the first of the Maghreb countries to sign a management agreement concerning the flow of migrants, at the impetus of President Nicolas Sarkozy: it provides easy access for almost 9,000 Tunisian students enrolled in French institutions, but also almost 500 titres de séjour (residency permits) for highly qualified individuals so that they can acquire experience in France, valid for a maximum of six years. In the Arab World the Tunisian population is mostly made up of very highly qualified individuals while labourers and other unskilled individuals form the majority in Asian countries like India, Pakistan, and Afghanistan. In 2025, a note from the Immigration Observatory in France notes that integration, particularly economic, is difficult, as are the expulsions of Tunisian undocumented immigrants.

Employment of Tunisians Abroad in hundreds (2011)
Area	Total
Education and research	2,083
Architecture	1,938
Medicine and pharmacology	893
IT	381
Legal	89
Business	1,105
Other	1,860
Total	8,348
Region	Number Employed
Europe	4,194
Americas	1,609
Arab World	1,226
Africa	136
Asia	68
Australia	11
Total	7,243
Sources : Office of Tunisians Abroad

== Economic impact ==
The contribution of Tunisians abroad encapsulates the projects which they support directly or indirectly in Tunisia. According to the Office of Tunisians Abroad, there were more than 8,845 such projects between 1987 and 2004, for a total investment of around 321 million dinar, generating 39,381 jobs, principally in services (64%) and industry (26%):

- 5,649 projects related to services mobilised 140.1 million dinars and generated 17,397 jobs;
- 2,423 projects in the industrial sector with 133.7 million in investment and 20,513 employed;
- 773 projects in the agricultural sector for 47.2 million dinars of investment and 1,471 employed.

According to the Office of Tunisians Abroad, the Tunisians abroad make average of 1.1 billion dinars worth of transfers every year, 76% in the form of money transfers, which constitutes the fourth largest source of currency for the country, representing 5% of the GDP and 23% of national savings. But, although these transfers increase by 8.9% per year, the importance of this source of income has been decreasing continuously since 1996 and the number of projects created by Tunisians abroad has seemed to stagnate.

== Notable persons of Tunisian descent ==
Ghali (Italy), Claudia Cardinale (Italy), Salah Mejri (United States), Max Azria (United States), M. Salah Baouendi (United States), Mustapha Tlili (United States), Ferrid Kheder (United States), Mounir Laroussi (United States), Oussama Mellouli (United States), Leila Ben Youssef (United States), Bushido (rapper) (Germany), Loco Dice (Germany), Sami Allagui (Germany), Änis Ben-Hatira (Germany), Mounir Chaftar (Germany), Sofian Chahed (Germany), Nejmeddin Daghfous (Germany), Rani Khedira (Germany), Sami Khedira (Germany), Ayman (Germany), Elyas M'Barek (Germany), Adel Tawil (Germany), Amel Karboul (Germany), Michel Boujenah (France), Azzedine Alaïa (France), Tarak Ben Ammar (France), Lââm (France), Nolwenn Leroy (France), Yoann Touzghar (France), Isleym (France), Hatem Ben Arfa (France), Sadek (France), Tunisiano (France), Afef Jnifen (Italy), Sana Hassainia (Canada), Hinda Hicks (England), Mohamed Hechmi Hamdi (England), Hend Sabry (Egypt), Ghassan bin Jiddo (Lebanon), Cyril Hanouna (France), Kev Adams (France)

== Links with Tunisia ==
In Tunisia, free courses of instruction in Tunisian Arabic are organised during the summer holidays for the children of Tunisian residents abroad, who are heavily influenced by the culture of the countries in which they live. Trips are also organised for them to experience Tunisian culture, history and civilisation.

== See also ==
- Arab Diaspora
- Tunisian Americans
- Tunisian Canadians
- Tunisians in France
- Tunisian people in Italy
- Arabs in Denmark
- Arabs in Sweden
- Arabs in Austria

== Bibliography ==
- Janice Alberti Russell, The Italian community in Tunisia. 1861–1961. A viable minority, éd. Université Columbia, Columbia, 1977
- Salah Rimani, Les Tunisiens de France : une forte concentration parisienne, éd. L'Harmattan, Paris, 1988
- Bruce Allen Watson, Exit Rommel. The Tunisian Campaign. 1942–43, coll. Stackpole Military History Series, éd. Stackpole Books, Mechanicsburg (Pennsylvanie), 1999, (ISBN 9780811733816)
- Maastricht university, An analysis of the Engagement of the Tunisian Diaspora in Germany and the Potentials for Cooperation, 2013
