= Avec le temps =

Avec le temps (French for 'With time') may refer to:

- Avec le temps (EP), an extended play record by French singer-songwriter Isleym
  - "Avec le temps" (Isleym song), a song from the extended play
- "Avec le temps" (Léo Ferré song), by French poet and musician Léo Ferré
- Avec le temps, an album by Soso Maness, 2021
