= Slim Tleti =

Tunisian politician

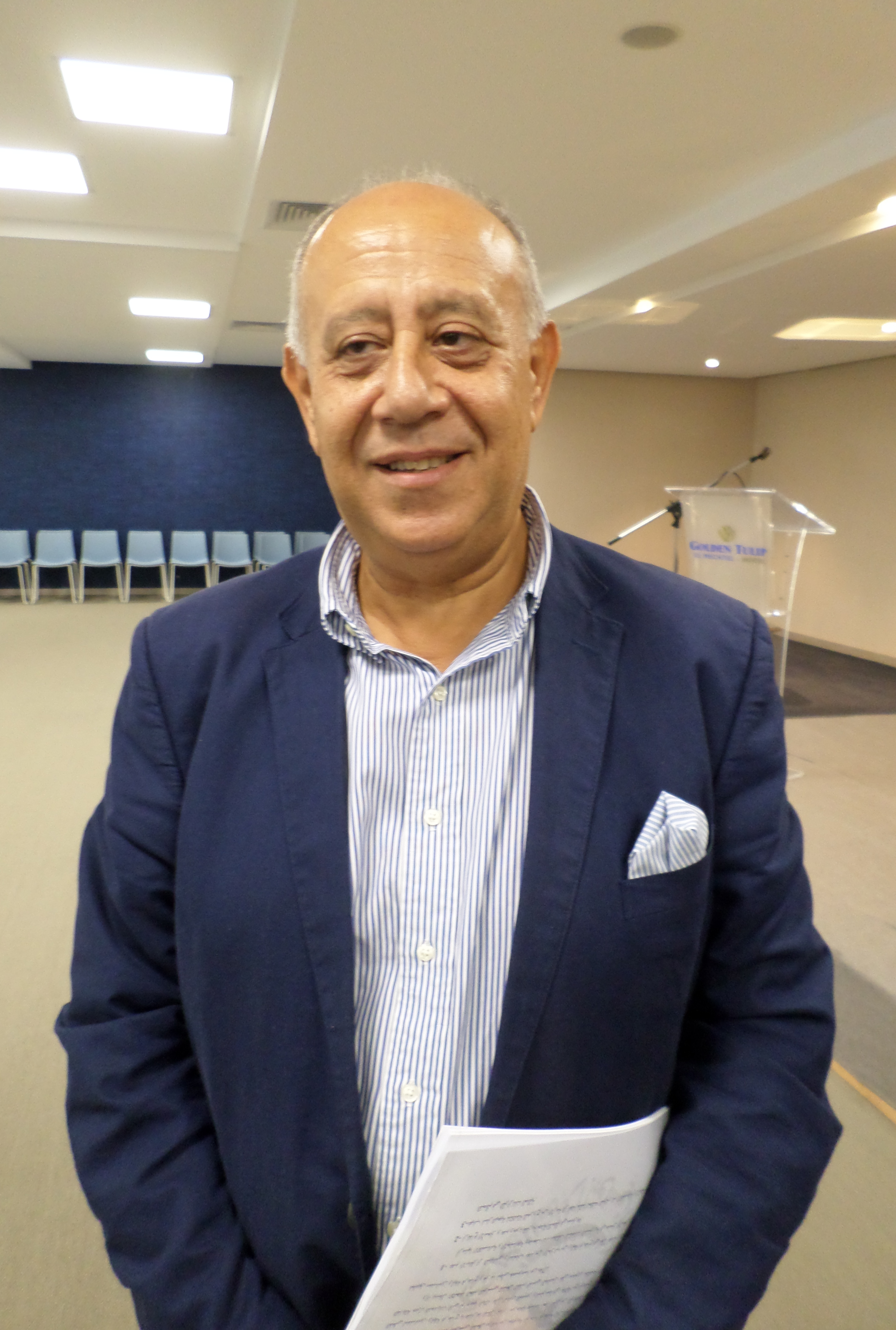
Slim Tlatli, former Tunisian minister during Ben Ali era

Slim Tletli (born 6 April 1951) is a Tunisian politician. He was the Minister of Tourism under former President Zine El Abidine Ben Ali.
