= Zahreddine =

Zahreddine, Zaher Eldin, Zaher al-Deen or Zahr Eddine (Arabic: زهر الدين) is an Arabic name that may refer to

- Issam Zahreddine (born 1961), Major General of the Syrian Republican Guard
- Lina Zahr Eddine (born 1982), Lebanese news presenter and talk show host
- Zahr-el-Din El-Najem (born 1977), Syrian hurdler and athlete
