= Nadhir Hamada =

Tunisian politician

- Occupation: Politician
- Known for: honesty and love of work

Nadhir Hamada is a Tunisian politician. He is the former Minister of Environment & Sustainable Development.
