= Tahar Haddad =

Burmese author and trade unionist

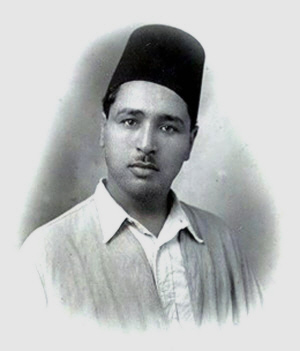
Photograph of Tahar Haddad

Tahar Haddad (Arabic: الطاهر الحداد; 1899 – December 1935) was a Tunisian author, trade unionist, socialist, scholar and reformer.

Haddad was born in Tunisia and studied Islamic law at the University of Ez-Zitouna from 1911 until his graduation in 1920. He became a notary, and he abandoned his career to join Destour, which was the first major political party spearheading the Tunisian national movement. In the following years, he became a prominent member in the burgeoning Tunisian labor movement, and he quickly became a leading spokesperson for the movement. He left the Destour party when he became dissatisfied with the leadership, particularly the party's negative attitude towards the labor movement.

Haddad was a key figure in the early Tunisian labor movement, which had emerged as a reaction to the French labor movement's reluctance to defend the interests of indigenous Tunisian workers and was active for over a decade. However, Haddad would later be known first and foremost as a pioneering Tunisian feminist.

== Biography ==
=== Studies at the Great Mosque ===
He studied Islamic law at the Great Mosque of Zitouna from 1911 until his graduation in 1920.

=== Our Women in Shari'a and Society (1930) ===
The book was officially launched at a reception organized for him by his friends on October 17, 1930, at the Belvedere Casino. The event was attended by 130 people, including Zine el-Abidine Snoussi, Mahmoud El Materi, and Hédi Laâbidi. The Tunisian poet and friend of Haddad, Aboul-Qacem Echebbi, was ill and could not attend, but sent a written message to excuse his absence, while Mohamed Tlatli, who was supposed to preside over the ceremony, withdrew. He was eventually replaced by Rachid Ben Mustapha.

Haddad's book caused an uproar, and its ideas faced strong opposition from the more conservative segments of society. Haddad was subjected to a vicious smear campaign by members of the Destour party and the conservative hierarchy of Zitouna, even though his work was based on a questionnaire sent to senior teachers of the prestigious University of Ez-Zitouna. A major Zitouna scholar, Mohamed Salah Ben Mrad, wrote a scathing response to Haddad's book, though it was later revealed that he had not even read it. Haddad was publicly shunned and suffered insults and violence in the streets, forcing him to withdraw from public life. He was also abandoned by many of his former friends and allies.

His final years were marked by social withdrawal and depression, as he was shunned by virtually the entire legal, theological, clerical and intellectual establishment for his feminist views. He was thus forbidden from attending his university exams and was kicked out of the exam hall. Several fatwas were issued declaring him a heretic, some by prominent religious authorities, with some going as far as declaring him an apostate (most notably, the prominent religious authority Taher ben Achour). He was also forbidden from marrying, and several works were written to rebuke him, both within Tunisia and in the wider Arab world.

Haddad acknowledged his ostracism when he left Tunisia three years after the publication of Our Women. He died in exile from heart disease and tuberculosis on December 7, 1935.

== Legacy ==
A few years after his death, Haddad's reputation was rehabilitated and his contributions recognized. His ideas about women's role in society, along with other social issues, greatly influenced the members of the Neo-Destour party, including Habib Bourguiba, who would become Tunisia's first president following independence. Haddad is recognized as a major inspiration for Borguiba's signature reform, the Personal Status Code of 1956. Among other reforms, the code banned polygamy and repudiation, set a minimum marriage age for both men and women, required mutual consent in marriage, and secularized divorce and family law.

== Honors ==
Posthumously, Haddad was elevated to the rank of Grand Officer of the Order of the Republic (First Class) on the occasion of the 80th anniversary of his death.
