= European Moroccans =

Moroccans of European ancestry

المغاربة الأوروبيون (Arabic)
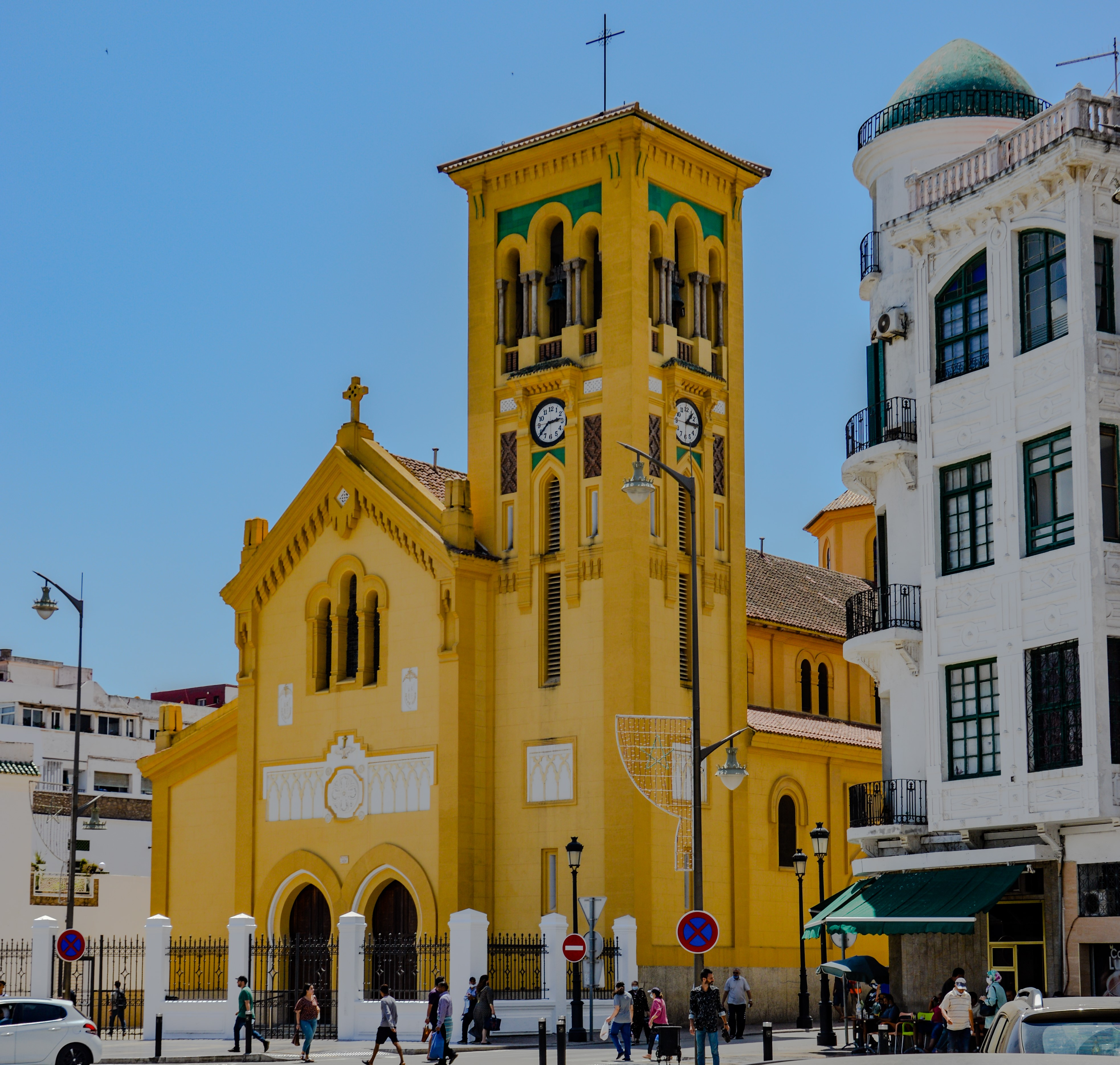
- The Spanish Church (Church of Our Lady of Victory of Tétouan) in Tétouan, Morocco

Total population
- 13,000

Regions with significant populations
- Casablanca

Languages
- French, Spanish, Arabic, Judaeo-Spanish

Religion
- Christianity (predominantly), Islam, Judaism

Related ethnic groups
- Pied-Noir, other Europeans

European Moroccans are Moroccans whose ancestry lies within the continent of Europe.

== History ==
Prior to independence, Morocco was home to half a million Europeans, and European Christians formed almost half the population of the city of Casablanca. Since the kingdom's independence in 1955, the European population has decreased substantially.

At the beginning of the 20th century, 250,000 Spaniards lived in Morocco. Most left Morocco after its independence and their numbers were reduced to 13,000. In 1950, Catholics in Spanish protectorate in Morocco and Tangier constituted 14.5% of the population, and the Spanish Morocco was home to 113,000 Catholic settlers. Catholics in Spanish protectorate in Morocco and Tangier were mostly of Spanish descent, and to a lesser extent of Portuguese, French and Italian ancestry.

During the French and Spanish protectorates, Morocco had significant populations of European Catholic settlers: on the eve of independence, an estimated 470,000 Catholics resided in Morocco. Since independence in 1956, the European Catholic population has decreased substantially, and many Catholics left to France or Spain. Prior to independence, the European Catholic settlers had historic legacy and powerful presence. Independence prompted a mass exodus of the European Catholic settlers; after series of events over 1959-1960 more than 75% of Catholic settlers left the country.

== Notable European Moroccans ==
- Paul Pascon
- René Verzier

== See also ==
- Pied-Noir
- European Tunisian
- Italian settlers in Libya
- History of the Jews in Morocco
