= European Tunisians =

التونسيون من أصول أوروبية (Arabic)
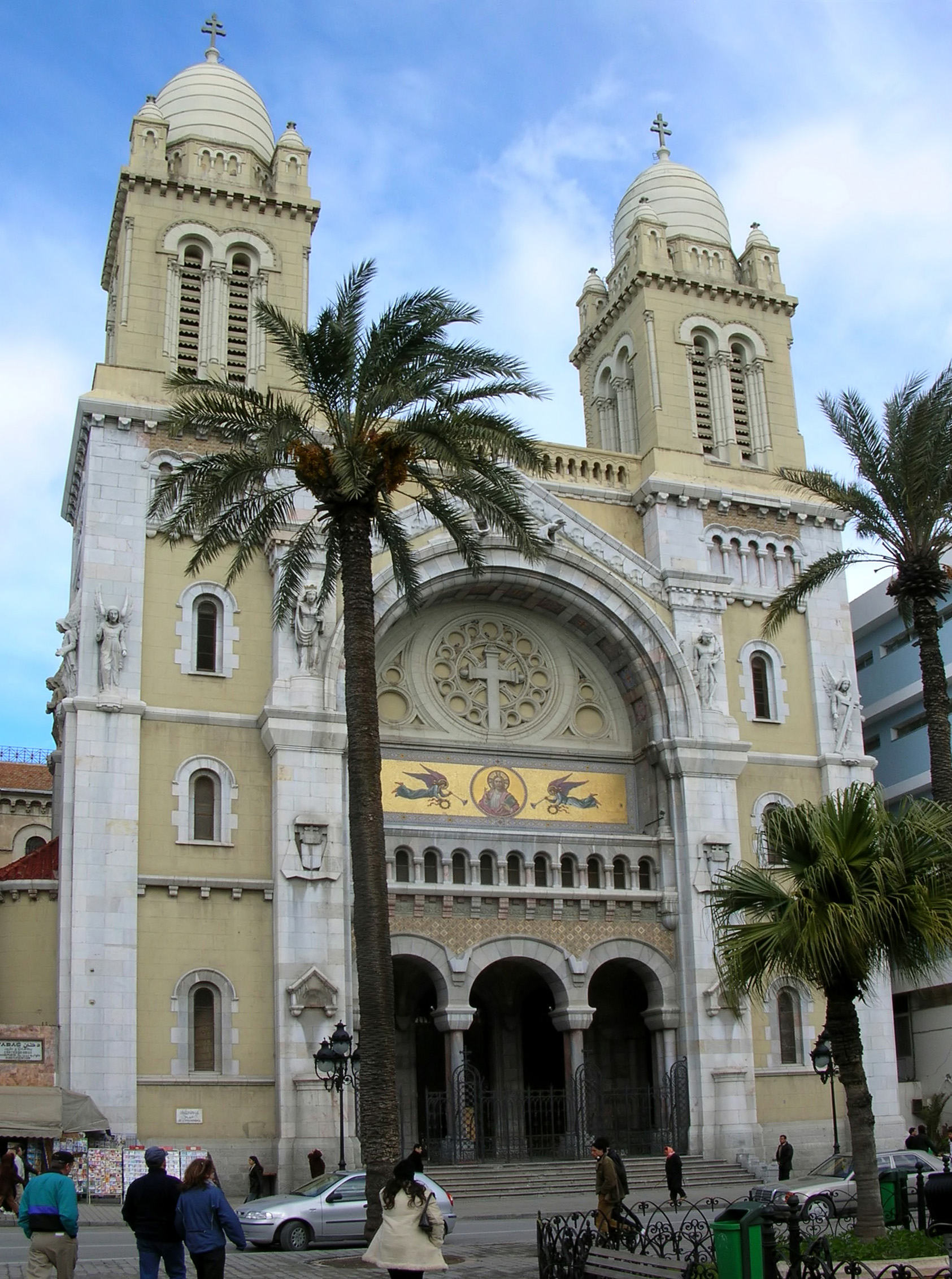
- Cathedral of Saint Vincent de Paul, Tunis

Total population
- Tunis

Languages
- Tunisian Derja, French, Italian, Maltese, English

Religion
- Christianity (predominantly), Judaism, Islam

Related ethnic groups
- Pied-Noir

European Tunisians are Tunisians whose ancestry lies within the ethnic groups of Europe, notably the French and Italian.

Prior to independence, there were 255,000 Europeans in Tunisia in 1956 (mostly Catholics). In 1926, there were 90,000 Italians in Tunisia, compared to 70,000 Frenchmen, despite the fact that Tunisia was a French protectorate, as well as 8,396 Maltese.

Our Lady of Trapani procession is a traditional festival that the Tunisian Christian community celebrates on the 15th of August of each year at Saint-Augustin and Saint-Fidèle's church in the city of La Goulette in Tunis.

== History ==
Share of Europeans during French rule in Tunisia

The formalization of French colonization in Tunisia occurred with the Treaty of Bardo in 1881, which established a French protectorate over the nation.

== Notable people ==
- Moufida Bourguiba (1890-1976), first First Lady of Tunisia (1957-1961)

== See also ==
- Italian Tunisians
- European Moroccans
- Pied-Noir
- Italian settlers in Libya
- History of the Jews in Tunisia
