= Tunisians =

People of Tunisia

تونسيون (Tūnisiyyūn) / (Twānsa) توانسة

Total population
- c. 14 million^{[a]}

Regions with significant populations
- Tunisia ~11,970,000 (2024 census)
- France: 1,383,000
- Italy: 370,000
- Germany: 195,000
- United States: 175,685
- Israel: 120,700 (Tunisian Jews, or people with Tunisian Jewish ancestry)
- Libya: 84,000
- Canada: 25,650
- Belgium and Luxembourg: 24,810
- Turkey: 5,105
- United Arab Emirates: 19,361
- Algeria: 18,796
- Saudi Arabia: 16,774
- Switzerland: 16,667
- Sweden: 9,417
- Netherlands: 8,776
- Qatar: 31,540
- United Kingdom and Ireland: 10,797
- Austria, Croatia, Slovakia, and Slovenia: 7,921
- Oman: 5,693
- Morocco: 4,570
- Spain: 4.294
- Kuwait: 3,500
- Egypt: 3,413
- Brazil: 2,077
- Bahrain: 1,605
- Norway: 1,540
- Romania: 1,352
- Poland: 1,340
- Lebanon: 1,323
- Greece: 981
- Jordan: 950
- Japan: 757
- Australia: 514
- Indonesia, Malaysia, Singapore, Thailand, Philippines, and Vietnam: 497
- South Africa: 349

Languages
- Majority: Arabic (Tunisian Arabic), French; Historically: Phoenician, Punic, Canaanite, Latin, African Romance; Minority: Judeo-Tunisian Arabic, and Berber

Religion
- Predominantly Sunni Islam (Maliki); Minority:Judaism
- ^{a} The total figure is merely an estimation; sum of all the referenced populations.

Tunisians (Arabic: تونسيون, romanized: Tūnisiyyūn) are the citizens and nationals of Tunisia in North Africa, who speak Tunisian Arabic and/or one of the Berber languages commonly found in Southern Tunisia and share a common Tunisian culture and identity. In addition to the approximately 12 million residents in Tunisia, a Tunisian diaspora has been established with modern migration, particularly in Western Europe, namely France, Italy and Germany. The vast majority of Tunisians are Arabs and Berbers who adhere to Sunni Islam.

== History ==
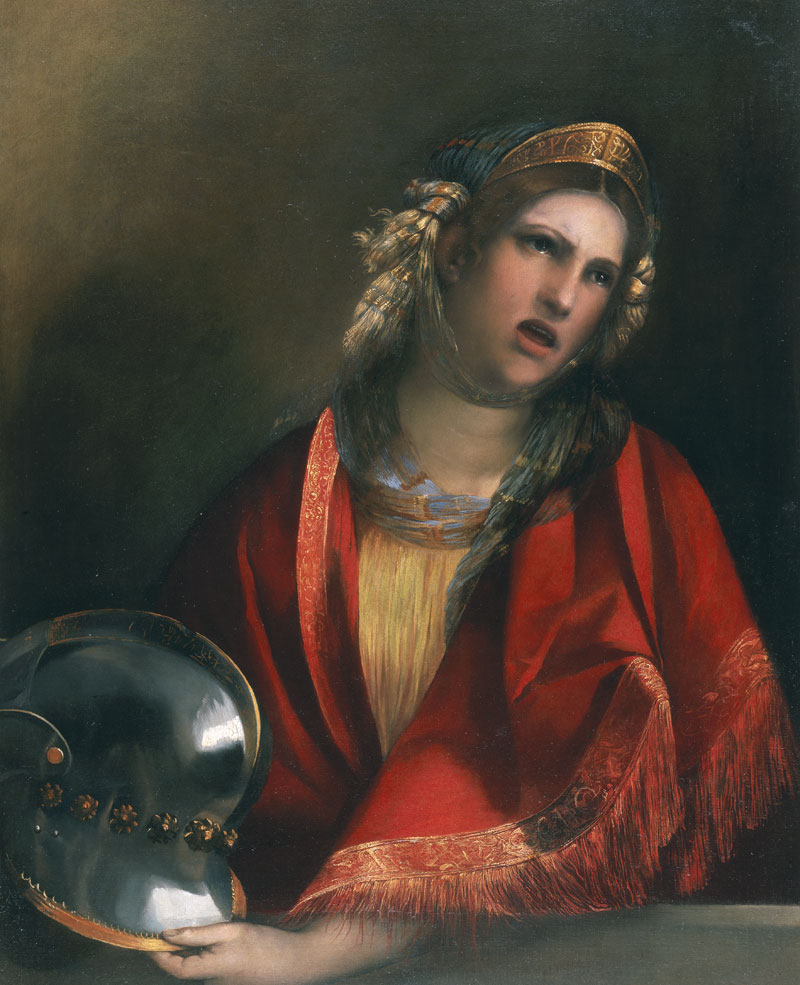
A depiction of Dido, the legendary Phoenician queen

=== Africa and Ifriqiya ===
The Phoenicians, a Semitic people, migrated and settled in the region of present-day Tunisia from the 12th to the 2nd century BC, establishing numerous settlements on the coast, including ancient Carthage which emerged as the most powerful by the 7th century BC. The migrants brought with them their culture and language that progressively spread from Tunisia's coastal areas to the rest of the coastal areas of Northwest Africa, as well as parts of the Iberian Peninsula and the Mediterranean islands. The descendants of the Phoenician settlers came to be known as the Punic people. From the 8th century BC, most Tunisians were Punic. Evidence from Sicily shows that some western Phoenicians (Punic people) used the term "Phoinix," although it is not clear what term they self-identified with, as they may have self-identified themselves as 𐤊𐤍𐤏𐤍𐤌 (knʿnm, "Canaanites"). A passage from Augustine's writings has frequently been understood as suggesting that they called themselves Canaanites (Chanani in Latin). The Punic language, a variety of the Phoenician language, seems to have survived well past written use. Arab geographer al-Bakri described a people who lived in Sirte who spoke a language which was not Berber, Latin, or Coptic, well after the Muslim conquest of the Maghreb. Punic culture survived the destruction of Carthage in 146 BC.

When Carthage fell in 146 BC to the Romans, the coastal population was mainly Punic, but that influence decreased away from the coast. From the Roman period until the Islamic conquest, Latins, Greeks and Numidians further influenced the Tunisians, which prior to the modern era, Tunisians were known as Afāriqah, from the ancient name of Tunisia, Ifriqiya or Africa in the antiquity, which gave the present-day name of the continent Africa.

From the Muslim conquest of the Maghreb in 673, many Arabs settled with Arab tribes in Tunisia which was called Ifriqiya, in places like Kairouan which soon became one of the purely Arab settlements in the Umayyad Caliphate. This accelerated in the 11th century with the large migrations of the Arab tribes of Banu Hilal and Banu Sulaym to Ifriqiya and the rest of the Maghreb. Some Persians and other Middle-Eastern populations also settled in Ifriqiya, which had its name from the ancient name, the Roman province of Africa. In the early-11th century, Normans from the Kingdom of Sicily took over Ifriqiya and founded the Kingdom of Africa, which lasted from 1135 to 1160. Muslim refugees from Sicily and Malta were encouraged by the Normans to settle in Tunisia during this period.

After the Reconquista and expulsion of non-Christians and Moriscos from Spain, many Spanish Muslims and Jews also arrived. According to Matthew Carr, "As many as eighty thousand Moriscos settled in Tunisia, most of them in and around the capital, Tunis, which still contains a quarter known as Zuqaq al-Andalus, or Andalusia Alley."

=== Tunisians ===
By around the 15th century, the region of modern-day Tunisia had already been almost completely Arabized, establishing Arabs as the demographic majority of the population.

During the 17th to the 19th centuries, Ifriqiya came under Spanish, then Ottoman rule and hosted Morisco then Italian immigrants from 1609. Tunis was officially integrated into the Ottoman Empire as the Eyalet of Tunis (province), eventually including all of the Maghreb except Morocco and Mauritania.

Under the Ottoman Empire, the boundaries of the territory inhabited by Tunisians contracted; Ifriqiya lost territory to the west (Constantine) and to the east (Tripoli). In the 19th century, the rulers of Tunisia became aware of the ongoing efforts at political and social reform in the Ottoman capital. The Bey of Tunis then, by his own lights but informed by the Turkish example, attempted to effect a modernizing reform of institutions and the economy. Tunisian international debt grew unmanageable. This was the reason or pretext for French forces to establish a Protectorate in 1881.

A remnant of the centuries of Turkish rule is the presence of a population of Turkish origin, historically the male descendants were referred to as the Kouloughlis.

=== Republic and Revolution ===
Independence from France was achieved on 20 March 1956. The State was established as a constitutional monarchy with the Bey of Tunis, Muhammad VIII al-Amin Bey, as the king of Tunisia. In 1957, the Prime Minister Habib Bourguiba abolished the monarchy and firmly established his Neo Destour (New Constitution) party. In the 1970s the economy of Tunisia expanded at a very healthy rate. Oil was discovered and tourism continued. City and countryside populations drew roughly equal in number. Yet agricultural problems and urban unemployment led to increased migration to Europe.

The 84-year-old President Bourguiba was overthrown and replaced by Ben Ali his Prime Minister on 7 November 1987. However, the Ben Ali regime came to an end 23 years later on 14 January 2011, in the events of the Tunisian Revolution, following nationwide demonstrations precipitated by high unemployment, food inflation, corruption, a lack of political freedoms like freedom of speech and poor living conditions. The Revolution would also be the catalyst that would start the Arab Spring.

Following the overthrow of Ben Ali, Tunisians elected a Constituent Assembly to draft a new constitution and an interim government known as the Troika because it was a coalition of three parties; the Islamist Ennahda Movement in the lead, with the centre-left Congress for the Republic and the left-leaning Ettakatol as minority partners. Widespread discontent remained however, leading to the 2013–14 Tunisian political crisis. As a result of the efforts made by the Tunisian National Dialogue Quartet, the Constituent Assembly completed its work, the interim government resigned, and new elections were held in 2014, completing the transition to a democratic state. The Tunisian National Dialogue Quartet was awarded the 2015 Nobel Peace Prize for "its decisive contribution to the building of a pluralistic democracy in Tunisia in the wake of the Tunisian Revolution of 2011".

Beyond the political changes, which lead to Tunisia becoming a recognised democracy in 2014, those events also brought important changes to the post-2011 Tunisian culture.

== Population ==
=== Ethnic groups ===
The vast majority of the country's population consists chiefly of Arabs, who comprise 98% of the total population. Other ethnic groups include Europeans, which account for 1% of the population, as well as Berbers, who also make up 1%. While Ottoman influence was particularly important in the formation of a Turkish-Tunisian community among the country's elites, other peoples also migrated to Tunisia over different periods of time, including but not limited to, sub-Saharans, Greeks, Romans, Phoenicians (Punics), Jews and French settlers. Nevertheless, from 1870, the distinction between the Tunisian masses and the Turkish elite became blurred. There is also a minority Berber population (1%) mainly located in the Dahar mountains.

From the late 19th century to after World War II, Tunisia was home to large populations of French and Italians (255,000 Europeans in 1956), although nearly all of them, along with the Jewish population, left after Tunisia became independent. The history of the Jews in Tunisia goes back some 2,600 years, with the El Ghriba Synagogue in Djerba believed one of, if not the oldest synagogue in the world. In 1948 the Jewish population was an estimated 105,000, but by 2013 only about 900 remained.

=== Religion ===
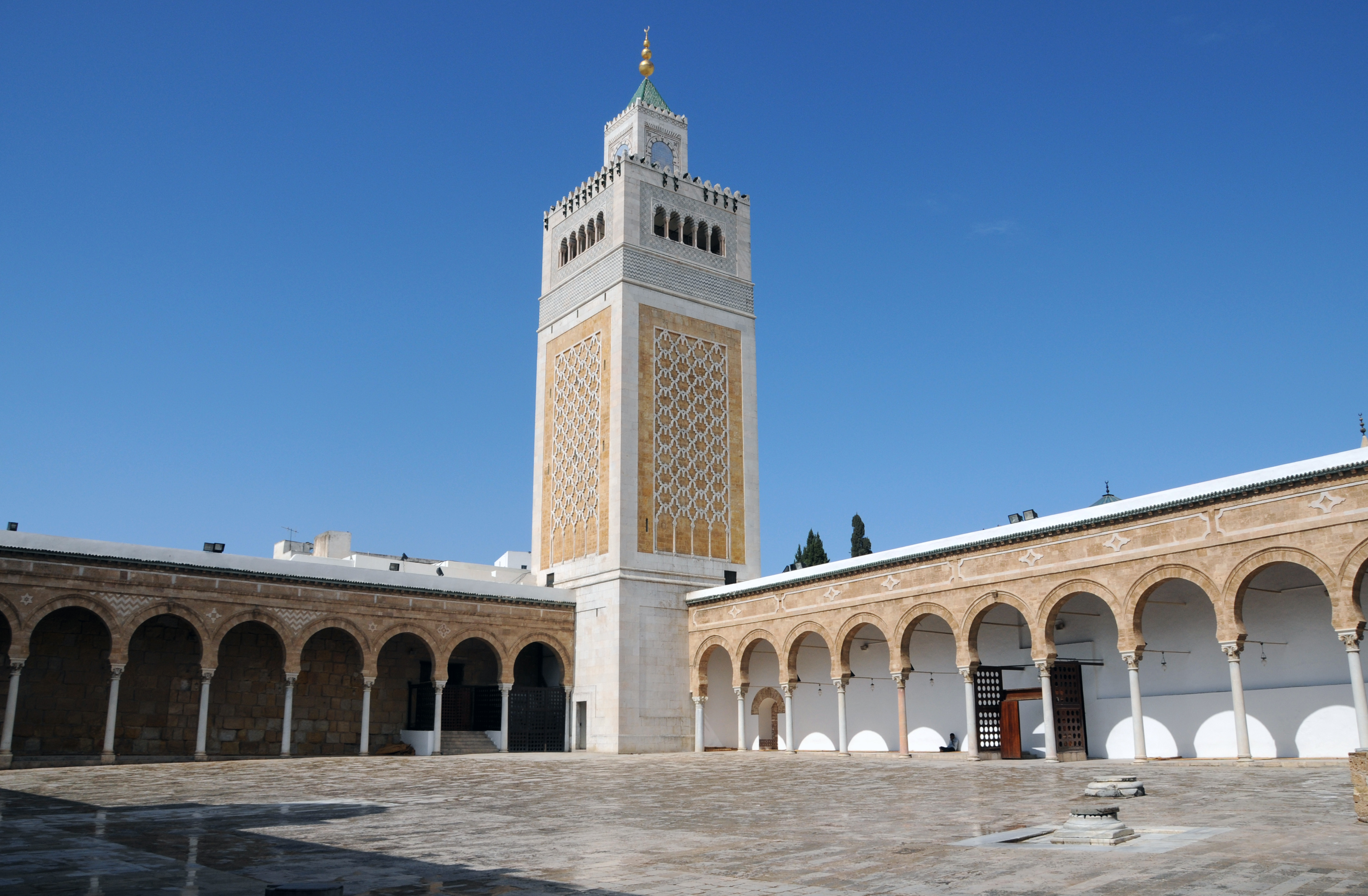
Al-Zaytuna Mosque

99% of Tunisians identify as Muslims. The remaining 1% primarily follow Christianity or Judaism. According to a 2018 Arab Barometer survey, an overwhelming 99.4% of Tunisians still identified as Muslim at the time. However, the same survey revealed a notable shift in religious self-identification: over one-third of Tunisians described themselves as non-religious. This marked a sharp rise from around 12% in 2013 to approximately 33% in 2018, positioning Tunisia as the least religious country in the Arab world at the time. The Arab Barometer found that about 46% of the Tunisian youth said they were not religious. However, as of July 2022, new surveys by the Arab Barometer say otherwise, that the previously noted wave of those saying they were not religious has been, in fact, "reversed".

The majority of Tunisians follow the Maliki school of Sunni Islam, and their mosques are marked by square minarets. During Ottoman rule, the Turks introduced the Hanafi school, which is still practiced by families of Turkish descent. Their mosques are characterized by octagonal minarets. Sunnis make up the majority of Muslims, with non-denominational Muslims as the second-largest group, followed by the Ibadite Amazighs.

The Church of Carthage, in particular, became significant in the history of Christianity, playing a key role in the development of Christian philosophy and theology, and producing many prominent religious scholars and theologians. Before Tunisia's independence, the country was home to over 250,000 Christians, mostly of Italian and Maltese descent. Many Italian settlers left for Italy or France following independence from France. Today, Tunisia's Christian population is around 35,000, primarily Catholics (22,000), with a smaller number of Protestants. Historically, Berber Christians lived in some Nefzaoua villages until the early 15th century, and a community of Tunisian Christians existed in Tozeur until the 18th century. According to the 2007 International Religious Freedom Report, there were documented cases of a small number of Tunisian Muslims converting to Christianity.

Judaism is the third largest religion in Tunisia, with an estimated population of between 1,000 and 1,400 members. About one-third of Tunisia's Jewish population resides in and around the capital, while the rest live on the island of Djerba, known for its 39 synagogues, with the community dating back over 2,600 years. Djerba is home to the El Ghriba synagogue, one of the oldest and continuously used synagogues in the world. It is considered a pilgrimage site, with annual celebrations due to its historical significance and the belief that it was constructed with stones from Solomon's Temple.

== Culture ==
=== Cultural symbols ===
==== Flag ====
The national flag of Tunisia is predominantly red and consists of a white circle in the middle containing a red crescent around a five-pointed star. The Hafsid dynasty used a similar flag during the Middle Ages, it consisted of a white crescent pointing upwards and a white five-pointed star but instead of featuring the red color it featured the yellow color. The crescent and star might also recall the Ottoman flag as an indication of Tunisia's history as a part of the Ottoman Empire. Whitney Smith states that the crescent was first emblazoned on standards and buildings in the Punic state of Carthage, located in present-day Tunisia. Since appearing on the Ottoman flag, they were widely adopted by Muslim countries. The sun is often represented with the crescent on ancient Punic artifacts and is associated with the ancient Punic religion, especially with the Sign of Tanit.

==== Coat of arms ====
As for the national coat of arms, they are officially adopted in 1861 and include revised versions on 21 June 1956, and 30 May 1963. The top has a Carthaginian galley sailing on the sea while the lower part is divided vertically and on the right depicts a black lion seizing a silver scimitar. A banner bears the national motto: "Liberty, Order, Justice".

==== Jasmine ====
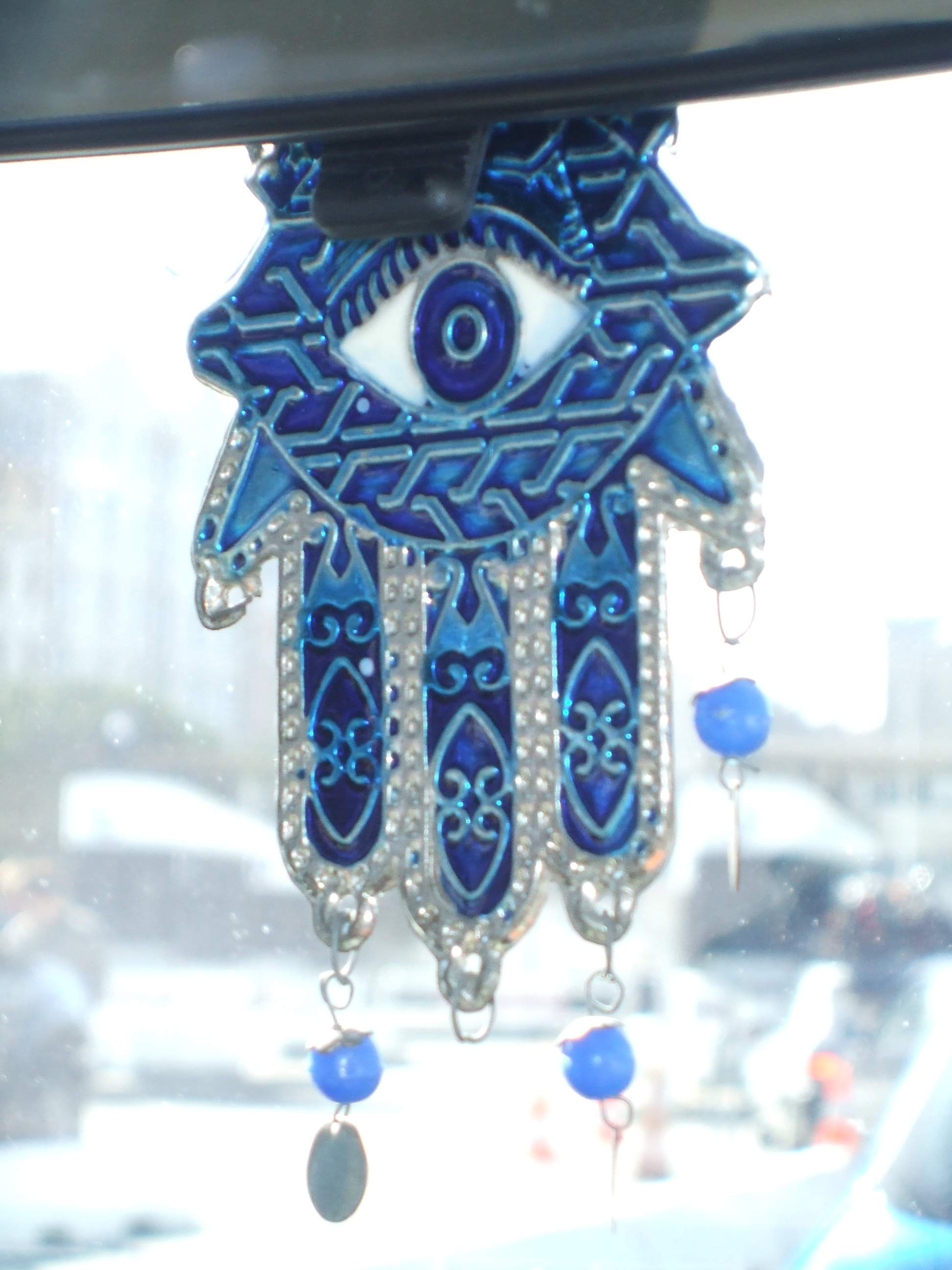
Tunisian hamsa

Imported by the Andalusians in the sixteenth century, jasmine has become the national flower of Tunisia. The gathering takes place at dawn and then, upon nightfall, when young boys collect small bouquets, and later sell them to passersby on the street or to motorists stopped at intersections.

Furthermore, jasmine is the subject of a specific sign language. A man who wears jasmine on his left ear indicates that he is single and in addition, offering white jasmine is seen as a proof of love while on the contrary, offering odorless winter jasmine is a sign of insolence.

==== Hamsa ====
The hamsa (Tunisian Arabic: خمسة, also romanized khamsa) is a palm-shaped amulet popular in Tunisia and more generally in the Maghreb, and commonly used in jewelry and wall hangings. Depicting the open right hand, an image recognized and used as a sign of protection in many times throughout history, the hamsa is believed to provide defense against the evil eye. It has been theorized that its origins lie in Carthage (modern-day Tunisia) and may have been associated with the Goddess Tanit.

==== Chechia ====
The Chechia is the national headgear of Tunisia. Supple and cylindrical in shape, the chechia was imported into Tunisia in its current form from Spain, by the Moors expelled after the capture of Granada in 1492. Finding in Tunisia a second homeland, they establish the craft of the chechia there. After the independence of Tunisia in 1956 and with the arrival of manufactured goods and customs from the Europe, the wearing of the chechia tends to be limited to holidays and religious festivals; it is often associated with the elderly.

=== Language ===
Tunisian Arabic is a set of dialects of Maghrebi Arabic spoken in Tunisia. In addition to mastering French. In the Tunisian diaspora makes it common for Tunisians to code-switch, mixing Arabic with French, English or other languages in daily speech.

Moreover, Tunisian Arabic is closely related to the Maltese language, that descended from Maghrebi Arabic and Siculo-Arabic.

=== Gastronomy ===
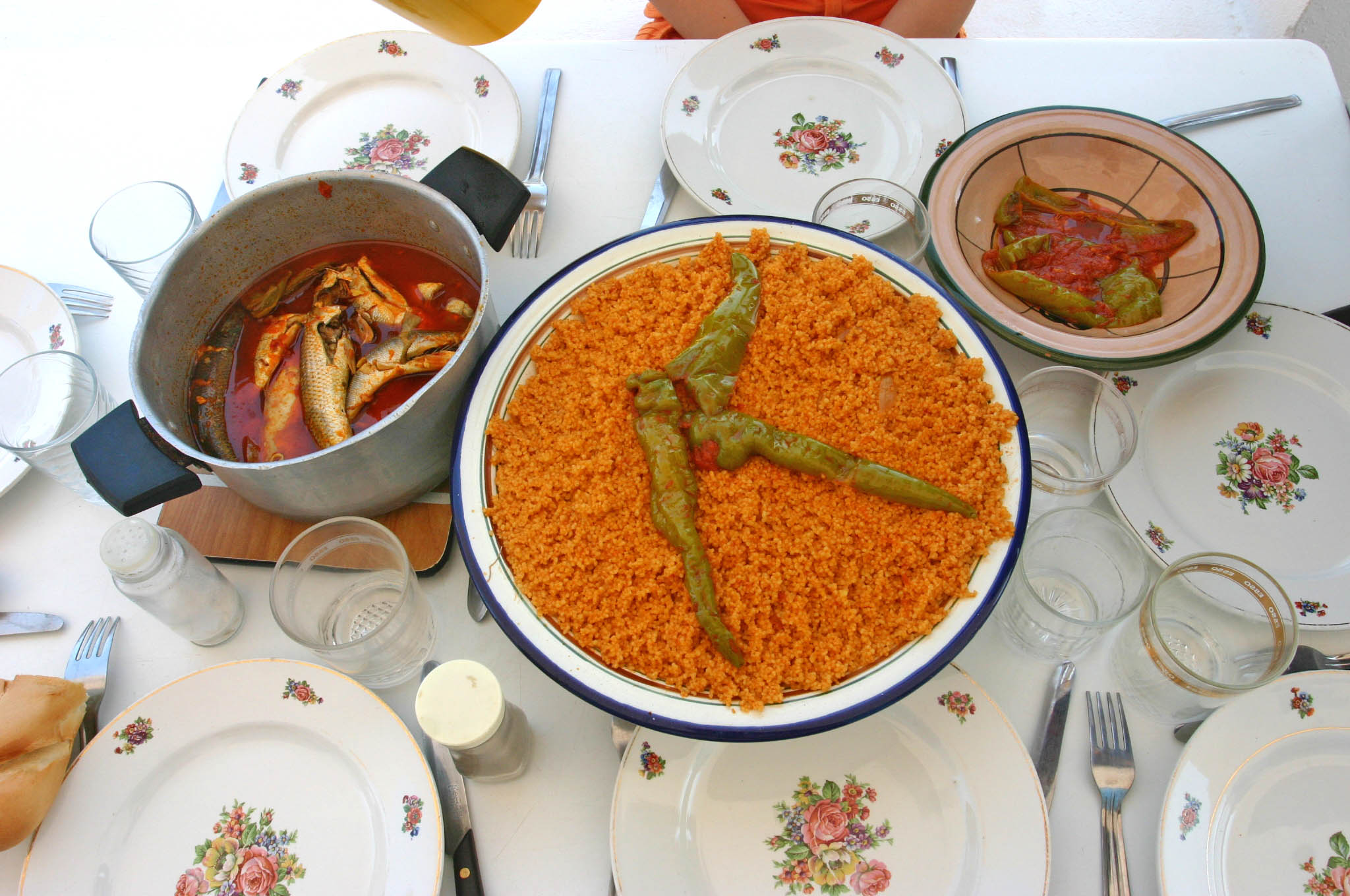
Couscous with Kerkennah fish

Tunisian cuisine is a blend of Mediterranean cuisine and traditions. Its distinctive spicy fieriness comes from neighbouring Mediterranean countries and the many civilizations who have ruled Tunisian land: Romans, Vandals, Byzantines, Arabs, Spanish, Turkish, Italians (Sicilians), French, and the native Punics-Berber people. Tunisian food uses a variety of ingredients and in different ways. The main dish that is served in Tunisia is Couscous, made of minuscule grains that are cooked and usually served with meat and vegetables. In cooking they also use a variety of flavors such as: olive oil, aniseed, coriander, cumin, caraway, cinnamon, saffron, mint, orange, blossom, and rose water.

Like all Mediterranean cultures, Tunisian culture offers a "sun cuisine", based mainly on olive oil, spices, tomatoes, seafood (a wide range of fish) and meat from rearing (lamb).

=== Architecture ===
Tunisian architecture is traditionally expressed in various facets in Tunisia through Roman architecture and Islamic architecture. Through many buildings, Kairouan forms the epicenter of an architectural movement expressing the relationship between buildings and spirituality with the ornamental decoration of religious buildings in the holy city. In Djerba, the architecture such as the fortress of Kef reflects the military and spiritual destiny of a Sufi influence in the region.

The influential role of the various dynasties that ruled the country, particularly in building cities and princes of Raqqada Mahdia, illuminates the role of the geopolitical context in the architectural history of the country. Thus, many original fortresses that protected the coast from Byzantine invasions evolved into cities, like Monastir, Sousse or Lamta.

The medina of Tunis, is World Heritage Site of UNESCO, and is a typical example of Islamic architecture. However, in the areas between the ports of Bizerte and Ghar El Melh, settlements founded by the Moors fleeing Andalusia were reconquered by Catholic sovereigns and has more of a Christian influence. Given the cosmopolitan nature of cities in Tunisia, they have retained a diversity and juxtaposition of styles. Many buildings were designed by many different architects, artisans and entrepreneurs during the French protectorate. Among the most famous architects of that time were Victor Valensi, Guy Raphael, Henri Saladin, Joss Ellenon and Jean-Emile Resplandy. Five distinct architectural and decorative styles are particularly popular: those of the eclectic style (neo-classical, baroque, etc..) Between 1881 and 1900 and then again until 1920 the style was neo-Mauresque, between 1925 and 1940 it was in the Art Deco style and then the modernist style between 1943 and 1947.

=== Music ===
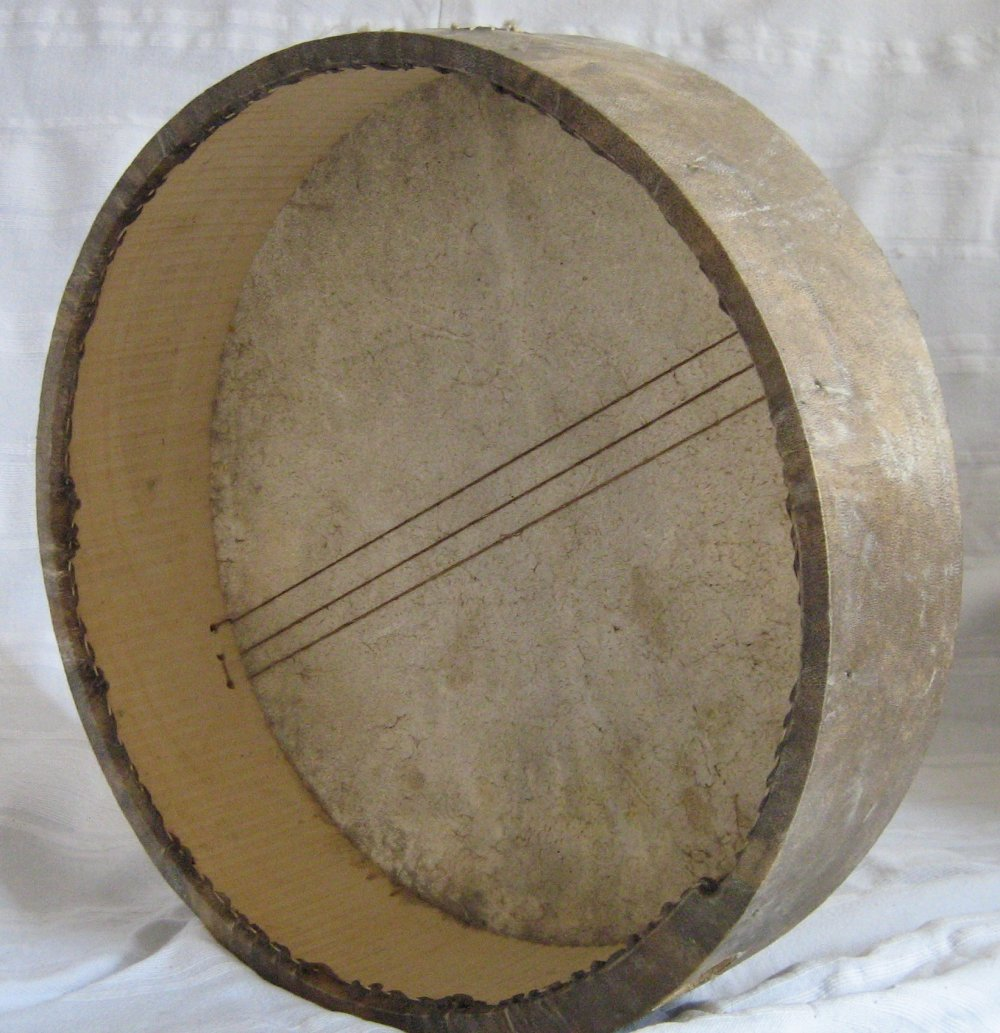
Tunisian Bendir (frame drum) with snare

According to Mohammed Abdel Wahab, Tunisian music has been influenced by old Andalusian songs injected with Turkish, Persian and Greek influences. Of major note in Tunisian classical music is the Malouf. Deriving from the reign of the Aghlabids in the 15th century, it is a particular type of Andalusian music. In urban areas it uses stringed instruments (fiddle, oud and Kanun) and percussion (darbuka) while in rural areas, it may also be accompanied by instruments like the mezoued, gasba and the zurna.

The emergence of new patterns of racial and improvised music since the late 1990s changed the musical landscape of Tunisia. At the same time, the majority of the population is attracted by the music of Levantine origin (Egyptian, Lebanese or Syrian). Popular western music has also had major success with the emergence of many groups and festivals, including rock music, hip hop, reggae and jazz.

Among the major Tunisian contemporary artists include Hedi Habbouba, Saber Rebaï, Dhafer Youssef, Belgacem Bouguenna, Sonia M'barek and Latifa. Other notable musicians include Salah El Mahdi, Anouar Brahem, Zied Gharsa and Lotfi Bouchnak.

=== Cinema ===
Tunisian cinema is today recognized as one of the most liberal, most inventive (and one of the most prize-winning) cinemas of Africa and the Middle-east. Since the 90s, Tunisia became an attractive place for filming and numerous companies emerged, serving the foreign film industry and became successful. Tunisia also hosts the Carthage Film Festival which has been taking place since 1966. The festival gives priority to films from African and Middle-eastern countries. It is the oldest film festival on the African continent.

=== Theatre ===
In over a century of existence, Tunisian theatre hosted or gave birth to big names, such as Sarah Bernhardt, Pauline Carton, Gérard Philipe and Jean Marais to mention a few. On 7 November 1962, Habib Bourguiba, whose brother is a playwright, devoted his speech to this art, which he considers "a powerful means of disseminating culture and a most effective means of popular education". From this date, 7 November is regarded as the Tunisian National Day of drama.

=== Dance ===
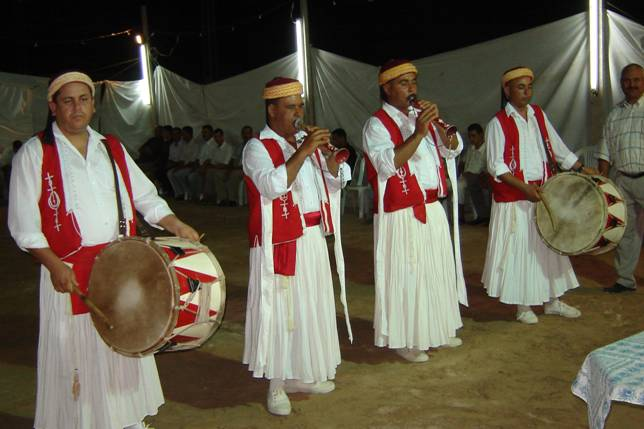
Folklore troupe of Kerkennah

The variety of dances performed by the Tunisians probably reflects the migration flows that have traversed the country throughout the centuries. Thus, the early Phoenicians brought with them their songs and dances, whose traces are rooted in the region of Tunis, while the Romans have left few traces of art in relation to their architectural contribution. Religious dances were influenced by Sufism but by the end of the 15th century, had progressively become Andalusian with their dances and urban music.

Oriental dance would arrive later with the Ottomans, although some experts in the history of Northwest African art have said it was brought to Tunisia by the first Turkish corsairs in the sixteenth century while others say that the origin of this dance goes back further to the era of matriarchy in Mesopotamia and founded by the early Phoenicians. This form of oriental dance usually performed in Tunisia insists on the movements of the pelvis in rhythm, movement highlighted by the elevation of the arms to horizontal, and feet moving in rhythm and transferring weight onto the right leg or left.

The Nuba, more rooted in popular practice, is linked to the dancers and the Kerkennah Djerba to a lesser extent. Some experts say that their dress is of Greek origin. Structured into several scenes, the dance is often accompanied by acrobatic games with jars filled with water.

=== Literature ===
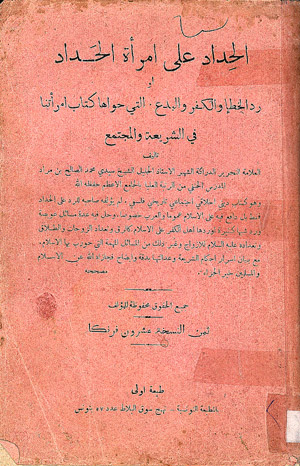
First page of a Tunisian book (1931) by Mohamed Salah Ben Mrad (1881–1979)

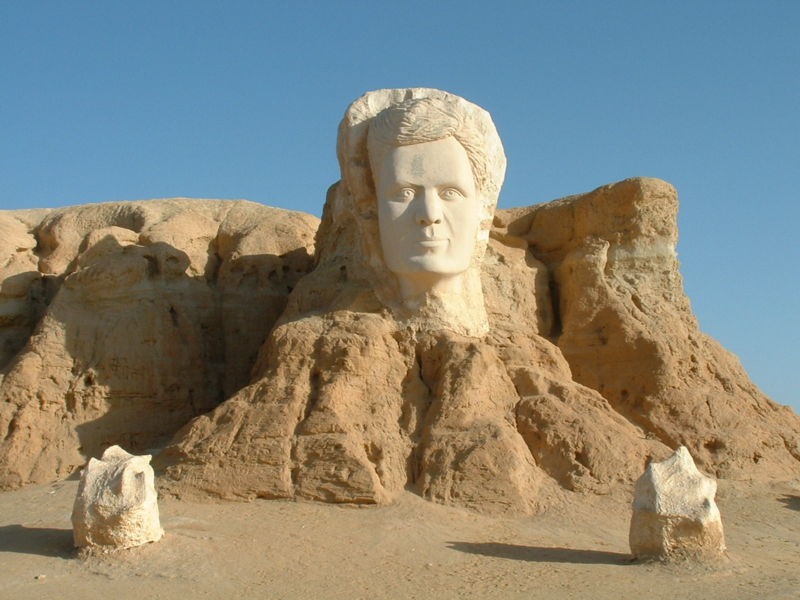
Bust of Aboul-Qacem Echebbi in Ras El Aïn (Tozeur)

Among the Tunisian literary figures include Ali Douagi, who has produced more than 150 radio stories, over 500 poems and folk songs and nearly 15 plays, Khraief Bashir and others such as Moncef Ghachem, Mohamed Salah Ben Mrad or Mahmoud Messadi. As for poetry, Tunisian poetry typically opts for nonconformity and innovation with poets such as Aboul-Qacem Echebbi. As for literature, it is characterized by its critical approach. Contrary to the pessimism of Albert Memmi, who predicted that Tunisian literature was sentenced to die young, a high number of Tunisian writers are abroad including Abdelwahab Meddeb, Bakri Tahar, Mustapha Tlili, Hélé Béji or Mellah Fawzi. The themes of wandering, exile and heartbreak are the focus of their creative writing.

The national bibliography lists 1249 non-school books published in 2002 in Tunisia. In 2006 this figure had increased to 1,500 and 1,700 in 2007. Nearly a third of the books are published for children.

== Tunisian Diaspora ==
Statistics of the Office of Tunisians Abroad show more than 128,000 Tunisian families in Europe with a concentration in France and Germany. Young Tunisians (less than 16 years of age) represent 25% of the Tunisian community abroad. Thus there is currently a rejuvenation of the Tunisian diaspora which is now in its third generation. Women represent nearly 26% of the total community. In France, their percentage is estimated at 38.2%. The portion of the diaspora who are over 60 years old is around 7%.

Originally, the largest part of the Tunisians in Europe worked in sectors requiring minimal qualifications. In effect the migrants of the 1960s and 70s were less educated (mostly farmers or manual labourers).

Subsequently, the majority of Tunisians settled in France have worked in the service sector (hotels, restaurants or retail) or have headed small businesses. In 2008, Tunisia became the first of the Maghreb countries to sign a management agreement concerning the flow of migrants, at the impetus of President Nicolas Sarkozy: it provides easy access for almost 9,000 Tunisian students enrolled in French institutions, but also almost 500 titres de séjour (residency permits) for highly qualified individuals so that they can acquire experience in France, valid for a maximum of six years.

=== People of Tunisian Heritage ===
==== Prominent Historical Figures ====
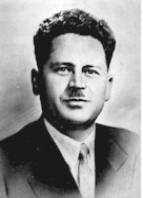
Farhat Hached (1914–1952) was a Tunisian labor leader and nationalist activist who played a significant role in the struggle for Tunisia's independence from French colonial rule.

Aboul-Qacem Echebbi, Abu Zakariya Yahya, Ahmad I ibn Mustafa, Aisha Al-Manoubya, Ali Douagi, Ali ibn Ziyad, Asad ibn al-Furat, Aziza Othmana, Azzedine Alaïa, Bchira Ben Mrad, Beji Caid Essebsi, Carlos Marcello, Chokri Belaid, Farhat Hached, Habib Bourguiba, Hassan ibn al-Nu'man, Hayreddin Pasha, Ibn Abi Zayd, Ibn al-Jazzar, Ibn Khaldun, Ibn Rachik, Ibrahim II of Ifriqiya, Lamine Bey, Max Azria, Mohamed Bouazizi, Mohamed Brahmi, Moncef Bey, Moufida Bourguiba, Tewhida Ben Sheikh, Muhammad al-Tahir ibn Ashur, Radhia Haddad, Sahnun, Tunisian National Dialogue Quartet (Entity winner of the 2015 nobel peace prize) and Victor Perez

==== Modern International Figures ====
Salah Mejri (United States), Bertrand Delanoë (France), Claude Bartolone (France), Dove Attia (France), M. Salah Baouendi (United States), Poorna Jagannathan (United States), Mustapha Tlili (United States), Ferrid Kheder (United States), Oussama Mellouli (United States), Leila Ben Youssef (United States), Mounir Laroussi (United States), Bushido (rapper) (Germany), Loco Dice (Germany), Sami Allagui (Germany), Änis Ben-Hatira (Germany), Mounir Chaftar (Germany), Sofian Chahed (Germany), Nejmeddin Daghfous (Germany), Marwan Kenzari (Netherlands), Rani Khedira (Germany), Sami Khedira (Germany), Ayman (Germany), Elyas M'Barek (Germany), Adel Tawil (Germany), Amel Karboul (Germany), Michel Boujenah (France), Tarak Ben Ammar (France), Lââm (France), Yoann Touzghar (France), Isleym (France), Hatem Ben Arfa (France), Sadek (France), Tunisiano (France), Afef Jnifen (Italy), Sana Hassainia (Canada), Hinda Hicks (England), Mohamed Hechmi Hamdi (England), Hend Sabry (Egypt), Ghassan bin Jiddo (Lebanon), Cyril Hanouna (France), Kev Adams (France), Sabrine Bentunsi (France), Moungi Bawendi (United States), Saïd Bouziri (France).

=== Links with Tunisia ===
In Tunisia, free courses of instruction in Tunisian Arabic are organised during the summer holidays for the children of Tunisian residents abroad, who are heavily influenced by the culture of the countries in which they live. Trips are also organised for them to experience Tunisian culture, history and civilisation.

=== Genetics ===
Tunisians mainly carry E1b1 haplogroup (55%) and J1 haplogroup (34.2%).

Listed here are the human Y-chromosome DNA haplogroups in Tunisia.

Haplogroup	n	B	E1a	E1b1a	E1b1b1	E1b1b1a3	E1b1b1a4	E1b1b1b	E1b1b1c	F	G	I	J1	J2	K	P,R	R1a1	R1b1a	R1b1b	T
Marker			M33	M2	M35	V22	V65	M81	M34	M89	M201			M172				V88	M269	M70
Tunisia	601	0.17	0.5	0.67	1.66	3	3.16	62.73	1.16	2.66	0.17	0.17	16.64	2.83	0.33	0.33	0.5	1.83	0.33	1.16

Elkamel, Sarra et al. (2021) wrote that: "Considering Tunisian populations as a whole, the majority part of their paternal haplogroups are of autochthonous Berber origin (71.67%), which co-exists with others assumedly from the Middle East (18.35%) and to a lesser extent from Sub-Saharan Africa (5.2%), Europe (3.45%) and Asia (1.33%)."

Y-chromosome and mitochondrial DNA analysis in Tunisia, showed rural Berbers were endogamous and isolated, creating a population microstructure with Tunisian communities. Urban populations showed much higher genetic diversity and less structural differentiation. Identified genetic differences were more about individual community isolation rather than within ethnicities (Arabs, Berbers, Andalusians).

A study in 2015 used 376 unrelated Tunisian individuals. From the results, Tunisians were genetically related to Western Mediterranean populations, being other North Africans, Berbers and Iberians, and less relations with Eastern Levantine Arabs.

2020 research revealed that Southern Tunisian Bedouin Arabs had a higher prevalence of Arabian admixture than the Berbers, who despite Islamization, preserved their genome.

== See also ==
- Moroccans
