= Issam Abdallah =

Reuters video journalist (1986–2023)

- عصام عبد الله
- Born: Issam Bassam Hassan Khalil Abdallah; 1986; Al-Khiyam, Nabatieh Governorate, Lebanon
- Died: 13 October 2023 (aged 37); Aalma ash-Shaab, South Governorate, Lebanon
- Occupation: Journalist

Issam Abdallah (Arabic: عصام عبد الله; 1986 – 13 October 2023) was a Lebanese video journalist working for Reuters who was killed by Israel Defense Forces (IDF) tank-fire in southern Lebanon on 13 October 2023, while reporting in the context of the Gaza war.

== Life ==
Abdallah began providing Reuters with footage in 2007, working as a freelancer while completing his university studies. Abdallah carried a video camera and a camera for still photographs wherever he went. He first provided footage of intra-Lebanese conflicts.

Abdallah reported from the Syrian civil war, Russo-Ukrainian War, and other conflicts. Abdallah was nominated as Reuters Video Journalist of the Year in 2020 for coverage of the Beirut port blast. He had provided the world press with one of the first and strongest images of the disaster. Abdallah was part of a larger team that won an award in 2022 for their coverage of the Russo-Ukrainian War.

== Death ==
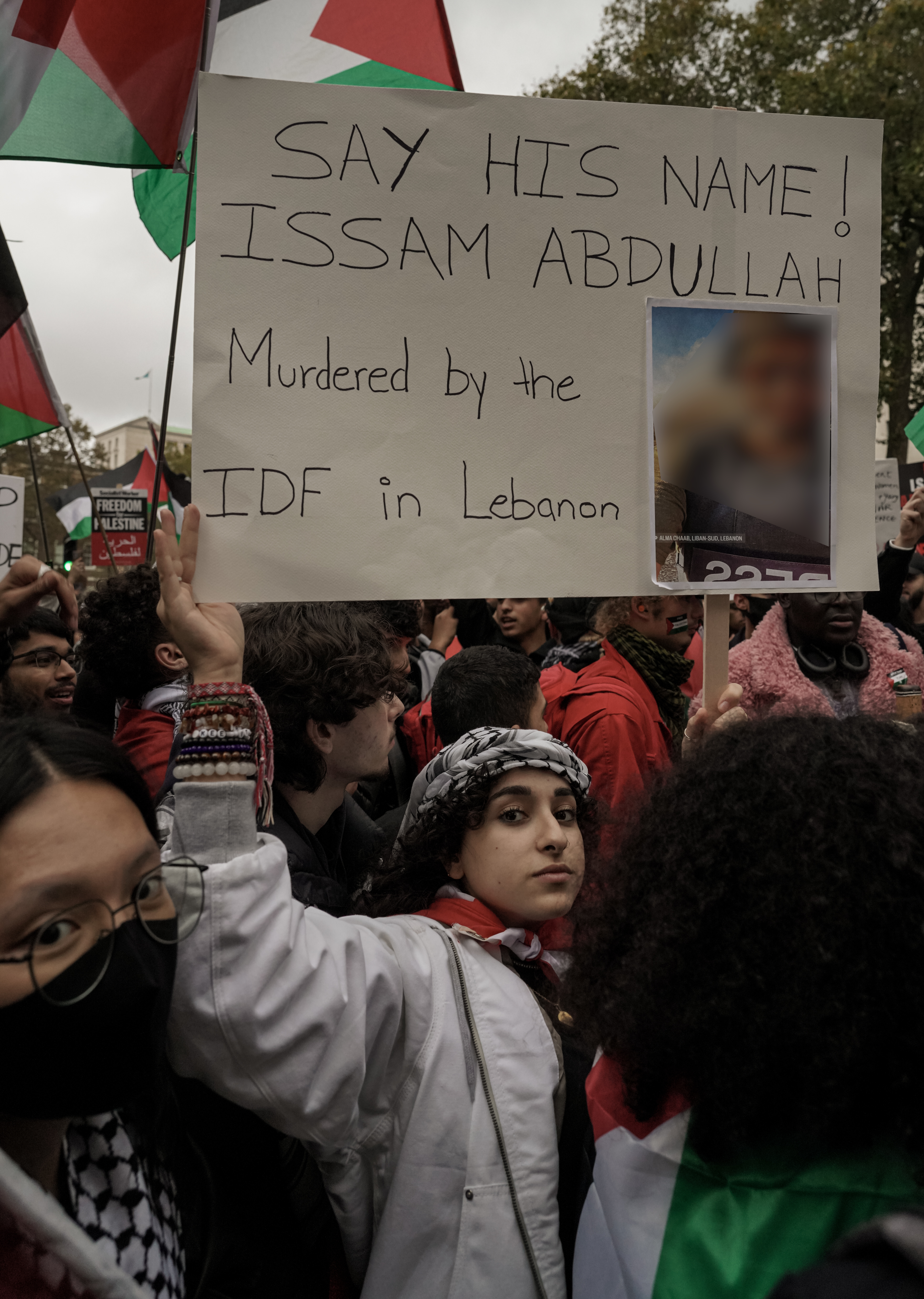
A protestor holds up a sign for Issam Abdallah during mass demonstrations in London, 29 October 2023

On October 13, 2023, Issam Abdallah traveled as part of a group of three Reuters and two AFP journalists to a hilltop in Lebanon near Aalma ash-Shaab to film cross-border shelling by Israeli tanks. At the hilltop were already two journalists livestreaming the scene for Al Jazeera. All were wearing blue helmets and flak jackets, most of which were labeled "Press". Abdallah's group arrived at 5:16 pm local time.

For the next 45 minutes, they filmed without issue while being continuously surveilled by Israel drones. The journalists turned their camera towards an Israel outpost at Hanita. Forty-five seconds later, an Israeli Merkava IV tank located at another military installation 1.3 km from the hilltop fired a 120 mm high explosive, fin stabilized shell across the border directly at Issam Abdallah, killing him instantly and punching a hole in the low stone wall he had been leaning against. Thirty-seven seconds after the first shot, a tank fired a second shell from the same location, destroying the car of the Al Jazeera journalists and knocking their cameras to the ground. The other six journalists on the scene were also wounded. Most seriously injured of the others was Christina Assi, a photographer for Agence France-Presse (AFP), whose wounds forced the amputation of part of her right leg.

The attack was captured by multiple audio and video recordings. Multiple investigations were conducted by groups including AFP, Reuters, Human Rights Watch, and Amnesty International, all of which concurred that an Israeli tank had intentionally fired on the reporters, citing evidence at the scene including fragments of the tail of an Israeli shell. An Israeli spokesman declined to answer detailed questions about the strike, saying "We don't target journalists."

Six other journalists from news agencies, including Reuters photographer Christina Assi, and video journalist Dylan Collins from Agence France-Presse (AFP), as well as a journalist from the broadcaster Al Jazeera, were injured, some seriously. Lebanon's army has said the IDF fired the missile that killed Abdallah. Another Reuters reporter at the scene said Abdallah was killed by projectiles fired from the direction of Israel.

Abdallah was buried on 14 October 2023 in his hometown of Al-Khiyam in southern Lebanon next to his father, who had died a year prior. Journalists placed their cameras on the grave to honour his memory. His last post on Instagram, posted a week before he was killed, was a photograph of Shireen Abu Akleh, a Palestinian journalist for Al Jazeera who had been killed by Israel in 2022.

== Reactions ==
Speaking about Abdallah's death, Israeli military spokesperson Richard Hecht said, "we're very sorry", but did not confirm that Israeli shells had hit the journalists. Michael Downey, a journalist who works for The New York Times and the British Broadcasting Corporation (BBC), commented on a video taken shortly before the incident: "No warning shot; that was intentional".

"The tank shell hit them directly", said Al Jazeera correspondent Ali Hashem from Alma al-Shaab, adding that the team of reporters had been clearly marked as press.

Lebanon lodged a formal complaint with the UN Security Council over Abdallah's killing on its territory. According to state media. It is assumed in Lebanon that this was an intentional killing. Israel's representative to the United Nations stressed that Israel never wants to harm journalists, but in a war, "anything can happen."

Additionally, Agence France-Presse (AFP) called on Israeli and Lebanese authorities to "conduct a comprehensive investigation to determine the circumstances behind and responsibility for firing along their border that killed and wounded journalists on assignment..."

An open letter by Committee to Protect Journalists, Freedom House, Freedom of the Press Foundation, Human Rights Watch and Reporters Without Borders said the killing of Abdallah by Israel was "apparently deliberate".

== Investigations ==
=== RSF investigation ===
Reporters Without Borders (RSF) made a preliminary finding on 29 October that the deaths were the result of a "targeted" strike from the direction of the Israeli border, concluding that the "two strikes in the same place in such a short space of time (just over 30 seconds), from the same direction, clearly indicate precise targeting."

The investigation, which considered "eyewitness accounts, video footage and ballistics expertise", also concluded that it was "unlikely that the journalists were mistaken for combatants" given their situation out in the open, on top of a hill, wearing helmets and jackets marked with 'press'. The RSF called on Israel to launch a probe over the events.

=== United Nations investigation ===
A February 2024 report by the United Nations Interim Force in Lebanon concluded that an Israeli tank killed Abdallah when it fired at "clearly identifiable journalists", and that this broke international law. The report "assessed that there was no exchange of fire across the Blue Line at the time of the incident", with no records of any exchange of fire across the border for the 40 minutes before the tank firing.

== See also ==
- List of journalists killed in the Gaza war
