= Farah Omar (journalist) =

Lebanese journalist (1998–2023)

- فرح عمر
- Born: 16 June 1998; Machghara, Beqaa Governorate, Lebanon
- Died: 21 November 2023 (aged 25); Near Tayr Harfa, South Governorate, Lebanon
- Cause of death: Israeli airstrike
- Resting place: Islamic Resistance Martyrs' Cemetery, Machghara
- Education: Lebanese University
- Occupation: Journalist
- Years active: 2021–2023
- Employer: Al Mayadeen

Farah Omar (Arabic: فرح عمر; 16 June 1998 – 21 November 2023) was a Lebanese journalist based in Beirut. She worked for various media outlets, including Radio Lebanon and Al Mayadeen. She was killed in an Israeli airstrike while reporting on the Gaza war in Tyre District.

== Early life and education ==
Omar was born on 16 June 1998 in Machghara, a town in Beqaa Governorate, Lebanon. She went on to obtain a master's degree in journalism and media from Lebanese University before beginning her career as a journalist in Beirut.

== Career ==
Omar began her journalism career working for the satellite news channel Al Mayadeen. She focused on national and regional politics, including the 2022 Lebanese general election and the 2023 Turkish presidential and parliamentary elections. Omar produced the news programme Fekra (lit. 'Idea'), which aired on Al Mayadeen.

== Death ==
Omar was killed on 21 November 2023 alongside videographer Rabih al-Maamari during an Israeli tank strike on Tyre District, South Governorate, while she was reporting on the Israel–Hezbollah conflict in southern Lebanon from near Tayr Harfa. Her funeral was subsequently held at the Islamic Resistance Martyrs' Cemetery in Machghara on 22 November.

Ghassan bin Jiddo, the chairman of Al Mayadeen's board of directors, released a statement in which he accused the Israeli military of "directly targeting" Omar as part of an ongoing assault against "Arab media" due to its pro-Palestinian stance. Audrey Azoulay, the director-general of UNESCO, condemned Omar and al-Maamari's killings.
