= Où ça nous mène =

Studio album by Isleym
- Released: 21 April 2014
- Recorded: 2010–2014
- Genre: R&B
- Length: 54:28
- Language: French
- Label: Play On, 7th Magnitude
- Producer: Dany Synthé, MatrX, Skread

Isleym chronology
Avec le temps (2011)	Où ça nous mène (2014)

Singles from Où ça nous mène
- 1. "Avec le temps" Released: April 1, 2011; 2. "Petit bateau" Released: October 21, 2013; 3. "Oublie-moi" Released: April 23, 2014

Où ça nous mène is the debut studio album by French singer-songwriter Isleym. It was released on iTunes on 21 April 2014 by Play On and 7th Magnitude. The album entered the French Albums Chart at number 45 in its first week, and peaked at the same position.

== Background ==
At the age of 14, Isleym was discovered by French rapper Nessbeal and record producer Skread, and later signed to Skread's record label 7th Magnitude. She began writing and composing songs with Dany Synthé, and after the release of her debut single "Avec le temps", she decided that she had to begin working on an album.

[...] In fact, he [Nessbeal] lives in the same neighbourhood as I do. One day, he came into the studio where I was singing, he listened and he got hooked. From there, he took me under his wing. He introduced me to his team and proposed that we work together. I trusted him and I haven't been wrong! I continued working with Dany Synthé, we racked up some tracks and I presented them to my producer. We recorded them as we went on, until the song "Avec le temps", where we said that we had to do an album. It was after this song that I signed with the label 7th Magnitude.

— Isleym, in an interview with Que j'adore Paris.

== Singles ==
Où ça nous mène has produced 3 singles so far:

- "Avec le temps" was released as the lead single of Isleym's debut extended play of the same name on 1 April 2011. It peaked at number 79 on the French Singles Chart, and number 47 on the Belgian Ultratip 50 chart in Wallonia.
- "Petit bateau" was released as the second single of the album on 21 October 2013, but has never charted.
- "Oublie-moi" was released as the album's third single on 23 April 2014, but has never charted.

== Track listing ==
No.	Title	Producer(s)	Length
1.	"Intro"	Skread	3:06
2.	"Avec le temps"	Dany Synthé	2:52
3.	"Où ça te mène"	Dany Synthé	4:11
4.	"Ange gardien"	Skread	3:22
5.	"Oublie-moi"	Dany Synthé	4:16
6.	"Grande sœur" (featuring Awa Imani)	Skread	3:35
7.	"Qu'une histoire"	Dany Synthé	3:56
8.	"Encore et encore"	Dany Synthé	3:16
9.	"Accélère" (featuring Orelsan)	Dany Synthé	3:24
10.	"Petit bateau"	Skread	3:37
11.	"Celles et ceux"	Skread, Dany Synthé	3:36
12.	"Toucher le ciel"	Dany Synthé, MatrX	3:44
13.	"À quoi tu penses"	Dany Synthé	3:27
14.	"Besoin d'ailes" (featuring Nessbeal)	Dany Synthé	3:32
15.	"Partir"	Skread	4:34
Total length:			54:28

Producer credits:

== Chart performance ==
Chart (2014)	Peak position
French Albums (SNEP)	45
