= Al Mayadeen =

Lebanese satellite news television channel

Al Mayadeen الميادين
- Type: News broadcasting channel
- Country: Lebanon
- Broadcast area: Worldwide
- Network: Al Mayadeen Satellite Media Network
- Headquarters: Beirut (main), Tunis, Cairo, Tehran

Programming
- Languages: Arabic, English, Spanish

Ownership
- Key people: Ghassan bin Jiddo (director), George Galloway (presenter)

History
- Launched: 11 June 2012; 14 years ago

Links
- Website: english.almayadeen.net

Availability

Streaming media
- Al Mayadeen Live: LiveStation link

Al Mayadeen (Arabic: المَيادِين, romanized: al-Mayādīn, lit. 'The Plazas') is a Lebanese pan-Arabist satellite news television channel based in the city of Beirut. Launched on 11 June 2012, it has news reporters in most of the Arab countries. Unlike its competitors, the Qatar-owned Al Jazeera and Saudi-owned Al Arabiya, as well as Sky News Arabia, and BBC News Arabic, the network is known for promoting left-wing points of view and religious plurality. At the time it was founded, most of the channel's senior staff were former correspondents and editors of Al Jazeera.

Al Mayadeen has been categorized by many media outlets as pro-Hezbollah, pro-Assad and Iran-aligned.

== History, ownership, and network ==
The network was established in Beirut in 2012 by former staff of Al Jazeera Arabic who were dissatisfied with Al Jazeera’s coverage of the Syrian civil war.

The channel is part of the Al Mayadeen satellite media network, which includes a production company, a radio station, a website in Arabic, English, and Spanish, an advertising company, and other media-related projects. Along with the original headquarters in Beirut, Al Mayadeen maintains news networks, and three major regional offices in Tunisia, Cairo, and Tehran.

When it was launched, the channel said its owners were anonymous Arab businessmen. There was speculation about the channel's funding, with commentators suggesting the channel was funded by Iran and Hezbollah; this was denied. Omar Ibhais, a freelance Lebanese TV producer, said that the channel is a joint venture between the Iranians and Rami Makhlouf, cousin of Syrian President Bashar al-Assad.

In 2019, a report by the London School of Economics Middle East Centre said the channel was "mooted to be backed by Iranian money". In December 2023, a report by the Denis Diderot Committee argued that the broadcast of the channel by two Eutelsat satellites are uplinked from two Italian teleports without the mandatory authorization of the Italian communication authority, AGCOM. The President of the Authority announced that a police investigation was launched.

On 25 October 2024, three journalists were killed in an Israeli bombing in Lebanon during the Israel–Hezbollah conflict. Among them were two staffers from Al Mayadeen. Tunisian journalist and director of the channel Ghassan bin Jiddo, said the attack was intentional.

== Staff ==
Ghassan bin Jiddo heads Al Mayadeen as the chair of the board of directors and program director of the channel. He is the former head of Al Jazeera's Iran and Beirut offices and a former talk show host in the channel. He resigned from the Qatar-based Al Jazeera in 2011, criticizing its reporting of the Syrian civil war. Jiddo seemingly accused Al Jazeera of deviating from "professional broadcasting standards", emphasizing that Al Mayadeen would remain objective and unbiased. Nayef Krayem, the owner of the Lebanon-based Al Ittihad TV and former director of the Hezbollah-affiliated Al-Manar, was designated as the general manager of the channel, but he resigned one month before its launch.

The staff of the channel include Lebanese journalists such as Sami Kulaib, Ali Hashem, the former Al Jazeera war correspondent, who said he resigned from the channel because it refused to broadcast footage of militants on the Lebanese Syrian borders in the early days of the Syrian uprising, Zahi Wehbe, Lina Zahreddine, Lana Mudawwar, Muhammad Alloush, Ahmad Abu Ali and Dina Zarkat. Two Syrian journalists, Ramia Ibrahim and Futoun Abbasi, and two Palestinian journalists Kamal Khalaf and Ahmad Sobh as well as Yemeni Mona Safwan are also among its staff. Like Jiddo, most of the channel's staff are former Al Jazeera correspondents and editors.

George Galloway, a former British MP, was a presenter for the channel. He was paid £18,000 for the first four months of 2014, for hosting two programmes a month in Beirut. He continued to present for the station in 2016 and 2017.

The channel has a network of reporters in the State of Palestine (specifically, in Gaza and Ramallah) and also, in Jerusalem. Their task is reported to provide the channel with a daily news section in the news broadcast entitled "A Window into Palestine". In addition, there are reporters of the channel in Amman, Tripoli, Rabat, Khartoum, Mauritania and Comoros. The correspondent of the channel in Damascus was withdrawn in April 2014.

Omar Abdel Qader, a Syrian cameraman working for Al Mayadeen, was killed by a sniper during clashes in Deir Ezzor, Syria, on 8 March 2014.

Al Mayadeen correspondent Farah Omar and camera operator Rabih Me’mari were killed in Israeli strikes in Southern Lebanon in November 2023. The channel accused Israel of deliberately targeting its journalists because of the channel's pro-Palestinian and pro-Iranian stance. Hezbollah said it had retaliated against Israel's killing of the journalists by firing across the border at an Israeli base.

== Programming ==
Al Mayadeen is on air for 24 hours daily. As of September 2013, the channel had ten daily news reports and nearly 17 distinct programs. One of its programs is A Free Word, a show hosted by George Galloway. The channel had formerly aired a program, namely Hadeeth Dimashq (Arabic: Damascus dialogue), focusing on the Syrian civil war, until April 2014, when it was discontinued.

In 2022, it broadcast a three-hour interview with Hezbollah leader Hassan Nasrallah to mark the 40th anniversary of the group.

== Political alignment ==
The name of the channel, Al Mayadeen, means "the squares" in English, indicating its objective "to provide coverage for the Arab popular actions on the squares of change in the context of the Arab spring revolutions". The channel states that it provides journalism, which is "committed to nationalist, pan-Arab and humanitarian issues within the template of professional journalistic objectivity". In addition, it presents itself as a "free and independent media project" with 500 staff and reporters in Arab and Western capitals. Its slogan is "Reality as it is" and its editorial policy emphasizes that Palestine and resistance movements wherever they are found are its point of reference. Following its first year of broadcast the channel began to be described as the "anti-Al Jazeera".

When the channel was launched in 2012, Asharq Al-Awsat and France 24 reported that it was the latest expansion of Iran, Syria, and Hezbollah in the field of media. In 2013, Joe Khalil, author of a book about television in the Arab world, told The Daily Telegraph newspaper that the station is undoubtedly supportive of Assad. The channel's alignment with Iran, Assad and Hezbollah was also expressed in a 2019 London School of Economics report and a 2021 academic publication by Israeli scholar Barak Bouks. A 2019 Danish study referred to it as Hezbollah-aligned. In 2022, The Jewish Chronicle said the channel's director, Ghassan bin Jiddo, has spoken of his "friendship" with Hezbollah leader Hassan Nasrallah.

According to The Daily Telegraph, Al Mayadeen's head of news is married to a former adviser to Assad. It refers to the rebels in Syria as "terrorists", and to the actions of the Syrian government against the rebels as "cleansing" when reporting the Syrian civil war.

On 6 November 2015, the Saudi-controlled Arabsat satellite TV organization suspended and banned Al Mayadeen from broadcasting on its satellite system.

The network has been accused of antisemitism in pieces by The Jewish Chronicle and Jewish Journal. According to Media Matters for America in 2021, Al Mayadeen used antisemitic conspiracy theories about George Soros in its coverage of the Pandora Papers "to sow doubt about whistleblowers and leaks".

The network stated that the Palestinian cause is the channel's centerpiece.

In September 2022, during the 2022 Russian invasion of Ukraine, Al Mayadeen spoke to Russian sources about setbacks in eastern Ukraine. It has referred to the Government of Ukraine as a "Nazi regime" and promoted the discredited Ukraine bioweapons conspiracy theory. British politician Jeremy Corbyn was criticised by Joan Ryan and the Simon Wiesenthal Center for appearing on the network during the war because of its perceived closeness to Iran and Hezbollah.

Writing in Al Mayadeen in October 2022, Janna Al Kadri said that the death of Mahsa Amini in Iran was used by the West as an "opportunity to fuel Iran-phobia and Islamophobia". She described the hijab as "a symbol of the working class in its struggle for autonomy against the ongoing and impending assaults of imperialism".
