= Christina Assi =

Lebanese photojournalist

- Born: 1995 (age 30–31); Lebanon
- Education: Notre Dame University–Louaize, Lebanon
- Occupation: Photojournalist
- Known for: Advocating for the protection of journalists
- Awards: BBC 100 Women 2024

Christina Assi (Arabic: كريستينا عاصي; born 1995) is a Lebanese photojournalist and photo editor. After losing a leg in an Israeli tank attack in southern Lebanon in October 2023, she began campaigning for journalists' safety.

== Biography ==
Christina Assi was born in Lebanon. Growing up there in the 1990s, she lived through the instability of the civil war that she documented in multiple stories. In 2005, she moved to Doha, capital city of Qatar, with her family. Assi graduated from the Notre Dame University-Louaize in Lebanon with a bachelor's degree in communications and journalism. In 2018, she began to work for Agence France-Presse (AFP) in Cyprus as a photo editor.

On 13 October 2023, while live reporting on a column of smoke on the Israeli-Lebanese border along with six other journalists, she was a victim of an Israeli tank shell attack in Alma al-Shaab. The attack involved two strikes and resulted in Assi losing her right leg. One of the two explosions killed her best friend, Reuters correspondent Issam Abdallah. Five more of their colleagues were wounded. All journalists were wearing bulletproof vests and helmets, clearly marked as press. Assi has demanded that the attack be considered a war crime.

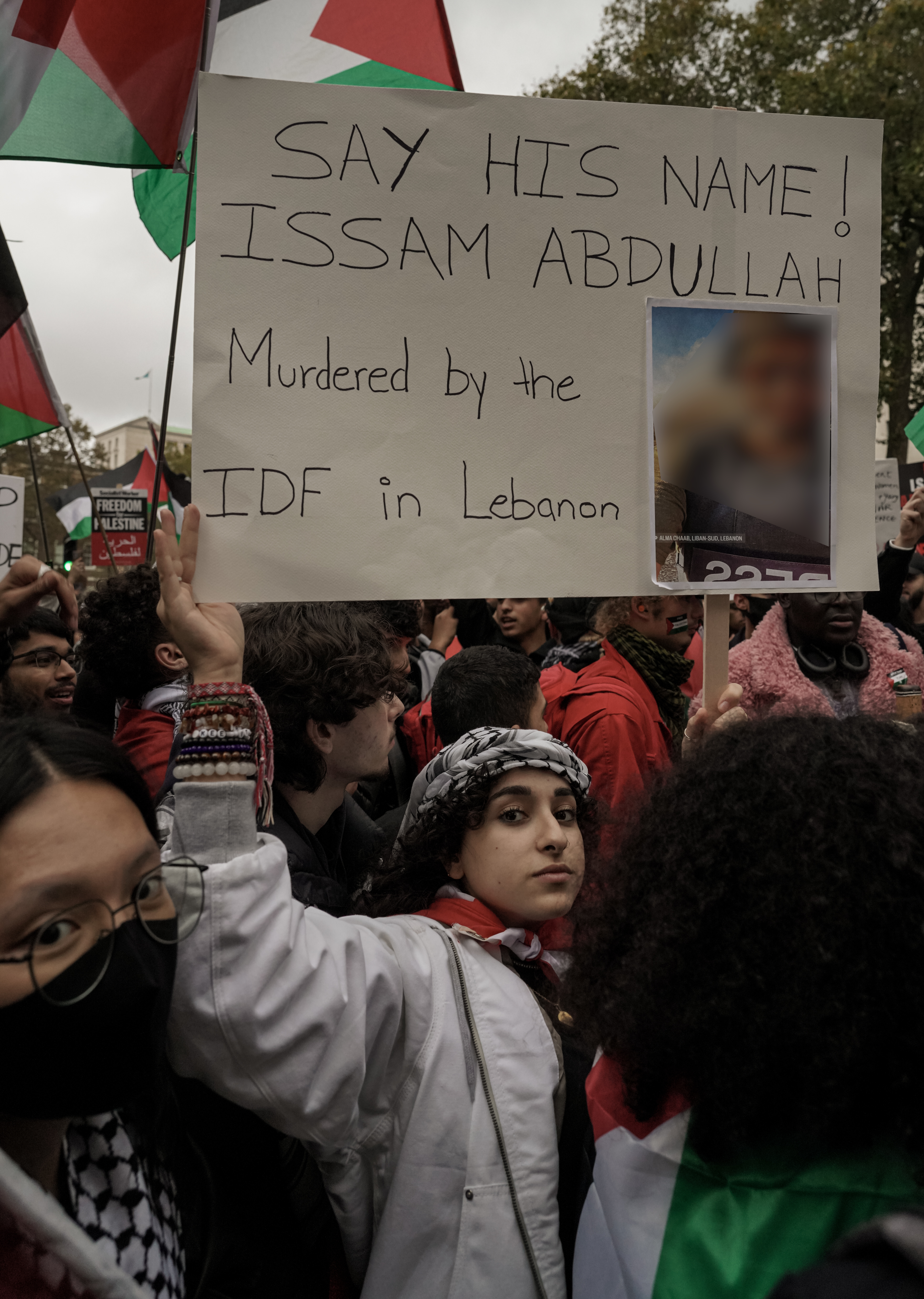
A protestor holds up a sign for Issam Abdallah during mass demonstrations in London, 29 October 2023

Since then, Assi became a campaigner for journalists' safety, giving numerous interviews and propelling a rehabilitation programme for people with similar life-altering injuries. On 21 July 2024, she carried the torch in Vincennes, France, ahead of the 2024 Paris Olympic games, representing the journalists who died in the line of duty. She carried the torch with a colleague, journalist Dylan Collins.

== Awards ==
In the end of 2024, the BBC included Assi in its list 100 Women, which recognises the most influential women in the world each year.
