= Avec le temps (Isleym song) =

Single by Isleym

from the album Avec le temps and Où ça nous mène
- Released: 1 April 2011
- Recorded: 2010
- Genre: Acoustic
- Length: 2:50
- Label: 7th Magnitude
- Songwriter(s): Isleym, Dany Synthé

Isleym singles chronology
"Avec le temps" (2011)	"Risques et périls" (2012)

Music video
- "Avec le temps" on YouTube

Audio sample
- file; help

"Avec le temps" is a song by French singer-songwriter Isleym. It was released as a digital download on April 1, 2011 as the lead single from her extended play of the same name, and was later included in her debut studio album Où ça nous mène.

== Music video ==
The music video for the song was released on 15 November 2010 as part of the EP's release on Isleym's YouTube channel.

== Track listing ==
Digital download
No.	Title	Length
1.	"Avec le temps" (radio edit)	2:50

== Chart performance ==
Chart (2011)	Peak position
France (SNEP)	79
Wallonia (Ultratip)	47
