= Mohamed Salah Ben Mrad =

Tunisian theologian (1881–1979)

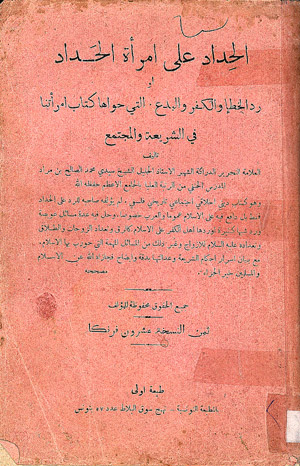
Deuil sur la femme de Haddad by Mohamed Salah Ben Mrad

Mohamed Salah Ben Mrad (Arabic: محمد صلاح بن مراد), (1881–1979) was a Tunisian theologian, journalist and intellectual. In 1931 he published Mourning on Haddad's Woman (ﺍﻟﺤﺪﺍﺩ ﻋﻠﻰ ﺍﻣﺮأﺓ ﺍﻟﺤﺪﺍﺩ), objecting to the expanded rights for women that were advocated by Tahar Haddad in his book Our Women in the Sharia and Society, published one year earlier.

== Biography ==
=== Youth ===
Born in the Medina of Tunis near the Tourbet el Bey, Mohamed Salah was the son of the Hanafi Bach-mufti, Sheikh H'mida Ben Mrad, a specialist in rhetoric and the elder brother of the sheikhs Neji (who served as qadi and mufti) and Brahim Ben Mrad (who served as imam, teacher at the Zaytuna, and judge at the Tunis tribunal). He came from a family of Tunis scholars and intellectuals of Ottoman origin, from Turkey. Dating back to the sixteenth century, his grandfather Murad Khodja was part of the military army of Sinan Pasha, who participated in the battle of La Goulette against the army of Charles V in 1574. He completed his studies at the Zaytuna and left in 1900.

=== Publication ===
In Ben Mrad’s book entitled Mourning on Haddad's Woman (الحداد على امرأة الحداد), published in 1931, Ben Mrad rejects the ideas of Tahar Haddad on the status of women in Tunisia, based on the scriptural texts of the Koran. The book follows an outcry from scholars of the court of Sharia, and much of the population was in favor of Haddad’s new ideas. He defends the idea of Tunisian women wearing "safsari", which he finds not a sign of religious identification but a more traditional dress akin to a national uniform shared by all social groups. He also rejects the idea that social reforms can be accomplished without the time necessary for their understanding and assimilation by a colonized population still largely illiterate. According to him, the emancipation of Tunisian women must come first through instruction and education. He acknowledged, however, that some of Haddad’s ideas are not opposed to the Sharia on the status of women. This was done in the journal that he founded in 1937 - Shams al-Islam (The sun of Islam).

=== Religious leader ===
He was appointed as the Sheikh el Islam in the kingdom by Moncef Bey in 1942. After the removal of the latter, on the occasion of the inauguration of the new Bey Lamine by General Alphonse Juin, he insisted, in his speech to the king, on his role as guarantor of the monarchy and the Husseinite throne, suggesting that there is a void left by Moncef Bey in the heart of Tunisians. In 1944 he helped set up the reform commission's Zaytuna University, chaired by Sheikh Mohammed and President Tahar Ben Achour, responding to the wishes of Tunisian intellectuals and zeytounien students, concerned about the future of the oldest university in the Arab-Muslim world. Under pressure from the resident general of France in Tunisia, Charles Mast, Sheikh Ben Mrad was dismissed from his post in 1946 because of his political commitment to nationalist leaders of the Neo-Destour imprisoned and exiled, and in favor of the union movement of the General Union of Tunisian Workers - Farhat Hached.

=== Family ===
In 1937, his daughter, Bchira Ben Mrad, founded the first women's organization —the Tunisian Union of Muslim Women in Tunisia—with the support of her father and sisters, getting numerous articles published in her father’s journal. Contrary to what some thought, the sheikh gave his daughters a modern education that closely mingled with the intellectual and cultural life in Tunis.
