= Avec le temps (EP) =

EP by Isleym
- Released: 15 November 2010
- Genre: R&B, French hip hop
- Length: 10:42
- Label: 7th Magnitude
- Producer: Dany Synthé, Skread

Isleym chronology
| Avec le temps (2010) | Où ça nous mène (2014) |

Singles from Avec le temps
- 1. "Avec le temps" Released: April 1, 2011

Avec le temps is an extended play by French singer-songwriter Isleym. It was released as a digital download on iTunes on 15 November 2010.

== Singles ==
Avec le temps produced 1 single:

- "Avec le temps" was released as the lead single of the EP on 1 April 2011. It peaked at number 79 on the French Singles Chart, and number 47 on the Belgian Ultratip 50 chart in Wallonia.

== Track listing ==
| No. | Title | Producer(s) | Length |
|---|---|---|---|
| 1. | "Avec le temps" | Dany Synthé | 2:51 |
| 2. | "À chaque jour suffit sa peine" (remix) | Skread | 3:41 |
| 3. | "Ma solitude" (featuring Nessbeal) | Dany Synthé | 4:10 |

Notes

- "À chaque jour suffit sa peine" was originally performed by Nessbeal.
