= Lina Zahr Eddine =

Lebanese news presenter and talk show host

Lina Zahreddine
- Lina Zahreddine in 2009
- Born: 12 July 1975 (age 50); Mays al Jabal, Lebanon
- Occupations: Journalist, news presenter

Lina Zahr Eddine (Arabic: لينا زهر الدين) is a Lebanese news presenter and talk show host.

== Early life ==
Lina was born on 12 July 1975 in Mays al Jabal, Nabatieh Governorate, after the beginning of the Lebanese civil war to Shia family. She attended the local Fakhreddine school in Beirut, Lebanon through High School and then got her college degree in Media and Documentation from the Lebanese University.

== Career ==
Lina started her career in early 1997. She worked in NBN, a Lebanese TV as a reporter & radio news presenter. In 2002, she moved to Al Jazeera news TV in Doha, Qatar. In June 2012, she began to work in Al Mayadeen, a pan-Arab television channel in Lebanon. She resigned on 24 November 2019, during the 2019–20 Lebanese protests.

== Personal life ==
Lina was married to a Lebanese businessman, before she got divorced with two kids.
