= Isleym =

French singer-songwriter (born 1994)

- Born: 13 June 1994 (age 32); Villiers-sur-Marne, France
- Occupations: Singer, songwriter
- Instrument: Vocals
- Years active: 2008–present
- Label: 7th Magnitude
- Website: Isleym on Skyrock

Isleym (French pronunciation: [izˈlɛm]; born 13 June 1994) is a French singer-songwriter. A member of the 7th Magnitude record label, she released her debut studio album, Où ça nous mène, on 21 April 2014.

== Career ==
Isleym began writing songs at the age of 10, and says that her first performance was singing at her mother's birthday. When she saw the positive reaction of the people around her, she decided to begin pursuing a serious career in music.

At the age of 14, Isleym was discovered by French rapper Nessbeal and record producer Skread, and was later signed to Skread's record label 7th Magnitude. In 2010, Isleym released her first single, entitled "Ma solitude" featuring Nessbeal, and the same year she released an extended play entitled Avec le temps with 3 tracks, including a remix of "À chaque jour suffit sa peine" by Nessbeal.

On 11 March 2013, Isleym released a music video of her song "Art de rue" featuring Don Choa, with an appearance from Orelsan, and on 21 May 2014 released her debut studio album, Où ça nous mène, which has peaked at number 45 in the French Albums Chart as of 10 May 2014.

== Discography ==
Studio albums

2020 EP - Jumanji

- 2014 – Où ça nous mène

Extended plays

2022 EP - Piquée

- 2010 – Avec le temps

Singles

- 2010 – "Ma solitude" (featuring Nessbeal)
- 2011 – "Avec le temps"
- 2012 – "Risques et périls"
- 2013 – "Art de rue"
- 2013 – "Petit bateau"
- 2014 – "Oublie-moi"
