= Mustapha Tlili =

Tunisian novelist

Mustapha Tlili (Tunisian Arabic: مصطفى التليلي; born 17 October 1937 – 20 October 2017) was a Tunisian novelist. Born in Fériana, Tunisia, Mustapha Tlili was educated at the Sorbonne and in the United States. He worked at the United Nations from 1967 to 1982.

Tlili died on 20 October 2017, aged 80.

== Works ==
- La rage aux tripes [Visceral Anger], 1975
- Le bruit dort [The Noise Sleeps], 1978
- Gloire des sables [Glory of the Sands], 1982
- (ed. with Jacques Derrida) For Nelson Mandela, New York: Seaver Books, 1987
- La montagne du lion [Lion Mountain], Paris: Gallimard, 1988. Translated by Linda Coverdale as Lion Mountain, New York: Arcade Pub., 1990.
