= Ghassan bin Jiddo =

Tunisian Lebanese journalist (born 1962)

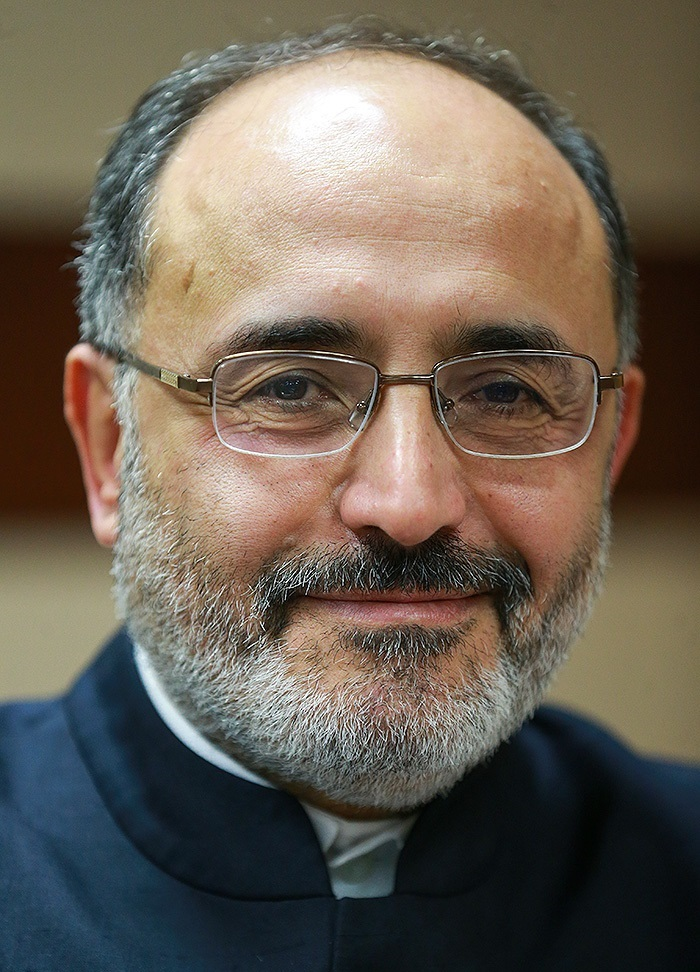
- Ghassan bin Jiddo at Fars News Agency office, Tehran on February 19, 2017
- Born: 8 August 1962 (age 64); El Ksour, Tunisia
- Occupation: Journalist

Ghassan bin Jiddo or Ghassan ben Jeddou (Arabic: غسان بن جدو; born 8 August 1962) is a veteran Tunisian-Lebanese journalist activist, and the director of Beirut-based pan-Arab satellite television channel Al Mayadeen. He has been recognized by Arabian Business as an influential Arab personality.

== Early life and education ==
Ghassan bin Jiddo was born to a Muslim Tunisian father and a Christian Lebanese mother in El Ksour, Tunisia. He studied in Tunisia and was a student activist during his education years.

== Career ==
Jiddo began his journalism career as a correspondent for the BBC Network, Al Hayat and other Arab newspapers as well as the Arab Institute for International Studies in Washington. Later, he began to serve as the bureau chief of Al Jazeera in Iran. Then, he became the bureau chief of Al Jazeera in Beirut. However, in April 2011, he resigned from Al Jazeera claiming that the channel lacked of professionalism and objectivity in covering the Arab Spring. It was claimed that he did not endorse the station’s full coverage of the situation in Libya, Yemen, and Syria, while completely ignoring the crisis in Bahrain.

In 2012, Jiddo became the director of Beirut-based pan-Arab satellite television station, Al Mayadeen, launched on 11 June 2012.

=== Notable works ===
During his Al Jazeera years, Jiddo worked on a documentary about Hezbollah. He had an exclusive interview with the secretary general of Hezbollah, Hassan Nasrallah, during the Israel-Lebanon conflict in 2006. In the same year, he also interviewed Julia Boutros, Walid Jumblat and former Cuban president Fidel Castro. He was regarded as the most watched and most popular presenter on Al Jazeera in 2007. He became an influential figure on the Al Jazeera network in 2010 with his program Hiwar Maftuh (Arabic: "Open dialogue"). He made insightful interviews with decision makers in his talk-show, receiving much acclaim for Al Jazeerah's coverage of the war in Lebanon in 2006.

== Views ==
After his resignation from Al Jazeera, Jiddo claimed that the opposition in Syria and those who support them are responsible for the spilled Syrian blood, asserting that real opposition should never use weapons and violence against the citizens. Jiddo also appreciated Bashar al-Assad's ongoing reforms which disappointed those who wanted to interfere in Syria's internal affairs. In June 2012, he argued "the regime of Bashar Al Assad is being subject to an international conspiracy".

== Personal life ==
Jiddo is married to an Iranian woman, Neda Ghaemmaghami. Originally a Tunisian citizen, Ghassan has dual citizenship after acquiring the Lebanese nationality.

Jiddo was chosen to be the 24th most influential Arab among 100 Arab personalities by Arabian Business in 2007 and 59th most influential Arab in the world among 500 Arab personalities again by Arabian Business in 2011. He was mentioned as a possible successor to then Al Jazeera director general Wadah Khanfar.
