= Aalma ash-Shaab =

Aalma ash-Shaab علما الشعب 'Alma ash Sha'b
- Municipality
- Location within Lebanon
- Coordinates: 33°06′14″N 35°10′58″E
- Grid position: 167/278 PAL
- Country: Lebanon
- Governorate: South Governorate
- District: Tyre

Government
  - Mayor: Chadi Nayef Sayah

Population (2015)
  - Total: 1,080
- Time zone: GMT +3

Aalma ash-Shaab (alternatively spelled Aalma ech Chaab; Arabic: علما الشعب, romanized: ʿAlmā ash-Shaʿb) is a municipality in the Tyre District, in Southern Lebanon.

== Etymology ==
According to E. H. Palmer, ’Alma means "a coat of mail", while Shảub means "mountain spurs".

According to Anis Freyha in his dictionary of Lebanese settlement names, עלם ('A-L-M), the root of the name 'Alma, is Semitic and could mean "the hidden" or sexual maturity, the same as in Phoenician, Aramaic and Hebrew.

== History ==
=== Late Ottoman period ===
In 1875, during the late Ottoman period, Victor Guérin found here a village with 350 inhabitants, mostly Greek Catholics and Maronites.

In 1881, the PEF's Survey of Western Palestine (SWP) described it: "A large Christian village, containing about 500 inhabitants. The houses are clean and well built. There are two chapels, and the place seems increasing in size. It is situated on a ridge, with figs, olives, and pomegranates and arable land around. To the east and north the land is covered with brushwood. There is a spring within reach, and about thirty rock-cut cisterns in the village."

=== French Mandate period ===
During the transition to the French Mandate following World War I, the border regions of South Lebanon experienced significant security instability and inter-communal violence. On May 15, 1920, armed Shia Muslim and tribal irregulars operating in the western border sector launched a major assault on the Maronite Christian village of Aalma ash-Shaab.

The village was subjected to heavy pillaging, property destruction, and the systematic seizure of livestock. Approximately seven local residents were killed while attempting to defend the perimeter. The targeted violence forced the majority of the village's population to abandon their homes and flee toward the coast of Tyre, where they sought humanitarian and military protection from French naval vessels anchored offshore.

=== Contemporary ===
In 2009, there were 400 members of the Saint-Élie (Elijah) parish of the Melkite Church in the village.

Since the beginning of the Gaza war, Shia Islamist group Hezbollah joined the conflict by launching rocket and drone attacks on the occupied Shebaa Farms and Israel from areas in southern Lebanon. As a result, at least 800 residents have fled the village out of fear of getting caught in the crossfire, with only about 100 remaining. Israel has conducted retaliatory strikes targeting what they claim is "Hezbollah infrastructure", which according to the deputy mayor destroyed several structures in the village. In March 2026, the brother of the town's parish priest was killed in an Israeli strike, and most of the village's residents were evacuated north.

== Demographics ==
In 2014, Christians made up 98.06% of registered voters in Aalma ash-Shaab. 42.62% of the voters were Maronite Catholics and 39.19% were Greek Catholics.

== Climate ==
Climate data for Aalma ash-Shaab, elevation 385 m (1,263 ft)
Month	Jan	Feb	Mar	Apr	May	Jun	Jul	Aug	Sep	Oct	Nov	Dec	Year
Mean daily maximum °C (°F)	15.8 (60.4)	16.1 (61.0)	18.8 (65.8)	21.7 (71.1)	25.6 (78.1)	28.2 (82.8)	29.5 (85.1)	30.6 (87.1)	28.5 (83.3)	26.5 (79.7)	22.7 (72.9)	18.3 (64.9)	23.5 (74.4)
Daily mean °C (°F)	12.1 (53.8)	12.5 (54.5)	14.3 (57.7)	16.6 (61.9)	20.2 (68.4)	22.7 (72.9)	24.1 (75.4)	25.5 (77.9)	23.7 (74.7)	21.7 (71.1)	18.2 (64.8)	14.6 (58.3)	18.8 (66.0)
Mean daily minimum °C (°F)	9.5 (49.1)	9.6 (49.3)	10.3 (50.5)	12.3 (54.1)	15.3 (59.5)	17.6 (63.7)	19.2 (66.6)	21.0 (69.8)	19.8 (67.6)	18.1 (64.6)	14.8 (58.6)	11.8 (53.2)	14.9 (58.9)
Average precipitation mm (inches)	186 (7.3)	158 (6.2)	70 (2.8)	32 (1.3)	10 (0.4)	1 (0.0)	0 (0)	0 (0)	4 (0.2)	31 (1.2)	73 (2.9)	184 (7.2)	749 (29.5)
Source: FAO

== See also ==
- List of extrajudicial killings and political violence in Lebanon

== Bibliography ==
- Conder, C.R.; Kitchener, H.H. (1881). The Survey of Western Palestine: Memoirs of the Topography, Orography, Hydrography, and Archaeology. Vol. 1. London: Committee of the Palestine Exploration Fund.
- Guérin, V. (1880). Description Géographique Historique et Archéologique de la Palestine (in French). Vol. 3: Galilee, pt. 2. Paris: L'Imprimerie Nationale.
- Palmer, E.H. (1881). The Survey of Western Palestine: Arabic and English Name Lists Collected During the Survey by Lieutenants Conder and Kitchener, R. E. Transliterated and Explained by E.H. Palmer. Committee of the Palestine Exploration Fund.
