= Love Story =

Love Story or A Love Story may refer to:

== Arts, entertainment, and media ==
=== Genres ===
- Romance
  - Romance film
  - Romance novel

=== Films ===
- Love Story (1925 film), German silent film
- Love Story (1942 film), Italian drama film
- Love Story (1943 film), French film
- Love Story (1944 film), British film
- Love Story (1970 film), American romantic drama film based on Erich Segal's novel
- Love Story (1981 film), Indian Hindi-language romance film
- Love Story (1986 film), Indian Malayalam-language film
- Love Story (2006 British film), British documentary film about the band Love
- Love Story (2006 Singaporean film), Hong Kong-Singaporean romance film
- Love Story (2008 film), Indian Bengali-language romance directed by Raj Mukherjee
- Love Story (2011 Indonesian film), Indonesian film
- Love Story (2011 New Zealand film), New Zealand film
- Love Story (2012 film), Maldivian film
- Love Story (2013 film), Chinese romantic comedy film
- Love Story (2020 film), Indian Bengali-language film
- Love Story (2021 film), Indian Telugu-language film
- A Love Story (1933 film), French historical drama film
- A Love Story (1954 film), a German drama film
- A Love Story (2007 film), Filipino drama film
- A Love Story (2016 film), British animated short film
- Greeku Veerudu, Indian Telugu-language film dubbed into Tamil as Love Story
- Love Stories, 1997 Polish film

=== Literature ===
- Love Story (novel), a 1970 romance novel by Erich Segal
- Love Story, a 1933 play by S. N. Behrman
- Love Stories, a 2021 non-fiction book by Trent Dalton

=== Music ===
==== Albums and EPs ====
- Love Story (Andy Williams studio album), 1971
- Love Story (compilation album) by Andy Williams, 1971
- Love Story (Johnny Mathis album), 1971
- Love Story (Tony Bennett album), 1971
- Love Story (Lloyd Cole album), 1995
- Love Story (Yelawolf album), 2015
- Love Stories (album), a 2019 album by Eliane Elias
- A Love Story (Vivan Green album), 2002
- A Love Story (Des'ree album), 2019
- Love Story, a 2014 album by Tim McGraw
- Love Story, a 2007 album by Hayami Show
- Love Story, a 1968 EP by Usha Uthup
- Love Story, a 1987 album by Deric Wan
- Love Stories, a 1998 album by ABBA

==== Songs ====
- "(Where Do I Begin?) Love Story", the theme from the 1970 film Love Story
- "Love Story" (Nadia Ali song), 2009
- "Love Story" (Indila song), 2014
- "Love Story" (Jethro Tull song), 1968
- "Love Story" (Melody song), 2007
- "Love Story" (Taylor Swift song), 2008
- "Love Story (vs. Finally)", by Layo & Bushwacka!
- "Love Story", by Apink from Pink Blossom
- "Love Story", by Lagwagon from Let's Talk About Feelings
- "Love Story", by Mariah Carey from E=MC²
- "Love Story", by Rain from Rainism
- "Love Story", by Indila from Mini World
- "Love Story", by Katharine McPhee from Katharine McPhee, 2007
- "Love Story", by NEWS, 2019
- "Love Story", by NOFX from Heavy Petting Zoo
- "Love Story (You and Me)", by Randy Newman from Randy Newman

=== Television ===
==== Series ====
- Love Story (1954 TV series), a 1954 American program that aired on the DuMont Television Network
- Love Story (1973 TV series), a 1973 American anthology series that aired on NBC
- Love Story (Indian TV series), a 2007 Indian serial aired on SAB TV
- Love Story (British TV series), a British anthology series that aired 1963 to 1974
- Love Story, a TVB serial aired on TVB Jade from 1968 to 1969
- An American Love Story, a PBS documentary on Bill Sims
- India: A Love Story, a Brazilian telenovela by Gloria Perez, set in India
- Love Story (2026 TV series), a 2026 American anthology series, that serve as an installment in the American Story franchise

==== Episodes ====
- "Love Story" (M*A*S*H), a 1973 episode title
- Love Story, 1952 Hallmark Hall of Fame episode
- Love Stories (Girls)

=== Other uses in arts, entertainment, and media ===
- Love Story (musical), a 2010 stage musical inspired by the novel
- Love Story (video game), a 2000 Japanese full motion game for the PlayStation 2
- Love Story (webcomic), webtoon by Kang Full
- Love Story Magazine, an American romantic fiction pulp magazine, published from 1921 to 1947 and from 1952 to 1954

== See also ==
- My Love Story
- Prem Kahani (lit. 'Love Sory'), various Indian films
- Premachi Goshta (lit. 'Love Sory'), various Indian titles
- Dacoit: A Love Story, a 2026 Indian film
- Gangster: A Love Story, a 2006 Indian Hindi-language film by Anurag Basu
- Munna-A Love Story, a 2008 Indian Odia-language film
- Ek Prem Katha (lit. 'A Love Story'), may refer to these Indian Hindi-language films:
  - Gadar: Ek Prem Katha (2001)
  - Toilet: Ek Prem Katha (2017)
- Astitva...Ek Prem Kahani (lit. 'Reality...A Love Story'), a 2002 Indian TV series
- Love (2008 Bengali film), an Indian Bengali-language film based on Erich Segal's novel
- Romance
