= What You Saying =

2025 single by Lil Uzi Vert

Single by Lil Uzi Vert
- Released: December 22, 2025
- Genre: Jersey club
- Length: 2:11
- Label: Cor(e); Roc Nation
- Songwriters: Symere Woods; Mohamed Camara; Pascal Koeu; Karim Deneyer; Adila Sedraïa; Larry Gold
- Producer: MCVertt

Lil Uzi Vert singles chronology
"Regular" (2025)	"What You Saying" (2025)

Music video
- "What You Saying" on YouTube

"What You Saying" is a single by American rapper Lil Uzi Vert, released on December 22, 2025. Produced by MCVertt, it samples "Love Story" by Indila.

== Composition ==
"What You Saying" is a Jersey club-infused song. In the lyrics, Lil Uzi Vert admits there is a language barrier between them and the woman they are interested, but they have a strong romantic relationship regardless.

== Critical reception ==
Alexander Cole of HotNewHipHop called the song a "fun reimagination of the Jersey Club sound", commenting "Overall, this is an incredibly fun track, and one that will certainly make an impact over the Holiday break." Michael Saponara of Billboard described the song as "a genre-blending cocktail that makes LUV sonically feel right at home."

== Music video ==
An official music video was released alongside the single. It was directed by Charlotte Wales and was created with the involvement of Lil Uzi Vert, Ava Nirui (creative directors), Clare Byrne (stylist), Aaron de Mey (makeup), Joey George (hair), Lauren Nikrooz (set) and Celia Rowlson-Hall (choreography). The clip sees Uzi organizing a fashion show and opens with them sketching in their dark atelier; they are wearing their own Chanel jacket accessorized with a Helmut Lang feather collar over a Raf Simons shirt and fringe top, fingerless black leather gloves (in the style of Karl Lagerfeld), and half pink and half black dreads. In the next scene, Law Roach is styling Adriana Lima, who is wearing a glove top from Maison Margiela Spring 2001 with a Miss Claire Sullivan skirt and Helmut Lang heels. Dancers in Thom Browne move about the atelier, in reference to the racing with the clock scene from the film The Pajama Game. The clip additionally shows fictional interviews, similar to those from the film Zoolander. The runway show features models wearing full looks of Marc Jacobs' spring 2025 collection and is briefly interrupted by protesters, but ends smoothly with Lil Uzi Vert taking a bow and receiving a bouquet of flowers before a standing ovation. Dara, Andre Walker, Lynn Yaeger and Steff Yotka are among the audience. The clip also features cameos from Kyle Hagler, Jacobs, Lourdes Leon and Char Defrancesco and archival pieces from Jean Paul Gaultier. It concludes with Uzi in a faux post-show interview in which he credits Prince as his inspiration for the visual.

Lil Uzi Vert explained in an interview with Vogue:

This video was born out of a conversation that I had with Ava where I expressed an interest in including a mock 'Fashion TV'-style runway show in my first music video from my new album... We thought it would be cool to imagine an alternate universe where instead of me being a beloved rapper, I am a beloved fashion designer. It makes sense for me to have a music video inspired by the world of fashion, as I have always been an avid fashion fan and collector from a very young age. I thought it was important to include archival references to fashion designers I am a fan of, like Martin Margiela, Marc Jacobs, and Karl Lagerfeld in both the storyline and in the wardrobe. I recently released a music video for a song called "Chanel Boy", so I'm finding ways to pay my respects to fashion and the brands I like through my visuals and also my music.

== Charts ==
Chart performance
Chart (2025–2026)	Peak position
Australia (ARIA)	63
Australia Hip Hop/R&B (ARIA)	8
Austria (Ö3 Austria Top 40)	39
Canada Hot 100 (Billboard)	18
France Airplay (SNEP)	50
Germany (GfK)	71
Global 200 (Billboard)	18
Greece International (IFPI)	88
Ireland (IRMA)	34
Latvia Streaming (LaIPA)	20
Lithuania (AGATA)	33
Netherlands (Single Top 100)	53
New Zealand Hot Singles (RMNZ)	6
Nigeria (TurnTable Top 100)	15
Nigeria Airplay (TurnTable)	14
Norway (IFPI Norge)	52
Sweden (Sverigetopplistan)	45
Switzerland (Schweizer Hitparade)	24
UK Singles (Official Charts)	27
UK Hip Hop/R&B (Official Charts)	6
UK Indie (Official Charts)	8
US Billboard Hot 100	12
US Hot R&B/Hip-Hop Songs (Billboard)	3
US Pop Airplay (Billboard)	33
US Rhythmic Airplay (Billboard)	1

== Certifications ==
Certifications for "What You Saying"
Region	Certification	Certified units/sales
United States (RIAA)	Platinum	1,000,000^{‡}
^{‡} Sales+streaming figures based on certification alone.
