= Tourner dans le vide =

2014 song by Indila

Single by Indila

from the album Mini World
- Language: French
- Released: 24 March 2014
- Length: 4:06
- Label: Capitol; AZ; Universal
- Songwriters: Adila Sedraïa; Skalpovich
- Producer: Skalpovich

Indila singles chronology
"Dernière danse" (2013)	"Tourner dans le vide" (2014)	"S.O.S" (2014)

Music video
- "Tourner dans le vide" on YouTube

"Tourner dans le vide" (English: "Spinning in a void") is a song recorded by French singer-songwriter Indila from the album Mini World. It was released on 24 March 2014 through Capitol Records and AZ. The title is written by Indila and composed and produced by Skalpovich. A music video for the song, released on 11 April 2014, was shot at the Château de Ferrières.

== Charts ==
"Tourner dans le vide" chart performance
Chart	Peak position
Belgium (Ultratop 50 Wallonia)	11
France (SNEP)	13
Hungary (Single Top 40)	38
