= Dernière danse =

Single by Indila

from the album Mini World
- Language: French
- English title: "Last Dance"
- Released: 18 November 2013
- Recorded: 2013
- Studio: La Source Mastering (Courbevoie); Davout (Paris)
- Length: 3:32
- Label: Capitol; AZ
- Songwriter: Adila Sedraïa
- Producer: Skalpovich

Indila singles chronology
"Dreamin'" (2012)	"Dernière danse" (2013)	"Tourner dans le vide" (2014)

Music video
- "Dernière danse" on YouTube

"Dernière danse" (transl. "Last dance") is a song recorded by French singer-songwriter Indila. Serving as the lead single of her 2014 album Mini World, it was released on 18 November 2013 through Capitol Records and AZ. Less than ten years after its release, on 19 May 2023, it became the first French-language song to exceed one billion views on YouTube.

== Commercial performance ==
The song reached number two spot in home market singles charts (France and Belgium), and number one spot on singles charts in Greece, Israel, Romania and Turkey. On 1 March 2014, it entered the Greek charts at number-one and spent seven weeks at number one. On 19 April 2014, it was knocked down to No. 2 by Pharrell Williams' "Happy". It reclaimed No. 1 the following week, and remained there for another five weeks, totaling at thirteen weeks at No. 1.

== Music video ==
The music video for the song was released on 4 December 2013. The video is intercut with scenes of Indila singing in front of a wide view of Paris. The story begins with Indila being kicked out of her house and she wanders throughout Paris being disrespected by the locals as the city gets darker due to a storm beginning. It is implied that the storm is connected with Indila's negative emotions, as shown in a brief flashback. Indila then walks directly into the storm and seemingly clears it by using her singing voice, saving Paris.

As of August 2026, the video has gathered over 1.4 billion views, being the only French-language song to achieve this.

== Charts ==
=== Weekly charts ===
2014 weekly chart performance
Chart (2014)	Peak position
Austria (Ö3 Austria Top 40)	72
Belgium (Ultratop 50 Flanders)	5
Belgium (Ultratop 50 Wallonia)	2
Czech Republic Airplay (ČNS IFPI)	23
Czech Republic Singles Digital (ČNS IFPI)	94
France (SNEP)	2
Germany (GfK)	47
Greece Airplay (IFPI)	1
Greece Digital (Billboard)	1
Hungary (Single Top 40)	24
Israel International Airplay (Media Forest)	1
Italy Airplay (EarOne)	52
Lebanon (Lebanese Top 20)	3
Moldova Airplay (Media Forest)	2
Moldova TV Airplay (Media Forest)	5
Netherlands (Single Tip)	9
Poland Airplay (ZPAV)	3
Poland (Polish TV Airplay)	2
Romania (Airplay 100)	2
Romania Airplay (Media Forest)	1
Romania TV Airplay (Media Forest)	1
Slovakia Airplay (ČNS IFPI)	14
Slovakia Singles Digital (ČNS IFPI)	71
Switzerland (Schweizer Hitparade)	15
Turkey International Airplay (MusicTopTR)	1

2023 weekly chart performance
Chart (2023)	Peak position
Romania Airplay (TopHit)	91

2024 weekly chart performance
Chart (2024)	Peak position
Austria (Ö3 Austria Top 40)	46
France (SNEP)	69
Germany (GfK)	46
Netherlands (Single Top 100)	55

2025 weekly chart performance
Chart (2025)	Peak position
France (SNEP)	178
Moldova Airplay (TopHit)	56

=== Year-end charts ===
Chart (2014)	Position
Belgium (Ultratop Wallonia)	3
France (SNEP)	4
Israel Airplay (Media Forest)	11
Poland (Polish Airplay Top 100)	20
Romania (Airplay 100)	3
Chart (2024)	Position
France (SNEP)	128
Switzerland (Schweizer Hitparade)	88

== Certifications ==
"Dernière danse" certifications
Region	Certification	Certified units/sales
Belgium (BRMA)	Platinum	30,000^{*}
Brazil (Pro-Música Brasil)	Gold	30,000^{‡}
Denmark (IFPI Danmark)	Platinum	90,000^{‡}
France	—	128,200
Germany (BVMI)	Platinum	600,000^{‡}
Italy (FIMI)	Gold	50,000^{‡}
New Zealand (RMNZ)	Gold	15,000^{‡}
Spain (Promusicae) (since 2015)	Platinum	60,000^{‡}
United Kingdom (BPI)	Gold	400,000^{‡}
United States (RIAA)	Gold	500,000^{‡}
^{*} Sales figures based on certification alone.^{‡} Sales+streaming figures based on certification alone.

== Covers ==
- Natacha Andréani performed the song on the third season of the French version of The Voice.
- "Anno 1800 Soundtrack - The Rains" - Composed by Armin Haas, Dynamedion for Anno 1800.
- In 2021, Shanguy, Yves V and Alex Cooper released a cover of the song.
- On 20 January 2026, Israeli singer Noam Bettan performed the song during the final episode of the twelfth season of the Israeli reality singing competition HaKokhav HaBa. This version peaked at number 78 on the official Mako Hitlist Israeli Chart.
