= Love Story (Indila song) =

2014 song by Indila

- Digital single cover (Note: A single cover for CD features the same artwork with her debut studio album, Mini World (2014), but the title is changed from "Mini World" to "Love Story".)

Single by Indila

from the album Mini World
- Language: French
- Released: 27 October 2014
- Length: 5:16
- Label: Capitol; AZ
- Songwriters: Skalpovich; Indila
- Producer: Skalpovich

Indila singles chronology
"Run Run" (2014)	"Love Story" (2014)	"Garde L'équilibre" (2015)

Music video
- "Love Story" on YouTube

"Love Story" is a song by French singer-songwriter Indila. It was released on 27 October 2014 via Capitol Records and AZ as the fifth and last single from her debut studio album, Mini World (2014). The song speaks of a love story.

== Commercial performance ==
"Love Story" failed to reproduce the success of the singles from her album Mini World (2014); it has entered Belgium and her native country France, at number 48 and 57, respectively. However, the song became popularised several years later, particularly on TikTok. The YouTube clip of "Love Story" has accumulated more than 483 million views as of April 2026.

In 2025, the song was sampled in "What You Saying" by Lil Uzi Vert.

== Music video ==
The music video of "Love Story" is a continuation of her previous single "S.O.S" video, ending with a panel bearing the inscription "Love Story". Filmed in Iceland and directed by Karim Ouaret, with Jalane in production, it was unveiled on 17 November 2014 via YouTube.

=== Synopsis ===
The music video tells the story of an elderly and widowed man with his love of the past. Indila sings there standing on a block of ice. Several scenes appeared during the video, with a child sitting on the edge of his bed, an old man leaving his house and then laying a rose on his wife's grave, and a woman with her companion who is about to board a boat.

== Personnel ==
Credits were adapted from the liner notes of Mini World.

- Indila – lead vocals
- Skalpovich – production, programming, orchestration, keyboards

== Charts ==
Charts (2014–2015)	Peak position
Belgium (Ultratop 50 Wallonia)	48
France (SNEP)	57
