= Prem Kahani =

Prem Kahani (lit. 'Love Story') may refer to:

- Prem Kahani (1937 film), 1937 Indian Hindi-language film
- Prem Kahani (1975 film), 1975 Indian Hindi-language film
- Prem Kahani (2009 film), 2009 Indian Kannada-language film

== See also ==
- Love Story (disambiguation)
- Premer Kahini, a 2008 Indian Bengali-language film
