= Mini World (album) =

- Standard cover

Studio album by Indila
- Released: 24 February 2014
- Studios: La Source Mastering (Courbevoie); Davout (Paris)
- Length: 43:14
- Language: French
- Labels: Capitol France; AZ; Island Def Jam
- Producer: Skalp

Singles from Mini World
- 1. "Dernière danse" Released: 18 November 2013; 2. "Tourner dans le vide" Released: 24 March 2014; 3. "S.O.S" Released: 9 June 2014; 4. "Run Run" Released: 22 September 2014; 5. "Love Story" Released: 27 October 2014

Mini World is the debut and only studio album by the French singer-songwriter Indila. It was released on 24 February 2014 by Capitol Music France.

To date, it has sold over 630,000 copies in France and approximately 850,000 worldwide, particularly in Belgium and Romania, where it was certified gold, as well as in Poland, where it received a diamond certification.

== Singles ==
The lead single, "Dernière danse", was released on 18 November 2013. Its music video premiered on 5 December, featuring intercut scenes of Indila singing against a panoramic view of Paris. As of December 2024, the video has garnered over 1.228 billion views, making it the only French song to reach this milestone. Following "Dernière danse", "Tourner dans le vide" was released as the album's second single on 24 March 2014.

On 9 June, the third single from the album, "S.O.S", was released. Its music video, shot in Greece, premiered on 27 June. On 22 September, the album's fourth single, "Run Run" was released. "Love Story" was released as the fifth and final single from the album, on 27 October. She teased then-upcoming music video of the song on 15 November, sharing an exclusive image which shows a caption of her name and the song's title "Love Story" floating on a glacier. The video premiered at YouTube on 17 November. Directed by Karim Ouaret, it serves as a continuation of the "S.O.S" video, which itself concludes with a panel displaying the inscription "Love Story".

== Commercial performance ==
In Indila's home country of France, the album debuted at number one on the French Albums Chart and finished within the top three on the 2014 year-end chart. The album also reached number one in several European territories, including Belgium (Wallonia) and Poland, where it additionally placed at the top of the Polish year-end albums chart for 2014. Elsewhere, Mini World peaked within the top five in Greece and the top 20 in Switzerland, while also charting in Germany and the Netherlands. Outside continental Europe, it entered the US Billboard's World Albums chart, reaching the top 15.

Mini World was named Revelation Album of the Year at the 2015 Victoires de la Musique.

== Credits and personnel ==
Credits were adapted from the album's liner notes.

Recording locations

- La Source Mastering (Courbevoie) – mastering studio
- Studios Davout (Paris) – recording, mixing

Musicians

- Indila – vocals, songwriter
- Skalpovich – music, production

Production

- Skalpovich – recording, mixing, producer
- Karim Deneyer – executive producer
- JP Chalbos – mastering
- Michèle Domi – A&R
- Noor – image consultant

Artwork and design

- Jérôme Colliard – artwork
- Darius Salimi – cover photography
- Lisa Roze – booklet photography
- Vincent Le Faou – photography assistant
- Kim Roselier – illustrations ("Dernière Danse", "Tu ne m'entends pas")

== Track listing ==
All songs written by Adila Sedraïa and produced by Pascal "Skalp" Koeu.

Mini World – standard edition
| No. | Title | Length |
|---|---|---|
| 1. | "Dernière danse" | 3:33 |
| 2. | "Tourner dans le vide" | 4:06 |
| 3. | "Love Story" | 5:16 |
| 4. | "S.O.S" | 4:32 |
| 5. | "Comme un bateau" | 4:55 |
| 6. | "Run Run" | 3:45 |
| 7. | "Ego" | 4:16 |
| 8. | "Boîte en argent" | 4:25 |
| 9. | "Tu ne m'entends pas" | 3:17 |
| 10. | "Mini World" | 5:09 |
| Total length: | | 43:17 |

Mini World – deluxe edition
| No. | Title | Length |
|---|---|---|
| 11. | "Tourner dans le vide" (orchestral version) | 3:49 |
| 12. | "Love Story" (orchestral version) | 5:00 |
| 13. | "S.O.S." (acoustic version) | 4:00 |

Mini World – limited edition
| No. | Title | Length |
|---|---|---|
| 11. | "Ainsi bas la vida" | 3:36 |
| 12. | "Feuille d'automne" | 4:01 |
| 13. | "Tourner dans le vide" (orchestral version) | 3:49 |
| 14. | "Love Story" (orchestral version) | 5:00 |
| 15. | "S.O.S." (acoustic version) | 4:00 |

Mini World – limited edition bonus DVD
| No. | Title | Length |
|---|---|---|
| 1. | "Dernière danse" (W9 Home Concert) |
| 2. | "Love Story" (W9 Home Concert) |
| 3. | "S.O.S." (W9 Home Concert) |
| 4. | "Tourner Dans Le Vide" (W9 Home Concert) |
| 5. | "Run Run" (W9 Home Concert) |
| 6. | "Dernière danse" (orchestral version à cordes) |
| 7. | "Dernière danse" (video) |
| 8. | "Tourner dans le vide" (video) |
| 9. | "S.O.S." (video) |
| 10. | "Mini World" (trailer) |

== Charts ==
=== Weekly charts ===
| Chart (2014) | Peak position |
|---|---|
| Belgian Albums (Ultratop Flanders) | 16 |
| Belgian Albums (Ultratop Wallonia) | 1 |
| Dutch Albums (Album Top 100) | 73 |
| French Albums (SNEP) | 1 |
| German Albums (Offizielle Top 100) | 32 |
| Greek Albums (IFPI) | 3 |
| Polish Albums (ZPAV) | 1 |
| Swiss Albums (Schweizer Hitparade) | 11 |
| US World Albums (Billboard) | 11 |

=== Year-end charts ===
| Chart (2014) | Position |
|---|---|
| Belgium Albums (Ultratop Flanders) | 43 |
| Belgium Albums (Ultratop Wallonia) | 2 |
| France Albums (SNEP) | 3 |
| Poland Albums (ZPAV) | 1 |
| Swiss Albums (Schweizer Hitparade) | 32 |
| Chart (2015) | Position |
| French Albums (SNEP) | 34 |
| Polish Albums (ZPAV) | 7 |
| Chart (2022) | Position |
| Belgian Albums (Ultratop Wallonia) | 187 |
| Chart (2025) | Position |
| Belgian Albums (Ultratop Wallonia) | 166 |

== Certifications ==
Mini World certifications
| Region | Certification | Certified units/sales |
|---|---|---|
| Belgium (BRMA) | Platinum | 30,000^{*} |
| Denmark (IFPI Danmark) | Gold | 10,000^{‡} |
| France (SNEP) | Diamond | 630,000 |
| Germany (BVMI) | Gold | 100,000^{‡} |
| Poland (ZPAV) | Diamond | 100,000^{‡} |
^{*} Sales figures based on certification alone.^{‡} Sales+streaming figures based on certification alone.

== Release history ==
Mini World release history
| Region | Date | Format(s) | Edition | Label | Ref. |
|---|---|---|---|---|---|
| Various | 24 February 2014 | CD; digital download; streaming | Standard; deluxe | Capitol France; AZ; Universal | |
| France | 24 February 2014 | CD | Deluxe | Capitol France; AZ; Universal | |
| Germany | 28 February 2014 | CD; digital download; streaming | Standard | Capitol France; AZ; Universal | |
| United Kingdom | 28 March 2014 | CD; digital download; streaming | Standard | Capitol France; AZ; Universal | |
| Poland | 20 May 2014 | CD; digital download; streaming | Standard | Universal Polska | |
| Various | 17 November 2014 | Digital download; streaming | Limited | Island Def Jam | |
| Various | 17 November 2014 | CD | DVD | Capitol; AZ | |
