= Parle à ta tête =

2019 single by Indila

Single by Indila
- Released: 23 August 2019
- Recorded: 2019
- Genre: Electro pop
- Length: 2:58
- Label: Capitol
- Songwriter: Adila Sedraïa
- Producer: Skalpovich

Indila singles chronology
"Garde L'équilibre" (2015)	"Parle à ta tête" (2019)	"Carrousel" (2020)

Music video
- "Parle à ta tête" on YouTube

"Parle à ta tête" (English: "Speak to Your Head") is a song by French singer-songwriter Indila. Produced by Skalpovich, it was released through Capitol Music Group on 23 August 2019.

== Background ==
In an interview, Indila shared details on the preparation of her then second album:

I decided to put the brakes on. It sometimes becomes necessary. What matters to me is to release an album that looks like me and that is the most thoughtful.

On 20 August 2019, three days prior to the song's release, she tweeted an apology for her four year long hiatus and hinted at her return with the new single, saying:

At least 4 years of silence I think? Sorry to those for whom it seemed like an eternity ... Without transition, I am getting back on the Train of Dreamers. Welcome aboard

"Parle à ta tête" was released on 23 August 2019 and would be included in her second album.

== Music video ==
The accompanying music video for the song was released on 14 November 2019 on her YouTube channel. The shorter length version was released on 18 December 2019, and is three minutes and eighteen seconds long, whereas the longer version is five minutes and fifty-eight seconds. It begins with Indila in Santa Apolónia train station, in Lisbon. She emerges from a magical suitcase with a monkey. A porter delivers a pram to her, and she wheels it away. She then joins a queue, where the other people start to mouth the words to her song, and she is unexpectedly accosted by dancers who take her pram. She then finds herself in a palour, and walks through a mirror into an opera house. She encounters a mic in the stage and orders the monkey to be quiet so she may sing. In the next scene, she awakes with a flash mob singing the last chorus while recording with their smartphones and they unexpectedly disperse. Awed by the people, Indila picks a flower, and observes the Montmartre using a telescope. The video ends with Indila smiling and holding a piece of paper. It was directed by her along with Karim Ouaret.

== Follow-Up to Parle à ta tête ==
Following "Parle à ta tête", her second album was to be released in the first quarter of 2020. According to Purecharts, Indila had an album in preparation but disputes with her Record Label in releasing the second album causing delays. Her song "S.O.S" foreshadowed disputes in the future with songs and hoped fans would notice the song as a sign for help. Purecharts also reported that the second album may have not have been released due to the poor and unexpected performance of "Parle à ta tête".

== Charts ==
Chart (2019)	Peak position
Belgium (Ultratip Bubbling Under Wallonia)	20

== Certifications ==
Certifications for "Parle à ta tête"
Region	Certification	Certified units/sales
France (SNEP)	Gold	100,000^{‡}
^{‡} Sales+streaming figures based on certification alone.
