= Premachi Goshta =

Premachi Goshta (lit. 'Love Story') may refer to:

- Premachi Goshta (film), a 2013 Indian Marathi-language film
- Premachi Goshta 2 (film), a 2025 Indian Marathi-language film
- Premachi Goshta (TV series), a 2023 Indian TV series, a Marathi-language remake of Yeh Hai Mohabbatein

== See also ==
- Love Story (disambiguation)
