= Indila =

French singer-songwriter (born 1984)

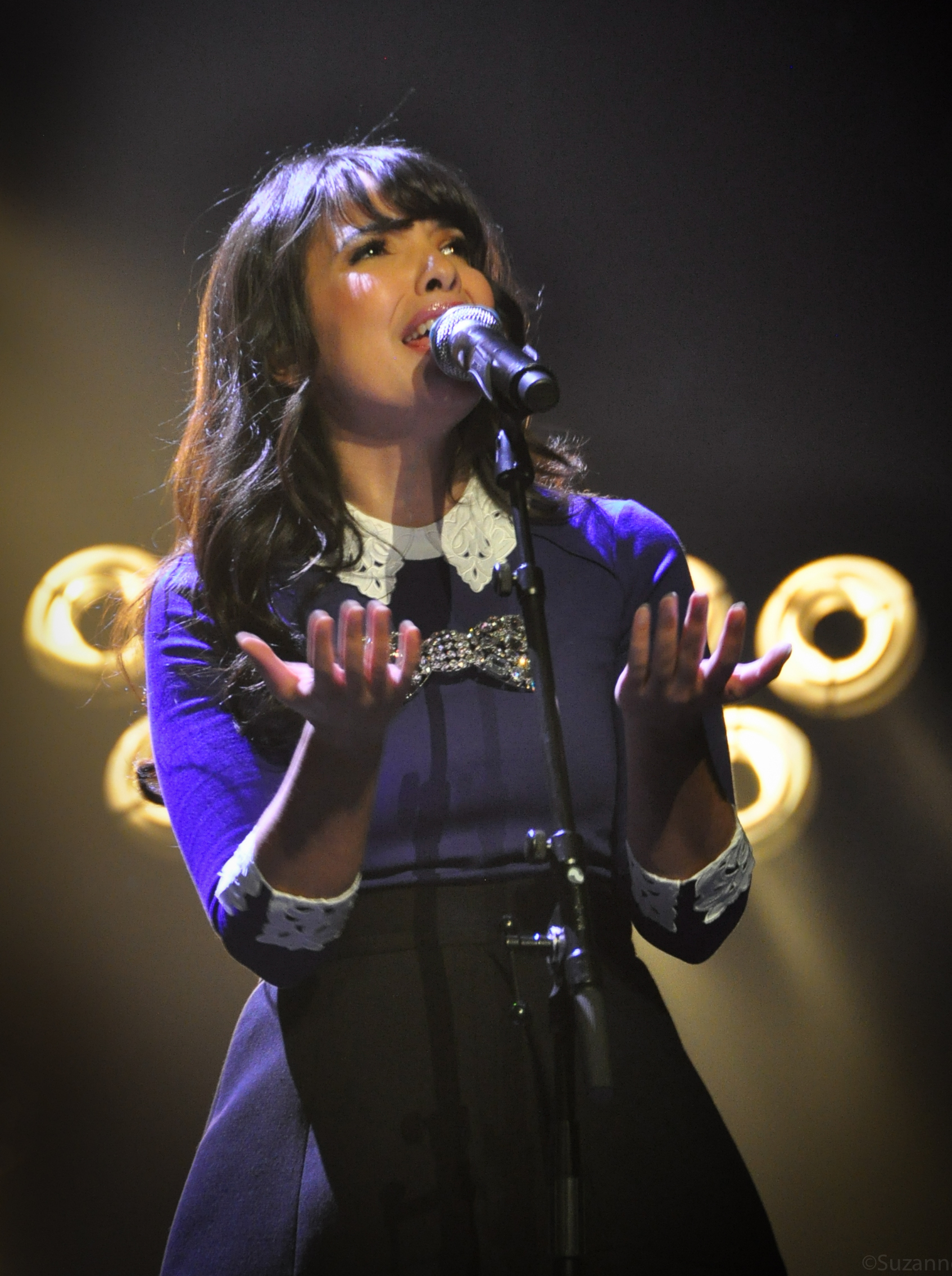
- Indila performing at the 2015 EBBA Awards

Background information
- Also known as: Indila
- Born: Adila Sedraïa; 26 June 1984 (age 42); Paris, France
- Genre: World
- Years active: 2005–present
- Label: Polydor France
- Spouse: Skalpovich (m. 2007)

Adila Sedraïa (French pronunciation: [adila sedʁaja]; born 26 June 1984), known professionally as Indila (pronounced [indila]), is a French singer, songwriter and record producer. She collaborated with many musicians on vocals and lyrics prior to releasing her debut single, "Dernière danse", in December 2013, which peaked at number two on the SNEP chart in France. Her studio album, Mini World, followed in February 2014 and was met with commercial success.

== Early life ==
Adila Sedraïa was born on 26 June 1984, in Paris, France. Her mother was a caregiver, while her grandmother sang at weddings. Indila has two sisters, and she described herself as a "child of the world", as she’s of Algerian, Cambodian, Indian, and Egyptian descent. Prior to her singing career, she worked as a tour guide at the Marché international de Rungis. She explained that her stage name came from her immeasurable love for India.

In addition to her native French, Indila has provided vocals in English, including "Dreamin'" with French and Congolese rapper Youssoupha and "Bye Bye Sonyé" with Moroccan-French musician DJ Abdel, and sung Hindi-language refrains in "Criminel" by French band TLF and "Thug mariage" by French rapper Rohff.

== Career ==
=== 2009–2012: Featuring vocals ===
Indila's meeting with record producer Skalpovich eventually allowed her to enter into the world of rap and eventually collaborate with several French rappers. Her first provided vocals under her stage name around 2009 for "Invitaation" by Vitaa, "Trinité" by L'Algérino, "Thug mariage" by Rohff, "Hiro" by Soprano, and composing "J'ai besoin d'y croire," sung by Admiral T and among others. "Hiro" was Indila's first successful collaboration, reaching number 26 in the charts in France and 27 in Belgium. She continued to collaborate with several other French rappers and DJs over the next three years, including "Poussière d'empire" with Nessbeal, "Criminel" with TLF, "Press pause" with OGB, "Bye Bye Sonyé" with DJ Abdel, "Dreamin" with Youssoupha, which peaked in July 2012 at number 14 in France's SNEP charts, and "Ma Reine" with Axel Tony. Indila also composed the songs "Plus Haut" by Matt Pokora along with "Avec Toi" by Axel Tony featuring Tunisiano, in which she is credited by her real name, Adila Sedraïa. "Avec Toi", which was produced by Skalpovich, reached number 7 in the charts in France in November 2012.

=== 2013–2014: Mini World and its commercial success ===
In November 2013, Indila released her first single, "Dernière danse" (English: "Last Dance"), from her then-upcoming debut studio album. It reached the top 10 of the French charts on 4 January 2014 and reached number 2 on 18 January, where it remained through the week of 22 March. The song remained in the top 200 in France through April 2015, for a total of 77 weeks in the top 200. It was also a success outside France, by the end of February 2014; "Dernière danse" was the numbers one and two song on iTunes in Greece and Romania as well as Turkey, respectively. The music video for the song, released 4 December 2013, reached 100 million views on YouTube on 30 July 2014 and has over 1.4 billion views as of 22 November 2026, which marked the first French-language song to exceed one billion views.

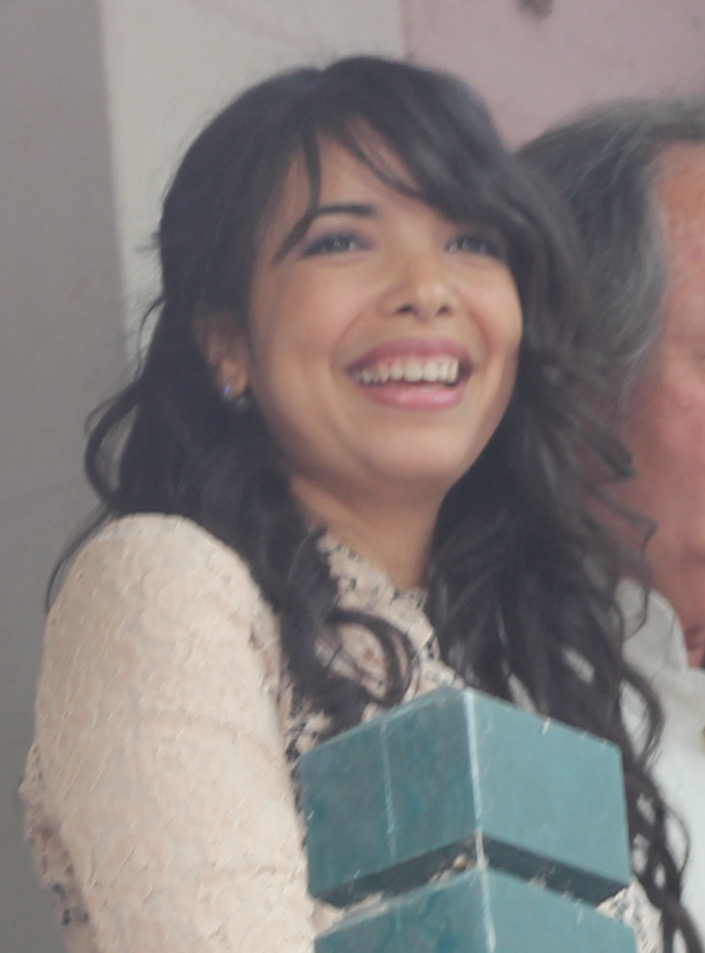
Indila in 2014

In February 2014, Indila released her debut studio album, Mini World, mainly produced by Skalpovich. Two other singles from the album reached the top 20 in the charts in France; "Tourner dans le vide" (English: "Spinning in the Emptiness") reached number 13, and "S.O.S" reached number 8. Mini World was the best-selling album in France at the week of its debut, remaining among the ten best-selling albums through the week of 11 October 2014. A limited-edition CD/DVD version of Mini World was released in November 2014, with two new songs, orchestral versions of "Tourner dans le vide" and "Love Story", an acoustic version of "S.O.S", and video of live performances of several tracks from the album. A second limited-edition release of Mini World in February 2015 contained ten tracks from the original release, the two new songs from the first limited edition, and another new song. Mini World found success both in France, where it was the third-best-selling album of 2014, and outside the country, where it was the best-seller of 2014 in Poland and second-best-seller of 2014 in Belgium.

In October, Indila won the MTV Europe Music Award for Best French Artist. In February 2015, she won Best New Album of the Year award for Mini World, at the 30th Victoires de la Musique. Same year, she was among the ten artists to receive the European Border Breakers Award.

=== 2019–present: "Parle à ta tête" and several collaborations ===
Following a five-year hiatus, Indila teased her then-upcoming single "Parle à ta tête" (English: "Speak to Your Head"), sharing its cover art on 20 August 2019. Produced by Skalpovich, the song was released after three days. On 14 November, its music video was released on her YouTube channel. Following "Parle à ta tête", her second album was to be released in the first quarter of 2020, but this has not materialised by the time of the COVID-19 pandemic. According to Purecharts, delays in the release of the album had also been caused by disputes between Indila's team and her record label In October 2020, French-Israel singer Amir's single "Carrousel", a collaboration with Indila, was released; a music video for the song followed in April 2021. In January 2023, Algerian-Canadian singer Zaho unveiled the track "Roi 2 cœur" on her album Résilience, in duet with Indila. On 26 January 2024, German DJ Bennett released "Dernière Danse (Techno Mix)" to commemorate the 10 year anniversary of "Dernière Danse".

In spring 2025, Indila was reportedly seen filming a music video on the Bir-Hakeim bridge in Paris, wearing a pink dress and accompanied by a white horse, followed by a camera car. In May of the same year, Entrevue reported that Indila is working on her second studio album. According to a source quoted in Le Parisien, she finished recording the album in December 2024, and is set to embark on a large-scale tour with a new artistic team and label. On 22 December 2025, the American rapper Lil Uzi Vert sampled "Love Story" for his single "What You Saying". In 2026, following the public dissolution of her label Island Def Jam France, it was revealed that Indila had moved to Polydor France.

== Artistry ==
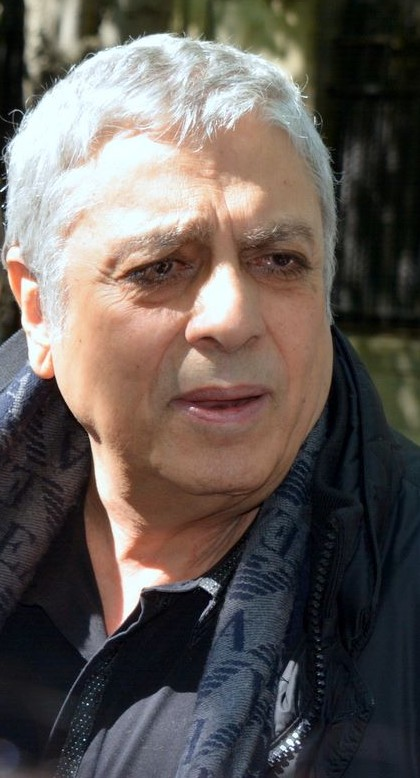
Indila cited Enrico Macias (pictured) as her first influence.

Indila's musical style has been described as world music, incorporating pop elements. Some sources have listed her vocal range as spanning E♭_{3} – F#_{5} and have described her as an alto. She has cited Enrico Macias as her first musical influence, with others influences being Michael Jackson, Ismaël Lo, Buika, Warda, Jacques Brel, Lata Mangeshkar, and Édith Piaf.

== Discography ==
=== Studio albums ===
List of studio albums
Title	Album details	Peak chart positions						Certifications
Title	Album details	FRA	BEL (FL)	BEL (WA)	GER	POL	SWI	Certifications
Mini World	Released: 24 February 2014; Label: Capitol Music France	1	16	1	32	1	11	SNEP: Diamond; BEA: Platinum; ZPAV: Diamond

=== Singles ===
List of singles as lead artist, with selected chart positions and certifications, showing year released and originating album
Title	Year	Peak chart positions										Certifications	Album
Title	Year	FRA	AUT	BEL (FL)	BEL (WA)	GER	POL	SWI	GRE	ISR	TUR	Certifications	Album
"Dernière danse"	2013	2	46	5	2	46	3	15	1	1	1	SNEP: Platinum; BEA: Platinum; BVMI: Gold; RIAA: Gold	Mini World
"Tourner dans le vide"	2014	13	2	18	11	28	78	89	10	96	23		Mini World
"S.O.S"	2014	8	—	3	—	—	6	10	—	—	—		Mini World
"Run Run"	2014	59	—	—	—	—	—	—	—	—	—		Mini World
"Love Story"	2014	57	—	49	—	—	—	—	—	—	—		Mini World
"Parle à ta tête"	2019	— (Note: "Parle à ta tête" did not enter the French singles chart (downloads + streaming), but peaked at number 2 on downloads chart.)	—	—	— (Note: "Parle à ta tête" did not enter the Ultratop 50, but peaked at number 20 on the Walloon Ultratip chart.)	—	—	—	—	—	—	SNEP: Gold	Non-album single
"Dernière danse (Techno Mix)"	2024	—	—	—	—	—	—	—	—	—	—		Non-album single
"—" denotes a recording that did not chart or was not released in that territory.

=== Other charted songs ===
List of songs, with selected chart positions, showing year released and originating album
Title	Year	Peak chart positions	Album
Title	Year	FRA	Album
"Tu ne m'entends pas"	2014	116	Mini World
"Boîte en argent"	2014	121	Mini World
"Mini World"	2014	136	Mini World
"Ego"	2014	149	Mini World
"Comme un bateau"	2014	153	Mini World
"Feuille d'automne"	2014	80	Mini World Limited Edition (Bonus Tracks)
"Ainsi bas la vida"	2014	103	Mini World Limited Edition (Bonus Tracks)

=== As featured artist ===
List of singles as featured artist, with selected chart positions, showing year released and originating album
Title	Year	Peak chart positions			Album
Title	Year	FRA	BEL (WA)	SWI	Album
"Criminel" (TLF featuring Indila)	2010	—	—	—	Renaissance
"Poussière d'empire" (Nessbeal featuring Indila)	2010	—	—	—	NE2S
"Hiro" (Soprano featuring Indila)	2010	26	27	—	La colombe
"Thug Mariage" (Rohff featuring Indila)	2011	—	—	—	La cuenta
"Bye Bye Sonyé" (DJ Abdel featuring Indila)	2011	—	—	—	Evolution 2011
"Dreamin'" (Youssoupha featuring Indila & Skalpovitch)	2012	14	8* (Ultratop)	65	Noir désir
"Garde L'équilibre" (H Magnum featuring Indila)	2015	96	—	—	Gotham City
"Carrousel" (Amir Haddad featuring Indila)	2020	191	—	—	Ressources
"Roi 2 cœur" (Zaho featuring Indila)	2023	104	—	—	Résilience
"*" denotes a single did not appear in the official Belgian Ultratop 50 charts, but rather in the bubbling under Ultratip charts.

=== Other vocals ===
List of other vocals
Title	Artist	Year	Album
"Dans Les Yeux"	Sell One	2006-2007	
"Invitaation"	Vitaa	2009	Celle que je vois
"Trinité"	L'Algérino	2010	Effet miroir
"À L'ancienne"	113	2010	Universel
"Press pause"	OGB	2011	La mémoire
"Yema"	Kayna Samet	2012	A coeur ouvert
"Plus jamais"	Sultan	2012	Des Jours Meilleurs

== Songwriting credits ==
List of songwriting credits
Title	Year	Artist	Ref.
"Poussière d'empire"	2010	Nessbeal	
"J'ai besoin d'y croire" (featuring Awa Imani and Indila)	2010	Admiral T	
"Thug mariage"	2010	Rohff	
"Bye Bye Sonyé"	2011	DJ Abdel	
"Avec toi" (featuring Tunisiano and Indila)	2012	Axel Tony	
"Plus haut"	2012	M. Pokora	
"Plus jamais"	2012	Sultan	
"Dreamin'" (featuring Indila and Skalpovitch)	2012	Youssoupha	
"Ma reine" (featuring Admiral T and Indila)	2013	Axel Tony	
"Baila"	2016	Ishtar	
"Pour toi et moi"	2016	Ishtar	
"Carrousel"	2020	Amir	
