= My Love Story =

My Love Story may refer to:

- My Love Story!!, a Japanese romantic comedy manga series
- My Love Story (2013 film), an Odia-language film
- My Love Story! (2015 film), a 2015 Japanese high school romantic comedy film based on the manga series
- My Love Story (Linda Chung album), 2009
- My Love Story (Toni Gonzaga album), 2015
- My Love Story, a 2001 album by Agnes Chan

== See also ==
- Love Story (disambiguation)
