= Canton of Biarritz =

Coordinates: 43.48°N 1.56°W

The canton of Biarritz is an administrative division of the Pyrénées-Atlantiques department, southwestern France. It was created at the French canton reorganisation which came into effect in March 2015. Its seat is in Biarritz.

It consists of the following communes:

1. Biarritz
