= S.O.S (Indila song) =

2014 song by Indila

- Remix version cover

Single by Indila

from the album Mini World
- Language: French
- Released: 9 June 2014
- Length: 4:48
- Label: Capitol; AZ; Universal
- Songwriters: Adila Sedraïa; Skalpovich
- Producer: Skalpovich

Indila singles chronology
"Tourner dans le vide" (2014)	"S.O.S" (2014)	"Run Run" (2014)

Music video
- "S.O.S" on YouTube

"S.O.S" is a song recorded by French singer-songwriter Indila from the album Mini World. It was released via Capitol Music France, AZ and Universal Music Group. The video clip, which was released on 9 June 2014, was shot in Greece.

== Charts ==
"S.O.S" chart performance
Chart	Peak position
Belgium (Ultratop 50 Wallonia)	23
France (SNEP)	8
Poland (Polish Airplay Top 100)	6
Switzerland (Schweizer Hitparade)	62
