= Biarritz =

City on the Bay of Biscay, France

Biarritz Biarritz / Miarritze (Basque) Biàrritz (Occitan)
- Commune
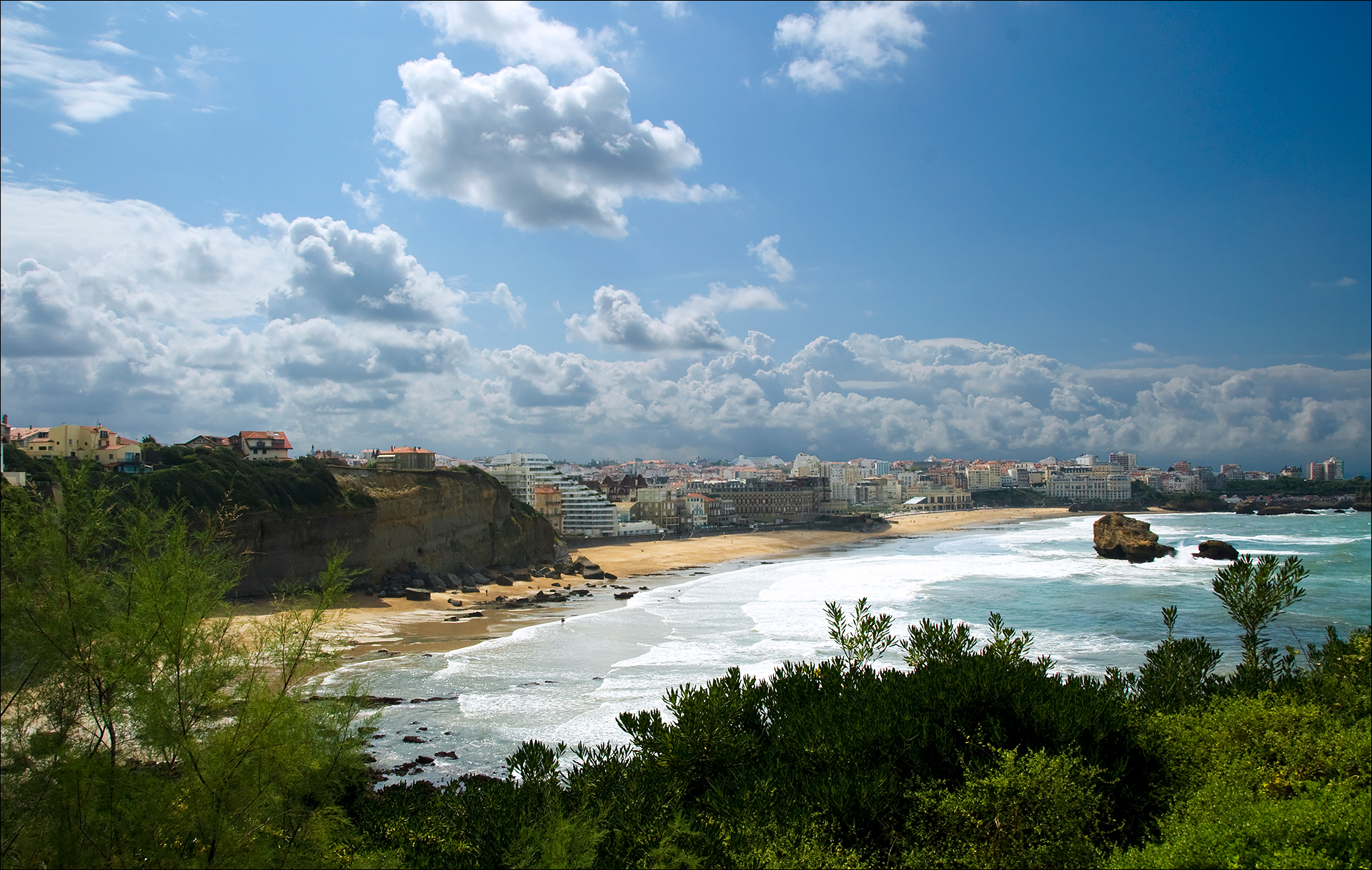
- Beach seen from the Pointe Saint-Martin

- Flag Coat of arms
- Location of Biarritz
- Location within France Location within Nouvelle-Aquitaine
- Coordinates: 43°29′N 1°34′W
- Country: France
- Region: Nouvelle-Aquitaine
- Department: Pyrénées-Atlantiques
- Arrondissement: Bayonne
- Canton: Biarritz
- Intercommunality: CA Pays Basque

Government
  - Mayor (2026–32): Serge Blanco
- Area^{1}: 11.66 km^{2} (4.50 sq mi)
- Highest elevation: 85 m (279 ft)
- Lowest elevation: 0 m (0 ft)
- Population (2023): 26,206
  - Density: 2,248/km^{2} (5,821/sq mi)
- Time zone: UTC+01:00 (CET)
  - Summer (DST): UTC+02:00 (CEST)
- INSEE/Postal code: 64122 /64200
- ^{1} French Land Register data, which excludes lakes, ponds, glaciers > 1 km^{2} (0.386 sq mi or 247 acres) and river estuaries.

Biarritz (UK: /bɪəˈrɪts, ˈbɪərɪts/ beer-ITS, BEER-its, US: /ˌbiːəˈrɪts, ˈbiːərɪts/ BEE-ə-RITS, -rits, French: [bjaʁits], Basque: [bi.arits̻]; also spelled Miarritze [mi.arits̻e]; Occitan: Biàrritz [ˈbjarits]) is a French commune on the Bay of Biscay, on the Atlantic coast in the Pyrénées-Atlantiques department in the French Basque Country in southwestern France. It is located 35 kilometres (22 mi) from the border with Spain. It is a luxurious seaside tourist destination known for the Hôtel du Palais (originally built for the Empress Eugénie c. 1855), its seafront casinos, and its surfing culture.

== Etymology ==
In Basque, its name is Biarritz or Miarritze. Its current Gascon name is Biàrrits. The name for an inhabitant of the city is Biarrot in French and Biarriztar or Miarriztar in Basque. The suffix -itz, as in Isturitz, is a Basque locative.

Biarritz appears as Bearids and Bearriz in 1150, Beiarridz in 1165, Bearriz and Beariz in 1170, Bearidz (1186), Bearriz and Beariz (12th century), lo port de Beiarriz and Bearridz in 1261 (cartulaire de Bayonne). Other forms include Beiarid (1199), Bearritz (1249), Beiarriz and Beiarrids (1261), Bearridz (1281), Bearrits (1338), (rôles gascons), Bearritz (1498, chapitre de Bayonne), Sanctus Martinus de Biarriz (1689, collations du diocèse de Bayonne, Mearritcen (1712), Biarrits (1863, Dictionnaire topographique Béarn-Pays basque), as well as Biarritze and Miarritze.

== History ==
=== Prehistory ===
Analysis of stones from the Middle Paleolithic shows that the Biarritz area was inhabited at that time.

=== Middle Ages ===
The oldest mention of the city appears in a cartulary, Bayonne's Golden book, from 1186, where it is named Bearids; some years later the name used was Beiarrids. The first urban development was to the south, at the top, and at the interior. Today this is near the location of the église Saint-Martin, the oldest church in Biarritz.

In 1152, Eleanor of Aquitaine married Henry II of England, who became suzerain of the Duchy of Aquitaine. Prince Edward, the oldest son of Henry III of England, was invested with the duchy and betrothed to Eleanor of Castile, who brought him rights over Gascony.

Two population centers are attested in the Middle Ages. On the one hand, the église Saint-Martin was active in the neighborhoods in the territory's interior, which were:

- Gardague (mentioned in 1233)
- Legure (lac Mouriscot)
- Larrepunte and the domains of Silloete-de-Bas and Silloete-de-Haut
- Arretegui
- Chabiague
- Castera
- Suhy
- Itçar (mentioned in 1342)
- Monsegur (1335)
- Martin Petit
- Chohy
- Maron
- Catalina
- Harausta (which would become La Négresse).

On the other hand, the château of Belay (first mentioned in 1342), also called château de Ferragus, protected the coast and the current Port-Vieux (old port), while religious life and community assemblies took place at Notre-Dame-de-Pitié (a chapel mentioned in 1498), dominating the Port-des-Pêcheurs, or fishing port.

A document dated May 26, 1342, attested to this fishing activity, authorising les Biarrots to "(…) remit to Bayonne all the fresh fish that we and succeeding inhabitants of Biarritz can fish from the salt sea".

Construction of the château de Ferragus was initiated by the English, on the foundations of a Roman work, at the summit of the promontory overlooking the sea, named Atalaye, used as a whale-observation post. This château had a double crenulated wall two meters thick, a drawbridge and four towers. Mentions of this château occur as late as 1603, in the letters patent of Henry IV. One tower remained as of 1739 when a daymark was established there, called de la Haille, then de la Humade. The tower disappeared in 1856.

=== Whaling ===
Most of the documents, records and official agreements gathered in the archives from Biarritz mention whaling. This was the principal local industry. Consequently, the town's coat of arms features the image of a whale below a rowing boat manned by five sailors wearing berets, one of whom is preparing to throw a harpoon. It bears the inscription: Aura, sidus, mare, adjuvant me (The air, the stars and the seas are helping me).

Biarritz has long made its living from the sea. After the 7th century, Biarritz had many confrontations with Bayonne, with the Kingdom of England – Lapurdi was under English control – and with the Bishop of Bayonne. Almost all of the disputes were about whale hunting. In 1284, the town's right to hunt whales was reinstated by the authorities of Lapurdi and the Duchy of Aquitaine.

During the Middle Ages and early modern period, a watchtower looked down over the sea at Biarritz, from "La Humade", waiting for the sight of a whale. Whenever those keeping watch saw a whale, they would burn wet straw to create a large amount of smoke and thus communicate the news to their fellow countrymen. Eventually, however, the tower disappeared.

In the 16th century, as a consequence of hunting in the area, or for other reasons, the whales migrated elsewhere. Whale hunters from Lapurdi, therefore, crossed the Atlantic Ocean in pursuit of them and spent over a century in the Labrador Peninsula and on Newfoundland. Later, instead of hunting whales, they started to fish for cod in Newfoundland. A century later, due to the ban on fishing off the coasts of North America and the steely competence of English and Dutch fishermen, the number of fishing boats from Biarritz diminished, and nowadays the Biarritz fishing industry in these areas has come to an end.

The first lighthouse in the village was built in 1650.

=== 18th century ===
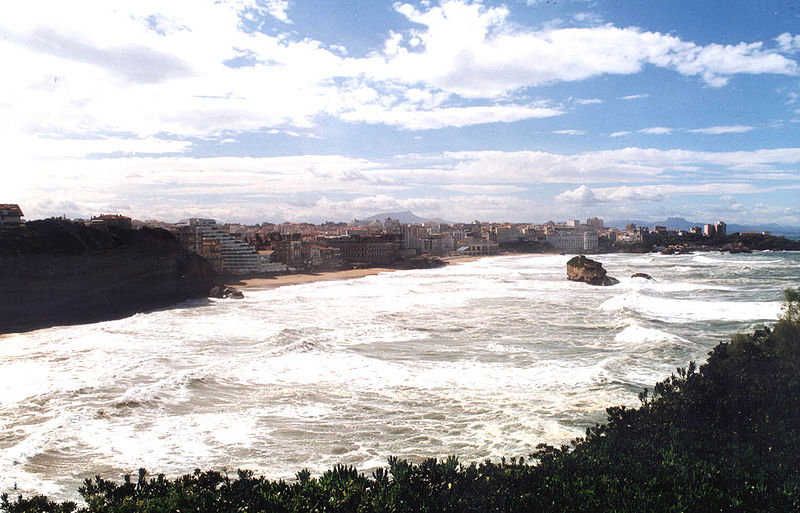
The Cape of Biarritz.

Biarritz was an independent municipality until 1784 with a clergyman and four aldermen, and the city was governed by twelve deputies. Deputies were democratically chosen: there were four districts (Portua, Bustingorri, Hurlaga and Alto), and three deputies had to be chosen from each of them. However, deputies were chosen by the abbot and aldermen. Since there was no Town Hall, they gathered in a ward near the church. As there was not enough space for all in attendance, they held their meetings in the cemetery. Biarritz had around 1,700 citizens at this time.

In the 18th century, doctors claimed that the ocean at Biarritz had therapeutic properties, inspiring patients to make pilgrimages to the beach for alleged cures for their ailments. The city began to transition into a world-famous spa town in the mid-1700s.

=== 19th century ===
From 1784 onwards, after the French Revolution, bathing in the sea was no longer reserved for the mentally ill; sea-baths became fashionable. In 1808, Napoleon himself broke with prejudices and bathed in the Basque Country's coastal waters. In 1840, the Municipality of Biarritz started an initiative to attract tourists to the seaside.

Victor Hugo, who visited in 1843, wrote glowingly of Biarritz in his book Alpes et Pyrénées:

I have not met in the world any place more pleasant and perfect than Biarritz. I have never seen the old Neptune throwing joy and glory with such a force in the old Cybele. All this coast is full of humming. Gascony's sea grinds, scratches, and stretches on the reefs its never-ending whisper. Friendly population and white cheerful houses, large dunes, fine sand, great caves and proud sea, Biarritz is amazing. My only fear is Biarritz becoming fashionable. Whether this happens, the wild village, rural and still honest Biarritz, will be money-hungry. Biarritz will put poplars in the hills, railings in the dunes, kiosks in the rocks, seats in the caves, trousers worn on tourists.

In the end, Hugo's prophecy ended up being fulfilled. Biarritz planted poplars, tamarinds, hydrangeas, roses and pittosporums on the slopes and the hills, set railings on the dunes, covered moats with elegant stairs and polluted with land speculation and hunger for money.

Tourists have long been drawn to Biarritz's coast, from the beach at the limit of Bidarte (Plage des Basques), to the cape of Saint Martin. There a 44 metres (144 feet) tall white lighthouse can be found, constructed in 1834 to replace the one Louis XIV had ordered built. Various hotels appeared, as did a municipal casino, the Belleuve club, the casino, the thalassotherapy house, and wonderful luxury houses. Luxurious branches of shops from London and Paris were also set up, and 36 small newspapers were published.

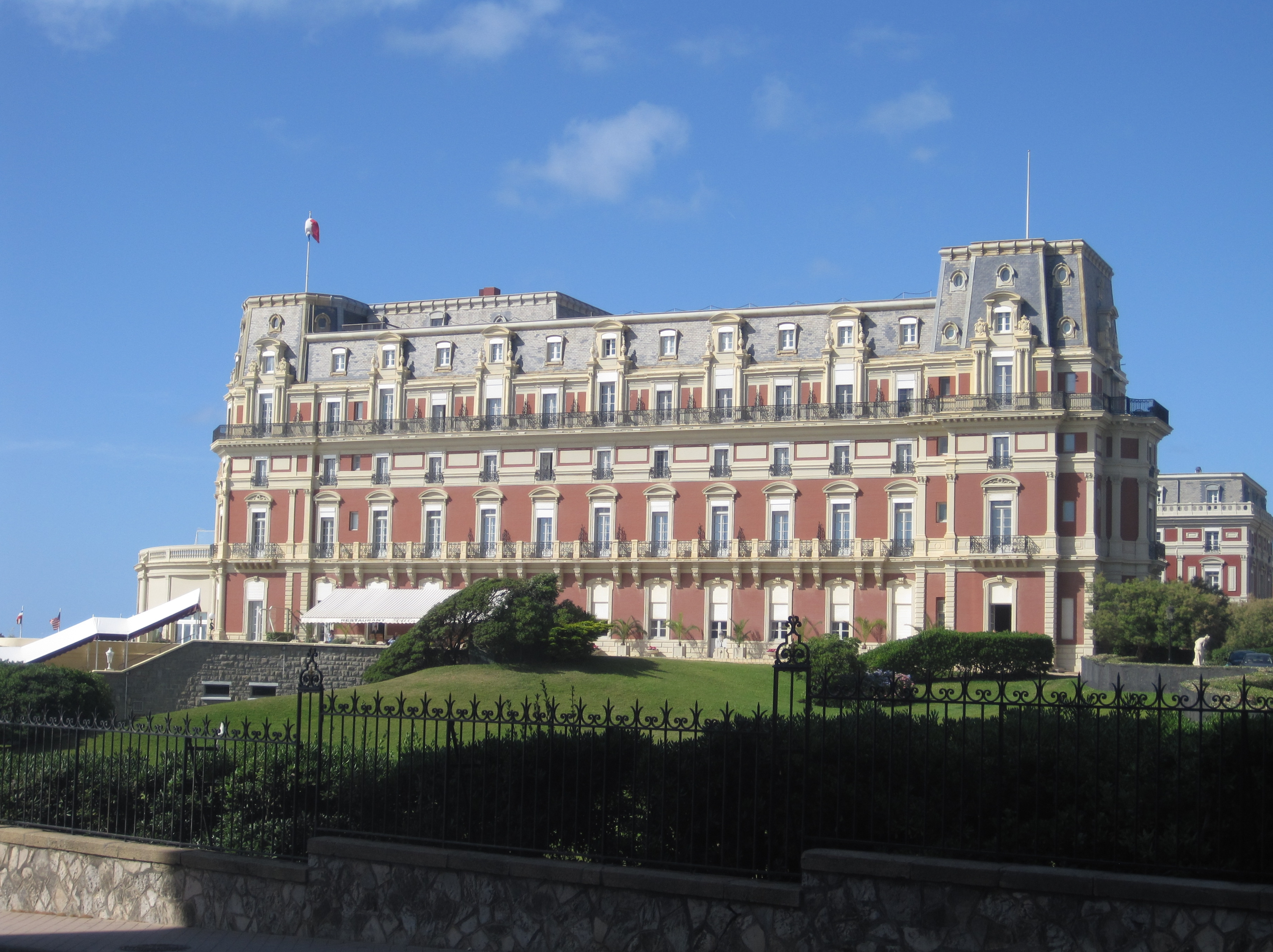
Hôtel du Palais, Biarritz, France (2)

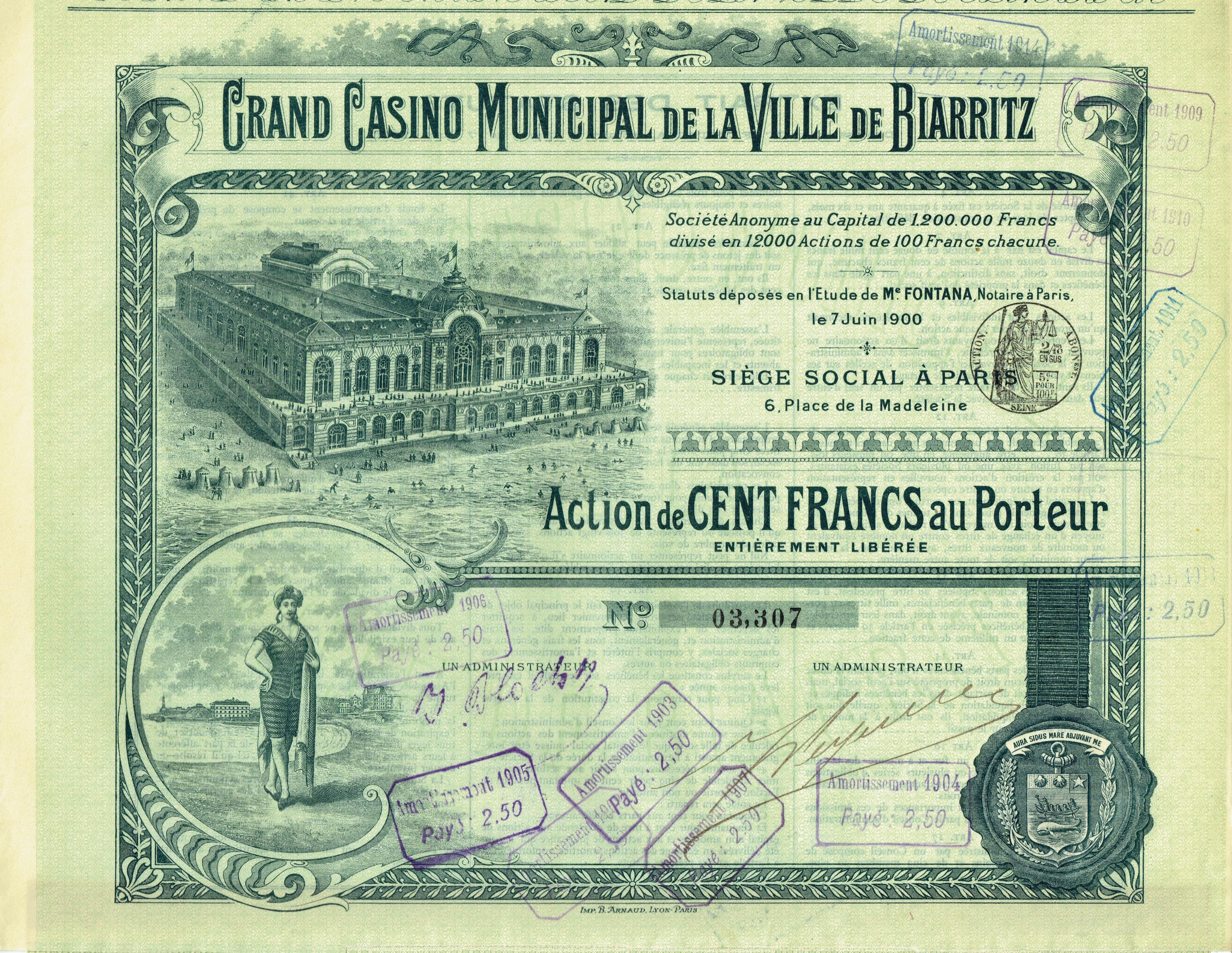
Share of the Grand Casino Municipal de la Ville de Biarritz S. A., issued 1900

Biarritz gained renown in 1854 when Empress Eugenie (the wife of Napoleon III) built a palace on the beach (now the Hôtel du Palais). European royalty, including British monarchs Queen Victoria and King Edward VII (who caused a minor scandal when he called H. H. Asquith to kiss hands at Biarritz in 1908 rather than return to London for the ceremony), and the Spanish king Alfonso XIII, were frequent visitors.

Biarritz's casino (opened 10 August 1901) and beaches make the town a notable tourist centre for Europeans and East Coast North Americans.

Opened in June 1893, Biarritz's salt baths were designed and built by the architect Lagarde. Sourced from the gatzagas of Beskoitz and passing through a 20-kilometre (12 mi) pipe, water ten times saltier than the sea was used. The baths were closed in 1953 and demolished in 1968.

The presence of the French Republic's authorities and the launch of the Paris–Hendaye train led Biarritz to become one of the most outstanding tourist areas in Europe. The queen of the beaches became the beach of the kings and queens: Oscar II of Sweden, Leopold of Belgium, empress of Russia Maria Feodorovna, mother of Nicholas II of Russia, Empress Elisabeth of Austria, Natalie of Serbia and her son Alexander I of Serbia, George V from Britain, Edward VII and Britain's Queen Victoria, Alfonso XIII of Spain, as well aristocrats, rich people and actors from Europe and South America. In the summer, people of high status gathered in Biarritz. The population thereby increased considerably, from 5,000 to 18,000. At the end of the 19th century, 50,000 vacationers were gathering in Biarritz.

=== Belle Époque ===
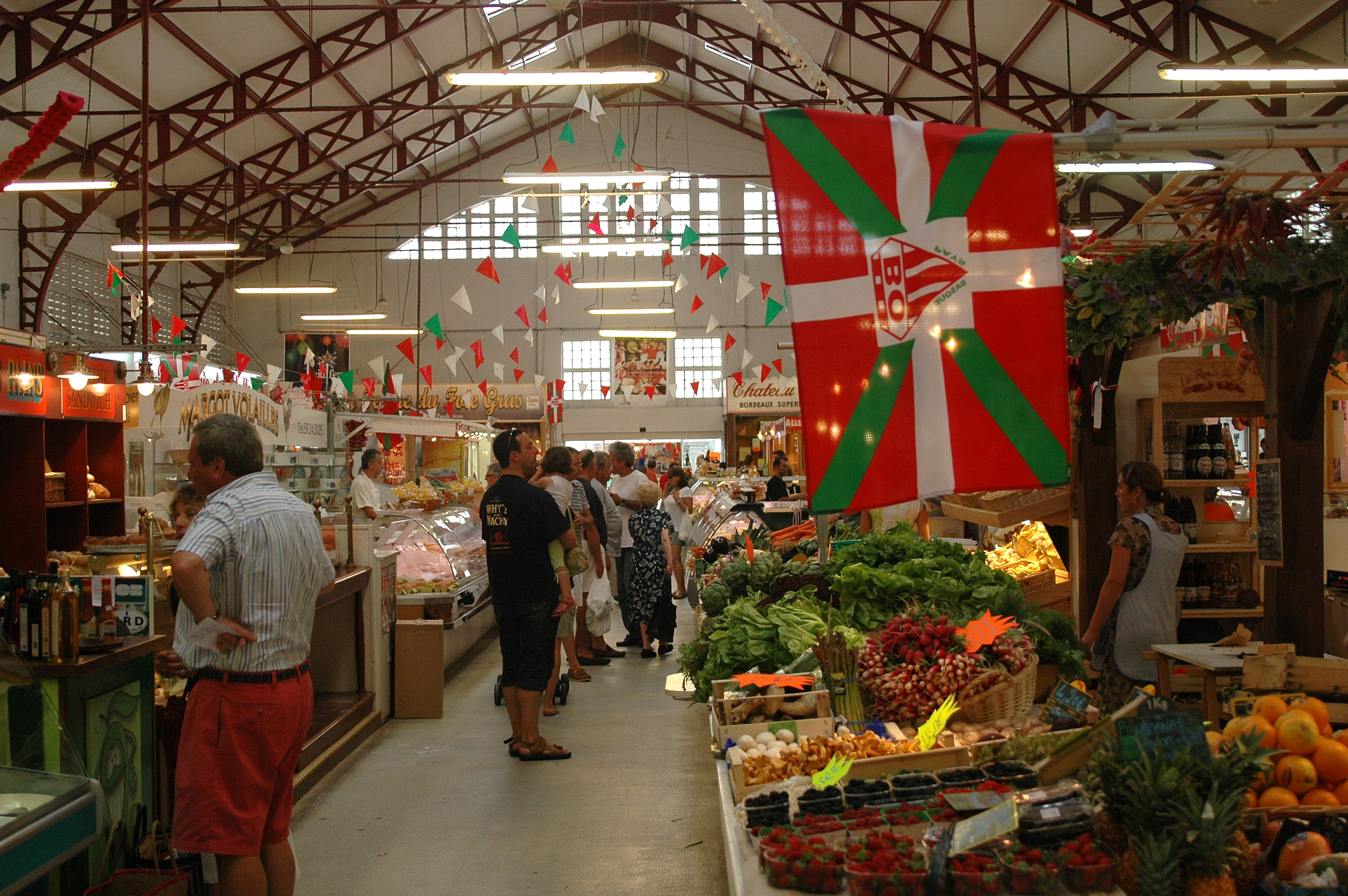
Biarritz market

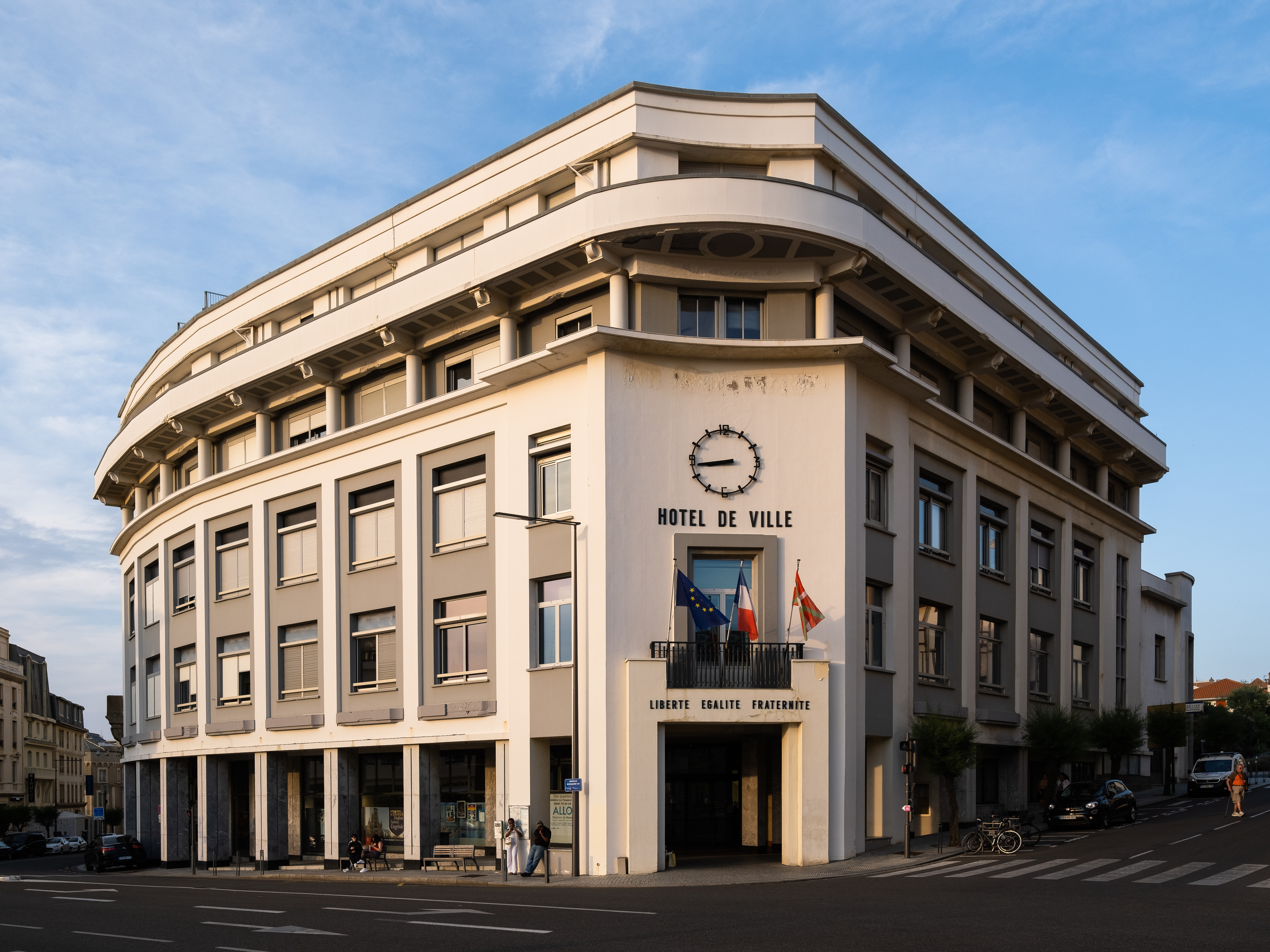
The Hôtel de Ville

During the Belle Époque of European peace and prosperity, in 1894, a department store called Biarritz Bonheur was created. It was enlarged twice (in 1911 and 1926). It became the temple of luxury and fashion. By the start of the 20th century, most of its workers spoke English. The Hôtel de Ville, which was commissioned as a department store, was completed in 1929.

=== After World War II ===
At the end of World War II in Europe, the U.S. Army's Information and Educational Branch was ordered to establish an overseas university campus for demobilized American servicemen and women in the French resort town of Biarritz. Under General Samuel L. McCroskey, the hotels and casinos of Biarritz were converted into quarters, labs, and class spaces for U.S. service personnel. The university opened on 10 August 1945 and about 10,000 students attended an eight-week term. This campus was set up to provide a transition between army life and subsequent attendance at a university in the US, so students attended for just one term. After three successful terms, the G.I. University closed in March 1946 (see G. I. American Universities).

=== The arrival of surfing in Europe ===
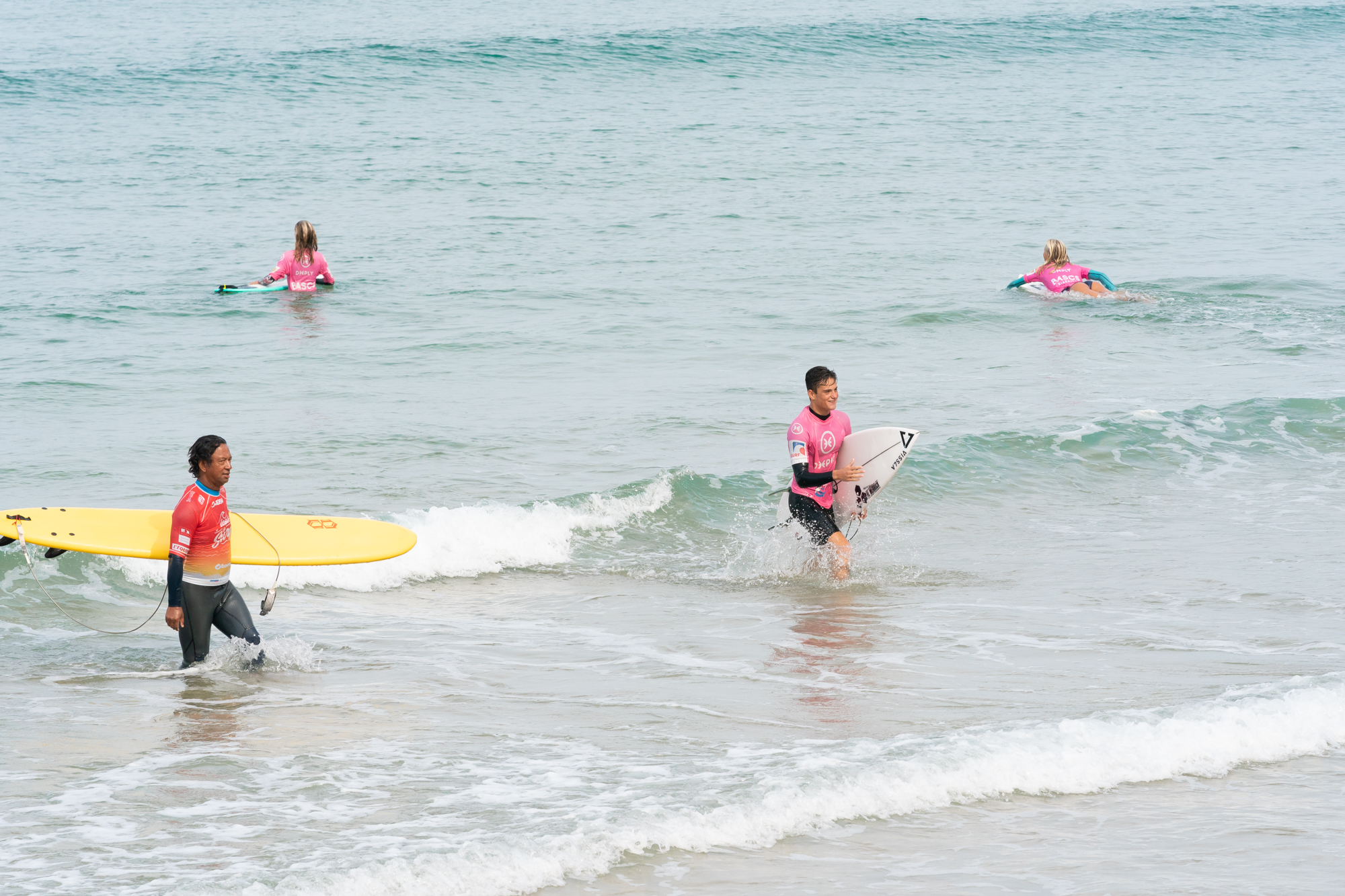
Surfers participate in a demonstration for the 2019 G7 Summit

In 1957, American film director Peter Viertel was in Biarritz with his British wife, actress Deborah Kerr, working on the film The Sun Also Rises. One of his Californian friends came for a visit and his use of a surfboard off Biarritz is recognized as the first time surfing was practised in Europe. Biarritz eventually became one of the most popular European spots for surfers from around the world, developing a nightlife and surfing-based culture.

== Geography ==
Biarritz is located in the Pyrénées-Atlantiques department in the Nouvelle-Aquitaine region. It is part of the arrondissement of Bayonne, adjacent to Bayonne and Anglet and 35 kilometres (22 mi) from the border with Spain. The city is also in the traditional province of Labourd in the French Basque Country.

=== Climate ===
Biarritz has a temperate oceanic climate, Cfb in the Köppen climate classification. It is one of the wettest cities in Metropolitan France.

Comparison of local Meteorological data with other cities in France
Town	Sunshine (hours/yr)	Rain (mm/yr)	Snow (days/yr)	Storm (days/yr)	Fog (days/yr)
National average	1,973	770	14	22	40
Biarritz	1,920	1,449.8	2.2	35.5	28.5
Paris	1,661	637	12	18	10
Nice	2,724	767	1	29	1
Strasbourg	1,693	665	29	29	56
Brest	1,605	1,211	7	12	75

Climate data for Biarritz - Pays Basque (BIQ), elevation: 71 m (233 ft) (1991-2020 normals, extremes 1956-present)
Month	Jan	Feb	Mar	Apr	May	Jun	Jul	Aug	Sep	Oct	Nov	Dec	Year
Record high °C (°F)	24.1 (75.4)	28.9 (84.0)	29.7 (85.5)	32.1 (89.8)	34.8 (94.6)	42.9 (109.2)	40.1 (104.2)	40.6 (105.1)	38.7 (101.7)	33.4 (92.1)	27.8 (82.0)	25.1 (77.2)	42.9 (109.2)
Mean daily maximum °C (°F)	12.2 (54.0)	12.8 (55.0)	15.2 (59.4)	16.8 (62.2)	19.9 (67.8)	22.5 (72.5)	24.2 (75.6)	25.1 (77.2)	23.3 (73.9)	20.2 (68.4)	15.4 (59.7)	12.9 (55.2)	18.4 (65.1)
Daily mean °C (°F)	8.6 (47.5)	8.9 (48.0)	11.2 (52.2)	12.8 (55.0)	15.9 (60.6)	18.7 (65.7)	20.6 (69.1)	21.2 (70.2)	18.9 (66.0)	16.1 (61.0)	11.6 (52.9)	9.3 (48.7)	14.5 (58.1)
Mean daily minimum °C (°F)	5.0 (41.0)	4.9 (40.8)	7.1 (44.8)	8.8 (47.8)	11.9 (53.4)	14.9 (58.8)	16.9 (62.4)	17.2 (63.0)	14.5 (58.1)	11.9 (53.4)	7.9 (46.2)	5.7 (42.3)	10.6 (51.1)
Record low °C (°F)	−12.7 (9.1)	−11.5 (11.3)	−7.2 (19.0)	−1.3 (29.7)	3.3 (37.9)	5.3 (41.5)	9.2 (48.6)	8.6 (47.5)	5.3 (41.5)	−0.6 (30.9)	−5.7 (21.7)	−8.9 (16.0)	−12.7 (9.1)
Average precipitation mm (inches)	139.6 (5.50)	110.4 (4.35)	102.8 (4.05)	117.7 (4.63)	116.1 (4.57)	99.2 (3.91)	77.3 (3.04)	87.5 (3.44)	118.2 (4.65)	147.3 (5.80)	206.9 (8.15)	150.6 (5.93)	1,473.6 (58.02)
Average precipitation days (≥ 1.0 mm)	13.7	12.0	11.9	13.3	12.5	10.1	9.4	9.2	10.2	12.1	13.8	12.9	141.1
Average relative humidity (%)	79	76	75	76	78	80	80	79	79	78	80	79	78
Average dew point °C (°F)	5 (41)	5 (41)	6 (43)	8 (46)	11 (52)	15 (59)	16 (61)	17 (63)	14 (57)	12 (54)	8 (46)	6 (43)	10 (51)
Mean monthly sunshine hours	95.7	115.2	163.3	170.7	196.7	206.3	218.5	214.3	199.2	145.4	103.4	91.8	1,920.6
Source 1: Meteociel
Source 2: Time and Date

=== Gallery ===
View of Biarritz from the lighthouse

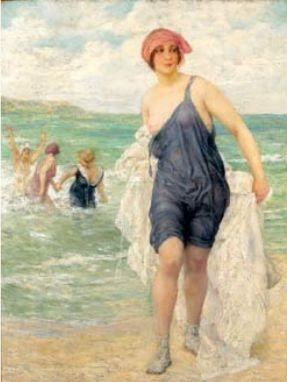
Les baigneuses à Biarritz, by Édouard François Zier

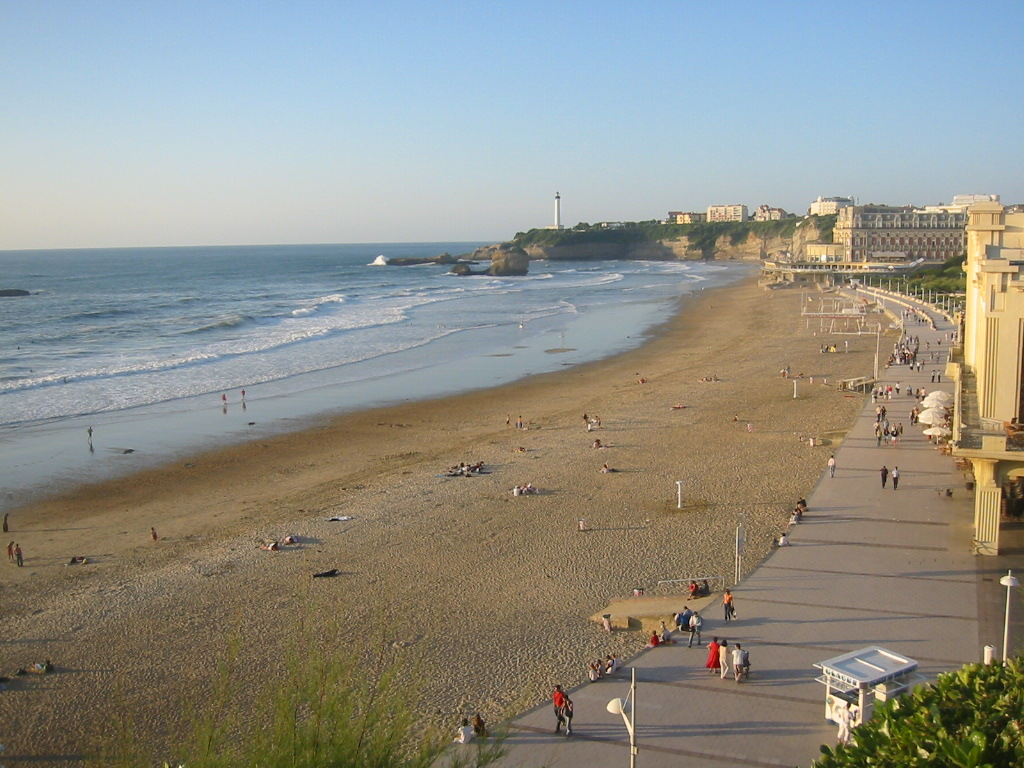
La Grande Plage, the town's largest beach.

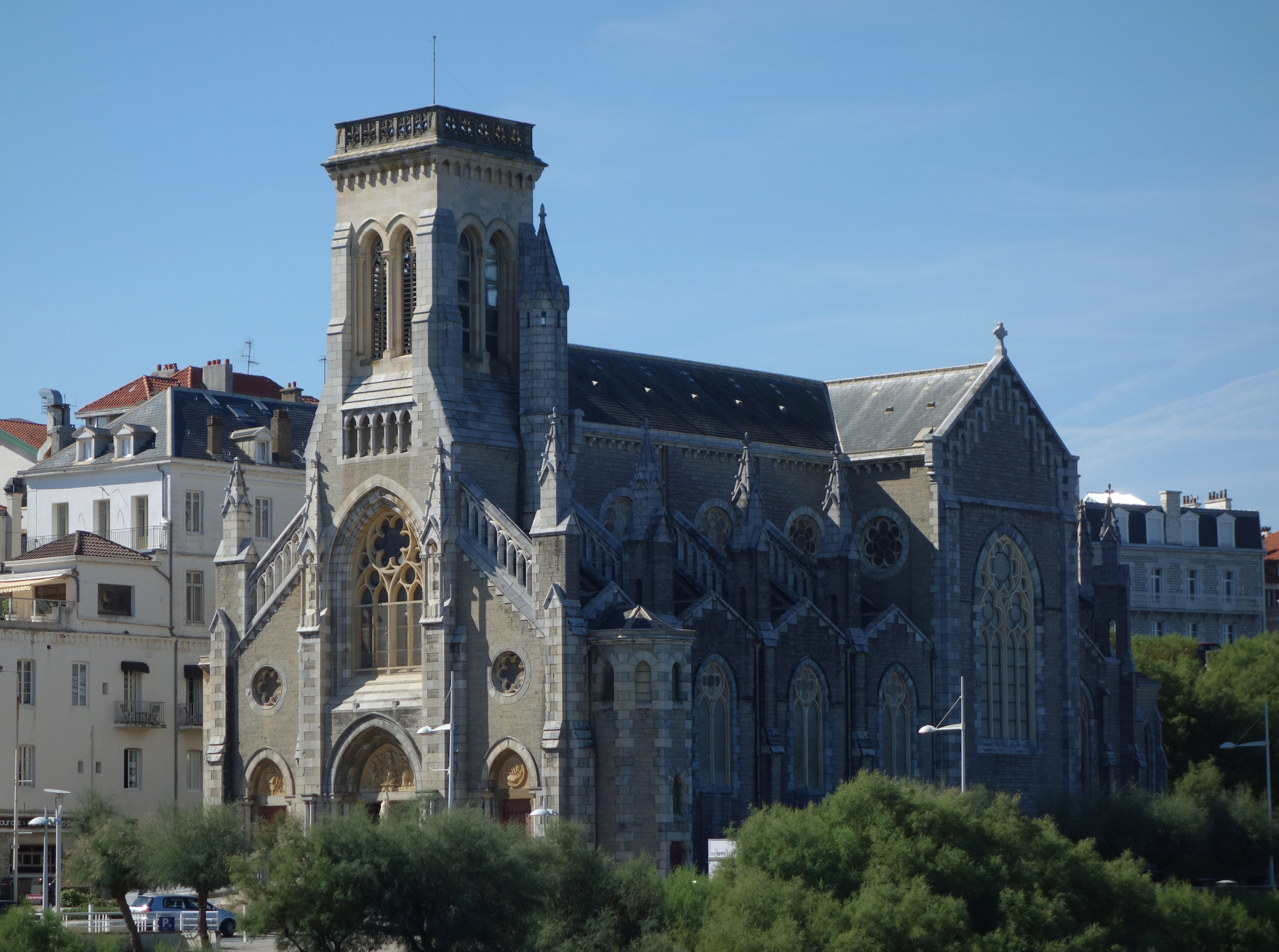
Sainte-Eugénie church.

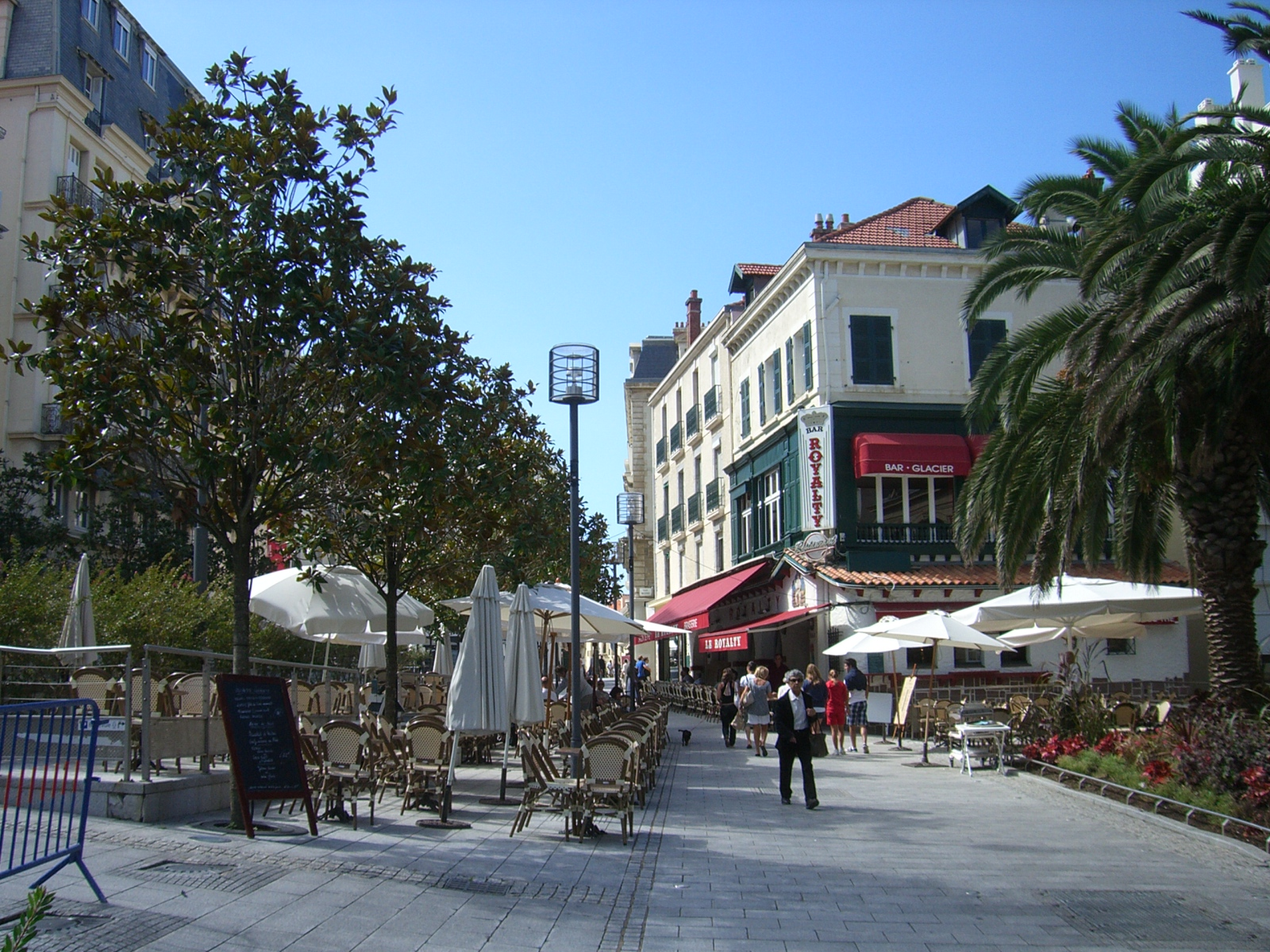
Outdoor cafés.

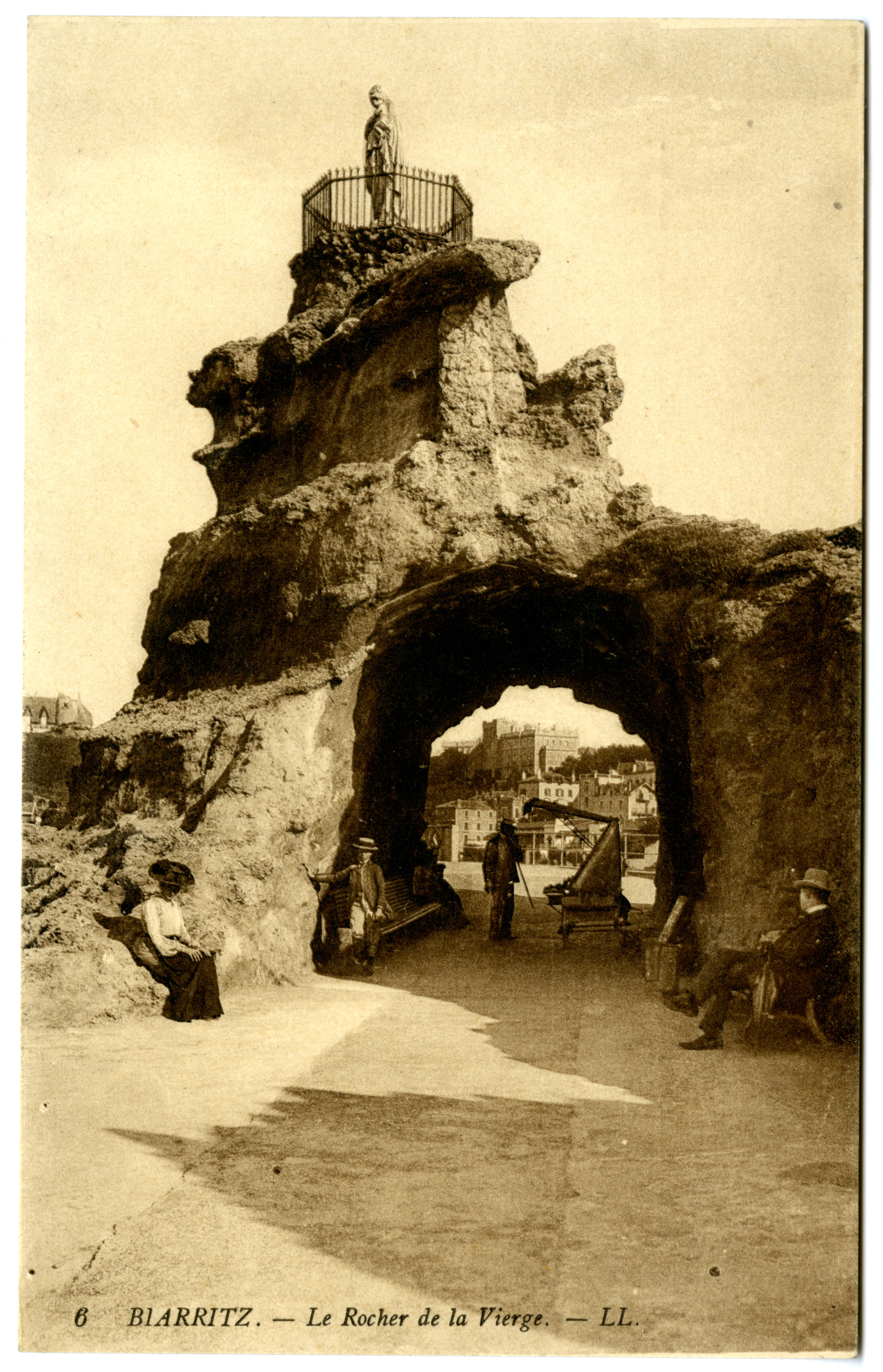
Notre Dame du Rocher.

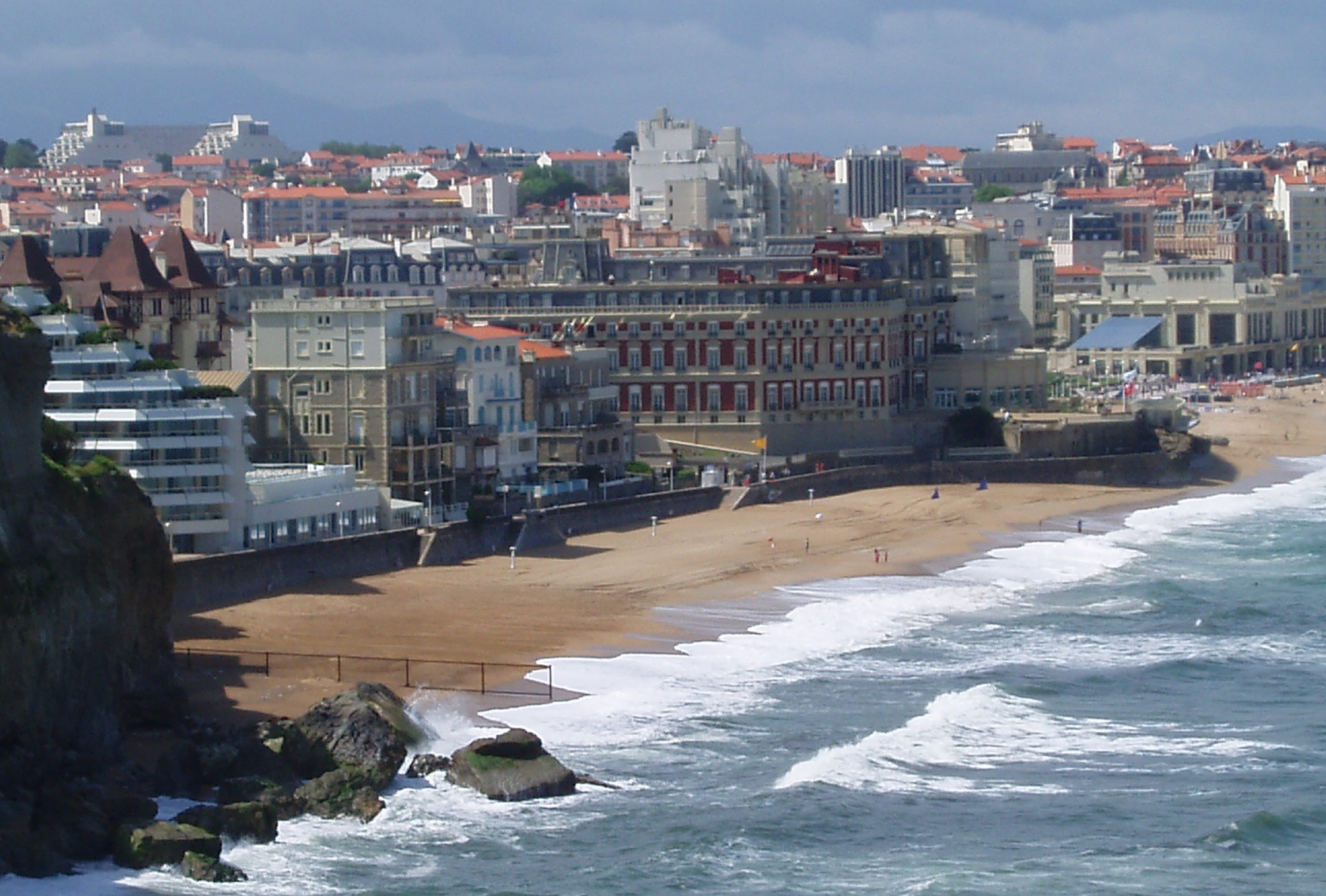
Plage Miramar

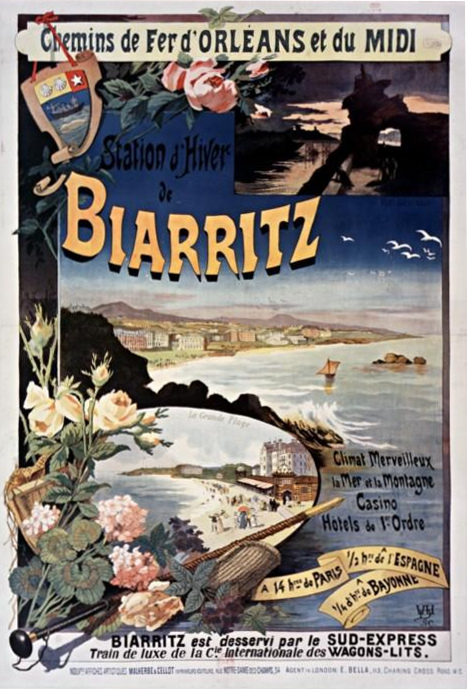
Railway poster

== Main sights ==
- The Asiatica Museum houses a significant collection of Asian art primarily from India, Nepal, Tibet, and China.
- The Museum of the Sea has 24 aquariums containing sharks and seals.
- The Museum of the Ocean and Surf.
- The Historical Museum of Biarritz, housed in the deconsecrated Anglican Church, St Andrew's.
- The annual Biarritz Surf Festival, founded in 1993 at the Côte des Basques, is one of the premier surf events in Europe and longboarding events in the world.
- The église Saint-Martin de Biarritz (Saint Martin's Church), constructed in the 12th century, restored in the mid-16th century.
- The église russe de Biarritz, a Russian Orthodox built in the 19th century for visiting Russian aristocrats, with a famous blue dome.
- The Chapelle impériale, built for Empress Eugenie, has an intricately decorated roof interior and elegant wall tiling. She also had a palace built on the beach, which is now the Hôtel du Palais.
- The Museum of Chocolate explains the history and manufacture of chocolate.
- Two large casinos, the Barrière and the Bellevue, sit on the waterfront near the Grande Plage.

Cliffs and lookouts lie to the west of the main beach.

== Politics ==
=== Mayors ===
Mandate	Name
1788–1789	Pierre Moussempès
1813–1814	Pierre Moussempès
1864–1881	Pierre-Paul Jaulerry
1881–1884	Alcide Augey
1884–1888	Alexandre Larralde-Diustegi
1888–1895	Alcide Augey
1895–1904	Félix Moureu
1904–1919	Pierre Forsans
1919–1929	Joseph Petit
1929–1941	Ferdinand Hirigoien
1941–1944	Henri Cazalis
1945–1977	Guy Petit
1977–1991	Bernard Marie
1991–2014	Didier Borotra
2014–2020	Michel Veunac
2020–2026	Maïder Arosteguy

== Demography ==
Historical population

Year	Pop.	±% p.a.
1793	929	—
1800	1,171	+3.36%
1806	1,188	+0.24%
1821	1,082	−0.62%
1831	1,495	+3.29%
1836	1,705	+2.66%
1841	1,892	+2.10%
1846	1,993	+1.05%
1851	2,048	+0.55%
1856	2,110	+0.60%
1861	2,771	+5.60%
1866	3,652	+5.68%
1872	4,659	+4.14%
1876	5,507	+4.27%
1881	8,527	+9.14%
1886	8,444	−0.20%
1891	9,177	+1.68%
1896	11,869	+5.28%
1901	12,812	+1.54%

Year	Pop.	±% p.a.
1906	15,093	+3.33%
1911	18,260	+3.88%
1921	18,353	+0.05%
1926	20,776	+2.51%
1931	22,955	+2.01%
1936	20,691	−2.06%
1946	22,022	+0.63%
1954	22,922	+0.50%
1962	25,231	+1.21%
1968	26,750	+0.98%
1975	27,595	+0.45%
1982	26,598	−0.52%
1990	28,742	+0.97%
1999	30,055	+0.50%
2007	26,828	−1.41%
2012	25,330	−1.14%
2017	25,404	+0.06%
2023	26,206	+0.52%

Source: EHESS and INSEE

== Economy ==
Although Biarritz's economy was previously based on fishing, it now has a modern economy due to the metropolitan location of Bayonne-Anglet-Biarritz. Together with Bayonne and Anglet, Biarritz takes part in the management of the BAB Airport. The most important economic activities are:

- Spa tourism
- Sport (golf, surfing and rugby)
- Thalassotherapy
- Industry. The most important industries are the following:
  - Atlantica-Séguier, French publishing house
  - Dassault Aviation, manufacturer of fuselages for Falcon planes.

== Culture ==
=== Languages ===
As in the cases of Anglet and Bayonne, also located in the approximate cultural border between Gascony and the Basque Country, it is uncertain if the historic language of Biarritz was Basque or Gascon.

According to the book Atlas Linguistique de Gascogne, Biarritz is considered a Gascon town. However, in 1863, Louis Lucien Bonaparte located the northern frontier of Basque in Biarritz, and in some neighborhoods it was without any doubt the most used language. However, over the course of the 20th century, French became the main language. Beginning in the 1990s, the municipal government of Biarritz has promoted Basque language and culture. At the same time, Gascon has been promoted by various private institutions, for instance the Gascon cultural association, Ací Gasconha. [19]

=== Museums ===
- Sea Museum. Constructed in 1993 in the rock of Atalaia, it is an Art Déco building. It has a huge collection of sea animals and birds.
- Museum of Chocolate
- Asiatica, museum of the Eastern art. Art from India, Tibet, Nepal and China can be found
- Museum of the History of Biarritz. Located in the Anglican Church of Saint Andrew since the 1980s
- Cité de l'Ocean et du Surf, opened in 2011.

=== Music and dance ===
The city has the Ballet of Biarritz, an important centre of French dance. It is also home to the cultural centre Atabal and the chorus Oldarra, created in 1946.

=== Theatre ===
The emperor Napoleon III and Eugénie de Montijo brought the sea-theater on the Old Port neighborhood into fashion. Nowadays, the light works made by Pierre Bideau can be seen at night on the cliff.

=== Cinema ===
Two film festivals of cinema are celebrated in Biarritz:

- Festival of Latin American Cinema of Biarritz.
- International Festival of Audio-Visual Programs (FIPA)

=== Civil buildings ===
- Hôtel du Palais or Eugénie House
- Building of the Hotel of England, built in 1870 by Louis Moussempés
- Natasha House
- Sacchino or Castel Biarritz, house of Natalia of Serbia
- Plaza Hotel
- Casino of Biarritz, in Art Deco style
- Lighthouse, built in 1834 in Saint Martin cape
- Villa Black or Black House, built by Alphonse Bertrand between 1880 and 1895
- Goëland House, which since 2003 has been a hotel
- Françon Castle
- Boulard Castle
- Pavilion of England
- Fishermen House, in the port
- The former health resort in the Old Port
- Miremont sweet shop

=== Religious buildings ===
- Chapelle impériale de Biarritz
- Église Saint-Martin de Biarritz
- Église Sainte-Eugénie de Biarritz, built between 1898 and 1903
- Église russe de Biarritz
- Synagogue de Biarritz
- Mosquée de Bayonne

=== Rocks ===
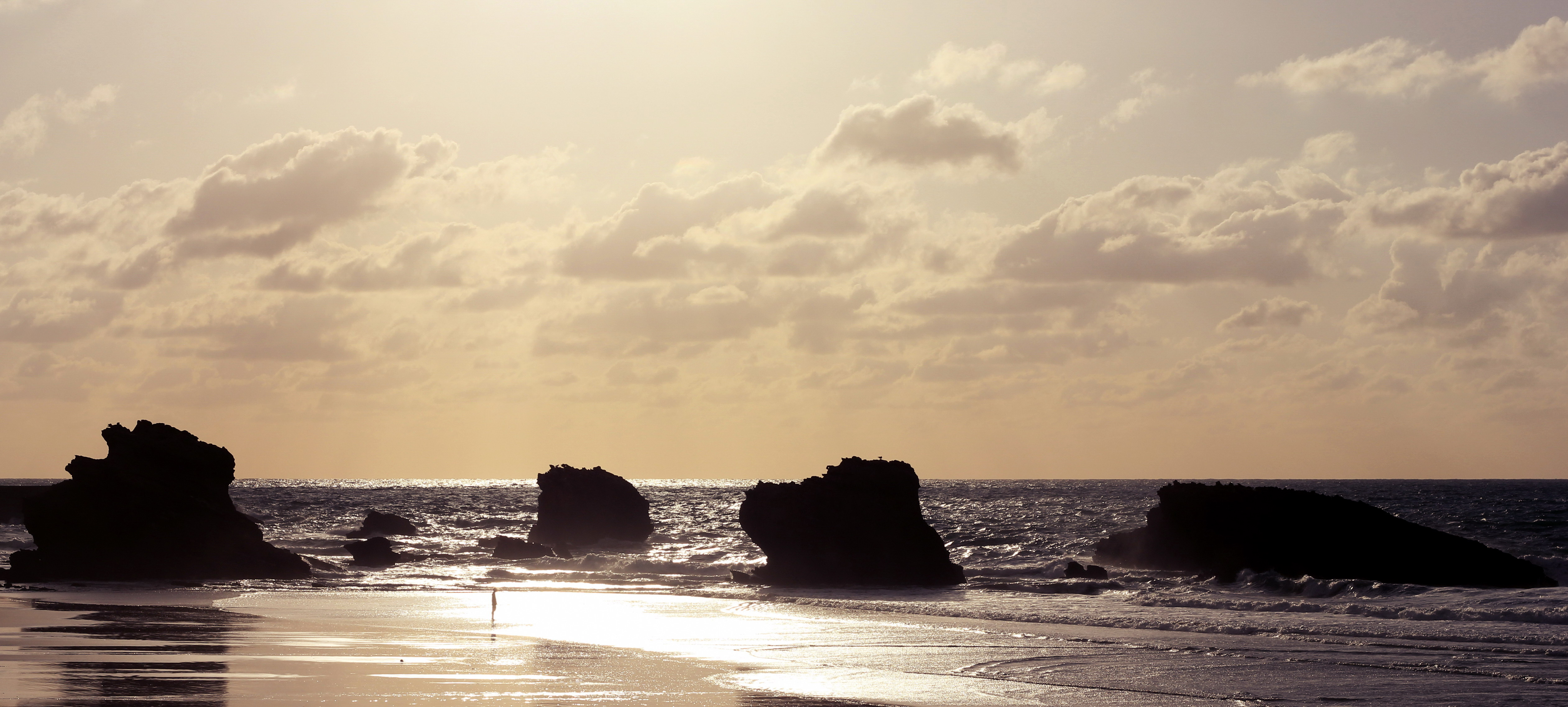
Biarritz rocks

- The Rocks of Biarritz are an important part of the city's attractions. Every year they erode by an estimated 70 centimeters.

=== Beaches ===
- Biarritz has six beaches: Miramar, Big, Old Port, The Basque Coast, Marbella and Milady

=== Gardens and Parks ===
- Biarritz has 120 hectares of parks and two recreational lakes (Marion and Muriskot)
- In the city centre there are three gardens: the Pierre Forsans public garden (across from the Gare du Midi performance centre) and two others nearby (Lahouze Garden and Parc Mazon). The city center also includes a number of open-air sports fields.

== Sport ==
Surfing in Biarritz is of a world-class standard and first appeared in 1957. The town has a strong surfing culture, and is known worldwide for its surfing scene and the competitions it hosts yearly, including the Quiksilver/Roxy Jam tournament. In July 2011, Biarritz also hosted the Roxy Pro event, a tournament in the ASP Women's World Tour.

The town is home to a prominent rugby union club, Biarritz Olympique, who have won five French championships and two European Cups.

Basque pelota is a very popular sport in the Basque country. Several local and international competitions take place in Biarritz.

The golf course near the lighthouse (Le Phare) was established in 1888 by British residents. In addition, the town has a large circular golf range area on the border with Illbaritz.

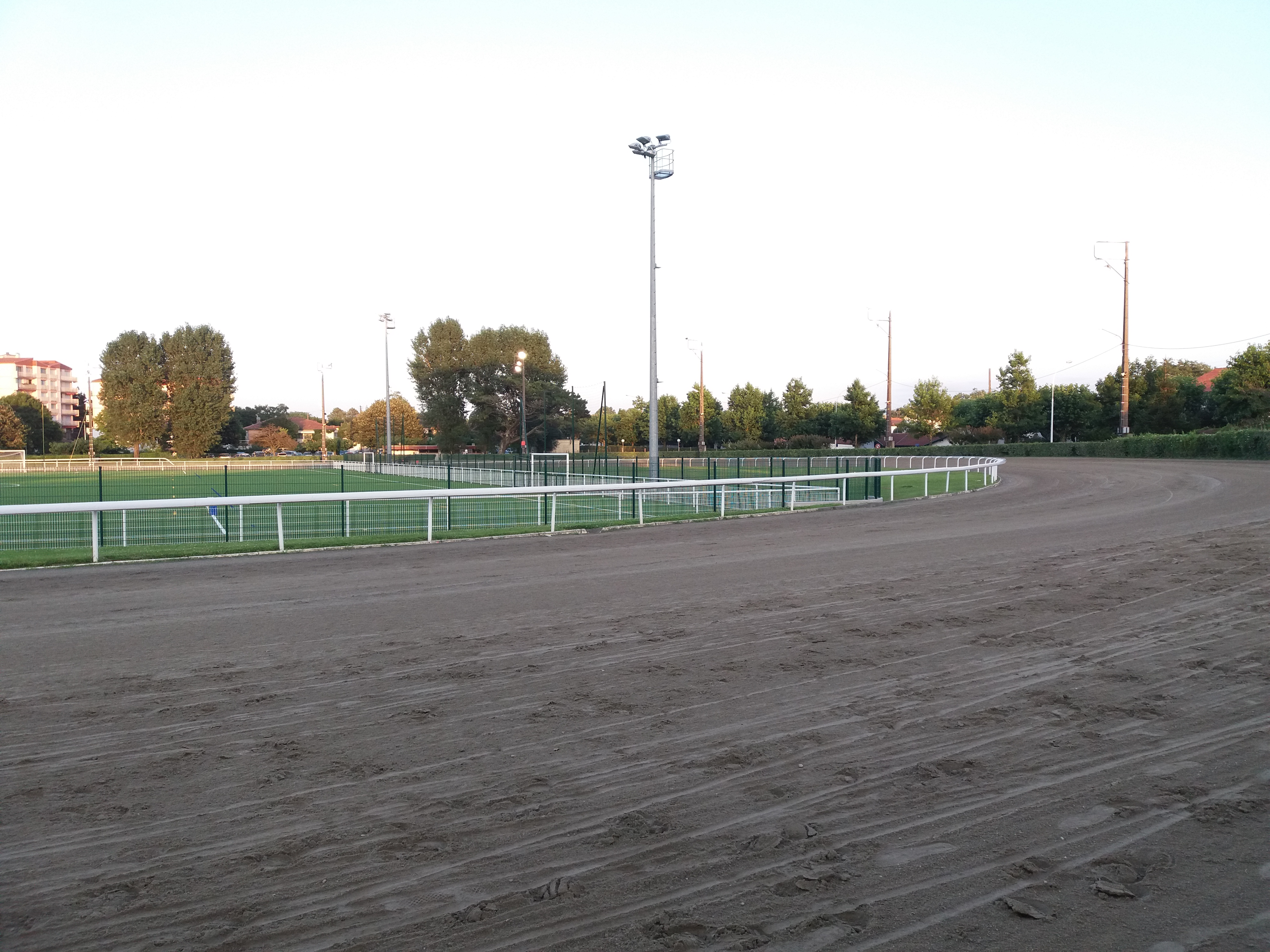
View of the Hippodrome des fleurs

The Hippodrome des fleurs is also located in Biarritz.

== Education ==
=== Schools ===
The city has two public schools (Villa Fal and Jean Rostand) and one private school (Immaculée-Conception).

=== High schools ===
Malraux High School is the only one in Biarritz. There is also a tourism high school on the border of the Western neighborhood of La Négresse.

== Transport ==
Biarritz station is easily accessible from Paris by France's high-speed train, the TGV, and regionally from Bordeaux, by TGV or TER. Trains are also available to travel east towards Toulouse. Night trains regularly depart from Irun, south of Biarritz, and pass through the city before heading to Paris during an overnight trip. Many tourists and regulars to the city have begun using the night train to take weekend trips to Biarritz and saving travel time by traveling at night. The Biarritz – Anglet – Bayonne Airport is located about four kilometres (2.5 miles) from the city. It is near the N10 road towards Anglet and is served by airlines from France, the United Kingdom, Spain, Ireland and Germany.

== Notable people and popular culture ==
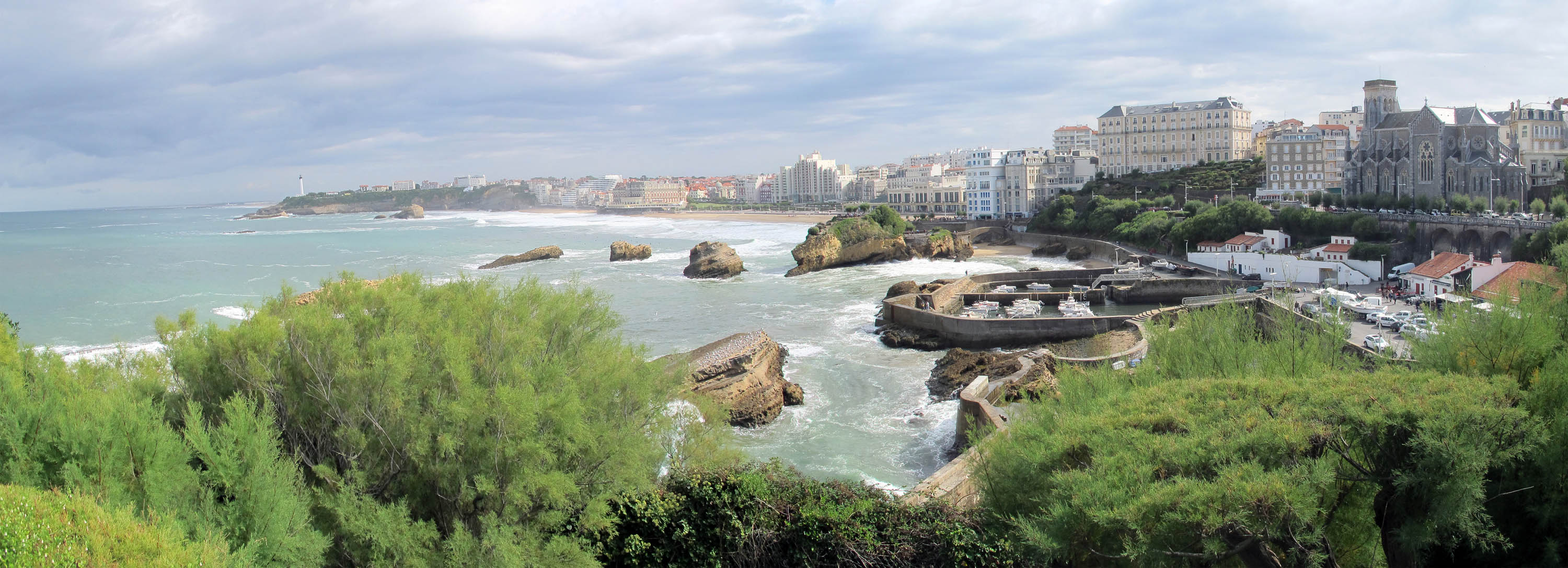
Fishing port, beach, and lighthouse

Biarritz was the birthplace of:

- Yannick Bellon (1924–2019), film director
- Jacques Bergerac (1927–2014), actor
- Jean Borotra (1898–1994), tennis player
- Léopold Eyharts (born 1957), astronaut
- Ernest Fourneau (1872–1949), chemist
- Maurice Hankey, 1st Baron Hankey (1877–1963), British civil servant
- Maurice Journeau (1898–1999), composer
- Arnaud Massy (1877–1950), professional golfer
- André Navarra (1911–1988), cellist
- Margaux Okou-Zouzouo (born 1991), basketball player

Other notable people associated with Biarritz:

- Aaron Bank (1902–2004), World War II Office of Strategic Services (OSS) agent and co-founder of the U.S. Army's Special Forces Group (later, Green Berets), a lifeguard and medical (physical) therapist's aide at Biarritz before he enlisted in the army in the late 1930s
- John Deacon (born 1951), bass player for the band Queen. Deacon and his wife Veronica spent their holidays in Biarritz and bought a holiday apartment there at the end of the 1980s, where they spent many months living in 1990
- Louis Dewis (1872–1946), born Louis DeWachter, Belgian Post-Impressionist who, after fleeing Paris at the beginning of World War II, settled here in 1940, living at Villa Pat in Bellefontaine until his death
- Aimée de Heeren, born Soto-Maior de Sá (1903–2006) WWII Secret Service agent for President Getúlio Vargas, owned many jewels of Eugenie de Montijo and the villa La Roseraie, 12 rue Martias, where she spent summers for half a century, receiving kings, heads of state, and many famous guests
- Eugénie de Montijo (1826–1920), Empress of the French as the wife of Napoléon III, who built the villa Eugénie, today the Hôtel du Palais
- Pablo de Sarasate (10 March 1844 – 20 September 1908), a well known Romantic Era Spanish composer born in Pamplona, Spain, who died in Biarritz

== Twin towns – sister cities ==
Biarritz is twinned with:

- Augusta, United States (1992)
- Cascais, Portugal (1986)
- Ixelles, Belgium (1958)
- Jerez de la Frontera, Spain (1997)
- Zaragoza, Spain (1986)

== Festivities ==
Saint Martin's Day is celebrated on November 11. On this date, the new gentleman of the Confrérie de l'Operne de Biarritz is proclaimed. Its logo is the barnacle and people with an interest in ecology are chosen. Since Biarritz is a city based on tourism, there are activities during the whole summer, such as pelota, equestrian competitions, concerts and recitals, folklore festivals, acrobatic water skiing, sea trips, performances, rugby competitions, bullfights, and night parties.

Since the summer of 2018, Biarritz has hosted the pop music festival, "Biarritz en été", whose second edition took place on July 19, 20, and 21, 2019.

== See also ==
- Cadillac Eldorado Biarritz, a personal luxury car whose trim level was named after the city
