= Okou =

Okou is a surname. Notable people with the surname include:

- Alfred Okou (born 1963), Ivorian rugby union player
- Rosvitha Okou (born 1986), Ivorian hurdler
- Stephane Okou, Ivorian footballer
- Teddy Okou (born 1998), French footballer
- Yllan Okou (born 2002), French footballer
- Margaux Okou-Zouzouo (born 1991), French basketball player
