= Hippodrome des fleurs =

Horse racecourse in Biarritz, France

Coordinates: 43°28′18″N 1°33′07″W

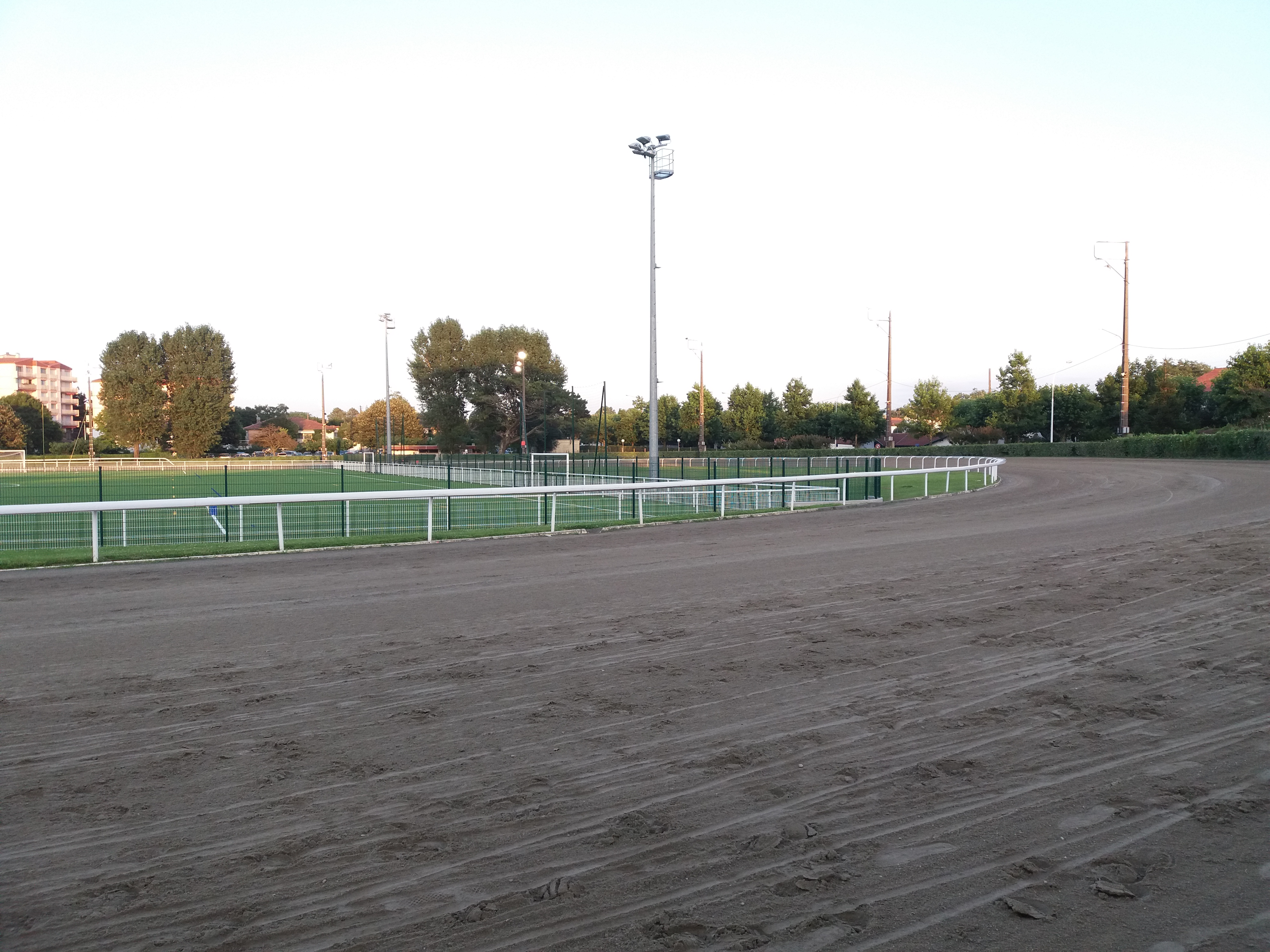
View of the Hippodrome des Fleurs

The Hippodrome des fleurs is a horse racing venue located in Biarritz in the Pyrénées-Atlantiques.

It is a trotting racecourse with an 803 m sand track with a right-hand rope. It is one of the shortest tracks in France, despite hosting regular races.

Although races had been formaly held in Biarritz at least since 1936, the racecourse was only opened in 1954, with the organiser being the Société de Courses au trot de Biarritz.
