= Margaux Okou-Zouzouo =

French basketball player

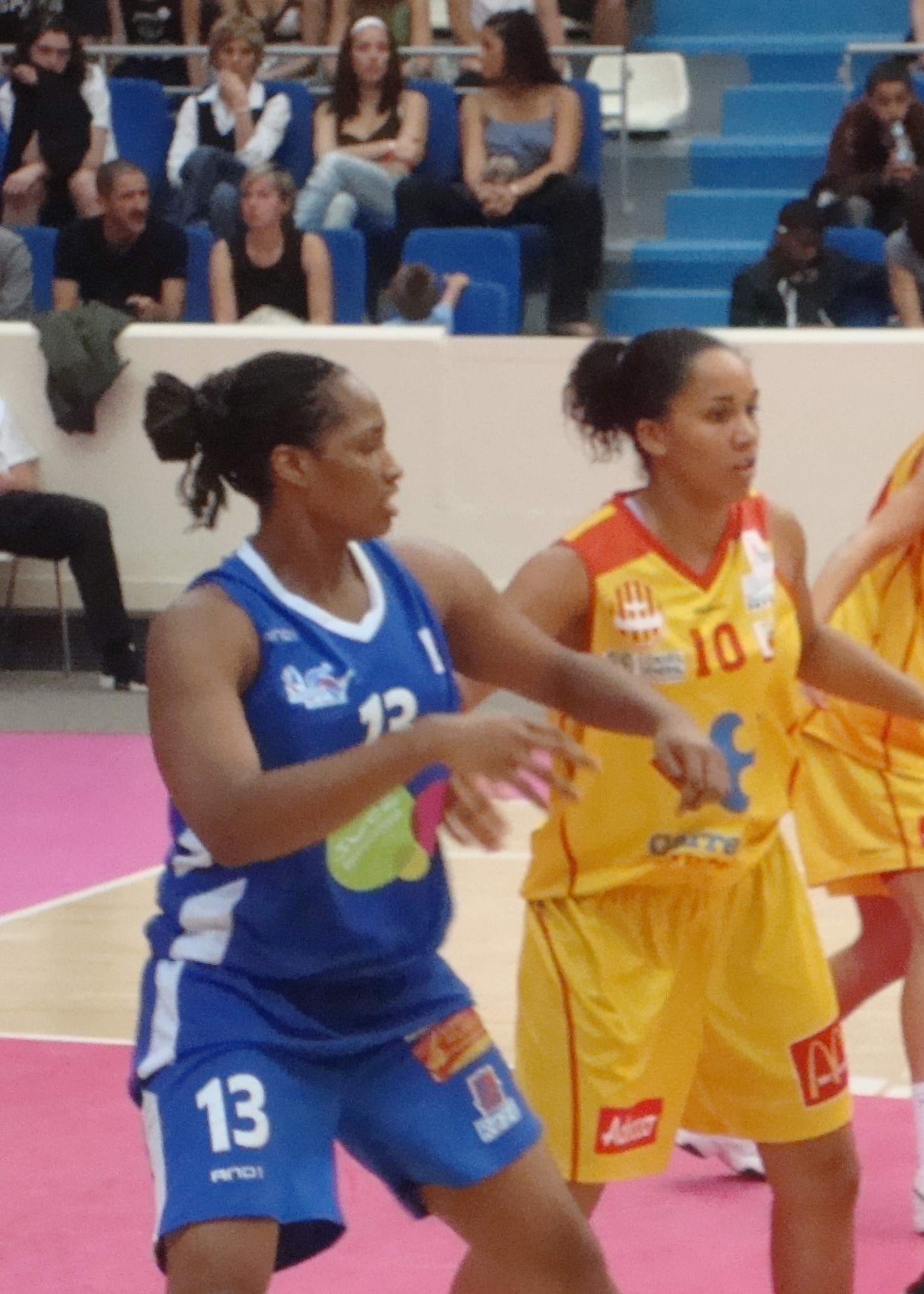
Doriane Tahane (in blue) and Margaux Okou-Zouzouo (in yellow) on September 27, 2009 in Paris.

Margaux Okou-Zouzouo (born February 18, 1991, in Biarritz, France) is a French basketball player who plays for club Aix en provence of the League feminine de basket the top league of basketball for women in France.
