= Aaron de Mey =

Make-up Artist

- Born: Aaron de Mey; Tauranga, New Zealand
- Education: Whitecliffe College of Arts and Design
- Occupation: Make-up artist

Aaron de Mey is a make-up artist from Tauranga, New Zealand.

== Early life ==
De Mey attended the Whitecliffe College of Arts and Design in Parnell, Auckland where he studied Fine Art. Shortly after, de Mey began working in the New Zealand fashion industry working on music videos, Pavement magazine, Levi's and with Helen Clark, the Prime Minister.

== Career ==
In 1997, de Mey left New Zealand for New York to become a freelance make-up artist. After just three weeks, he landed a job working with model Naomi Campbell for a 1997 cover of i-D Magazine. De Mey was then subsequently hired by François Nars as a freelance make-up artist. Around that same time period, he began working with Craig McDean and Edward Enninful (then fashion editor of i-D Magazine) on various fashion publications and advertising campaigns including Vogue Nippon, i-D, Jil Sander, and Calvin Klein, among others. By 2000, de Mey had worked with Bruce Weber and Joe McKenna for W and Vogue Italia editorials, as well as with Grace Coddington, Steven Klein and Arthur Elgort for American Vogue.

Lancôme signed de Mey as their International Artistic Creative Director of make-up in 2008. Pink Irreverence, his first collection for Lancôme, launched in 2009, inspired by his homeland of New Zealand. De Mey continued his work with Lancôme on collections including, Declaring Indigo, Oh My Rose, French Coquettes, 29 St. Honore, and Ultra Lavande.

De Mey has worked, as a make-up artist, with Mario Sorrenti, Patrick Demarchelier, Peter Lindbergh, Annie Leibovitz, David Sims, Paolo Roversi, Terry Richardson, Inez and Vinoodh, the late Corinne Day, Alasdair McLellan, Willy Vanderperre, and Tim Walker.

De Mey has also collaborated with fashion designers for advertising and runway clients including: Celine, Dior Homme, Comme des Garçons, Prada, Miu Miu, Giorgio Armani, Armani Privé, Emporio Armani, Givenchy, Rick Owens, Haider Ackermann, Vivienne Westwood, Alexander McQueen, YSL, Armani, Fendi, Rick Owens, Anna Sui, Marc Jacobs, The Row, and L'Wren Scott.

Aaron de Mey currently lives in New York and is represented exclusively by the Art Partner agency worldwide.
