= AZ (record label) =

- Parent company: Universal Music Group
- Founded: 2002
- Founder: Valéry Zeitoun
- Genre: Various
- Country of origin: France

AZ is a French record label established in 2002 as an affiliate of Universal Music Group with a big list of artists signed or with distribution rights for their releases in France.

== Valéry Zeitoun ==
The founder and first president of AZ record label, Valéry Zeitoun, was born in Pantin near Paris on 13 February 1966. He ran the label from its creation in 2002 until October 2011.

The label also encourages many new artists. Valéry Zeitoun (already a judge in the French television reality series Popstars in its second season in 2002) famously ran a campaign in 2010 on Facebook entitled Je veux signer chez AZ (meaning I want to sign with AZ). Two candidates were selected to join the label, namely Victor Le Douarec and Mélissa Nkonda. The campaign was so popular, Zeitoun ran a second series of casting for talent in 2011 resulting in signing of a third new artist, namely Alias Hilsum.

Valéry Zeitoun also appeared in film Backstage directed by Emmanuelle Bercot where he plays the role of manager of the singer Lauren Marks (played by Emmanuelle Seigner).

He continued to run the label until October 2011, but resigned from Universal Music France and AZ to consecrate himself to other projects.

== Julien Creuzard ==
Zeitoun was replaced in November 2011 by Julien Creuzard This was confirmed by Pascal Nègre in a communique. Nègre also wants the label to be more involved in development of young artists, whereas more established AZ artists will change label and be more integrated in other labels like Mercury.

Creuzard had joined Universal Music France in 2007, and was until his new assignment head of another affiliate, Universal Music Publishing. Musique Info says he had been instrumental in signing Yodelice, Féfé, Inna and Tom Frager. He also has experience running an independent production house.

== Artists ==
A complete list of artists (as of July 2010):

- Admiral T
- Alias Hilsum
- Absynthe Minded
- Amy Winehouse
- Benjamin Paulin
- Booba
- Catherine Lara
- Carmen Maria Vega
- Chimène
- Christophe
- Cheryl Cole
- Coco Sumner
- Creature
- Cyril Mokaiesh
- Dani
- Dan Black
- Davide Esposito
- Duffy
- Ellie Goulding
- Fally Ipupa
- Florent Pagny
- Florence and the Machine
- Gabriella Cilmi
- Gérard Darmon
- Gérard Palaprat
- Grand Corps Malade
- IAM
- Izia
- James Morrison
- John Mamann
- Julia Migenes
- Juliette Katz
- Kate Nash
- Keane
- Kool Shen
- Koxie
- Laszlo Jones
- Le comte de Bouderbala
- Les Chanteuses
- Michel Delpech
- Mélissa Nkonda
- Mokaiesh
- Okou
- Pascale Picard
- Paul Weller
- Pep's
- Professeur Love
- Queen
- Régine
- Saint André
- Salif
- Sara Schiralli
- Scissor Sisters
- Snow Patrol
- Souad Massi
- Starliners
- Sugababes
- Take That
- The Rolling Stones
- The Wanted
- Tom Frager
- Toma
- U2
- Victor Le Douarec
- VV Brown
- Yas
- Yeah Yeah Yeahs
