= List of Parlophone artists =

This list of Parlophone artists records the more notable musicians that are or have been signed by the company. As of 2023, the roster includes Lily Allen, Coldplay, Victoria Canal, David Guetta, Gorillaz, The Snuts, Conor Maynard, Aya Nakamura, Soprano, PinkPantheress and Ashnikko Its contemporary label, His Master's Voice, was focused on classical music and ceased issuing popular music recordings in 1967; later known as EMI Classics, it was absorbed into Warner Classics in 2013; afterwards, English Columbia was replaced by the EMI pop label.

Parlophone also operates Regal, a contemporary revival of the historic Columbia Graphophone budget/reissue label founded in 1914, and the French urban music label Rec.118, founded in 2016.

Because Parlophone Records Ltd. absorbed the catalogues of EMI Records UK, Roulette Records, the Columbia Graphophone Company (EMI Columbia), His Master's Voice, non-U.S. former artists of Harvest Records and some European divisions of EMI Music (with new reissues bearing the Parlophone label), only artists whose recordings were originally issued by Parlophone are listed here, either during its time as a subsidiary of EMI (1931–2012) or as a Warner Music sub-label (2013–present).

== Notable artists whose recordings were originally released on Parlophone ==
=== A to E ===
- Ilkka Alanko
- Damon Albarn
- Pablo Alboran (All of Pablo Alboran's albums originally released between 2011 and 2012 on EMI Music Spain are now owned by Parlophone Spain/Warner Music.)
- Alice in Chains (EMI originally released the band's 2009 studio album, Black Gives Way to Blue, in the UK through the Parlophone label. The album is now internationally controlled by Virgin Records and Universal Music Group.)
- All Saints
- Lily Allen
- Marc Almond
- Gabrielle Aplin
- Kim Appleby
- Ashnikko
- Arcadia
- Athlete (The band's back catalogue is controlled by newly independent, former EMI label Chrysalis Records and Blue Raincoat.)
- Jean-Louis Aubert (All of Jean-Louis Aubert's albums originally released between 1989 and 2012 on Virgin France and EMI Music France are now owned by Parlophone France/Warner Music.)
- Babyshambles
- John Barry Seven
- Bassheads
- Bat for Lashes
- The Beatles (The band's entire catalogue is retained by Universal Music Group and owned by Calderstone Productions Limited.)
- Belouis Some
- Classix Nouveaux
- Cliff Bennett and the Rebel Rousers
- Cilla Black
- Bliss
- Blur
- Steve Booker
- Brodinski
- The Chemical Brothers (The duo's catalogue is retained by Universal Music Group and now controlled by the new EMI Records and Astralwerks.)
- Chiddy Bang
- Chingy
- Rachel Chinouriri
- Chromeo
- Julien Clerc (All of Julien Clerc's albums originally released between 1970 and 2012 on Odeon Records, Pathé Records, Virgin France and EMI Music France are now owned by Parlophone France/Warner Music.)
- Club Cheval
- Joe Cocker
- Avishai Cohen
- Coldplay (Parlophone/Capitol, 2000–2014, Parlophone/Atlantic, 2014–present)
- Graham Coxon
- Bernard Cribbins
- Jim Dale
- Danger Mouse
- Dilated Peoples
- Dinosaur Pile-Up (Parlophone/Roadrunner/Elektra)
- Dirty Vegas (The band's back catalogue on EMI/Capitol/Parlophone is controlled by independent label New State Entertainment Limited.)
- Divine Comedy
- Pete Doherty
- Eliza Doolittle
- Duran Duran
- Idris Elba
- Electronic (The duo's entire catalogue is controlled in the US and Canada by Warner Records.)
- EMF (The rights to the band's Parlophone catalogue are managed by Believe Digital.)

=== F to J ===
- Adam Faith
- Shane Fenton
- Sky Ferreira (EMI originally released her 2010 single, One, in the UK and Europe through the Parlophone label. The single is now internationally controlled by Virgin Records and Universal Music Group.)
- Shane Filan
- Neil Finn (Two of Neil Finn's studio albums, 1998's Try Whistling This and 2001's One Nil, were distributed in the UK, Europe and Australasia through EMI and Parlophone. Both albums are now controlled by Finn's vanity label, Lester Records.)
- The Finn Brothers
- Flanders & Swann
- The Fourmost
- David Fray
- Gass
- Gesaffelstein
- Goldfrapp (The duo's 2012 compilation album, The Singles, was originally released in Europe as a joint partnership between EMI/Parlophone and Mute Records. It is now solely controlled by Mute as a BMG Rights Management subsidiary.)
- The Good, the Bad & the Queen
- The Good Natured
- The Goons
- Gorillaz
- David Guetta (All of David Guetta's albums originally released between 2002 and 2012 on Virgin France and EMI Music France are now owned by Parlophone France/Warner Music.)
- George Harrison (George Harrison's entire catalogue on Dark Horse Records, Parlophone and EMI is retained by Universal Music Group and owned by Calderstone Productions Limited.)
- Richard Hawley
- Becky Hill
- The Hollies
- Hot Chip
- Hyphen Hyphen
- Idlewild
- Igit
- Interpol
- Inti-Illimani
- Iron Maiden (The band's entire catalogue is controlled in the US and Canada by BMG Rights Management through Sanctuary Records.)
- Thomas Jack
- Jamelia
- Dick James
- Norah Jones (Two of Norah Jones's studio albums, 2002's Come Away With Me and 2004's Feels Like Home, were distributed in the UK and Europe through the Parlophone label. Both albums are now internationally controlled and reissued by Blue Note Records and Universal Music Group.)

=== K to O ===
- Kano
- Georgi Kay
- Keith Kelly
- The King Brothers
- Beverley Knight
- Kraftwerk
- Billy J. Kramer and The Dakotas
- Kay Kyser
- Late of the Pier
- Mary Lee
- Bobby Lewis
- Lasse Lindh
- Laurie London
- Bonnie Lou
- Love Sculpture
- Jeremy Lubbock
- Humphrey Lyttelton
- Mansun (The band's entire catalogue on Parlophone is retained by Snapper Music and is now controlled by Kscope.)
- Matoma
- Matrix & Futurebound
- Conor Maynard
- Paul McCartney (Paul McCartney's entire catalogue on Parlophone and EMI is now retained by Universal Music Group and owned by MPL Communications.)
- Mickey 3D (All of the band's albums originally released between 1998 and 2012 on Virgin France and EMI Music France are now owned by Parlophone France/Warner Music.)
- Kylie Minogue (All of Kylie Minogue's albums released from 2000 to 2015 are distributed worldwide through Parlophone Records Limited, except in Australia where Festival Mushroom Records and Warner Music Australasia handle the distribution.)
- Matt Monro
- Ivor Moreton and Dave Kaye
- Morning Parade
- Morrissey
- MPHO
- Mrs Mills
- Aya Nakamura (Signed to Rec. 118.)
- Ninho (Signed to Rec. 118.)

=== P to T ===
- The Paramounts
- Bob and Alf Pearson
- Pet Shop Boys
- PinkPantheress
- Matt Pokora
- Duffy Power
- Queen (The band's entire catalogue is now controlled by the Universal Music Group through its EMI Records division internationally, until 2027 when it will pass to Sony Music and by Hollywood Records in the US and Canada.)
- Queen + Paul Rodgers (same as the previous band)
- Radiohead (As of 2016, the band's entire back catalogue, originally released on EMI and Parlophone from 1993 to 2004, is now controlled by XL Recordings, a Beggars Group sub-label. US distribution was also formerly handled by Warner Music's Alternative Distribution Alliance until 2020, when Beggars switched distributors to Redeye.)
- Rainbow Ffolly
- Rat Boy
- Renaud (All of Renaud's albums originally released between 1985 and 2009 on Virgin France and EMI Music France are now owned by Parlophone France/Warner Music.)
- Sigur Rós
- Roxette
- Neljä Ruusua
- Safia
- Edna Savage
- Saint Motel
- Mike Sarne
- Scarlet Party
- SCH (Signed to Rec. 118.)
- Peter Sellers
- Shampoo
- Silent Running (band)
- Silver Bullet
- Luke Sital-Singh
- Skin
- Soprano (Signed to Rec. 118.)
- Sons Of Fred. 1965 Release.
- Alain Souchon (All of Alain Souchon's albums originally released between 1985 and 2011 on Virgin France and EMI Music France are now owned by Parlophone France/Warner Music.)
- Soulwax
- Sparklehorse (EMI originally released the band's first two studio albums, 1995's Vivadixiesubmarinetransmissionplot and 1998's Good Morning Spider, in the UK through the Parlophone label. These albums are now internationally controlled by Capitol Records and Universal Music Group.)
- Dusty Springfield
- Dorothy Squires
- St. Germain
- Stereophonics
- Supergrass (As of 2017, the band's catalogue is controlled by BMG Rights Management through The Echo Label.)
- Synapson
- Tages
- Talk Talk (Warner Music owns the entirety of the band's catalogue originally released on EMI UK and Parlophone from 1982 to 1988 -including the 1998 compilation Asides Besides-, except for their fifth and final studio album, Laughing Stock, released in 1991 on Verve Records and Polydor Records.)
- Vince Taylor
- The Temperance Seven
- Tinie Tempah
- Bobby Tench
- Teresa Teng
- Gyllene Tider
- Tomorrow
- Tina Turner
- Two Door Cinema Club
- The Snuts

=== U to Z ===
- VANT
- The Verve (EMI originally released the band's 2008 studio album, Forth, in Europe through the Parlophone label. It is now controlled by Virgin Records and Universal Music Group in this territory.)
- Victoria Canal
- The Vipers Skiffle Group
- Waltari
- W.A.S.P.
- Otis Waygood
- Paul Weller
- Keith West
- Hindi Zahra

== Notable artists whose recordings are re-issued by Parlophone and Warner Music but were originally distributed by other labels ==
- 2Be3
- Adiemus
- Air (Parlophone France/Warner Music owns the duo's first three studio albums and debut EP that were originally released on Virgin France and EMI from 1997 to 2004: Premiers Symptômes, Moon Safari, 10 000 Hz Legend and Talkie Walkie.)
- Akhenaton
- The Animals
- Ärsenik
- Charles Aznavour
- Syd Barrett (Parlophone UK/Warner Music owns the entirety of Syd Barrett's solo catalogue, as his recordings were originally released on EMI UK and the European division of Harvest Records.)
- Jeff Beck (Jeff Beck's first two studio albums, 1968's Truth and 1969's Beck-Ola, which were originally released on EMI Columbia in Europe and Japan, are now distributed by Parlophone UK/Warner Music in these territories. Both albums are still owned by Epic Records and Sony Music Entertainment in North America.)
- Bonzo Dog Doo-Dah Band
- David Bowie (Parlophone UK/Warner Music owns the entirety of David Bowie's solo catalogue recorded from 1969 -David Bowie (Space Oddity)- to 1999 -LiveAndWell.com-. His post-2002 catalogue, counting studio and live albums such as Heathen, Reality, A Reality Tour, The Next Day, Blackstar and No Plan, is distributed and owned by Columbia Records and Sony Music Entertainment, whereas his catalogue on Deram Records including his 1967 self-titled debut studio album is owned by Decca Records and Universal Music Group.)
- Burning Spear
- Kate Bush (Parlophone UK/Warner Music owns Kate Bush's three first studio albums that were originally released on EMI UK from 1979 to 1980: The Kick Inside, Lionheart and Never for Ever. The remainder of her catalogue is owned and copyrighted by her own company, Noble and Brite Ltd., but Parlophone is still in charge of its worldwide distribution.)
- Matthieu Chedid
- Count Basie
- Daft Punk (Between 2013 and 2021, Parlophone France and Warner Music France held the ownership of the duo's catalogue that was originally released on Virgin France and EMI Music France from 1995 -Da Funk- to 2007 -Alive 2007-. As of 2021, the Virgin Records catalogue is now re-issued through the duo's vanity label "Daft Life Ltd." and the Warner Music Group subsidiary Alternative Distribution Alliance. Their fourth and final studio album, Random Access Memories, was released in 2013 on Columbia Records and Sony Music Entertainment. Their 2010 Tron: Legacy soundtrack is owned by Walt Disney Records and Universal Music Group.)
- Étienne Daho (Parlophone France/Warner Music owns all of Étienne Daho's recordings which were originally released between 1981 and 2010 on Virgin, Capitol and EMI Music in France.)
- Kiki Dee
- Deep Purple (In Europe, Parlophone UK/Warner Music owns and distributes all of Deep Purple's albums which were released between 1968 -Shades of Deep Purple- and 1971 -Fireball- on EMI and the European division of Harvest Records. These recordings are still owned and distributed by Warner Records in North America. Universal Music Enterprises handles the re-releases of Purple Records-era albums originally recorded between 1972 and 1975, starting with Machine Head. UMe also owns Abandon and Bananas, the band's last EMI albums previously released in selected European countries.)
- Doc Gynéco (Parlophone France/Warner Music owns all of Doc Gynéco's recordings that were originally released between 1996 and 2002 on Virgin France and EMI Music France.)
- Diam's (Parlophone France/Warner Music owns the entirety of Diam's' catalogue, as all of her recordings were originally released on Delabel, Virgin France and EMI Music France.)
- Dr. Feelgood
- The Dubliners
- Baxter Dury (Parlophone UK/Warner Music owns Baxter Dury's only release on EMI UK, 2011's Happy Soup.)
- Brigitte Fontaine (Parlophone France/Warner Music owns all of Brigitte Fontaine's recordings that were originally released between 1995 -Genre humain- and 2004's -Rue Saint Louis En L'île- on Virgin France and EMI Music France.)
- Fischer-Z
- Gabinete Caligari
- Gang of Four (Parlophone UK/Warner Music distributes the band's first four studio albums -Entertainment!, Solid Gold, Songs of the Free and Hard- plus the untitled 1980 Yellow EP in Europe, as they were originally released on EMI in this territory. These recordings are still owned and distributed by Warner Records in North America.)
- David Gilmour (In Europe, Parlophone UK/Warner Music owns and distributes all of David Gilmour's live and studio albums originally released on EMI Records and the European division of Harvest Records between 1978 -David Gilmour- and 2008 -Live in Gdańsk- in this territory. These recordings are still owned and distributed by Columbia Records in North America.)
- Raymond van het Groenewoud
- Geri Halliwell (Parlophone UK/Warner Music owns the entirety of Geri Halliwell's solo catalogue, as all of her recordings were originally released on EMI UK.)
- Hawkwind
- Hercules and Love Affair
- Héroes del Silencio (The band's entire back catalogue is owned by Parlophone Spain/Warner Music, as all of their studio and live recordings were originally released on EMI Music Spain between 1987 and 2011.)
- Hot Chocolate
- IAM (Parlophone France/Warner Music owns all of the band's recordings that were originally released between 1991 -...De la planète Mars- and 2003 -Revoir un printemps- on Delabel, Virgin France and EMI Music France).
- Jethro Tull
- Kajagoogoo
- KC and the Sunshine Band
- Larusso (Parlophone France/Warner Music owns the entirety of Larusso's catalogue, as all of her recordings were originally released on EMI Music France.)
- LCD Soundsystem (Warner Music owns the entirety of the band's catalogue that was originally released on EMI/DFA/Capitol in North America and EMI/Parlophone/Virgin in Europe from 2005 to 2010. During the band's hiatus, Parlophone and Warner Bros. Records released in 2014 the live album The Long Goodbye: LCD Soundsystem Live at Madison Square Garden, that compromised the entirety of what was billed at the time their "final" show held at Madison Square Garden in April 2011. Their fourth studio album American Dream was released in 2017 on Columbia Records.)
- Louisiana Red
- Machiavel
- Gérard Manset
- Marillion (The live album Made Again is only distributed by Parlophone/Warner Music in the UK and by BMG Rights Management, owner of Sanctuary Records, worldwide. The rest of the EMI catalogue, released between 1982 and 1994, is solely owned by Parlophone UK.)
- Jeanne Mas
- Nick Mason
- Milk Inc.
- Marc Moulin
- The Move
- Róisín Murphy
- Beth Orton (Parlophone UK/Warner Music owns two of her studio albums and one compilation that were originally released on Heavenly Recordings/EMI in Europe and Astralwerks in North America from 2002 to 2006: Daybreaker, The Other Side of Daybreak and Comfort of Strangers.)
- Phœnix (Parlophone France/Warner Music owns three of the band's studio albums that were originally released on Virgin France and EMI Music France from 2000 to 2006: United, Alphabetical and It's Never Been Like That.)
- Pilot
- Pink Floyd (Parlophone and Warner Music only distributes Pink Floyd's catalogue in Europe. At a worldwide scale, the distribution is done by Legacy Recordings and Sony Music Entertainment.)
- The Proclaimers
- The Ramones (Europe/UK only; Geffen Records and Universal Music Enterprises own the US and Canadian rights to the band's recordings originally released by MCA Records-distributed Radioactive Records label.)
- Dick Rivers
- Diana Ross (In Europe, Parlophone UK/Warner Music owns and distributes all of Diana Ross' albums originally released on Capitol Records and EMI Music Group between 1981 -Why Do Fools Fall in Love- and 2006 -I Love You- in this territory. In North America, her 1981-1987 RCA Records catalogue is still owned by Sony Music Entertainment, whereas her 1989-2006 Motown catalogue is owned by parent company Universal Music Group.)
- Röyksopp
- Kate Ryan
- The Seekers
- The Shadows
- Shurik'n
- Labi Siffre
- Nina Simone
- Spandau Ballet (Parlophone UK/Warner Music owns four of the band's studio albums that were originally released on Chrysalis Records from 1981 to 1984: Journeys to Glory, Diamond, True and Parade.)
- Starsailor
- Al Stewart
- The Stranglers
- Talking Heads (In Europe and the UK, Parlophone/Warner Music owns and distributes the band's 1984-1988 catalogue, including studio and live albums such as Stop Making Sense, Little Creatures, True Stories and Naked. The mentioned recordings were originally released on EMI Records in these territories, and are still distributed by Sire Records/Warner Records in North America.)
- Téléphone (Parlophone France/Warner Music owns the entirety of the band's catalogue, as all of their live and studio recordings were originally released on EMI Columbia, Pathé Records, Virgin France and EMI Music France between 1977 and 2000.)
- Jake Thackray
- The Juan MacLean (Parlophone UK/Warner Music owns The Juan McLean's debut studio album, 2005's Less Than Human, as it was originally released on EMI/DFA in Europe and Astralwerks in North America.)
- Thunder
- Yann Tiersen (Parlophone France/Warner Music owns all of Yann Tiersen's recordings which were originally released between 2001 and 2006 on Labels, Virgin France and EMI Music France.)
- Tin Machine (Parlophone UK/Warner Music owns the band's 1988 debut self-titled studio album that was originally released on EMI USA. A previously unreleased live album titled Live at La Cigale, Paris, 25th June, 1989 was released in August 2019 by Parlophone and the David Bowie Estate. The band's second and final studio album, 1992's Tin Machine II, is still distributed and owned by Victor Entertainment.)
- Peter Tosh
- Twelve Caesars (Parlophone Sweden/Warner Music owns all of Twelve Caesars' recordings which were originally released between 2002 and 2008 on Astralwerks, Virgin Records and EMI Music Sweden).
- Vanessa-Mae (Parlophone UK/Warner Music owns all of Vanessa-Mae's recordings which were originally released between 1995 and 2001 on EMI UK.)
- Sarah Vaughan
- Dinah Washington
- Whitesnake
- Dana Winner
- Roy Wood
- Richard Wright (Parlophone UK/Warner Music owns both of Richard Wright's studio releases, 1978's Wet Dream and 1996's Broken China, as they were originally released on EMI UK and the European division of Harvest Records .)
- The Yardbirds
- Zaho
