= L'École du micro d'argent =

L'École du Micro d'Argent

Studio album by IAM
- Released: 18 March 1997
- Recorded: 1996–1997
- Genres: French hip hop; conscious rap
- Length: 73:51
- Labels: EMI Records; Delabel; Côté Obscur; Virgin Records
- Producers: Imhotep, Khéops, Akhenaton, Shurik'n

IAM chronology
Ombre Est Lumière (1993)	L'École du Micro d'Argent (1997)	Revoir un printemps (2003)

L'École du Micro d'Argent (pronounced [lekɔl dy mikʁo daʁʒɑ̃]; The School of the Silver Mic) is an album recorded by IAM. The band became famous worldwide with this album, a classic in French hip-hop music. It was partly recorded in the US, with some aesthetic influences brought by RZA of the Wu-Tang Clan. On the track "L'Enfer", a sample from Lalo Schifrin's music for Don Siegel's movie "Dirty Harry" can be heard (the electric piano notes).

== Themes ==
The album deals with very realistic and dark topics in a sometimes violent and often dark vocal performance. Though it contains few happy "ego-trip" songs, most of these ego songs deal with war metaphors and are sung with violent tone and rhythm. More than the ego schemes, the main topic of the album stay the criticism of French society: life in poor suburbs which leads to a reference to slavery, violence of the youth connected with the violence in television and movies, censorship, racism. At least three songs deal with prostitution, but in ways from irony and fun to violent and dark realism.

== Reception and legacy ==
Professional ratings
Review scores
Source	Rating
Allmusic	4.5/5 stars
Laut.de	5/5 stars

The album was a huge success in France. It was said to have sold 1,200,000 copies by rapper Akhenaton in his autobiography La Face B and 1 400 000 copies in a 2011 interview. Other sources tell of 1,500,000 copies. The album is officially certified diamond (1,000,000 copies at the time). In the months following its release, eight of its tracks were played on the rap radio station Skyrock, despite only 4 of them had a music video. The song "Demain, c'est loin", too long to be played on radios, had a music video too. It remains the best selling French hip-hop album in history.

It is widely considered, among both professionals and the audience, as the best French rap album of all time, though not by the band itself. The album is often quoted as the exception by those who don't like IAM, massilian rap, or French rap in general. The 9 minutes long song "Demain c'est loin" which ends the album has often been quoted as the French Rap Anthem and the best French rap song ever.

Later different versions were released. The version edited now has the song "Libère mon imagination" replaced by the song "Independenza", a single released more than one year after the album and not included in it.

The album won the "Best album of the year" prize (all kinds of genres included) at the French Music Awards ceremony of 1998.

The album is considered to have widely influenced French rap artists and French music industry, opening a new era of success for French rap.

== Track listing ==
- All tracks written by IAM (Akhenaton, Shurik'n and one verse by Freeman, former dancer of the group).
1. "L'École du Micro d'Argent" - 3:52
2. "Dangereux" (featuring Bruizza & Rahzel) - 3:46
3. "Nés sous la même étoile" - 3:50
4. "La Saga" (featuring Timbo King, Dreddy Krueger & Prodigal Sunn) - 4:02
5. "Petit frère" - 4:44
6. "Elle donne son corps avant son nom" - 4:12
7. "L'Empire du Côté Obscur" - 4:22
8. "Regarde" - 3:56
9. "L'Enfer" (featuring East & Fabe) - 4:51
10. "Quand tu allais, on revenait" - 4:48
11. "Chez le mac" - 4:42
12. "Un bon son brut pour les truands" - 3:49
13. "Bouger la tête" - 4:43
14. "Un cri court dans la nuit" (featuring Daddy Nuttea) - 3:53
15. "Libère mon imagination" - 5:22
16. "Demain, c'est loin" - 8:59

== Samples used ==
- Nés sous la même étoile: Murder in the first (Christopher Young)
- Elle donne son corps avant son nom: I hate I walked away (Syl Johnson)
- Chez le mac: Bills (The Counts)
- Independenza: I will live my love for you (Millie Jackson)
- Un bon son brut pour les truands: Passacaglia (Yusef Lateef)
- Petit Frère: C.R.E.A.M. (Wu-Tang Clan)
- La Saga: Memphis in June (Ramsey Lewis)
- L'enfer: Dirty Harry - End Titles (Lalo Schifrin)

== Charts ==
=== Weekly charts ===
Chart (1997)	Peak position
Belgian Albums (Ultratop Wallonia)	5
French Albums (SNEP)	3

=== Year-end charts ===
Chart (1997)	Position
Belgian Albums (Ultratop Wallonia)	22
French Albums (SNEP)	7
Chart (1998)	Position
Belgian Albums (Ultratop Wallonia)	41
French Albums (SNEP)	33
Chart (2021)	Position
Belgian Albums (Ultratop Wallonia)	185
