= Fonky Family =

French rap group

Background information
- Also known as: FF
- Origin: France
- Genres: Hip hop, French rap
- Years active: 1994-2007
- Labels: Small (Sony Music); Jive Epic
- Past members: Le Rat Luciano (rap); Sat l'Artificier (rap); Don Choa (rap); Menzo (rap); Pone (producer); DJ Djel (DJing); Fel (dancer); Karima (vocals); Flex (vocals); Fafa (management)

Fonky Family (/fʌŋki/) or La Fonky Family (often shortened to La Fonky, or La FF), is a French hip hop band from Marseille, consisting of four rappers, Le Rat Luciano, Menzo, Don Choa and Sat, producer Pone, DJ Djel, dancer Blaze, singer Karima, Flex (fetus) Nandell, and manager Fafa.

Fonky Family made their first appearance on the French hip hop scene in 1994, after IAM had paved the way for new hip hop artists originating from Marseille. In 1995, they appeared in the song titled "Les Bad Boys de Marseille" on Métèque et mat, the first solo album by IAM's Akhenaton. Their first album, Si Dieu veut..., came out in 1997 and soon received a gold album. Karima left the group before the release of the album.

In 1998, the group were invited to collaborate with Akhenaton on the soundtrack of Luc Besson's film Taxi. The film became a huge success and its soundtrack topped the French charts. After numerous collaborations with different members of IAM on their solo albums, the group released one EP record with six live and edited titles, titled Hors série volume 1, in spring 1999. Hors série volume 2 was released in 2000.

Their second album, Art de rue, came out in 2001. After that, many members of the group chose to pursue solo careers: Le Rat Luciano had already released a solo album in 2000, and Sat and Don Choa followed in 2001 and 2002 respectively. DJ Djel produced two compilations in 2001 and 2003.

In January 2006, Fonky Family released their third album Marginale musique (Jive/Sony BMG), which debuted on the French charts straight at number one.

Fonky Family have a global music publishing deal with BMG Music Publishing.

Fonky Family's track "La Furie et la Foi" was used as the soundtrack for French skateboarder J. B. Gillet's part in the film Rodney Vs Daewon Round II.

== Lead members ==
=== Le Rat Luciano ===
Le Rat Luciano (French pronunciation: [ləʁa lutʃjano]; real name Christophe Carmona [kʁistɔf kaʁmɔna]; born 9 April 1976) is a French rapper from Marseille. His father is of Spanish origin and his mother comes from Martinique. He got noticed as a rapper in 1994 when he was part of the group Fonky Family.

=== Sat l'Artificier ===
Sat l'Artificier or just Sat born Karim Haddouche in Marseille on September 16, 1975 in Marseille, France), is a French rapper of Algerian origin and is a member of the group Fonky Family. Born to an Algerian father and French mother of Corsican descent, Sat discovered rap at an early age. In 1993, along with his neighborhood friends Le Rat Luciano, Don Choa and Menzo, they created the group Fonky Family. After meeting with IAM's Akhenaton (rapper) they started working on their first album. Since then, the group has released 4 albums and are considered one of the biggest rap groups in France.

== Discography ==
=== Albums ===
Title	Year	Peak chart positions		
Title	Year	FRA	BEL (Wa)	SWI
Si Dieu Veut...	1998	9	-	-
Art de Rue	2001	2	2	26
Marginale Musique	2006	1	15	14

=== Live albums ===
Title	Year	Peak chart positions		
Title	Year	FRA	BEL (Wa)	SWI
Live au Dôme de Marseille	2003	13	21	50

=== EPs ===
Title	Year	Peak chart positions		
Title	Year	FRA	BEL (Wa)	SWI
Hors Série Vol. 1	1999	4	-	-
Hors Série Vol. 2	2001	16	41	88

=== Others ===
- 2001: Si Dieu veut / Art de rue (Peak FR: #89)
- 2002: Art de rue / Hors Serie Vol. 2 (Peak FR: #135)

=== Singles ===
Title	Year	Peak chart positions	
Title	Year	FRA	BEL (Wa)
"Bad Boys de Marseille" (Akhenaton with La Fonky Family)	1996	13	33
"16'30 contre la censure" (Abou / Akhenaton / Basic / Chien De Paille / Driver / Eben & Niro / Fonky Family / Insomniak / KDD / L'Ame Du Razwar / Menelik / Mystik etc.)	1999	22	-
"Les Ennemis (El Aâdyene)" (Khaled vs. Fonky Family)	2000	63	-
"Marginale musique"	2006	57	-
