= Je danse le Mia =

Single by IAM

from the album Ombre est Lumière
- B-side: "Ombre est Lumière"; "Je fais 1 avec ma musique"; "L'Ultra Mia" (CD maxi)
- Released: February, 1994
- Recorded: France
- Genre: Hip hop, R&B
- Length: 4:34
- Label: Delabel
- Songwriters: IAM; Akhenaton

IAM singles chronology
"Donne-moi le micro" (1993)	"Je danse le Mia" (1994)	"Le Feu" (1994)

Audio sample
- IAM - "Je danse le mia" (Le Terrible Funk Remix Radio Edit): file; help

"Je danse le Mia" is a 1994 popular song recorded by the French hip hop band IAM. It was released as the first single from their second album, Ombre est Lumière, in February 1994. The song became a major hit in France, reaching #1, and is often considered the signature song of the band.

== Music, lyrics, and music video ==
"Je danse le Mia" (a play on the name of the band, IAM) was written and composed by IAM: rappers Akhenaton, Shurik'n, DJ Kheops, and DJ/beat maker Imhotep.

It used a sample from George Benson's song, "Give Me the Night" (which was also used in 2005 by Jean Dujardin with his song "Le Casse de Brice"). This song, which has a "joyful, nostalgic and funky melody", is not representative of the musical universe of the group, which is traditionally characterized by "pessimistic texts" and "most slightly acid musics". Nevertheless, the real theme of the song is not dancing and nightclubs, but the collapse of time represented by nostalgia for the Eighties and dance.

The music video, directed by Michel Gondry and produced by Midi Minuit, shows the lead singer in various situations, most notably dancing in a nightclub. Throughout the video, after an image is shown, the camera then makes several successive zoom ins or zoom outs. Many other band members and extras also appear in the video.

== Chart performance ==
In France, "Je danse le Mia" spent 32 weeks on the chart in 1994. It debuted at #44, but climbed quickly on the chart, reaching number-one only three weeks later. It stayed at the top for eight non-consecutive weeks, alternating with Bruce Springsteen's "Streets of Philadelphia". The single managed to remain in the top ten for 22 weeks. Certified Gold disc by the SNEP, it featured at #2 on the End of the Year Chart, behind "7 Seconds", by Youssou N'Dour and Neneh Cherry. It re-charted for one week in 2001, then for two weeks in 2004, but stayed at the bottom of the top 100.

The song was covered by Les Enfoirés on their album 2011: Dans l'œil des Enfoirés, and included in the medley "À la porte du Night Club". The song has been performed by Grégoire & Thomas Dutronc.

== Track listings ==
CD single

1. "Je danse le Mia" (le terrible funk remix radio edit)
2. "Je danse le Mia" (original version)

CD maxi

1. "Je danse le Mia" — 4:34
2. "Ombre est Lumière" — 5:28
3. "Je fais 1 avec ma musique" — 5:17
4. "L'Ultra Mia" — 4:12

Cassette

1. "Je danse le Mia" (le terrible funk remix radio edit)
2. "Je danse le Mia" (original version)

12" maxi

1. "Je danse le Mia" (le terrible funk remix radio edit)
2. "Je danse le Mia" (instrumental)
3. "Ombre est Lumière"
4. "Je fais 1 avec ma musique"

== Certifications ==
Country	Certification	Date	Sales certified
France	Gold	October 20, 1994	250,000

== Charts ==
Chart (1994)	Peak position
French SNEP Singles Chart	1
Chart (2001)	Peak position
French SNEP Singles Chart	88
Chart (2004)	Peak position
French SNEP Singles Chart	95

End of year chart (1994)	Position
French Singles Chart	2
