= Sentenza =

Sentenza may refer to:

- Sentenza (Italian for "Verdict" or "Sentence"), also known as "Angel Eyes", the titular "Bad" in the movie The Good, the Bad and the Ugly, played by Lee Van Cleef.
- Akhenaton, a French rapper
