= Comme un aimant =

Comme un aimant (The Magnet)
- Theatrical release poster
- Directed by: Akhenaton; Kamel Saleh
- Written by: Akhenaton; Kamel Saleh
- Produced by: Pascal Caucheteux; Richard Grandpierre
- Starring: Brahim Aimad; Houari Djerir; Kamel Saleh; Akhenaton; Sofiane Madjid Mammeri; Freeman; Titoff; Kamel Ferrat
- Cinematography: Denis Rouden
- Edited by: Fabrice Salinie
- Music by: Bruno Coulais; Akhenaton
- Production companies: Eskwad; Why Not Productions; Le Studio Canal+ La Société 361
- Distributed by: Mars Distribution
- Release date: May 31, 2000 (France)
- Running time: 100 minutes
- Country: France
- Language: French

Comme un aimant (released in the USA as The Magnet) is a 2000 French crime drama film by Kamel Saleh and Akhenaton. It depicts eight young people living in the district of Panier, in Marseille.

The film's title means 'like a magnet', and is a reference to a line in the film accusing two characters of being lazy and 'sitting there with your asses stuck to that bench like a magnet'.

== Cast ==
- Akhenaton as Sauveur
- Kamel Saleh as Cahouètte
- Brahim Aimad as Bra-Bra
- Freeman as Kakou
- Houari Djerir as Houari
- Kamel Ferrat as Fouad
- Titoff as Santino
- Sofiane Madjid Mammeri as Christian
- Khalil Mohamed as Kader
- Virginie Gallo as Nathalie
- Nadège Mignien as Béatrice
- Bérangère Topart as Sylvie
- Ahamed Abdou as Jackson

== Soundtrack ==
The film's soundtrack is written by Bruno Coulais and Akhenaton, and it includes songs by IAM, Millie Jackson, Dennis Edwards of the Temptations, Isaac Hayes, Mario Castiglia and Cunnie Williams. The tracklist:

1. Prisoners of love - Millie Jackson feat. Shurik'n
2. Life goes on - Cunnie Williams
3. La pluie d'un désert - Psy4 De La Rime
4. Is it really home ? - Isaac Hayes
5. La qibla - K-Rhyme Le Roi
6. Prime example - Talib Kweli
7. Sugar - Gerald Alston
8. Comme un aimant - Chiens de paille
9. You promised me - The Dells
10. Life - Marlena Shaw feat. Tony & Paco
11. Dir yassin - Millie Jackson
12. Ammore Annascunnuto - Mario Castiglia
13. What's your answer - Marlena Shaw
14. S - Bruizza
15. Ultima Forsan - Coloquinte
16. Affrescu - A Filetta
17. J'voulais dire - Akhenaton
18. One day my soul opened up - Millie Jackson
19. Sta Voglia E'te - Mario Castiglia
20. Riding in my car - Dennis Edwards
21. Belsunce Breakdown - Bouga

== In popular culture ==
The film's title "Comme un aimant" is also a song by IAM, a French hip hop band from Marseille which Akhenaton and Freeman, two of the actors, belong to.
