= Sat l'Artificier =

Sat Sat l'Artificier
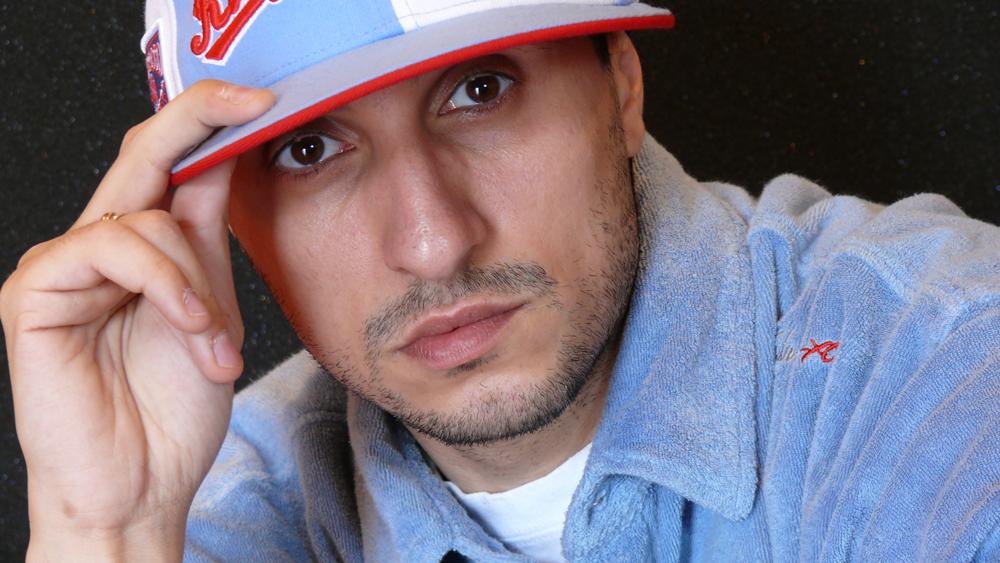
- Sat in 2007

Background information
- Born: Karim Haddouche; 16 September 1975 (age 50); Marseille, France
- Origin: Marseille, France
- Genres: Hip hop
- Occupation: Rapper
- Years active: 1994-present
- Labels: Jive/Epic Records (Sony BMG)
- Website: www.satlartificier.com

Karim Haddouche (born 16 September 1975), known as Sat l'Artificier (French pronunciation: [sat laʁtifisje]) or Sat, is a French rapper, and a member of the band Fonky Family.

== Life ==
Born in Marseille to an Algerian father and French mother of Corsican descent, Sat discovered rap at an early age. In 1993, along with his neighborhood friends Le Rat Luciano, Don Choa and Menzo, they created the band Fonky Family. After meeting with IAM's Akhenaton, they started working on their first album. Since then, the band has released 4 albums and are considered one of the biggest rap groups in France.

== Discography ==
=== Albums ===
As part of Fonky Family

- Si Dieu veut... (1998)
- Art de rue (2001)
- Marginale musique (2006)

Solo

- Dans mon monde (2002)
- Second souffle (2008)
- Diaspora (2010)

Others

- Dans mon monde (Deluxe Edition) (2003)

=== EPs ===
As part of Fonky Family

- Hors Série Vol. 1 (1999)
- Hors Série Vol. 2 (2001)

Solo

- Toujours Dans Mon Monde (EP) (2003)
