= Titoff =

French humorist and actor (born 1972)

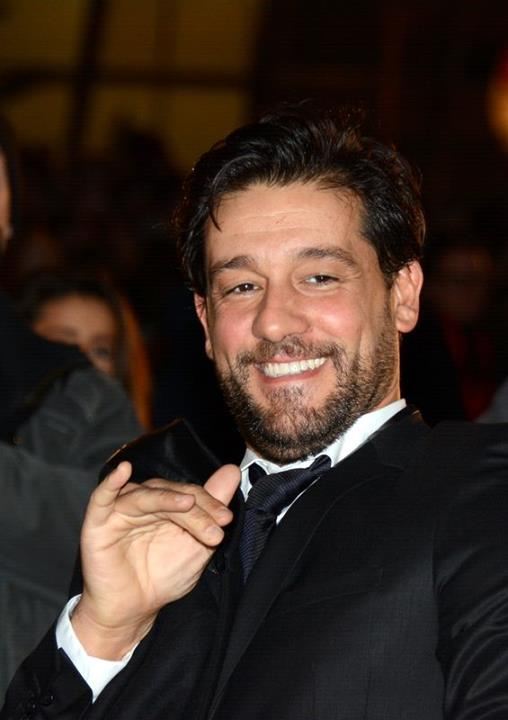
- Titoff in 2013
- Born: Christophe Junca; 18 July 1972 (age 53); Marseille, France
- Occupation: Actor
- Years active: 2000–present
- Children: 1

Titoff (born Christophe Junca; 18 July 1972) is a French humorist and actor.

== Filmography ==
Year	Title	Role	Director	Notes
2000	Comme un aimant	Santino	Akhenaton & Kamel Saleh	
2001	Pretty Things	Sébastien	Gilles Paquet-Brenner	
2003	Gomez & Tavarès	Lt. Maxime "Max" Tavarès	Gilles Paquet-Brenner	
2003	Rencontre avec le dragon	Hugues de Pertuys	Hélène Angel	
2004	L'Incruste	Paul	Alexandre Castagnetti & Corentin Julius	
2005	Cavalcade	Léo	Steve Suissa	
2005	Convivium	Quentin	Michaël Nakache	Short
2007	Gomez vs. Tavarès	Lt. Maxime "Max" Tavarès	Gilles Paquet-Brenner & Cyril Sebas	
2007	Go West! A Lucky Luke Adventure	Monsieur Pierre	Olivier Jean-Marie	
2009	Vive les vacances!	Fred	Stéphane Kappes	TV series (6 episodes)
2010	La femme du boulanger	The monk	Dominique Thiel	TV movie
2011	Zak		Arthur Benzaquen & Fabrice Laffont	TV series (1 episode)
2012-2013	Vive la colo !	Loïc	Stéphane Clavier, Dominique Ladoge, ...	TV series (12 episodes)
2012-2014	Nos chers voisins	Thomas	Emmanuel Rigaut & Denis Thybaud	TV series (2 episodes)
2015	Presque parfaites	Lionel	Gabriel Julien-Laferrière	TV series (1 episode)
2015	Josephine, Guardian Angel	Alex	Stéphane Kopecky	TV series (1 episode)

== On Stage ==
=== One Man Show ===
- 2000: Titoff à l'Olympia
- 2003: Titoff au Casino de Paris
- 2004: Titoff au Palais des Glaces
- 2007: Métrosexuel
- 2012: Déjà de retour
- 2014: 15 ans de scène

=== Theater ===
Year	Title	Author	Director
2008	Open Bed	David Serrano & Roberto Santiago	Charlotte de Turckheim
2017	Inséparables	Laurent Junca	Cyril Lecomte
2018-2019	Amoureux	Titoff & Amélie Borgese	Julien Mairesse

== Other ==
In 2013, he was a contestant during the Fourth season of Danse avec les stars.
