= Gallart =

Gallart is a Spanish surname. Notable people with the surname include:

- Guilhem Gallart, French record producer
- Philippe Gallart (born 1962), French former rugby union footballer and coach
- Ricardo Gallart (1907–1993), Spanish footballer
- Roque Gallart (born 1977), Puerto Rican broadcaster personality, and occasional actor
- Simón Moret Gallart (1853–1923), Puerto Rican politician and Mayor of Ponce
