= Parlophone =

German–British record label

Parlophone Records
- Parent company: Warner Music Group (2013–present) Previously: Carl Lindström Company (1896–1926); Columbia Graphophone Company (1926–1931); Electric and Musical Industries (EMI) (including Thorn EMI) (1931–2012); Universal Music Group (2012–2013)
- Founded: 1896; 130 years ago (as Parlophon Parlograph Company)
- Founder: Carl Lindström
- Distributors: Self-distributed; (UK/Most of Europe); Atlantic Music Group/Warner Records; (United States); Warner Music Group; (Outside the UK/Europe and the US); Rhino Entertainment Company; (Reissues); Apple Records; (The Beatles only)
- Genre: Various
- Official website: parlophonerecords.com

Parlophone Records Limited (also known as Parlophone Records and Parlophone) is a German-British record label founded in Germany in 1896 by the Carl Lindström Company as Parlophon. The British branch of the label was founded on 8 August 1923 as the Parlophone Company Limited (the Parlophone Co. Ltd.), which developed a reputation in the 1920s as a jazz record label. On 5 October 1926, the Columbia Graphophone Company acquired Parlophone's business, name, logo, and release library, and merged with the Gramophone Company on 31 March 1931 to become Electric & Musical Industries Limited (EMI). George Martin joined Parlophone in 1950 as assistant to Oscar Preuss (who had set up the London branch of the company in 1923), the label manager, taking over as manager in 1955. Martin produced and released a mix of recordings, including by comedian Peter Sellers, pianist Mrs Mills, and teen idol Adam Faith.

In 1962, Martin signed the Beatles, a beat group from Liverpool who earlier that year had been rejected by Decca Records. During the 1960s, when Cilla Black, Billy J. Kramer, the Fourmost, and the Hollies also signed, Parlophone became one of the world's most famous labels. For several years, Parlophone claimed the best-selling UK single, "She Loves You", and the best-selling UK album, Sgt. Pepper's Lonely Hearts Club Band, both by the Beatles. The label placed seven singles at number 1 during 1964, when it claimed top spot on the UK Albums Chart for 40 weeks. Parlophone continued as a division of EMI until it was merged into the Gramophone Co. on 1 July 1965. On 1 July 1973, the Gramophone Co. was renamed EMI Records Limited.

On 28 September 2012, regulators approved Universal Music Group's (UMG) planned acquisition of EMI on condition that its EMI Records group would be divested from the combined group. EMI Records Ltd included Parlophone (except the Beatles' catalogue) and other labels to be divested and were for a short time operated in a single entity known as the Parlophone Label Group (PLG), while UMG pended its sale. Warner Music Group (WMG) acquired Parlophone and [PLG] on 7 February 2013, making Parlophone its third flagship label alongside Warner Bros. and Atlantic. PLG was renamed Parlophone Records Limited in May 2013. Parlophone is the oldest of WMG's "flagship" record labels.

== History ==
=== Early years ===
Parlophone was founded as "Parlophon" by Carl Lindström Company in 1896. The name Parlophon was used for gramophones before the company began making records of their own. The label's ₤ trademark is a stylised blackletter L ($\mathfrak{L}$) that stands for Lindström. (Its resemblance to the British pound sign £ and the Italian lira sign ₤ is coincidental: both derive from the letter L used as an abbreviation for the Ancient Roman unit of measurement libra.) On 8 August 1923, the British branch of "Parlophone" (with the "e" added) was established, led by A&R manager Oscar Preuss. In its early years, Parlophone established itself as a leading jazz label in Britain.

=== EMI years and initial success ===
"Parlophon" ad from 1927, Berlin

In 1927, the Columbia Graphophone Company acquired a controlling interest in the Carl Lindström Company, including Parlophone. Parlophone became a subsidiary of Electric & Musical Industries (EMI), after Columbia Graphophone merged with the Gramophone Company in 1931.

In 1950, Oscar Preuss hired producer George Martin as his assistant. When Preuss retired in 1955, Martin succeeded him as Parlophone's manager. Parlophone specialized in mainly classical music, cast recordings, and regional British music, but Martin also expanded the reach into novelty and comedy records. One notable example is The Best of Sellers, a collection of sketches and comic songs by Peter Sellers undertaken in the guise of a variety of comic characters. It reached number three in the UK Albums Chart in 1958. Others include the albums of the comedy music double act Flanders and Swann. Musicians signed to the label included Humphrey Lyttelton and the Vipers Skiffle Group.

A consistently successful act for Parlophone was teen idol Adam Faith, who was signed to the label in 1959. The label gained significant popularity in 1962 when Martin signed Liverpool band the Beatles. Parlophone gained more attention after signing the Hollies, Ella Fitzgerald, and Gerry and the Pacemakers in the 1960s. Martin left EMI/Parlophone to form Associated Independent Recording (AIR) Studios in 1965. Norman Smith took over as Parlophone director, though EMI chairman Sir Joseph Lockwood unsuccessfully attempted to recruit Joe Meek for the job.

Parlophone became dormant (except for Beatles reissues) in 1973 when most of EMI's heritage labels were phased out in favour of EMI Records, only to be revived in 1980. The first single released on the revived label was by British group The Cheaters (Parlophone – R6041). During the next decades the label signed Pet Shop Boys, Duran Duran, Roxette, Radiohead, Supergrass, the Chemical Brothers, Blur, Coldplay, Kylie Minogue, Damon Albarn, Conor Maynard, Gabrielle Aplin, and Gorillaz.

On 23 April 2008, Miles Leonard was confirmed as the label's president.

=== Acquisition by Warner Music Group ===
On 28 September 2012, regulators approved Universal Music Group's planned acquisition of Parlophone's parent group EMI for £1.2 billion, subject to conditions imposed by the European Commission requiring that UMG sell off a number of labels, including Parlophone itself (aside from the Beatles' catalogue, which was kept by UMG and moved to Universal's newly formed Calderstone Productions), Chrysalis (aside from Robbie Williams' catalogue), Ensign, Virgin Classics, EMI Classics, worldwide rights to Roulette Records (and its sublabels), and EMI's operations in Portugal, Spain, France, Belgium, Denmark, Norway, Sweden, Czech Republic, Slovakia, and Poland. These labels and catalogues were operated independently from Universal as Parlophone Label Group until a buyer was found. UMG received several offers for PLG, including those from Island founder Chris Blackwell, Simon Fuller, a Sony/BMG consortium, Warner Music Group, and MacAndrews & Forbes.

On 7 February 2013, it was confirmed that Warner Music Group would acquire Parlophone Label Group for US$765 million. The deal was approved in May 2013 by the European Union, which saw no concerns about the deal because of WMG's smaller reach compared to the merged UMG and Sony. Warner Music closed the deal on 1 July. Parlophone Label Group was the old EMI Records label that included both the Parlophone and the eponymous EMI labels. The EMI trademark was retained by Universal (as Virgin EMI Records) while the "old" EMI Records became defunct and was renamed "Parlophone Records Ltd."

Soon after acquiring Parlophone, WMG signed an agreement with IMPALA and the Merlin Network (two groups which opposed the EMI/Universal deal) to divest $200 million worth of catalogues to independent labels in order to help offset the consolidation triggered by the merger. In April 2016, the back catalogue of British rock band Radiohead, who had sued Parlophone and EMI over a dispute in music royalties, was transferred to XL Recordings.

WMG treats Parlophone as its third "frontline" label group alongside Atlantic and Warner. In the US, most of Parlophone's artists are now distributed under Warner Records except Dinosaur Pile-Up, distributed by 300 Elektra Entertainment's Roadrunner Records, Coldplay and Tinie Tempah, both distributed by Atlantic Records, and David Guetta, distributed by Atlantic's electronic music imprint Big Beat Records.

== Roster ==
Parlophone's roster includes many popular music artists. Its contemporary His Master's Voice was more of a classical music label and mostly ceased issuing popular music recordings in 1967; later replaced by EMI Classics, which was absorbed into Warner Classics in 2013; English Columbia was replaced by the EMI pop label. Parlophone also operates Regal, a contemporary revival of the historic Columbia Graphophone budget/reissue label founded in 1914. The list records those who achieved notability.

=== The Beatles ===
The Beatles' albums in the U.K. up to Sgt. Pepper's Lonely Hearts Club Band were issued on the Parlophone label. Subsequent releases – The Beatles (also known as the "White Album"), Yellow Submarine, Abbey Road and Let It Be – were issued on the Beatles' own Apple record label, manufactured and distributed by EMI and bearing Parlophone catalogue numbers.

On 6 June 1962, producer George Martin signed the Beatles to Parlophone, in turn, making the Beatles' deal one of the cheapest by Parlophone. Despite the separation of Parlophone from EMI as a condition of EMI's acquisition by UMG, Universal was allowed to keep the Beatles' recorded music catalogue, which is now managed by the subsidiary Calderstone Productions.

== Gallery of Parlophone record labels ==
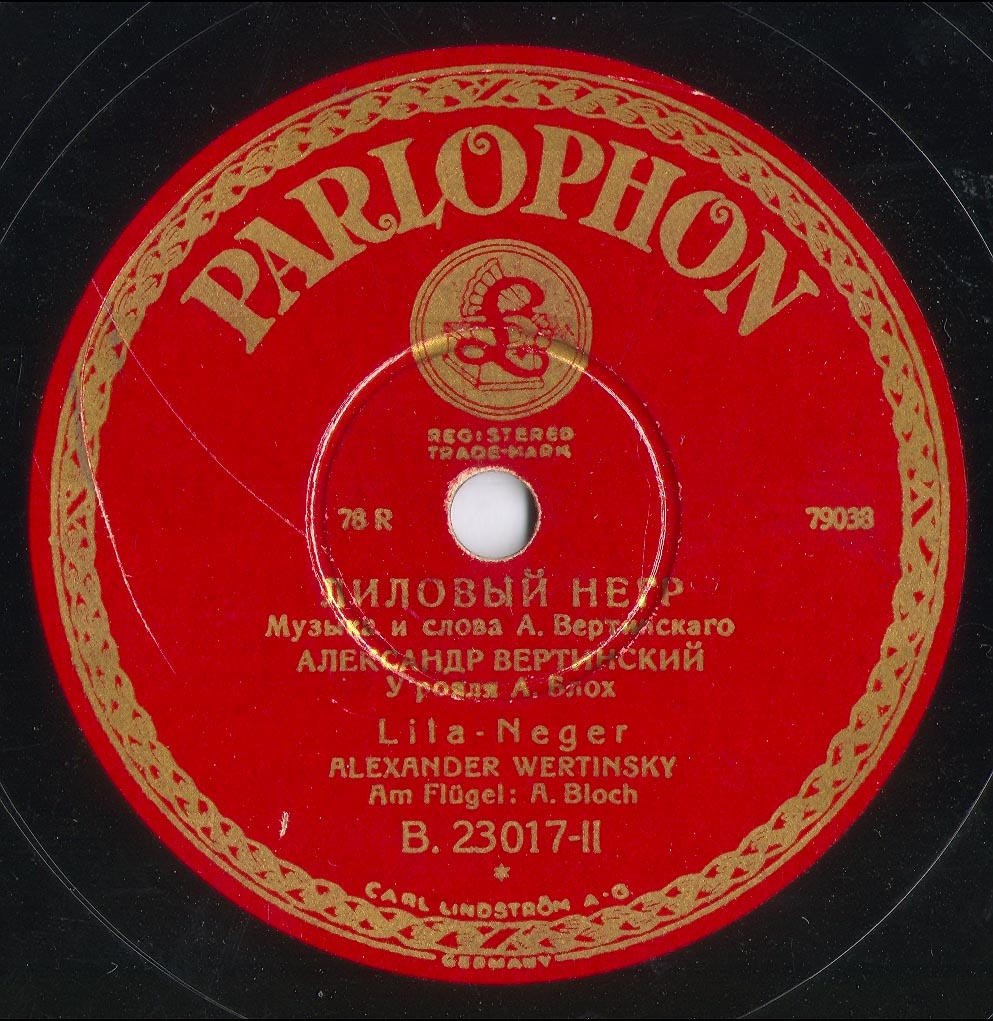
Vertinsky Parlophone B.23017, made in Germany

Early 20th-century Parlophone record label of the 78 rpm acoustic era

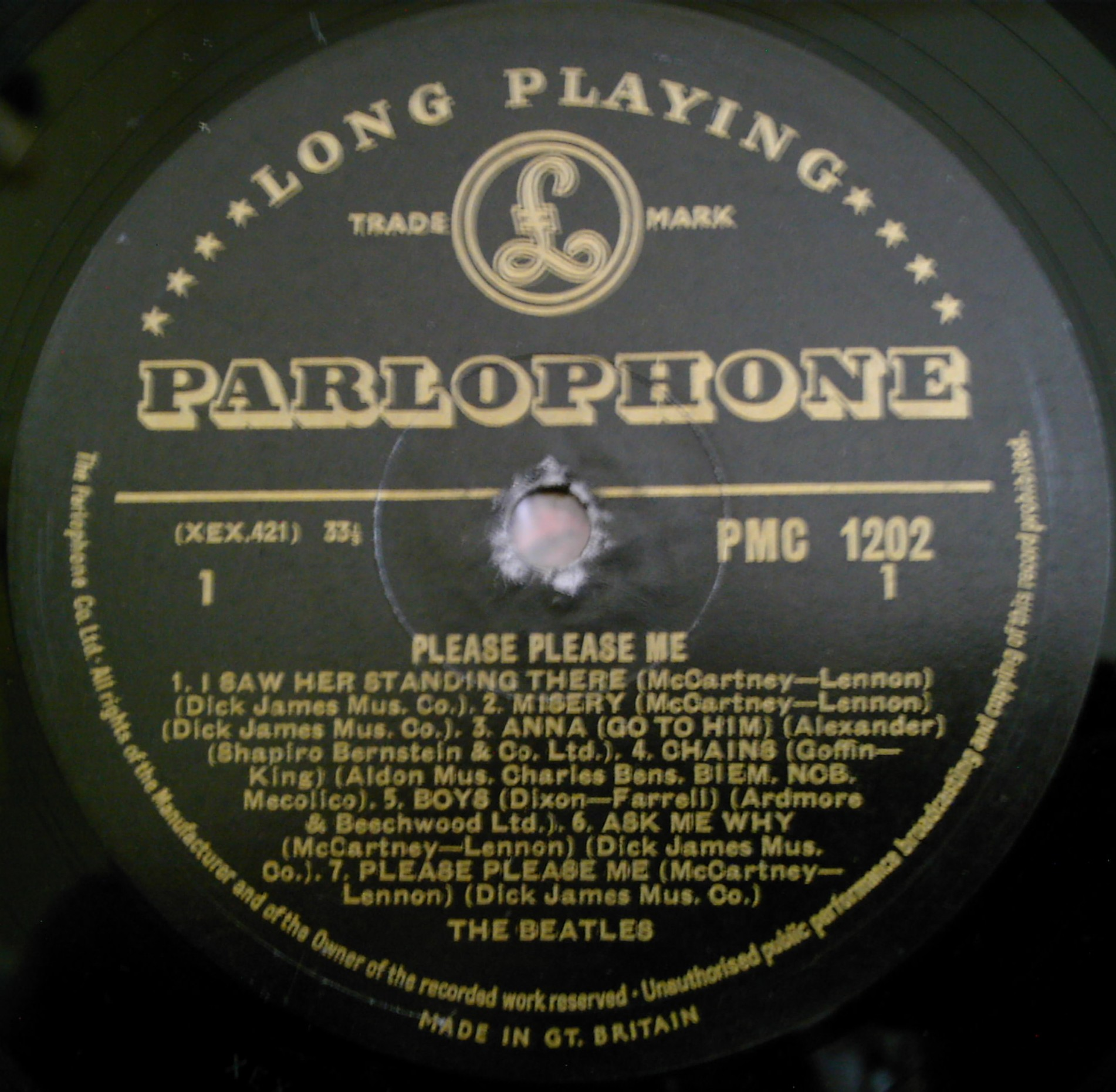
Please Please Me by the Beatles (side 1) – 1963. Parlophone gold and black label

With the Beatles (side 1) – Parlophone yellow and black label

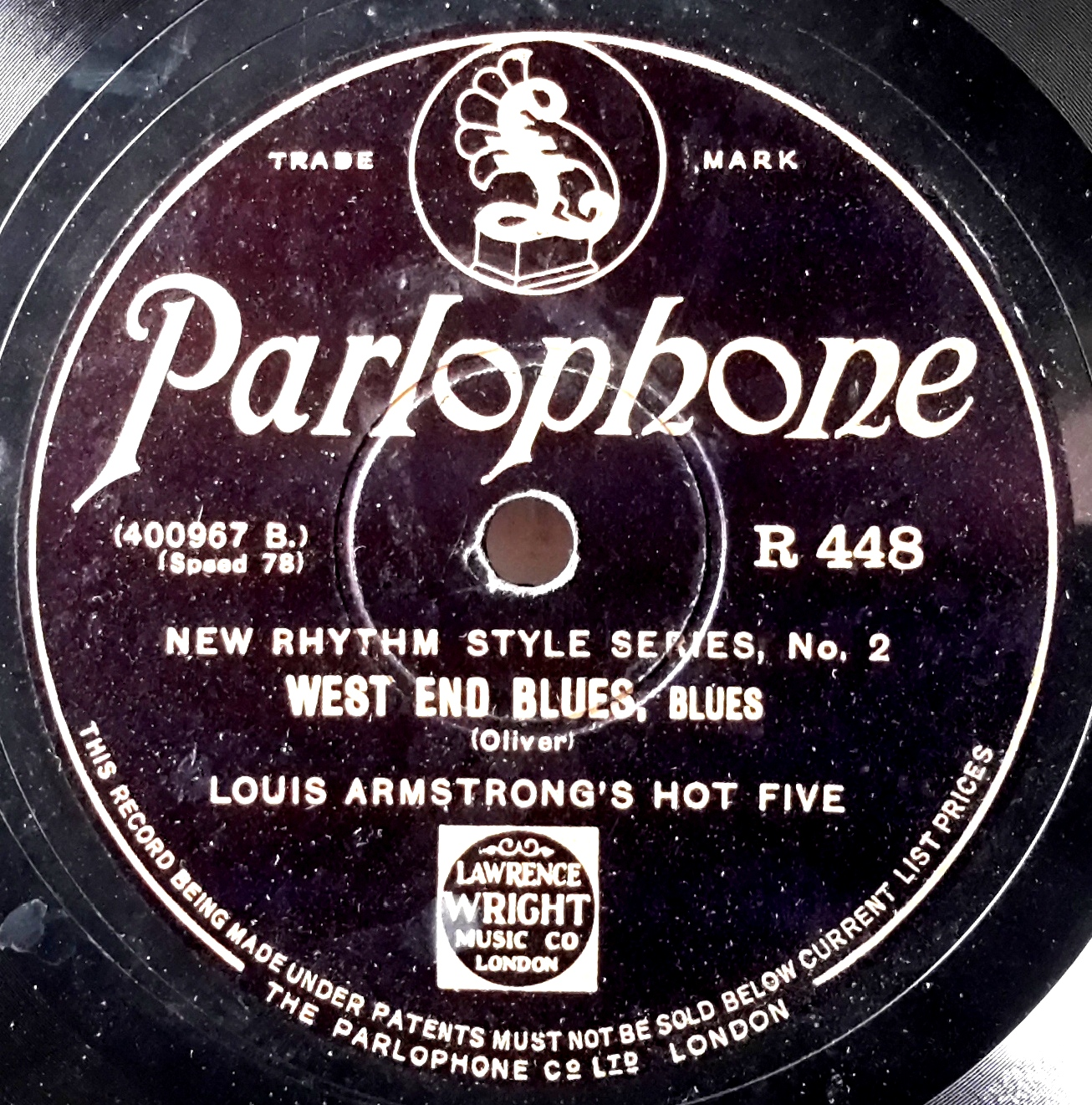
West End Blues, British Parlophone record

The labels shown here include those used for 78s and LPs. The label design for 7-inch singles had the same standard template as several other EMI labels, with the large "45" insignia to the right. In recent years, design uniformity has relaxed from release to release.
