= Steinway Vertegrand =

Upright piano

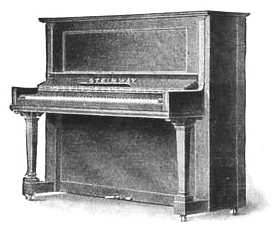
- Sketch from a 1907 advertisement for the Steinway Vertegrand
- Other names: Model K
- Inventor(s): Henry Ziegler
- Developed: 1903

Related instruments
- Upright piano

Builders
- Steinway & Sons

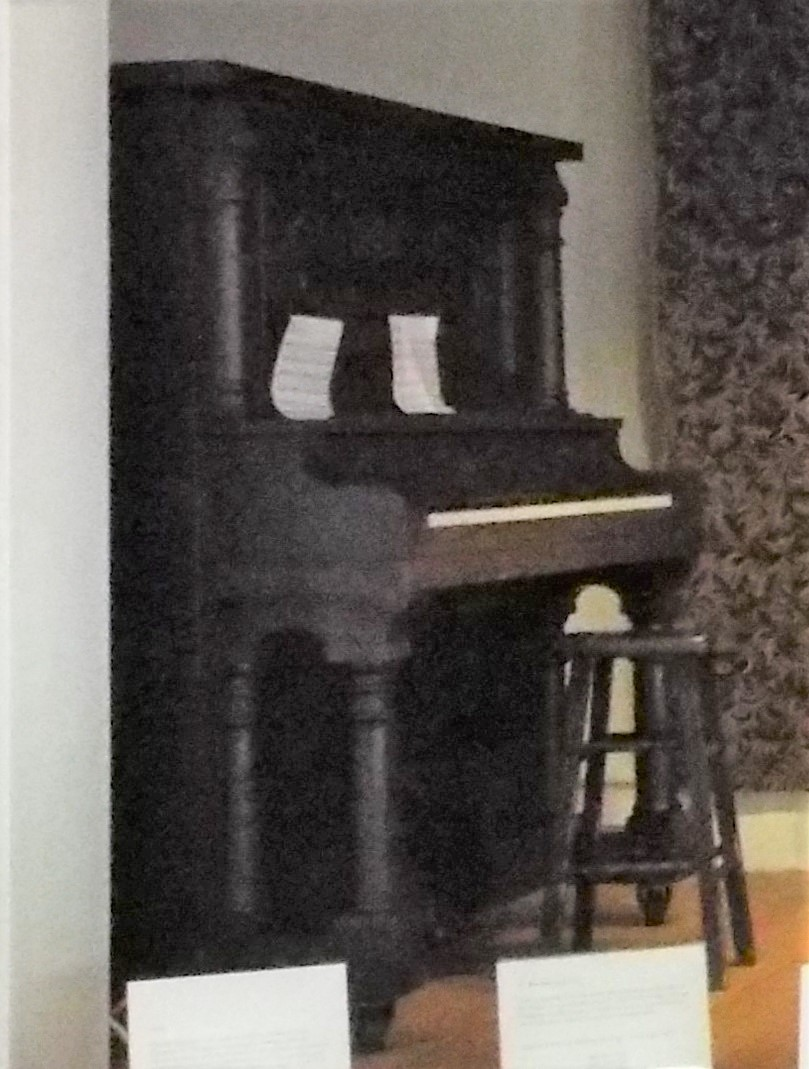
1913 Steinway Model K once used in the historic Tubac Schoolhouse in Arizona

The Model K or "Vertegrand" is an upright piano introduced in 1903 by Steinway & Sons. It is the oldest essentially unchanged upright piano design currently in mass production. Although production was interrupted from about 1939 until its reappearance in 1982, the structural design has remained essentially the same for well over a century.

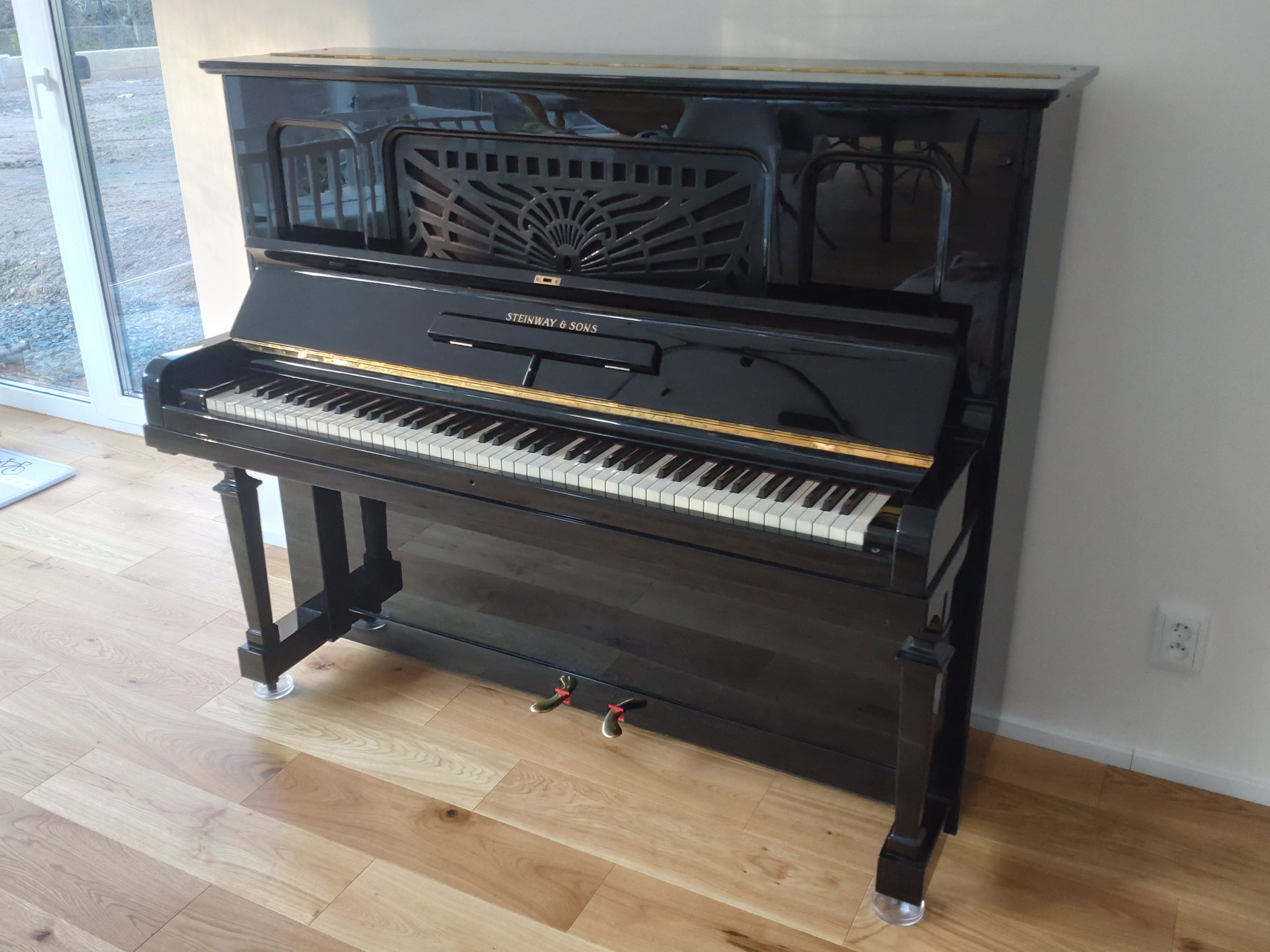
1922 Steinway Vertegrand

Notable Vertegrands include a vintage 1905 piano named in honor of British pianist Mrs Mills, which has remained in use at Abbey Road Studios for over 60 years. Its characteristic out-of-tune honky-tonk sound appears on numerous Abbey Road recordings, including some by The Beatles.

== Production history ==
=== Model K (1903–1943) ===
The Steinway Vertegrand, also known as the Model K, was designed by Steinway director Henry Ziegler and introduced in 1903 at a cost of $500, equivalent to $17,498 in 2024. The name "Vertegrand" displayed along the top of the iron frame reflected the instrument's size relative to Steinway's then-current lineup; at 52 inches (132 cm), it was smaller than the 54.3-inch (138 cm) "Upright Grand" scale (Model I in New York; Model R in Hamburg) introduced in 1894, but larger than the 49-inch (125 cm) scale that would later become the Model V.

A 1910 advertisement in the New-York Tribune described the piano as "the embodiment of scientific research and musical progress of the Twentieth Century." Gustav Mahler said that he "never imagined that an upright piano could be constructed which would satisfy a musician's requirements in every respect."

The American Model K was discontinued in the wake of the Great Depression in 1930, but the Hamburg factory continued making the model, although by the 1930s the term "Vertegrand" had disappeared from the casting of the iron frames of the Hamburg pianos and was replaced by the hand-painted comment Erzeugnis der Steinway-Werke Hamburg-Altona, which translates to "Product of the Steinway Factory in Hamburg-Altona." Production continued in Hamburg until the Hamburg Steinway factory was seized for war-related production around the time of the Allied firebombing in 1943, which destroyed all of the factory's records. (Note: Production of grand and upright pianos continued in Hamburg until the factory was seized in 1943 for use in war materials production by the company Vereinigten Deutschen Metallwarenwerke. Piano production in Hamburg was resumed by permission of the British occupying forces in 1948; however, the Vertegrand was not produced again in Hamburg until its reintroduction in 1982. See Büttner, 1996.)

=== Model K-52 and Model K-132 (1982–) ===
The Model K reappeared in 1982 as the Model K-52, occupying the top of Steinway's vertical piano offering. The Hamburg factory followed with the similar Model K-132. Although the modern Model K pianos have essentially the same dimensions and string scale of the original, the "Vertegrand" nomenclature was not retained.

William Theodore Steinway was in charge of the 1982 re-design, by which time the original plans had been lost and had to be re-created by dissecting an older Model K belonging to Steinway staff engineer John Boygos. The only changes from the original 1903 design were those that had been implemented since 1930, including the Diaphragmatic Soundboard, Accelerated Action, and Hexagrip Wrestplank (pinblock), as well as a slightly modified stringing schedule.

== Mrs Mills at Abbey Road ==
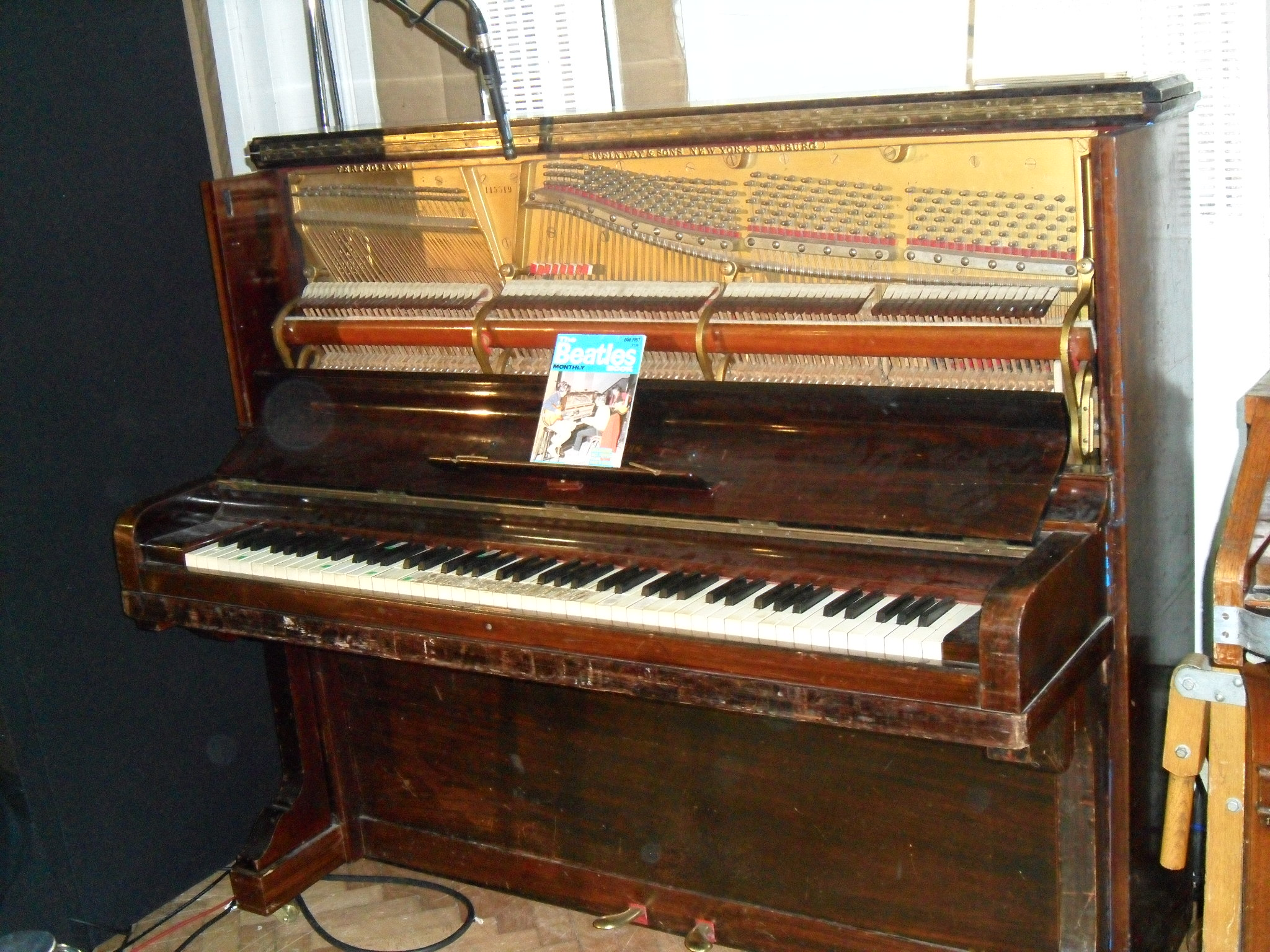
The 1905 Vertegrand piano at Abbey Road Studios, named Mrs Mills after the British pianist who played it in the 1960s and 1970s

A particularly notable Vertegrand is owned by Abbey Road Studios in London. It was frequently played by Mrs Mills, and as such became known as the "Mrs Mills" piano.

Abbey Road purchased the 1905 piano in 1953 for £404, equivalent to £14,248 in 2023. Engineer Stuart Eltham had a Steinway technician modify the piano to create an "older" sound; the hammers were treated with lacquer to harden them to emulate the bright sound of a tack piano. The piano is kept slightly de-tuned to further the old-time bar-room tone; as all but the lowest keys on the piano have more than one string, subtly detuning one of the strings per key gives a chorus effect.

This piano was used by the Beatles in the recording of songs such as "Lady Madonna", "She's a Woman", "I Want to Tell You" and "Penny Lane". In addition, the band used it over the middle section of "Rocky Raccoon" and in the introductions to "With a Little Help from My Friends" and "Ob-La-Di, Ob-La-Da".

Dhani Harrison, son of Beatle George Harrison, recorded the soundtrack to the 2013 film Beautiful Creatures at Abbey Road with his band, thenewno2. Noting the band's excitement about the prospect of using the piano, he said, "If you could see [the] piano's discography, it would put most artists to shame... This one piano, this poor little piano, has been on everything. And they just leave her in the corner. She's just sitting there in the corner. So when we got there, we were like, 'Mrs. Mills!'"

On March 25, 2021, Spitfire Audio released an audio plugin (VST) of the piano.
