= Revoir un printemps =

Revoir un Printemps

Studio album by IAM
- Released: September 15, 2003
- Studio: Studios Zgen (Avignon, France); Studio La Cosca (Marseille, France); Sony Music Studios (New York, U.S.); Electric Lady Studios (New York, U.S.); Студио 1 на Българско национално радио; Studio Claudia Sound (Aubervilliers, France)
- Genre: French hip hop
- Length: 1:19:50
- Label: Delabel; Hostile Records; EMI
- Producer: Akhenaton; Al-Khemya; Shurik'n; Imhotep; DJ Khéops; Bruno Coulais

IAM chronology
L'École du micro d'argent (1997)	Revoir un Printemps (2003)	Saison 5 (2007)

Singles from Revoir un printemps
- 1. "Noble Art" Released: 25 November 2003; 2. "Revoir un printemps" Released: 2004; 3. "Nous" Released: 2004; 4. "Stratégie d'un pion" Released: 2004

Professional ratings
Review scores
Source	Rating
laut.de	4/5 stars
Voir	3.5/5 stars

Revoir un Printemps is a studio album by French hip hop group IAM. It was released on 15 September 2003 through Hostile Records with distribution via EMI. Recording sessions took place at Studios Zgen in Avignon, at Studio La Cosca in Marseille, at Sony Music Studios and at Electric Lady Studios in New York, at Bulgarian National Radio Studio 1, and at Studio Claudia Sound in Aubervilliers. Production was handled by Akhenaton, Al-Khemya, Shurik'n, Imhotep, DJ Khéops and Bruno Coulais. It features guest appearances from Beyoncé, Kayna Samet, Method Man & Redman, Syleena Johnson and Bulgarian Symphony Orchestra.

The album peaked atop of French and Wallionian charts and also peaked at number 2 in Swiss Hitparade. It spawned four charted singles: "Noble Art", "Revoir un printemps", "Nous" and "Stratégie d'un pion". The album was certified Gold by both International Federation of the Phonographic Industry Switzerland and Syndicat National de l'Édition Phonographique.

== Track listing ==
No.	Title	Writer(s)	Producer(s)	Length
1.	"Stratégie d'un pion"	Philippe Fragione; Geoffroy Mussard; Abdel Malek Brahimi	Akhenaton; Al-Khemya	4:35
2.	"Nous" (featuring Kayna Samet)	Fragione; Mussard; Kayna Samet	Shurik'n	4:37
3.	"Quand ils rentraient chez eux"	Fragione; Mussard; Brahimi	Akhenaton; Al-Khemya	4:17
4.	"Noble Art" (featuring Method Man & Redman)	Fragione; Mussard; Brahimi; Clifford Smith; Reggie Noble	Akhenaton; Al-Khemya	4:56
5.	"Lâches"	Fragione; Mussard; Brahimi	Shurik'n	4:38
6.	"Mental de Viêt-Cong"	Fragione; Mussard	Akhenaton; Shurik'n	4:23
7.	"Revoir un printemps"	Fragione; Mussard; Brahimi	Akhenaton; Al-Khemya	3:53
8.	"Armes de Distraction Massive"	Fragione; Mussard; Brahimi	Shurik'n	4:14
9.	"Second Souffle"	Fragione; Mussard; Brahimi	DJ Khéops	5:01
10.	"Visages Dans la Foule"	Fragione; Mussard; Brahimi	Shurik'n	3:57
11.	"Ici Ou Ailleurs" (featuring Syleena Johnson)	Fragione; Mussard; Brahimi; Syleena Johnson	Akhenaton; Al-Khemya	4:33
12.	"Tiens"	Fragione; Mussard; Brahimi	Imhotep	4:18
13.	"Bienvenue" (featuring Beyoncé)	Fragione; Mussard; Deni Hines	Akhenaton; Al-Khemya	4:05
14.	"Pause"	Fragione; Mussard; Brahimi	Imhotep	4:20
15.	"Fruits de la Rage"	Fragione; Mussard	Akhenaton; Al-Khemya	4:01
16.	"Murs"	Fragione; Mussard; Brahimi	Akhenaton; Al-Khemya	4:49
17.	"21/04"	Fragione; Mussard; Brahimi	Akhenaton; Al-Khemya	4:50
18.	"Aussi Loin Que l'Horizon"	Fragione; Mussard; Brahimi	Akhenaton; Al-Khemya	4:23
19.	"Live de la Base"	Fragione; Mussard; Brahimi	Akhenaton; Al-Khemya
Total length:				1:19:50

== Personnel ==
- Philippe "Akhenaton" Fragione – main artist, composer & producer (tracks: 1, 3, 4, 6, 7, 11, 13, 15–19), arranger (track 9)
- Geoffroy "Shurik'n" Mussard – main artist, composer & producer (tracks: 2, 5, 6, 8, 10)
- Éric "Khéops" Mazel – main artist, scratches, composer & producer (track 9), arranger (tracks: 4, 6, 8, 9, 12, 14, 16–19)
- Malek "Freeman" Brahimi – main artist
- Pascal "Imhotep" Perez – main artist, composer & producer (tracks: 12, 14), arranger (track 8)
- Kayna Samet – featured artist (track 2)
- Clifford "Method Man" Smith – featured artist (track 4)
- Reginald "Redman" Noble – featured artist (track 4)
- Syleena Johnson – featured artist (track 11)
- Beyoncé Knowles – featured artist (track 13)
- Michael Robinson – vocals (track 15)
- André Charles "Slim" Pezin – acoustic guitar, electric guitar, steel guitar, dobro, bass
- Raoul Duflot-Verez – piano
- Michel Peyratout – bass
- Patrick Bourgoin – alto saxophone, flute
- Mostafa Benhmad – pipe, violin
- Bernard Camoin – trombone
- Eric Giausserand – trumpet
- Marc Chantereau – percussion
- Bulgarian Symphony Orchestra – orchestra
- Deyan Pavlov – conductor
- Bruno Coulais – orchestrations producer, arranger (tracks: 2, 6, 7, 10–13, 16, 18)
- Philippe Amir – recording, assistant engineering
- Eric Chevet – recording, mixing
- Nabil Ghrib – recording
- Michael Tocci – recording (tracks: 4, 11)
- Maxime Lefèvre – recording
- Didier Lizé – recording
- Chris Gehringer – mastering
- Steef Van De Gevel – assistant engineering
- Haythem "H.Boogie" Bouchuiguir – recording coordinator (track 4)
- Kankre Attak – design, photography
- Tous Des K – design, photography

== Charts ==
=== Weekly charts ===
Weekly chart performance for Revoir un printemps
Chart (2003)	Peak position
Belgian Albums (Ultratop Wallonia)	1
French Albums (SNEP)	1
Swiss Albums (Schweizer Hitparade)	2

=== Year-end charts ===
Year-end chart performance for Revoir un printemps
Chart (2003)	Position
Belgian Albums (Ultratop Wallonia)	18
French Albums (SNEP)	46
Swiss Albums (Schweizer Hitparade)	51

== Certifications and sales ==
Region	Certification	Certified units/sales
France (SNEP)	Gold	100,000^{*}
Switzerland (IFPI Switzerland)	Gold	20,000^{^}
^{*} Sales figures based on certification alone.^{^} Shipments figures based on certification alone.
