= Art de rue =

Studio album by Fonky Family
- Released: 2001
- Genre: French hip hop
- Length: 69:00
- Label: Small, Jive-Epic
- Producer: Pone, Le Rat Luciano, DJ Djel

Art de rue is the second album by the French hip hop group Fonky Family. It was released in March 2001 and received gold certification in France.

Most titles were produced by Pone, as well as by Le Rat Luciano. Among the most prominent titles are: Mystère et suspense (produced from a sample of I Won't Hold You Back by Toto), a piece that evokes the reality of everyday life and the uncertain future of each, Art de rue (produced from a sample of Somebody's Watching Me by Rockwell) and Dans la légende, that evokes the harshness of power.

== Track listing ==
No.	Title	Length
1.	"Art de rue"	5:12
2.	"Les miens m'ont dit"	2:26
3.	"Imagine"	4:11
4.	"Mystère et Suspense"	5:31
5.	"Nique tout"	5:03
6.	"Petit bordel"	2:44
7.	"Entre deux feux"	3:53
8.	"Djel & Pone"	1:51
9.	"Filles, flics, descentes"	4:00
10.	"Tonight"	4:32
11.	"Histoire sans fin"	4:53
12.	"On s'adapte"	3:26
13.	"Haute Tension"	4:44
14.	"Dans la légende"	4:07
15.	"On respecte ça"	4:12
16.	"Check I,I,I"	2:20
17.	"Esprit de clan"	6:30

== Charts ==
Chart	Peak position
France	2
Belgium	2
Switzerland	26
