= Faf Larage =

French rapper

- Also known as: Raff Rage
- Born: Raphaël Mussard; 6 March 1971 (age 54); Marseille, Bouches-du-Rhône, Provence, France
- Genres: Hip-hop
- Occupations: Rapper; singer

Raphaël Mussard (French pronunciation: [ʁafaɛl mysaʁ]; born 6 March 1971), better known by his stage name Faf Larage (pronounced [faf laʁaʒ]), is a French rapper of Malagasy and Reunionese origins.

== Biography ==
Raphaël Mussard was born in Marseille, Bouches-du-Rhône. He made his debut in the group "Soul Swing And Radikal" under the pseudonym "Raff Rage". In 1998 he released a solo album titled C'est ma Cause. His brother Shurik'n is a member of rap group IAM. Together they released an album called La Garde in 2000. In 2003, along with Eben (2Neg) and under the pseudonym of "Gomez & Dubois", he released the album Cops and off-the-law parodying the world's policemen. The album received an award in France in 2004 for best rap album.

In 2006 he performed the theme song for the French version of the TV series Prison Break, which reached the top spot in the French Top 50.

== Albums ==
- 1999: C'est Ma cause
- 1999: Le Pack Ego Trip: Hip Hop Non Stop ... 2000 (EP)
- 2000: La Garde (along with Shurik'n)
- 2003: Flic$ & Hor$ La Loi (along with avec Eben)
- 2007: Rap Stories (Singles: Pas le temps, Ta Meuf (La Caille), C'est De L'Or (with Taïro), C'est pas ma faute)

== Appearances ==
=== 1997 ===
- Faf Larage - Le Fainéant
- Faf Larage - Hip-Hop Marseillais
- Faf Larage Feat Shurik'n - La Garde meurt mais ne se rend pas

=== 1998 ===
- Faf Larage Feat New African Poets (NAP) - 5 ans de répis
- Faf Larage - Ils deviennent ce qu'ils voient
- Faf Larage Feat Akhenaton, 3e Oeil, Mc Arabica & Fonky Family - Le Retour du Shit Squad sur la compile Chroniques de Mars Vol.1
- Faf Larage - La cavale
- Faf Larage - Hip-Hop Protagonist
- Shurik'n Feat Faf Larage - Le destin n'a pas de roi
- Shurik'n Feat Faf Larage - Esprit anesthésié sur l'album de Shurik'n, Où je vis
- Shurik'n Feat Faf Larage - Mon clan sur l'album de Shurik'n, Où je vis

=== 1999 ===
- Faf Larage - Méchante soirée
- Faf Larage - C'est notre hip-hop

=== 2000 ===
- Faf Larage Feat Taïro - Mea Culpa
- Faf Larage Feat. Prodigal Sunn & Dreddy Krueger - Saga 2000

=== 2002 ===
- Faf Larage - T'es ombré sur la compile Liberté d'expression Vol.3

=== 2003 ===
- Faf Larage Feat IAM - Le Couteau entre les dents
- Faf Larage Feat IAM, K'Rhyme Le Roi & Def Bond - History
- Faf Larage Feat Nach, La voz de los grandes - Poesia difusa

=== 2004 ===
- Faf Larage Feat Akhenaton - L'Américain sur la B.O. du film L'américain
- Faf Larage Feat Habib Bamogo - Mars dans la peau sur la compile OM All Stars
- IPM Feat Faf Larage - Les sales potes sur l'album d'IPM, 1 pied dans le biz
- Rival Feat Faf Larage - Underground City sur la compile Bastard Academy
- Faf Larage- Mr Claude dans le jeu Hitman: Contracts, dans la dernière mission, dans la chambre d'un camé.

=== 2006 ===
- Faf Larage Feat Akhenaton & Veust Lyricist - Commode le dégueulasse
- Faf Larage - Pas le temps sur la B.O. de la série Prison Break

=== 2007 ===
- Faf Larage Feat Arno - I'm not into hope
- Faf Larage - Mefi sur la mixtape d'IAM, Official Mixtape
- Faf Larage Feat Taïro - C'est De L'Or
- Faf Larage - M. le Juge sur la compile Chroniques de Mars Vol.2
- Faf Larage - C'est pas ma faute

=== 2009 ===
- Faf Larage Feat Magic System et Najim - Neuilly sa Mère sur la B.O. du film Neuilly-sa-Mère.
- Faf Larage Feat Def Bond - Shining Star sur l'album de Def Bond - LOVE
