= L'Incruste =

- Theatrical release poster
- Directed by: Alexandre Castagnetti; Corentin Julius
- Written by: Alexandre Castagnetti; Corentin Julius
- Produced by: Christian Fechner
- Starring: Titoff; Frédéric Diefenthal
- Cinematography: Laurent Machuel
- Edited by: Sylvie Gadmer
- Music by: Jérôme Germond; Clément Marchand
- Production companies: Les Films Christian Fechner; France 2 Cinéma; Zagzig Productions
- Distributed by: Warner Bros. Pictures
- Release date: 31 March 2004
- Running time: 95 minutes
- Country: France
- Language: French
- Budget: €7.7 million
- Box office: $2.6 million

L'Incruste, fallait pas le laisser entrer ! (lit. 'The Squatter: You shouldn't have let him in!') is a 2004 French comedy film written and directed by Alexandre Castagnetti and Corentin Julius. It stars Frédéric Diefenthal and Titoff.

The film was released on 31 March 2004 by Warner Bros. Pictures. It drew around 402,437 admissions in France.

== Cast ==
- Frédéric Diefenthal as Alexandre
- Titoff as Paul
- Zoé Félix as Cécilia
- Agnès Soral as Josiane
- Zinedine Soualem as Mickey
- Féodor Atkine as Alexandre's father
- Patrick Mille as Christophe
- Philippe Maymat as Zoran
- Sacha Bourdo as Marco
- Brigitte Bémol as Céline
