= Guilhem Gallart =

French record producer

- Also known as: Pone
- Born: Toulouse, France
- Years active: 1994–present

Guilhem Gallart, known professionally as Pone, is a French record producer. He was a member of the band Fonky Family.

== Early life ==
Born in Toulouse, he left at 19 for Marseille.

== Music ==
=== Fonky Family ===
In 1994, he co-created the Fonky Family band, and would produce the entirety of the group's first album which released in 1997. He was also as an independent producer for other artists including Sat l'Artificier. The Fonky Family disbanded in 2007.

=== Independent career in music ===
In 2015, it was revealed that Gallart suffered from amyotrophic lateral sclerosis. In 2018, in response to the lack of public information about the disease, Gallart published a book titled ALS for Dummies.

At the start of 2019, Gallart continued musical production despite his paralysis. This included the release of albums including Vision in 2020 with members of Mafia K-1 Fry and Kate & Me.

In 2022, comedian Marc-Antoine Le Bret gave his voice to Gallart which allowed him to speak with a synthetic voice. This was made into a short documentary by Brux.
