= Cunnie Williams =

American R&B singer (1963–2024)

- Born: March 17, 1963; Los Angeles, California, U.S.
- Died: August 2024 (aged 61)
- Genres: R&B
- Occupation: Singer
- Years active: 1994–2024
- Labels: Peppermint Jam, Universal Music Group

Cunnie Williams (March 17, 1963 – August 2024) was an American R&B singer whose voice has been compared to Barry White.

== Biography ==
Williams was born in Los Angeles on March 17, 1963. After playing basketball, he switched to a career in music with his debut album Comin' from the Heart of the Ghetto. His hits have included the single "Saturday" which charted in Italy, the song "Come Back to Me" which charted in France, and the album Night Time in Paris which charted in France. Williams' song "Life Goes On" is on the soundtrack of the movie The Magnet.

Williams died in August 2024, at the age of 61.

== Discography ==
=== Albums ===
- 1995: Comin' from the Heart of the Ghetto
- 1996: Love Starved Heart
- 1999: Star Hotel
- 2002: Night Time in Paris
- 2004: Inside My Soul
- 2008: No Place Like Home

=== Singles ===
Year	Single	Peak chart positions			Album
Year	Single	FRA	BEL (WAL)	ITA	Album
1994	"The World Keeps Fallin'" (GER only)	—	—	—	Comin' From The Heart Of The Ghetto
1994	"Suddenly It's Magic" (GER only)	—	—	—	Comin' From The Heart Of The Ghetto
1996	"Take You Higher"	—	—	—	Love Starved Heart
1999	"Saturday" (feat. Monie Love)	35	—	24	Star Hotel
1999	"A World Celebration" (feat. Heavy D)	87	—	49	Star Hotel
2000	"Spirit"	—	—	—	Star Hotel
2000	"With Or Without You" (FRA only)	—	—	—	Star Hotel
2000	"Life Goes On"	61	—	—	Comme un aimant Soundtrack
2002	"Come Back to Me"	14	15	—	Night Time In Paris
2002	"War Song" (FRA only)	57	—	—	Night Time In Paris
2003	"Everything I Do" (FRA only)	—	—	—	Night Time In Paris
2004	"Superstar" (FRA only)	51	—	—	Inside My Soul
2009	"Saturday (2009 Remixes)" (GER/ITA only)	—	—	—	single only
"—" denotes releases that did not chart or were not released.
