= Rencontre avec le dragon =

- Theatrical poster
- Directed by: Hélène Angel
- Written by: Hélène Angel; Jean-Claude Janer; Agnès de Sacy
- Produced by: Michel Saint-Jean
- Starring: Daniel Auteuil; Nicolas Nollet
- Cinematography: Benoît Delhomme
- Edited by: Pauline Dairou
- Music by: Philippe Miller
- Production company: Studio 24
- Distributed by: Diaphana Films
- Release date: August 6, 2003
- Running time: 109 minutes
- Country: France
- Language: French
- Budget: 9,76 million €

Rencontre avec le dragon (also known as The Red Knight) is a French film directed by Hélène Angel.

== Plot ==
Guillaume travels with his friend Raoul de Vautadour who has a sinister secret: Every night he turns into a beast.
The little boy Felix, a great admirer, manages to come along with the both of them. In the beginning he is very happy about that. Yet eventually he realises the difference between legend and reality. Guillaume's poverty is not romantic but simply the sparse life of an outsider who has no alternative. His doings are not on a stringent crusade but a desperate search for purpose.
Finally Felix understands that Guillaume is not to be envied.

== Cast ==
- Daniel Auteuil as Guillaume de Montauban
- Nicolas Nollet as Félix de Sisteron
- Sergi Lópezas Raoul de Ventadour
- Emmanuelle Devos as Gisela von Bingen
- Titoff as Hugues de Pertuys
- Gilbert Melki as Micholas Mespoulède
- Maurice Garrel as the Duke of Belzince
- Claude Perron as Isabelle de Ventadour
- Frédéric Proustas Baron Léon de Courtenay
- Bernard Blancan as Guillaume's sergeant
