= Steinway Upright Grand =

Piano model

The Model I/Model R or "Upright Grand" was the largest upright piano made by Steinway & Sons in the 20th Century.

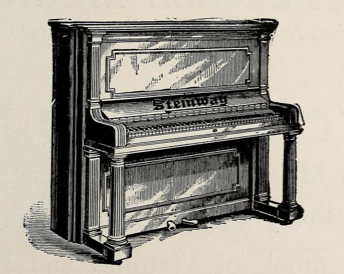
Sketch from a 1915 advert of a Steinway Model I

== History ==
Steinway New York introduced the "Upright Grand" scale design in 1894 with the 54.7" Model I, replacing the "Cabinet Grand" series consisting of the slightly smaller Model F and the slightly larger Model G. Steinway Hamburg followed in 1897 with the nearly identical 138-centimeter Model R. In North America, the Model I competed with similarly sized premium uprights such as the Mason and Hamlin Model O. The Model I ceased production in 1929 with the onset of the Great Depression. The Hamburg factory continued production of the Model R until 1943. Unlike the revived Model K52 and K132, Steinway never resumed production of the Model I or Model R, leaving the Steingraeber 138 as the sole upright piano of this class currently in production.

== Design ==
The 1901 Steinway New York catalogue states the following for the "Style I [Model I]":

"Upright Grand--Very handsome case, two solid Doric columns, united by stretcher to corresponding pilasters, support the keyboard. Top supported by similar pilasters. Moulding on upper edge of frame front and sides. One upper and one lower front panel. The Patented Cupola Steel Frame is constructed on the principle of our Grand Pianos, with Capo-d'Astro Bar cast integrally. Height, 4 feet 6 3/4 inches; depth, 2 feet 5 inches; width, 5 feet 2 inches. Net weight, 695 lbs. Gross weight, 1015 lbs. 881/2 cubic feet, boxed."

The Model I and Model R are clearly identifiable by the presence of a capo d'astro bar bearing the lettering "UPRIGHT GRAND STRING FRAME CAPO D'ASTRO BAR" spanning from immediately after the bass section at note 27 through note 88 (the only other Steinway upright with a capo bar, the smaller Model N, spanned only from notes 54-88 and bore only the CAPO D'ASTRO BAR lettering). Another distinguishing feature is the fact that the soundboard is not merely tall but also significantly wider than its standard 88-note keyboard. Externally, this means that the case is noticeably layered. Internally, this means that access to the #1 tuning pin requires a carved-out portion in the surrounding case. The string length is comparable to that of a Steinway Model O grand piano.

== The Titanic Model Rs ==
As with Steinway's grand pianos, Upright Grands were sometimes given custom art cases. The most famous of these were the two Rococo art case Model Rs installed in the First Class spaces of the RMS Titanic along with a similarly styled art case Model B, in addition to two standard Model Ks located in the Second Class spaces.
