= Freeman (rapper) =

French rapper

- Born: 9 May 1972 (age 53); Marseille
- Citizenship: France,Algeria
- Occupations: Actor,Rapper,Dancer,Breakdancer

Malek Brahimi (also known as Abdelmalek Sultan), better known by his stage name Freeman, is a French hip hop artist and breakdancer. He was a member of the successful hip hop group IAM together with Akhenaton, Shurik'n, Khéops, Imhotep, and Kephren. He has also worked as a solo artist and an actor. Freeman lives in Marseille, but says that he is above all an Internationalist.

== Life and Career ==
Brahimi was born in Algiers, Algeria on 9 May 1972, and has lived most of his life in the district of Belsunce, in Marseille. At first, when IAM was formed in 1988, Brahimi worked with them as a breakdancer under the alias Abdelmalek Sultan, but he soon started rapping and appearing on the group's albums. In 1999, he published his first solo album, L'palais de justice.

Freeman also appeared as an actor in Comme un aimant, a 2000 film by fellow IAM member Akhenaton and Kamel Saleh.

== Discography ==
- L'Palais de Justice (1999)
- Mars Eyes (2001)
- L'espoir d'un (c)reve (2008)
