= Mrs Mills =

English pianist (1918–1978)

- Mrs Mills album cover

Background information
- Also known as: Gladys Mills
- Born: Gladys Jordan; 29 August 1918; Beckton, England
- Died: 24 February 1978 (aged 59) London, England
- Genres: Sing-along
- Occupations: Musician; singer
- Instrument: Piano
- Years active: 1961–1976
- Labels: Parlophone; Capitol (Canada)

Gladys Mills (née Jordan; 29 August 1918 – 24 February 1978), known professionally as Mrs Mills, was an English pianist who was active in the 1960s and 1970s, and who released many records. Her repertoire included many sing-along and party tunes made popular in the music hall, generally in a stride piano technique, often in a tack piano style.

== Early life ==
Mills was born in the East London suburb of Beckton. Her uncle Henry was a harpist and her mother was the main influence in developing her musical ability. She took piano lessons from the age of 3½ to the age of seven.

She married Gilbert (Bert) Mills, who worked for London Transport, in February 1947. They settled in Loughton, Essex, where she lived for most of her life.

== Career ==
=== 1960s ===
While working as the superintendent of a typing pool in the office of the Paymaster General in London, Mills performed as a honky-tonk pianist in her free time, in the evenings and weekends. She was spotted by a talent scout while playing piano with a semi-professional band called The Astorians, at a dance night at the Woodford Golf Club in Essex.

In 1961 she released her first record, "Mrs Mills Medley", a single that entered the Top Twenty of the UK Singles Chart.

At the age of 43, in December 1961, she made her first television appearance on The Billy Cotton Show. By the end of January 1962 she was a household name, having risen to fame in the same period as her stable-mates The Beatles, with whom she had shared space at Abbey Road Studios (as mentioned in the Beatles Anthology DVD bonus materials).

She toured the UK throughout the 1960s, making several appearances on TV and radio. Mills was also a successful recording artist overseas in territories with large numbers of economic migrants from the UK, such as Australia, Canada and Hong Kong. Her career as an entertainer would last well into the 1970s.

Her agent was Eric Easton, who later went on to manage The Dave Clark Five and The Rolling Stones, and then signed a recording contract with Parlophone.

Her oeuvre consisted of British and international standards, plus cover versions of contemporary hits. Her covers included "Diamonds Are a Girl's Best Friend", "Hello, Dolly!", "I'm Forever Blowing Bubbles" and "Yellow Submarine", all of which were re-released by EMI in their 2003 compilation The Very Best of Mrs Mills.

=== 1970s ===
Mills appeared on two episodes of The Morecambe and Wise Show in 1971 and 1974, where she performed a medley of favourites with the studio orchestra. In 1973, she appeared in an episode of The Wheeltappers and Shunters Social Club.

In December 1974, she appeared as the subject of This Is Your Life, hosted by Eamonn Andrews, during which it was revealed that the first record she had recorded was "A Gal in Calico", cut in a "make-your-own-record" booth on Southend Pier for a half-crown, with her childhood friend Lily Dormer.

In 1975, her distinctive performing style was satirised in an edition of BBC TV's The Two Ronnies, originally broadcast on BBC Two on 23 January 1975. The sketch, titled "Family Entertainment – John & Mrs Mills", occupied the end-of-the-show musical slot in episode 4 of the fourth series. It featured Ronnie Barker as a silk-laden Mrs Mills at piano and Ronnie Corbett as a uniformed Sir John Mills (who was unrelated to Mrs Mills). Barker and Corbett performed a medley of Mills-style classics revolving around John Mills' character in the 1969 film Oh! What a Lovely War.

Little was seen of Mills on television in her final years, and she died of a heart attack on 24 February 1978 in London.

== Legacy ==
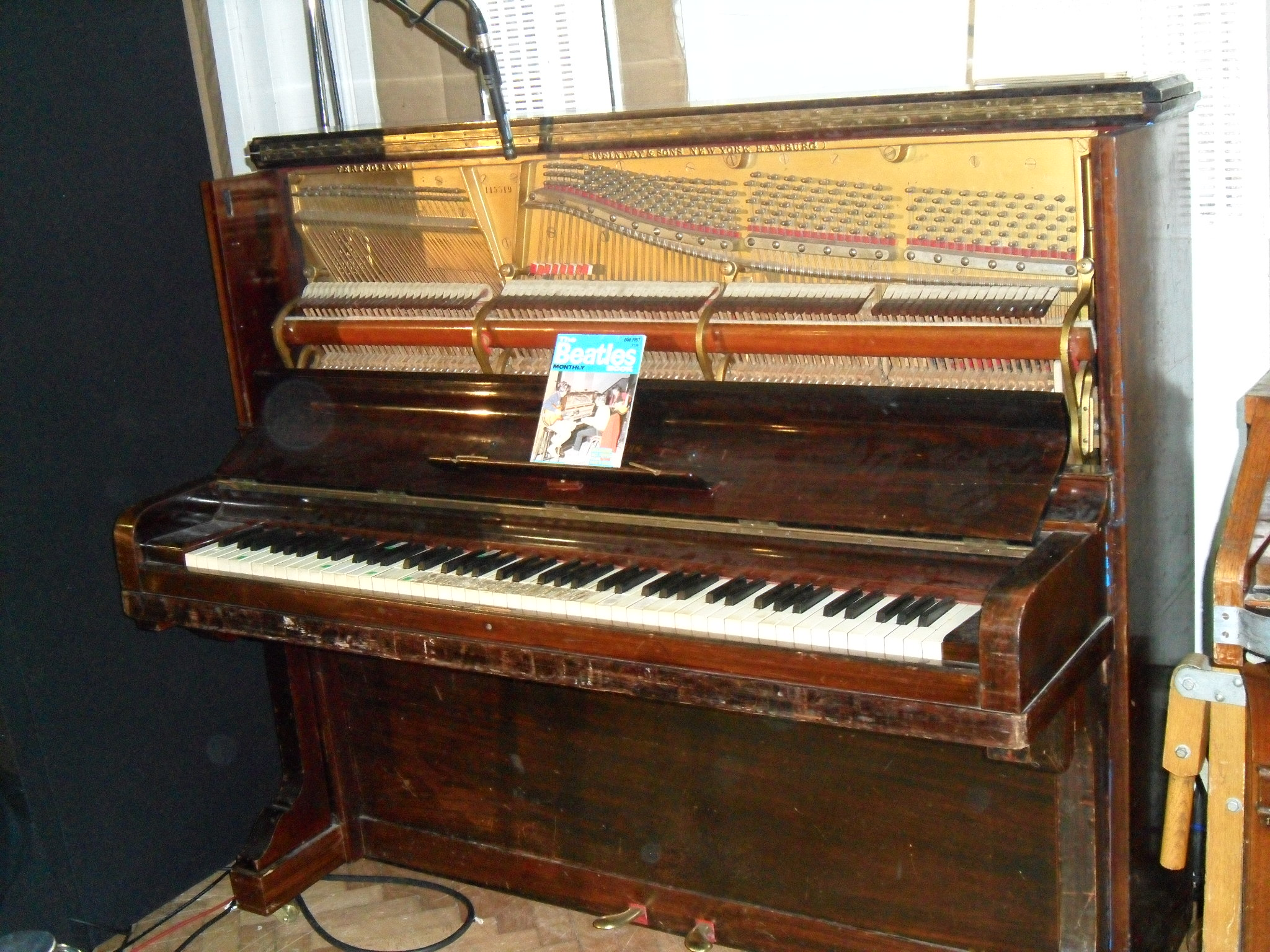
"The Mrs. Mills Piano" at Abbey Road Studios

The name "The Mrs. Mills Piano" was given to a vintage 1905 Steinway Vertegrand upright piano, frequently used by her at Abbey Road Studios in London, where she recorded. The piano, with a characteristic out-of-tune honky-tonk sound, has remained in use at Abbey Road for over 50 years and was used in countless recordings made there, including some by The Beatles.

According to Eddie Vedder in an interview for the SmartLess podcast in February 2022, Paul McCartney tried to buy the piano but the studio refused. Eddie Vedder's 2022 album, Earthling, contains a song called "Mrs. Mills" about the piano, featuring Ringo Starr on drums.

The piano was featured in the 2024 Doctor Who episode "The Devil's Chord."

Although Mills' musical legacy had been largely forgotten in recent times, June 2012 saw the emergence of London-based tribute band The Mrs Mills Experience with a debut at The Vintage Festival at Boughton House in Northamptonshire. On 13 July, they were filmed playing live at The Prince Albert pub in Brixton, London Borough of Lambeth by the BBC. On 23 September 2012, BBC Four broadcast the 60-minute documentary Let's Have a Party! The Piano Genius of Mrs Mills on the life of Mills, which included footage of the band and contributions from Rick Wakeman, Rowland Rivron and Pete Murray, amongst others.

Loughton Town Council commissioned a blue plaque to her memory on the house at 43 Barncroft Close, her home for many years.

== Discography ==
A Best of CD was released by the EMI Gold imprint and another CD (The Mrs Mills Collection) appeared on the HMV Easy label. A list of her UK output is as follows:

=== EMI/Parlophone Records — singles (all mono) with the Geoff Love Orchestra ===
Catalogue number	Issue date	Title
R 4856	1961	"Mrs Mills Medley" parts 1 and 2
R 4863	1962	"Popcorn" / "Bobbikins"
R 4933	1962	"Entry of the Tradiators" / "South Rampart Street Parade"
R 4975	1962	"Mrs Mills Hoe-Down Party" parts 1 and 2
R 5008	1963	"Bubbling Over" / "The First Waltz"
R 5081	1963	"We're Gonna Throw A Little Party" / "Ten Green Bottles"
R 5214	1964	"Mrs Mills Party Medley" parts 1 and 2
R 5238	1965	"Mrs Mills' Minstrel Medley" parts 1 and 2
R 5367	November 1965	"Mrs Mills' Party Medley" parts 1 and 2 (not to be confused with the 1964 release)
R 5399	January 1966	"Newsboy" / "Someone Like You"
R 5549	December 1966	"Glad Today Medley" / "Glad Yesterday Medley"
R 5599	19 May 1967	"I Was Queen Victoria's Chambermaid" / "Thank You Everybody" (listed as "Mrs Mills With Adequate Support")
R 5653	November 1967	"Party Hit Parade" parts 1 and 2
R 5678	1968	"Candy Floss" / "Indian Summer"
R 5748	6 December 1968	"Glad's Party" parts 1 and 2
R 5822	28 November 1969	"Battle of Britain Medley" / "A Wee Drop of Scotch"
R 5834	1970	"The Champs Elysees" / "Kiss Curl Caper" (listed as Mrs Mills And Her Happy Piano)
R 5877	November 1970	"Mrs Mills' Minstrel Medley" parts 1 and 2 (not to be confused with the 1965 release)
R 5950	12 May 1972	"Sunshine" / "Bobbikins"

=== EMI/Parlophone Records – EPs (all mono) ===
Catalogue number	Issue date	Title
GEP 8861	1962	The Happy Piano Player (released in NZ as MGEP 8861)
GEP 8865	1962	Mrs Mills Plays The Roaring Twenties
GEP 8918	1964	Everybody's Welcome at Mrs Mills' Party
GEP 8935	1963	Any Time's Party Time with Mrs Mills
GEP 8943	1965	It's Party Time!
GEP 8958	1966	Mrs Mills' Party

=== EMI/Parlophone Records – LPs (PMC: mono, PCS: stereo) ===
Catalogue number	Issue date	Title
PMC 1178	1962	Mrs Mills Plays The Roaring Twenties, also released in 1962 by The World Record Club in Great Britain, on their label, number ST994, showing a portrait cover art
PMC 1212	November 1963	Everybody's Welcome at Mrs Mills' Party
PMC 1234	1964	It's Party Time!
PMC 1254	September 1964	Music For Anytime
PMC 1264	November 1965	Mrs Mills' Party
PCS 3030	1962	Mrs Mills Plays The Roaring Twenties
PCS 3049	November 1963	Everybody's Welcome at Mrs Mills' Party
PCS 3070	September 1965	Music For Anytime
PCS 3074	November 1965	Mrs Mills' Party
PMC/PCS 7002	April 1966	Especially For You
PMC/PCS 7010	1966	Come to my Party
PMC/PCS 7020	April 1967	Look Mum – No Hands!
PMC/PCS 7035	December 1967	Let's Have Another Party
PCS 7046	April 1968	Summer Party
PCS 7066	November 1968	Party Pieces
PCS 7080	July 1969	Back to the Roaring Twenties
PCS 7087	January 1970	Party Mixture
PCS 7117	November 1970	Bumper Bundle Party
PCS 7129	July 1971	More Music For Anytime
PCS 7143	January 1972	Music Hall Party
PCS 7152	July 1972	Anytime Is Party Time
PCS 7153	October 1972	Another Flippin' Party
PCS 7166	June 1974	Hollywood Party
PCS 7167	November 1974	It's Party Time Again

=== EMI/Music For Pleasure Records – LPs (all stereo) ===
Catalogue number	Issue date	Title
MFP 5225	1966	I'm Mighty Glad
MFP 1406	1967	Your One and Only Mrs Mills
MFP 50009	1974	Piano Singalong (released in Australia on Axis label, featuring a Straube player-piano as the album art)
MFP 50220	1975	Glad with Love (Mrs Mills and Geoff Love Singalong Together)
MFP 50230	1975	Mrs Mills Knees-Up Party

=== Other recordings (all stereo) ===
Record label	Catalogue number	Issue date	Information
Regal Starline Records	SRS 5029	1970	Party Sing-Along (released in Australia on EMI Parlophone label)
Regal Starline Records	SRS 5089	1971	All Time Party Dances (released in Australia on EMI Parlophone label)
EMI/Encore Records	ONCR 508	1971	All Time Party Dances and Other Favourites (released in Australia on Axis label, comprising All Time Party Dances LP, plus selected tracks from other Parlophone albums)
EMI/One-Up Records	OU 2076	1970–79	It's Party Time! (reissue). Also released in Scotland, with album art showing Mrs Mills with various cute puppies.
EMI/One-Up Records	OU 2197	1977	Glad Tidings – Mrs Mills' Christmas Party
EMI/Sounds Superb Records	SPR 90012	1973	Non-Stop Honky-Tonk Party (blue or purple background)
EMI/Double-Up Records	DUO 108	1973	What a Wonderful Party (double album). The cover shows a chimpanzees' tea party. Selections from this double album were released in Australia as Parlophone SPMEO 10164, What a Wonderful Party, with a cartoon-style piano cover.
EMI/Double-Up Records	DUO 122	1976	Jumbo-Party (double album – elephant cover). These albums were released separately in Australia as Jumbo Party, Volume 1 and 2, EMI EMB 10383 and 10384.
EMI/Double-Up Records	DUO 124	1977	Jubilee Party (double album). These albums were released separately in Australia as Jubilee Party Volume 1 and 2, AXIS.6358 and AXIS.6360.
Liberty Records	LST-7359	1964	My Mother the Ragtime Piano Player – 6-track, 33 rpm 7-inch EP – (consisting of selections from Mrs Mills Plays the Roaring 20s)
Liberty Records	LRP-3359 (mono) or LST-7359 (stereo)	1964	My Mother the Ragtime Piano Player – 33 rpm 12-inch album, US release of Mrs Mills Plays the Roaring 20s
Unknown	Unknown	Unknown	"Auld Lang Syne / Happy Birthday" (distributed in South Africa)
EMI Records	EMC 2228	1974	"Smile Smile Smile" / "Da-Dar Da-Dar" – 7 inch single
EMI Records	EMC 3092	1975	For Your Party – Mrs Mills Sings and Plays
Music For Pleasure	DL 41 1058 3	1984	Piano Party Time – double album, a re-release of Music for Anytime and Mrs Mills Party
Capitol Canada	ST6082	1964	Mrs Mills & Russ Conway – Let's Have a Party – Mrs Mills content consists of various singles such as "Entry of the Tradiators" and "Ten Green Bottles", plus two tracks from Mrs Mills Plays the Roaring 20s
Capitol Canada	ST6151	1965	Another Party with Mrs Mills – (Canadian release of Mrs Mills Party)
Deutscher Schallplattenclub	H-044	1967	Mrs Mills – Am Schräger Klavier ("At the Diagonal Piano") – (German release of Mrs Mills Plays the Roaring 20s)
Telemark Dance Records	892	1973	"Candy Floss / Someone Like You" – 7 inch single
S*R International Label	74989-P12	1966	Mrs Mills' Crazy Party – German release, consisting of various selections from Mrs Mills Plays the Roaring 20s interspersed with traditional jazz tunes from The New Orleans Hot Dogs
EMI Odeon	O 23 390	1966	"Mrs Mills Klimperkasten Potpourri" – German release of "Glad Today" and "Glad Yesterday" – 7-inch 45 rpm single
Music For Pleasure	FP 10055	1975 Tapetunes	"Chattanooga Choo Choo" & "Little Sir Echo" – listed as a "Piano Singalong with Mrs Mills" 45 rpm single
EMIMUSIC	EMAJ(M)8504	1988 EMI Brigadiers (Johannesburg)	EMIMUSIC presents Mrs Mills – LP compilation from various other Mrs Mills albums

A number of additional albums, with titles such as Knees-Up Roaring 20s Party, Crazy Rhythm, Mairzy Doats and Dozy Doats, Just Mrs Gladys Mills, and Welcome To Mrs Mills' Honky Tonk Party, are either compilations of tracks from various EMI Parlophone albums and singles, or older albums reissued under new titles. The cover art on these albums, rather than the content, has been of interest to collectors.
