= Calderstone Productions =

Subsidiary of Universal Music Group

Calderstone Productions Limited
- Parent company: UMe (Universal Music Group)
- Founded: November 15, 2012
- Founder: Universal Music Group
- Status: Active
- Genre: Rock
- Location: London

Calderstone Productions Limited is the London-based subsidiary of Universal Music Group that administers the Beatles' recorded music output that was originally owned by EMI. These works were released on EMI's Parlophone label in the United Kingdom and by Capitol Records in the United States, from 1962 to 1968; and then by the Beatles' own EMI-distributed Apple Records label from 1968 to 1970.

== History ==
Universal Music acquired the Beatles' catalog with its 2013 purchase of EMI, along with the rights to the EMI and Capitol trademarks, and established Calderstone (initially named "Beatles Holdco Ltd.") to administer the Beatles' catalog worldwide. As part of the deal, however, Universal was required by regulators to divest several EMI properties, most notably Parlophone, which it sold to Warner Music Group in 2013. Consequently, Calderstone currently releases Beatles recordings on the Apple label worldwide, and on Apple/Capitol in the United States, though reissues of Beatles albums originally released on the Parlophone label retain the Parlophone trademark (under license from Warner) as part of the original albums' artwork.

Calderstone also administers solo recordings by John Lennon and Ringo Starr originally released on the Apple label. Paul McCartney's solo Apple recordings, however, are owned by his company MPL Communications, and since 2016 are distributed by Universal Music's Capitol Records unit. Since 2023, George Harrison's solo recordings have been owned by Dark Horse Records and distributed by BMG.
