= Otis Waygood =

Rhodesian blues band

Otis Waygood was a blues band in the 1960s in Salisbury, Rhodesia (now Harare, Zimbabwe). The original members were Benny Miller, Rob Zipper, Alan Zipper, Leigh Sagar, Ivor Rubenstein, Angus McLean and Billy Toon.

== History ==
In November 1969, Rob & Alan Zipper, Ivor Rubenstein and Leigh Sagar travelled to Cape Town in South Africa, with all of their gear, for a playing holiday. They were invited to play at the Battle of the Bands at Green Point Stadium and were extremely well received. This led to an invitation to a residency in a Johannesburg club and then to their being signed up by the Clive Calder-Ralph Simon management team who produced the group's first album in two days. They had a recording contract with EMI and undertook three national tours, playing at city halls in almost every city in South Africa, Rhodesia and Mozambique.

Singer and flautist, Martin Jackson, had a brief spell in the line-up during this period but left in November 1970 and was replaced by Harry Paulus. Bennie Miller, the guitarist from Salisbury (now Harare), originated the group but left in 1969 when the band went to South Africa. He rejoined briefly at the end of 1970 and mid 1972.

Otis Waygood's blues-jazz fusion made them one of the top live bands in South Africa of the early '70s touring South Africa and Rhodesia. In 1971 the group traveled to play in the Netherlands, Germany and the United Kingdom, where they settled. In 1976, they added three Caribbean musicians to their line-up and pursued a more reggae-based sound. After several years of playing the British clubs, pubs and concert halls as Otis Waygood, in 1977 they changed their name to Immigrant and their final tour was supporting Tavares, ending up at the Palladium, in London. The group disbanded in 1979

The band name originated from a transposition of the name appearing on a number of lifts installed in Rhodesian buildings by Waygood Otis elevators. Waygood & Co. (later R Waygood & Co. and Waygood Otis) was a UK- based elevator company which was merged with Otis.

== Discography ==
=== Singles ===
- "You're Late Miss Kate" / "Fever" (1970) on Parlophone
- "Get It Started" / "Red Hot Passion" (1975) Gallo
- "Sweet Soul Syncopation" / "Who's Your Friend?" (1976) Decca
- "Everything I Am" / "Then You Can Tell Me Goodbye" (1977) Decca
- "One World" (1978) on Decca (as Immigrant)

=== Albums ===
- Otis Waygood Blues Band (1970) on Parlophone (now a Fresh Music CD)
- Simply (1971) on Parlophone (now a Fresh Music CD)
- Ten Light Claps And A Scream (1971) on Parlophone (now a Fresh Music CD)

=== Compilations ===
- Rock Today With The Big Heavies And Mixed Bag (1971) on Parlophone
