= ...De la planète Mars =

Studio album by IAM
- Released: 1991
- Length: 61:05
- Label: Hostile France
- Producer: Sodi

... De la planète Mars is the first album by the French hip hop band IAM, produced by Sodi. The album was well received, but tentatively, due to the few tracks where the rapping was done in English.

== Tracks ==
1. "Pharaon revient" – 1:06
2. "Planète Mars" – 4:26
3. "Jazz" – 0:09
4. "Tam-Tam de l'Afrique" – 3:51
5. "IAM concept" – 4:11
6. "Crack" – 0:04
7. "Attentat" – 4:46
8. "Disco club" – 0:32
9. "Le nouveau président" – 3:27
10. "IAM Bercy" – 0:25
11. "Non soumis à l'état" – 4:18
12. "1 peu trop court" – 3:40
13. "Do the raï thing" – 1:18
14. "Red, black and green" –
15. "Lève ton slip" – 0:26
16. "Elvis" – 3:46
17. "Unité" – 4:06
18. "Kheops € à l'horizon" – 3:35
19. "Je viens de Marseille" – 1:16
20. "Wake up" – 4:22
21. "Crécelle" – 1:02
22. "La tension monte" – 4:46
23. "Rapline II" – 0:29
