= Fafa =

Fafa is a given name. Notable people with the name include:

- Fafá de Belém (born 1956), Brazilian singer
- Fafà Picault (born 1991), American soccer player
- Fafa Sanyang, Gambian politician and civil servant
- Fahadh Faasil (born 1982), Indian actor, abbreviated FaFa
