= IAM (band) =

French hip hop band

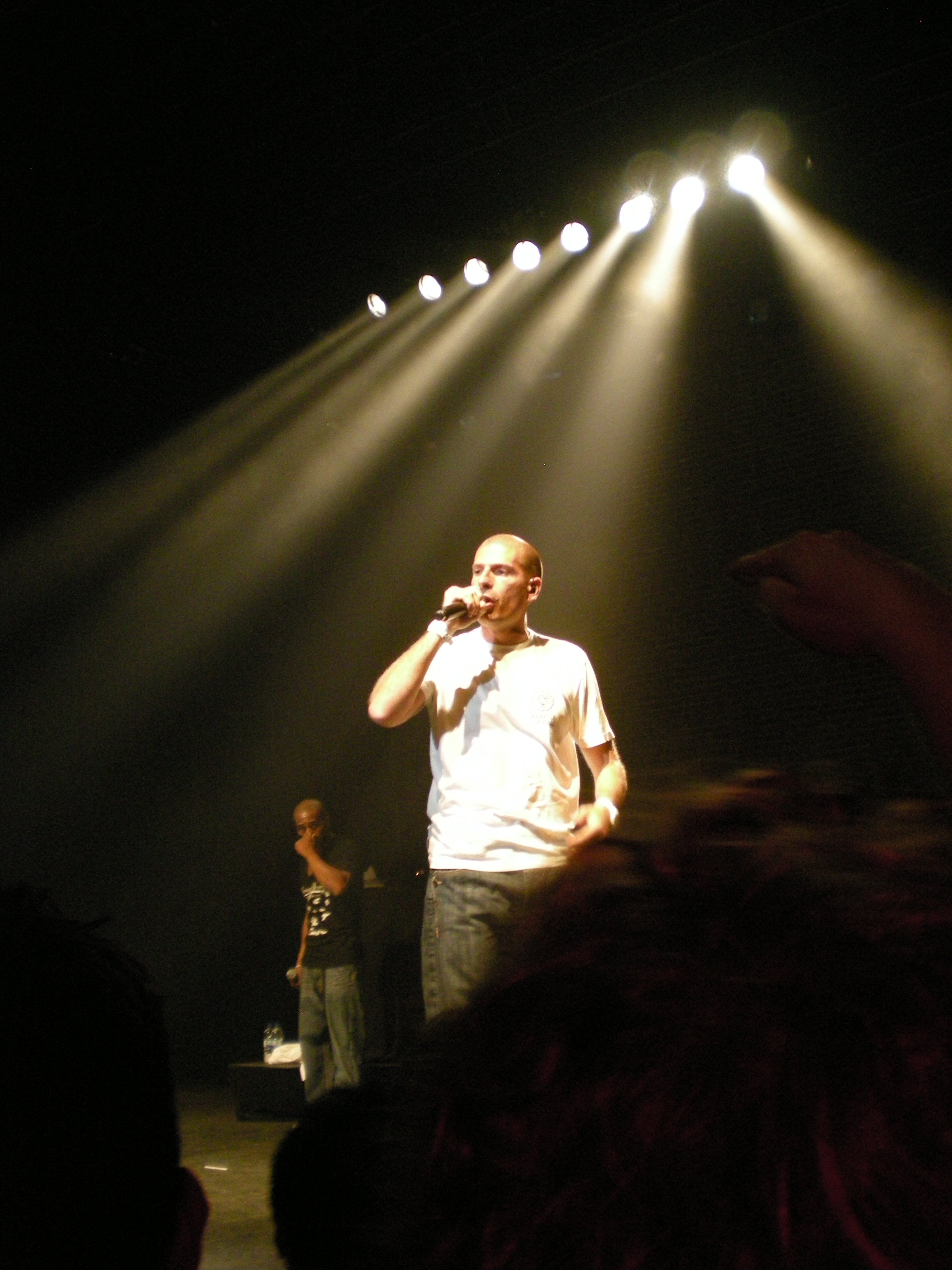
- Akhenaton performing live from Montreal, Canada

Background information
- Origin: Marseille, France
- Genre: French hip hop
- Years active: 1989–present
- Labels: Delabel; Hostile Records; Def Jam Recordings France
- Members: Philippe Fragione (Akhenaton); Geoffroy Mussard (Shurik'n Chang-Ti); Éric Mazel (Khéops); Pascal Perez (Imhotep); François Mendy (Kephren)
- Past members: Abdelmalek Sultan (Freeman)
- Website: www.be-shop.fr

IAM (pronounced "I am") is a French hip hop group from Marseille. Formed in 1989, it comprises Akhenaton (AKH; Philippe Fragione), Shurik'n (Geoffroy Mussard), Khéops (Éric Mazel), Imhotep (Pascal Perez) and Kephren (François Mendy). IAM has several meanings, including Invasion Arrivée de Mars ("Invasion from Mars"; Mars is frequently used as a metaphor for Marseille in IAM songs). Another meaning is Imperial Asiatic Man, while AKH often refers to L'homme Impérial Asiatique.

== Themes ==
One of IAM's central themes in its songs is Africa. The group, which is one of the pioneer French rap groups, draws heavily in their music on allusions to Africa and particularly ancient Egypt. Their 1991 song "Les tam-tam de l'Afrique" was one of the first French rap hits to deal expressly with the issue of slavery. Using a sample of a Stevie Wonder song, "Les tam-tam de l'Afrique" focuses on the "abduction of its inhabitants, the Middle Passage, and the plantation system in the Americas".

IAM promotes an ideology that is based upon images associated with ancient Egypt, primarily upon the mythical allusions to pharaohs. By 1989 the group developed a unique rap style, mixing French beats and lyrics with Middle Eastern and Egyptian influences. Their stage names are of Egyptian origin; one of the group members, Eric Mazel, goes by the name Kheops, an allusion to the Egyptian pharaoh who built pyramids. This connection with ancient Egypt allows IAM "to assert connections to the contemporary Arab world in an indirect way."

Indeed, this "pharaoism", as French rap music specialist Andre Previous calls it, represents an attempt to negotiate and maintain a cultural identity in the context of a social scene rife with racist and discriminatory ideologies. Because many Muslims don't feel at home in white French society, references to Arabic origins and Islamic fundamentalism are part of a highly socially contested discourse on identity politics in French music. Thus, by employing 'pharaoism' to hide these references to and elicitations of the Arab world, IAM successfully articulates its connections with the "Franco-Maghrebi" cause and establishes an important social space for itself. The pharaoist aspects of IAM's rap help the group stay in touch with its origins where some non-white French people have assimilated unquestioningly into the surrounding French culture. Therefore, the group's rap is both politically charged and defiant, as it attempts to subvert notions of racial superiority by "[proposing] multiracial alliance as an alternative to the 'old' [French] politics." Most importantly, rap provides IAM with a place to address social issues and speak out against racial intolerance where the group can actually be heard. In fact, the first single release from their second album, "Je danse le Mia", "went on to prove an enormous hit on the French mainstream", according to French radio station RFI Musique. In this way, the use of 'pharaoism' as a mystical and coded strategy for the injection of Arabic and Egyptian lyrics, ideas, and sentiments into the music is what makes it commercially viable. Otherwise, if the music were any more outright in its references to Arabic origins, white French conservatives might identify it with Islamic Fundamentalism's grips over North African diasporatic communities living in France and try to censor it and impede the cause it stands for.

"'Les tams-tams de l'Afrique' was one of the first hits of French rap and dealt expressly with slavery. Using a sample of 'Pastime Paradise' by Stevie Wonder, this track focused on the plunder of Africa, the abduction of its inhabitants, the Middle Passage, and the plantation system in the Americas".

== Collaborations ==
IAM have a long history of collaborations with the American hip hop group, the Wu-Tang Clan. IAM have sampled an Inspectah Deck lyric from the Wu-Tang Clan song "C.R.E.A.M", which states "Life as a shorty shouldn't be so rough" in their 1998 single, "Petit frère". Additionally, they featured a number of Wu-Tang affiliated artists on their 1997 single "La saga" and later members Method Man and Redman on their 2004 single "Noble Art" the video was directed by New York-based artist "Brad Digital". They were also featured in the song of RZA "Seul face à lui". These hip hop groups have a number of similarities, probably due to the fact that IAM member Akhenaton has listed Wu-Tang as one of his five favorite hip hop artists of all time. One notable example is that both groups have connections to Islam. The Wu-Tang Clan are known members of the Five-Percent Nation and often include Islamic references in their music. On the previously mentioned IAM collaboration, "La saga," rapper Prodigal Sunn states that "IAM, sunz of man from the royal fam, never ate ham, never gave a damn", referencing the dietary restrictions that Muslims have to follow. Similarly, French rappers IAM have used their music to display an alternative Muslim identity [Ref. necessary]. IAM also collaborated with US rapper Lucas on the song "Spin the Globe" with rappers from 5 different countries spitting in 5 different languages showcasing the universal appeal and voice of hip hop.

== Discography ==
=== Albums ===
Year	Album	Peak positions				Units	Certifications
Year	Album	FR	BEL (Fl)	BEL (Wa)	SWI	Units	Certifications
1991	...De la planète Mars: Label: Labelle Noir, Virgin	—	—	—	—		SNEP: Gold
1993	Ombre est Lumière: Label: Delabel	195	—	—	—		
1997	L'École du micro d'argent: Label: Delabel, Côté Obscur	3	—	5	—		IFPI Switzerland: Platinum; SNEP: Platinum
2003	Revoir un printemps: Label: Hostile Records	1	—	1	2		IFPI Switzerland: Gold; SNEP: Gold
2007	Saison 5: Label: Polydor	2	—	4	15		IFPI Switzerland: Gold
2013	Arts Martiens: Label: Def Jam Recordings France	1	60	4	4		SNEP: Gold
2013	...IAM: Label: Def Jam Recordings France	10	—	25	25		
2017	Rêvolution: Label: Def Jam Recordings France	3	151	3	5		SNEP: Gold
2019	Yasuke: Label: Def Jam Recordings France	8	—	19	12	FRA: 15,471	SNEP: Gold
2021	Rimes essentielles: Label: Côté Obscur	74	121	—	—		
2023	HHHistory: Label: Côté Obscur	—	—	—	—		

=== Mixtapes ===
- 1990: IAM Concept
- 2007: Official Mixtape
- 2012: Assassins Scribes
- 2013: Assassins Scribes 2

=== Live albums ===
Year	Album	Peak positions		
Year	Album	FR	BEL (Wa)	SWI
2005	IAM Live au Dôme de Marseille	97	63	–
2008	Retour Aux Pyramides	–	–	–
2023	Warrior Tour Live Studio Recordings	–	–	–

DVD Live

- 2007: Live au Dôme de Marseille (DVD)

=== Compilation albums ===
Year	Album	Peak positions		
Year	Album	FR	BEL (Wa)	SWI
2004	Anthologie 1991–2004	–	31	43
2004	Anthologie 1 & 2 (plus Live au Dôme de Marseille (DVD))	–	–	–
2008	L'Intégrale	–	–	–
2008	IAM 20	–	96	–
2009	Galaxie	–	84	–
2013	Best of 2013–16 classiques	73	51	–
2025	Planète Mars	–	–	–

=== Singles ===
Year	Single	Peak positions				Album
Year	Single	FR	BEL (Wa)	BEL (Wa)	SWI	Album
1991	"Red, Black & Green"	–	–	–	–	...De la planète Mars
1991	"Tam-tam de l'Afrique"	–	–	–	–	...De la planète Mars
1992	"Planète Mars"	–	–	–	–	...De la planète Mars
1993	"Donne-moi le micro"	–	–	–	–	Ombre est Lumière
1994	"Je danse le Mia"	1	–	–	–	Ombre est Lumière
1994	"Le feu"	17	–	–	–	
1995	"Une femme seule" / "Sachet blanc"	30	–	–	–	
1997	"L'empire du côté obscur"	14	31	–	–	L'école du micro d'argent
1997	"Nés sous la même étoile"	41	38	–	–	L'école du micro d'argent
1998	"Petit frère"	50	–	–	–	L'école du micro d'argent
1998	"L'école du micro d'argent"	84	–	–	–	L'école du micro d'argent
1998	"Independenza"	19	18	–	–	
2003	"Noble Art" (featuring Method Man & Redman)	34	–	16	81	
2004	"Revoir un printemps"	58	–	–	–	
2004	"Nous" (featuring Kayna Samet)	–	–	16	94	
2004	"Stratégie d'un pion"	69	–	8	–	
2005	"Où va la vie" (featuring Moïse)	24	–	17	68	
2013	"Les raisons de la colère"	77	–	–	–	
2013	"Spartiate Spirit"	184	–	–	–	
2013	"CQFD"	107	–	–	–	
2017	"Monnaie de singe"	47	–	–	–	
2017	"Grande rêves, grandes boîtes"	191	–	–	–	
2017	"Orthodoxes"	139	–	–	–	
2019	"Self Made Men" (featuring Psy 4 de la Rime)	199	–	–	–	

Other releases

- 1997: "La saga" (featuring Timbo King, Dreddy Krueger and Prodigal Sunn)
- 2004: "Second souffle"
- 2007: "Une autre brique dans le mur"
- 2007: "Ca vient de la rue"
- 2007: "Offishall
- 2008: "Coupe Le Cake"

== Discography (solo projects) ==
Year	Album	IAM member
1995	Métèque et mat	Akhenaton
1998	Sad Hill	DJ Khéops
1998	Chroniques de Mars	Imhotep
1998	Où je vis	Shurik'n
1999	L'palais d'justice	Freeman
2000	Sad Hill Impact	DJ Kheops
2001	Sol invictus	Akhenaton
2001	Mars Eyes	Freeman
2000	Black album	Akhenaton
2005	Double Chill Burger – Quality Best Of	Akhenaton
2006	Soldats de fortune	Akhenaton
2008	L'espoir d'un crève	Freeman
2011	We luv New York	Akhenaton
2012	Tous m'appellent Shu	Shurik'n
2012	Kheper	Imhotep
2014	Je suis en vie	Akhenaton
2016	Adamant-ium	Shurik'n
2020	Astéroïde	Akhenaton
2022	Latin quarter	Akhenaton
2023	Monopolium	Akhenaton

Soundtracks

Year	Film	Film director	IAM member
1998	Taxi	Gérard Pirès	Akhenaton
2000	Comme un aimant	Kamel Saleh and Akhenaton	Akhenaton
2010	Conte de la frustration	Didier Daarwin and Akhenaton	Akhenaton
2010	Il reste du jambon ?	Anne Depetrini	Akhenaton
