= Akhenaton (rapper) =

French rapper

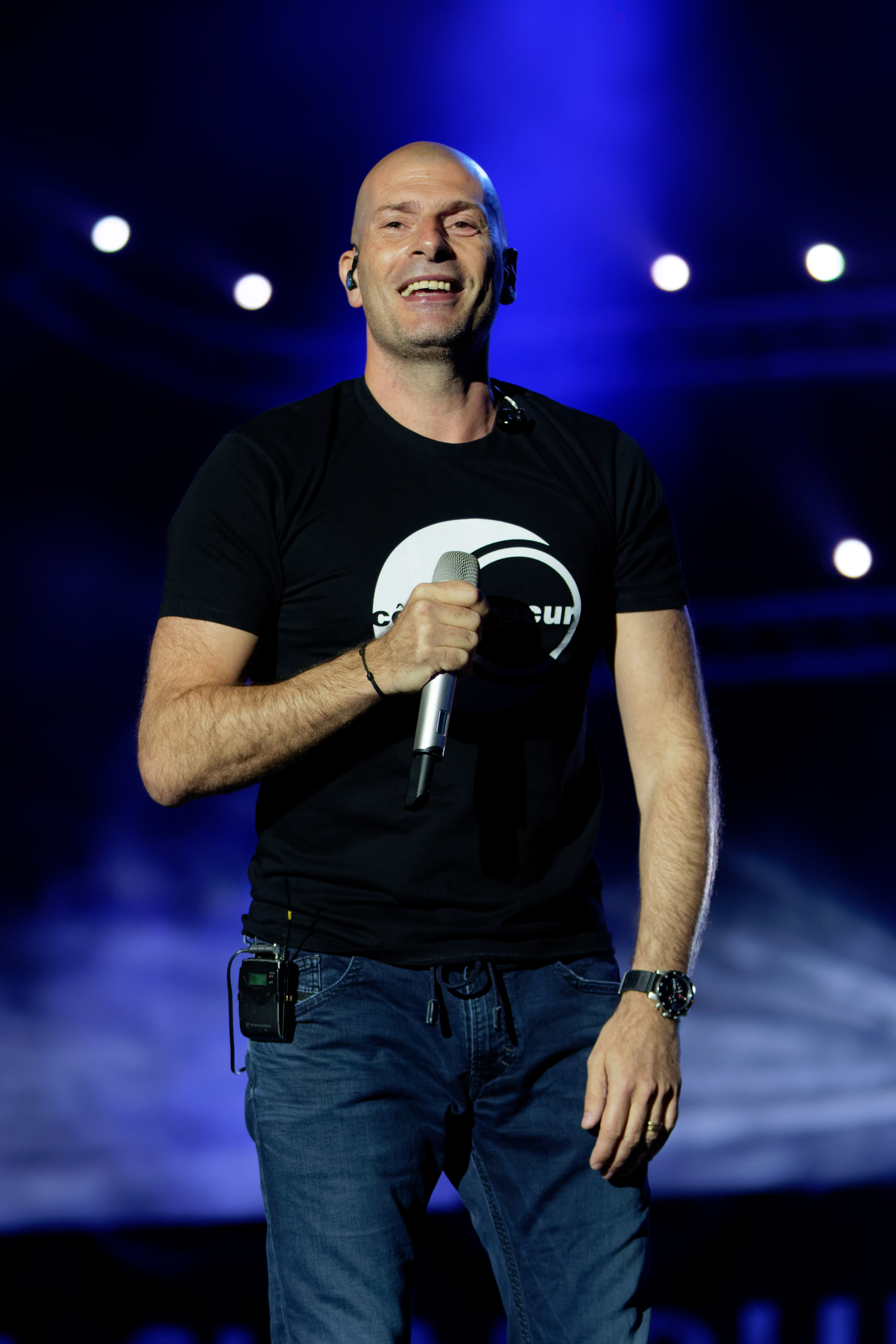
- Akhenaton in 2018

Background information
- Birth name: Philippe Fragione
- Also known as: Chill, AKH, Sentenza, Spectre
- Born: 17 September 1968 (age 56)
- Origin: Marseille, France
- Genres: French hip hop
- Occupation(s): Rapper, record producer
- Years active: 1988–present
- Member of: IAM
- Website: akh-official.com

Philippe Fragione (French pronunciation: [filip fʁaʒjɔn]; Italian: [fraˈdʒoːne]; born 17 September 1968), better known by his stage name Akhenaton, is a French rapper and hip hop producer. He has also worked under the aliases Chill, AKH, Sentenza and Spectre. He is best known as member of hip hop group IAM and has since made a number of records, both with IAM and as a solo artist.

Akhenaton has worked as a producer, producing songs for several French rappers and groups such as Passi, Stomy Bugsy, Fonky Family, Freeman (a fellow member of IAM who has since made his break as a solo artist), La Brigade, Le 3ème Œil, etc. He is the creator of the record label Côté Obscur, the publishing house La Cosca and the vinyl record label 361.

== Biography ==
Akhenaton was born Philippe Fragione in Marseille in 1968 and spent his youth in Plan-de-Cuques, a small village on the outskirts of the city. His family is of Italian origins. His paternal grandmother, Immacolata Scotti, was of Campanian descent, his great-grandfather Francesco Fragione, emigrated from Sperlonga and on his maternal side a great-great-grandfather, Pierre Malano, emigrated from Porte, a great-great-great-grandfather Barthelemy Gionotti, emigrated from Camporgiano and another great-grandmother Maria Lanzarotti, emigrated from Bedonia. In 1981, he discovered hip hop music and started traveling frequently to New York City where he received the nickname "Chill Phil." At about the same time, back in Marseille, he met Éric Mazel, a DJ who would later be known as "Khéops". Mazel and Fragione started working together to advance the cause of French hip hop.

In 1988, Fragione debuted as a hip hop theorist, publishing the essay La deuxième génération du hip-hop (The second generation of hip-hop) in the fanzine Vé. The same year, he appeared on the B-side of the US rapper MC Choice's single "Let's Make Some Noise". Having returned to Marseille, he met Geoffroy Mussard (Shurik'n) and Malek Brahimi (Freeman). Fragione became known as Akhenaton, and together with Khéops and Shurik'n formed the group B.Boys Stance, renamed IAM in 1989. The group was later joined by Freeman, Imhotep and Kephren.

Four of the six members of IAM chose ancient Egyptian names as stage names. Akhenaton converted to Islam from Catholicism. Musicologists argue that Akhenaton and the other members of IAM index the modern Arab world through the use of their names. Instead of overtly pointing out North African countries and the turmoil that has surrounded the contemporary Arab community, the Egyptian names allow the audience to covertly draw parallels between IAM and North Africa.

Instead of focusing on violence and rebellion like many other French rappers, Akhenaton and IAM remain true to their hometown, Marseille. In Marseille rap has reportedly remained relatively peaceful. Akhenaton posits that rappers in Marseille are more socially conscious because they feel a strong sense of community.

After IAM's first three albums' success, Akhenaton released his first solo album, Métèque et mat, in 1995. The album sold 300,000 copies and was followed by Sol Invictus in 2001. He began to delve into his other projects, such as producing Passi's album Les tentations (1997) and the 2001 film Comme un aimant. He continued working with IAM, releasing the album Revoir un printemps in 2003 and Saison 5 in 2007.

== Discography ==
=== Albums ===
Year	Album	Peak positions		
Year	Album	FR	BEL (Wa)	SWI
1995	Métèque et mat	66	–	–
2001	Sol Invictus	3	5	25
2002	Black Album	25	49	35
2006	Soldats de fortune	8	9	20
2014	Je suis en vie	9	13	23

Compilations

- 2000: Electro Cypher, compilation

Soundtracks

Year	Album	Peak positions		
Year	Album	FR	BEL (Wa)	SWI
1998	Taxi	–	–	–
2000	Comme un aimant (The Magnet)	7	23	–
2010	La face B (La bande originale du livre)	117	–	–

=== Singles ===
Year	Single	Peak positions			Album
Year	Single	FR	BEL (Wa)	SWI	Album
1996	"Bad Boys de Marseille" (with La Fonky Family)	13	33	–	
1997	"J'ai pas de face"	32	–	–	
2000	"Belsunce Breakdown"	–	18* (Ultratip)	–	
2001	"AKH"	12	15	–	
2001	"Une impression"	66	11* (Ultratip)	–	
2002	"J'ai vraiment pas de face"	52	9* (Ultratip)	–	
2002	"L'Américain" (with Faf Larage)	53	15* (Ultratip)	91	
2006	"Foot 2 rue"	9	13* (Ultratip)	–	
2015	"Vivre maintenant"	95	–	–	

*Did not appear in the official Belgian Ultratop 50 charts, but rather in the bubbling under Ultratip charts.

Featured in / collaborations

Year	Single	Peak positions	Album
Year	Single	FR	Album
1998	"Def Bond (Secret Défense Remix)" (Kheops feat. Def Bond & Spectre a.k.a. Akhenaton)	30	
1999	"16'30 contre la censure)" (Abou / Akhenaton / Basic / Chien De Paille / Driver / Eben & Niro / Fonky Family / Insomniak / KDD / L'Ame Du Razwar / Menelik / Mystik etc.)	22	
2010	"À mi-chemin" (Hocus Pocus feat. Akhenaton & Ben L'Oncle Soul)	70	
