= Shurik'n =

French rapper (born 1966)

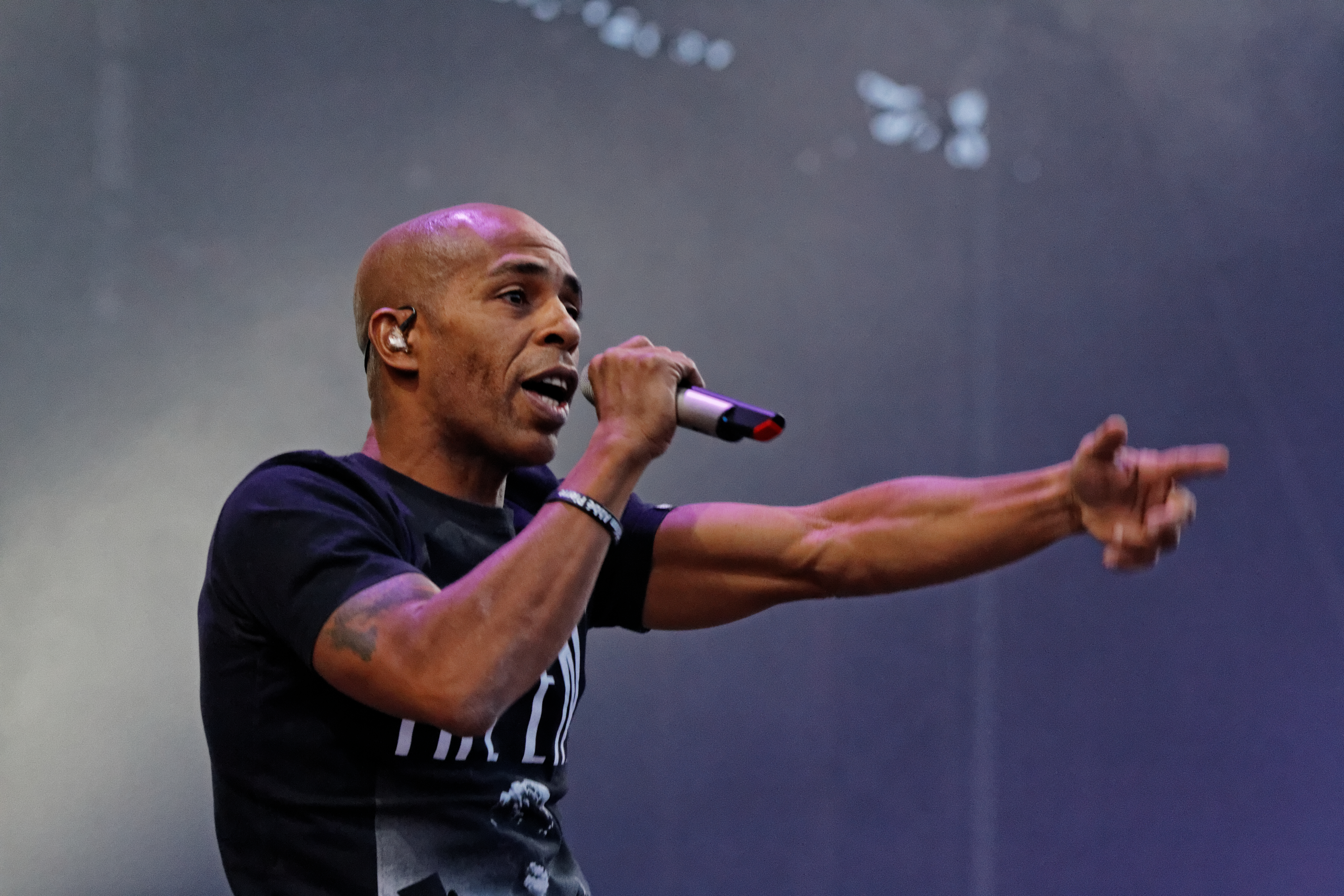
- Shurik'n in 2014

Background information
- Also known as: Shurik'n Chang-Ti
- Born: Geoffroy Mussard; 11 March 1966 (age 60); Miramas, France
- Origin: Marseille, France
- Genres: Hip hop
- Occupations: Rapper, producer
- Years active: 1986–present
- Labels: Delabel, Hostile Records

Geoffroy Mussard (French pronunciation: [ʒɔfʁwa mysaʁ]; born 11 March 1966), known by his stage name Shurik'n, is a French rapper from Marseille. He is one of the members of the hip hop group IAM, as well as a major solo artist. With his brother Faf Larage (Raphaël Mussard), he also is a member of the group La Garde.

== Life and Career ==
Mussard was born in Miramas on 11 March 1966, with Malagasy and Réunionnais origins. In 1988, he met Akhenaton, with whom he formed IAM. Mussard adopted the stage name Shurik'n Chang-Ti, reflecting his interest in Oriental culture and his background in martial arts, such as judo, karate and kung fu. IAM released its first album, De la Planète Mars, in 1990.

After three albums with IAM, Shurik'n decided to start pursuing a solo career with his 1998 album Où je vis. The album debuted atop the French album chart. In 1997 he had already collaborated with his brother on the compilation disc Chroniques de Mars, and the group released its album La Garde in 2000. Shurik'n also continued working with IAM, which released its fifth album, Revoir un printemps, in 2003.

== Discography ==
=== Albums ===
Solo

Year	Album	Peak Position
Year	Album	FR
1998	Où je vis	1
2012	Tous m'appellent Shu	26
2016	Adamant-ium	126

Mixtapes / Others

- 2000: La Garde (with Faf Larage) (joint album)
- 2010: Daz Tape (mixtape)

with IAM

- 1989: IAM Concept
- 1991: ... de la planète Mars
- 1993: Ombre est lumière
- 1997: L'école du micro d'argent
- 2003: Revoir un printemps
- 2007: IAM Official Mixtape
- 2007: Saison 5

=== Singles ===
Year	Single	Peak Position	Album
Year	Single	FR	Album
1998	"La garde meurt mais ne se rend pas" (Faf Larage & Shurik'n)	93	
2000	"J'leve mon verre"	95	
