= Alain Barrau =

French politician (1947–2021)

Member of the French National Assembly
- In office 12 June 1997 – 18 June 2002
- Preceded by: Raymond Couderc
- Succeeded by: Paul-Henri Cugnenc
- Constituency: Hérault's 6th constituency
- In office 2 April 1986 – 1 April 1993
- Preceded by: position established
- Succeeded by: Raymond Couderc
- Constituency: Hérault's 6th constituency

Mayor of Béziers
- In office March 1989 – June 1995
- Preceded by: Georges Fontès
- Succeeded by: Raymond Couderc

General Councilor of the Canton of Béziers-2
- In office 1988–1989
- Preceded by: Guy Bousquet
- Succeeded by: Eliane Bauduin

Personal details
- Born: 17 February 1947 Paris, France
- Died: 24 July 2021 (aged 74) Paris, France
- Party: PS

Alain Barrau (17 February 1947 – 24 July 2021) was a French politician. He was a member of the Socialist Party (PS).

== Biography ==
=== Professional career ===
Barrau served as student council president at Sciences Po during the May 68 events. He graduated in 1969 and became an assistant at Panthéon-Sorbonne University. He subsequently became director of teaching at the Centre national d'information pour le progrès économique. He held several administrative positions linked to the European Parliament, and was appointed its Director of the Information Office for France in 2008.

=== Political career ===
Barrau was elected to the National Assembly in 1986 in a party-list proportional representation system. In 1988, the system changed to a regional vote, and he began representing Hérault's 6th constituency. Although he was defeated by Raymond Couderc in 1993, he was victorious in 1997. In his final term in office, he served on various committees, such as the Cultural, Family and Social Affairs Committee, the Foreign Affairs Committee, and the Finance Committee. He served as President of the National Assembly delegation to European communities from 1999 to 2002.

Barrau was also Mayor of Béziers from 1989 to 1995 and was General Councilor of the Canton of Béziers-2 from 1988 to 1989.

=== Other activities ===
From 1974 to 1986, Barrau was President of the Comité national des associations de jeunesse et d’éducation populaire and was a member of the Conseil national de la vie associative et du Conseil économique et social. He also served as President of Asmae - Association Sœur Emmanuelle and Vice-President of the Fédération française des maisons de l'Europe.

=== Death ===
Alain Barrau died in Paris on 24 July 2021 at the age of 74 following a battle with cerebrovascular disease.

== Decorations ==
- Knight of the Legion of Honour (2017)
