= Arabs in France =

Total population
- 6,483,482

Regions with significant populations
- Paris, Marseille

Languages
- European French, Arabic

Religion
- Majority: Sunni Islam; Minority: Roman Catholicism, Orthodox Christianity, Shia Islam, Others

Arabs in France are those parts of the Arab diaspora who have immigrated to France, as well as their descendants. Subgroups include Algerians in France, Moroccans in France, Mauritanians in France, Tunisians in France, Lebanese in France and Refugees of the Syrian Civil War. This French subgroup of Arabs in Europe are concentrated in the Maghrebi communities of Paris.

== Demographics ==
French people of Arab and Amazigh/North African origin (predominantly from Maghreb but also some from Mashreq areas of the Arab world) in France forms the second largest ethnic group after French people of French origin.

There are no official figures concerning the demographics of French people of Arab/African descent because ethnic statistics are forbidden in France.

Most immigration was in 1960 and 1970, a period of economic growth, but many of them managed to bring their families after 1970. They have settled mainly in the industrial regions in France, especially the Paris region, but also in Marseille and other places.

== Notable people ==
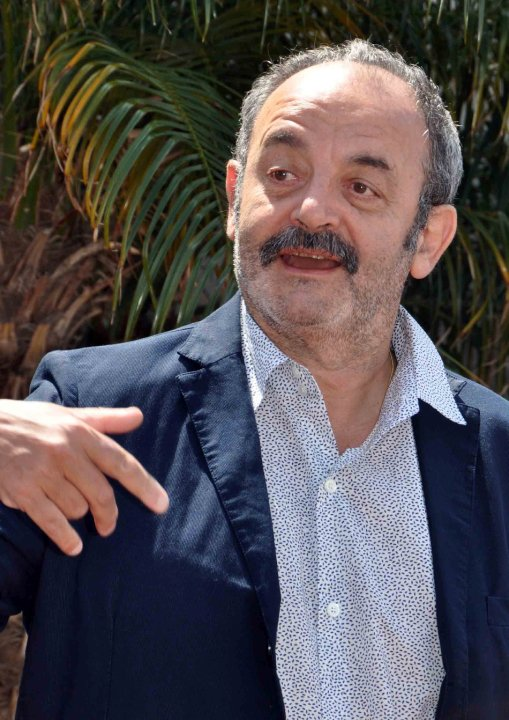
Louis Chedid

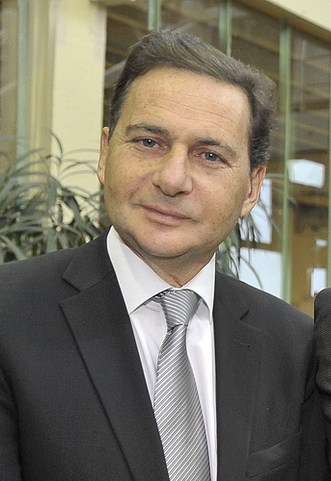
Éric Besson

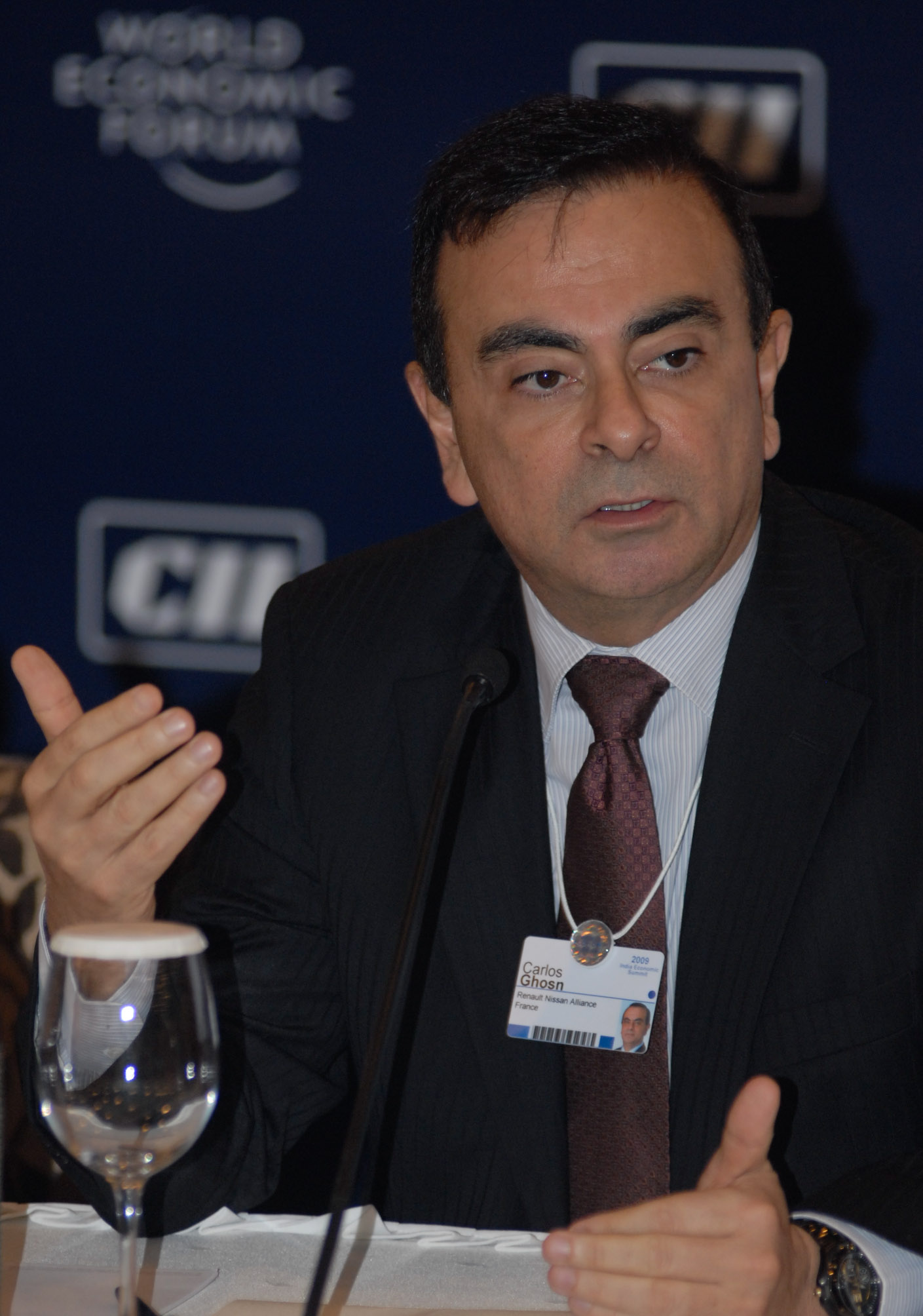
Carlos Ghosn

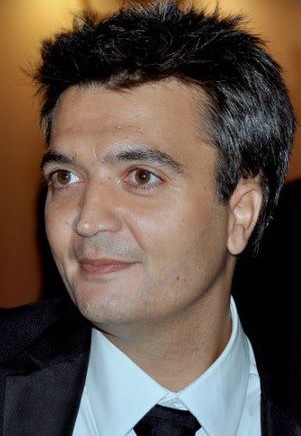
Thomas Langmann

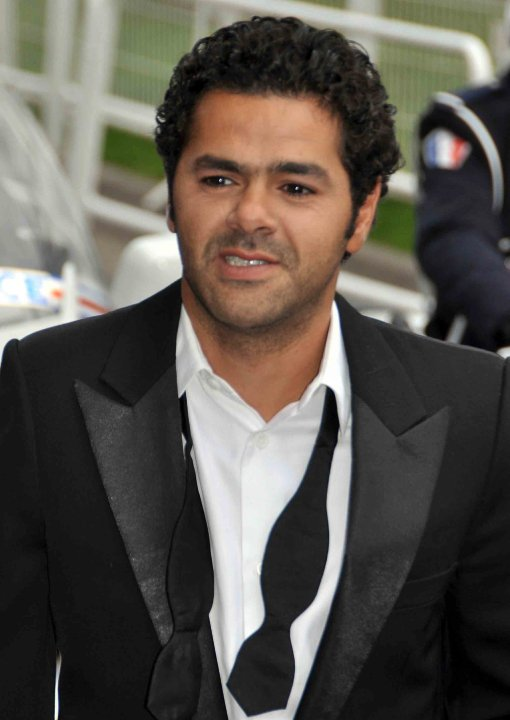
Jamel Debbouze

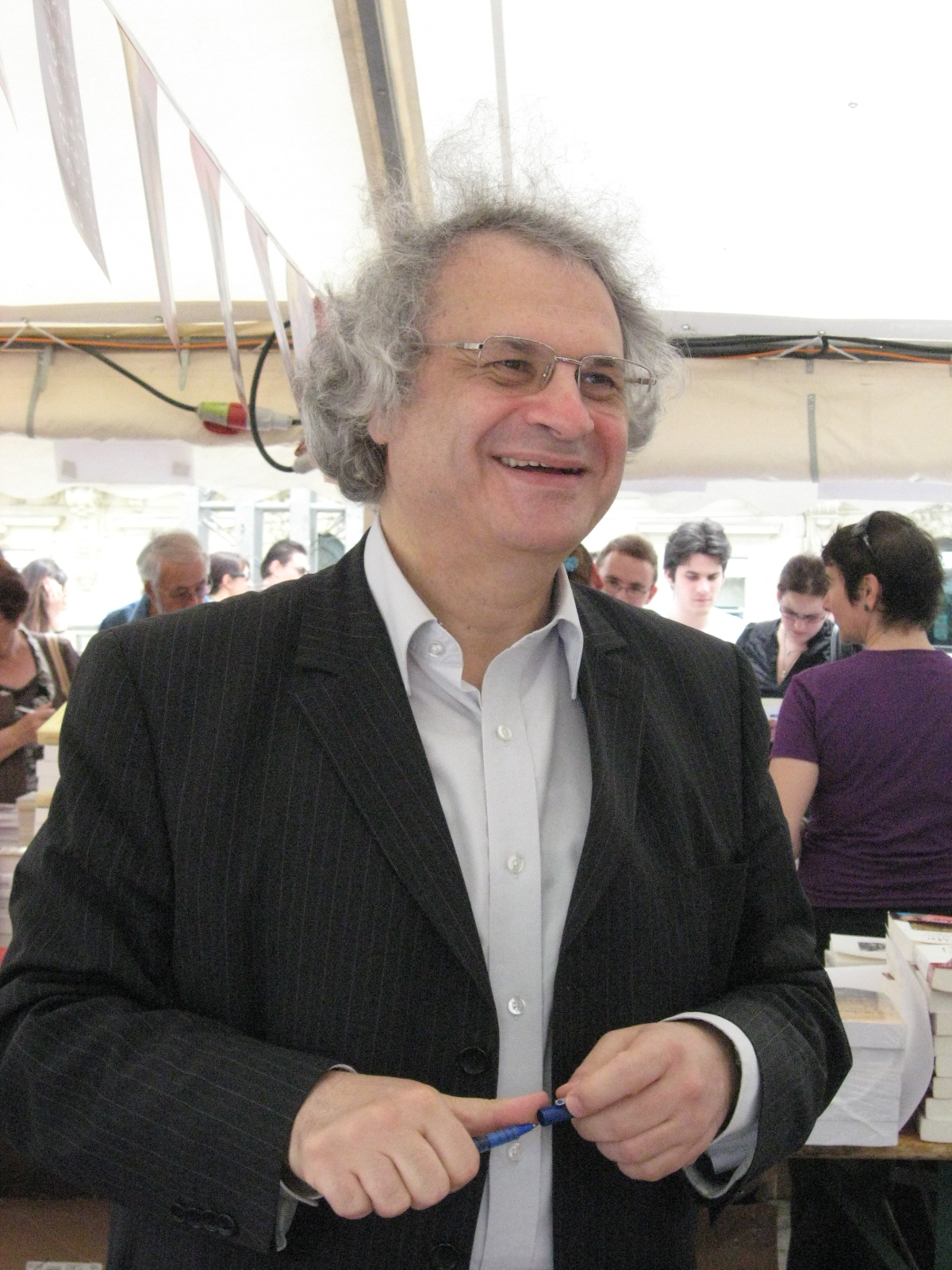
Amin Maalouf

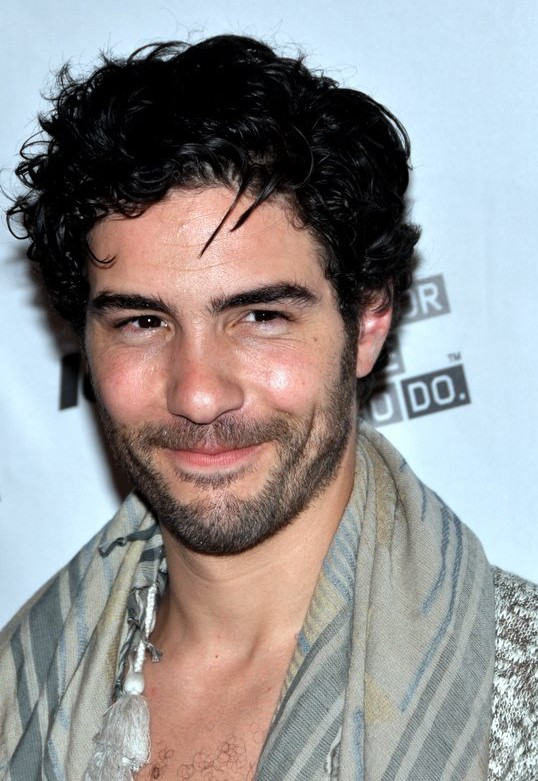
Tahar Rahim

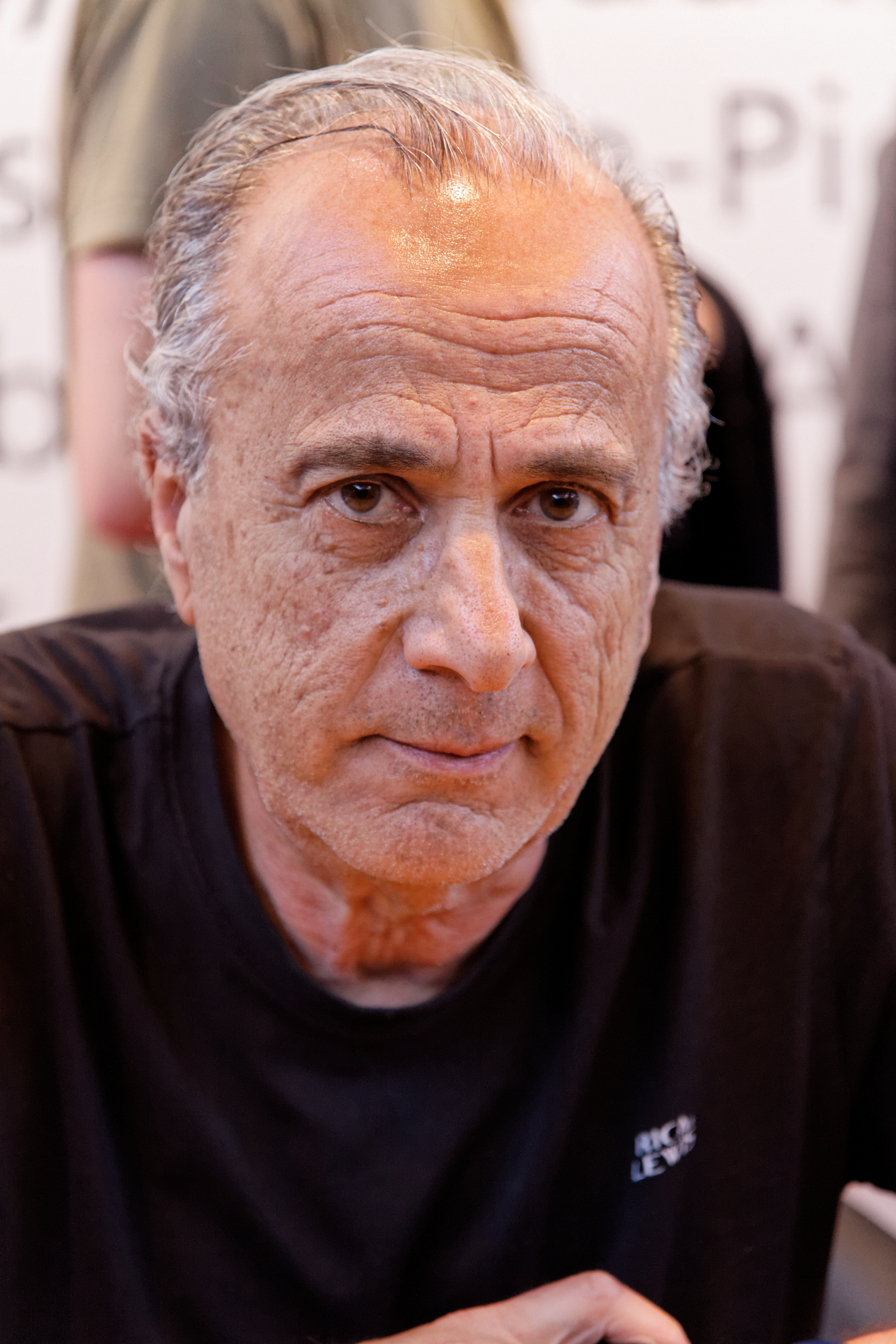
Édika

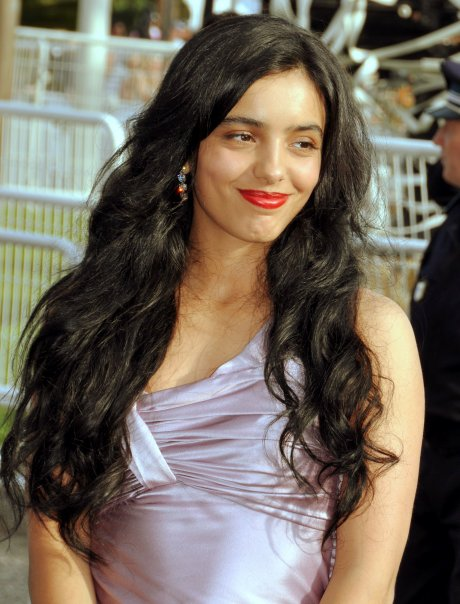
Hafsia Herzi

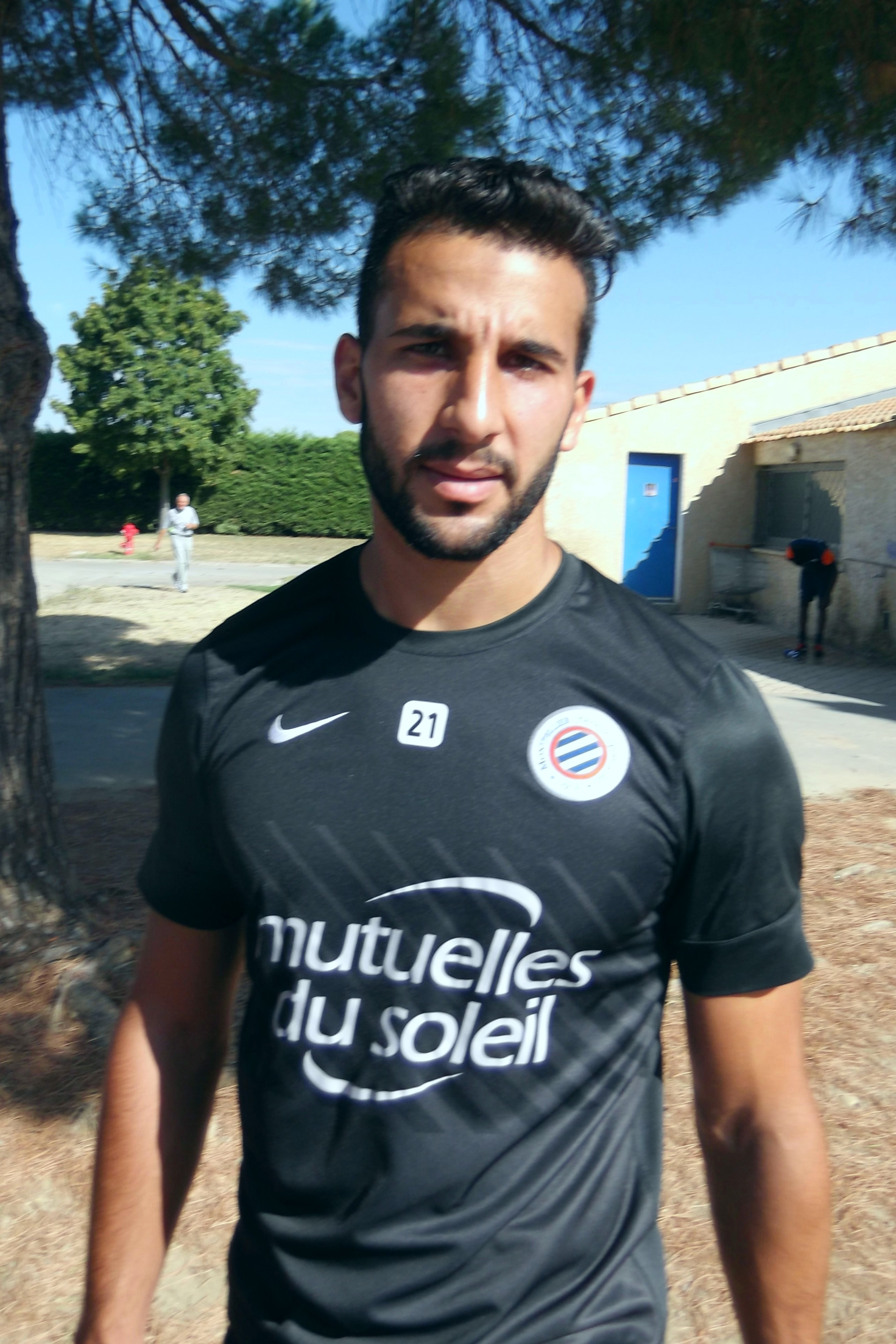
Abdelhamid El Kaoutari

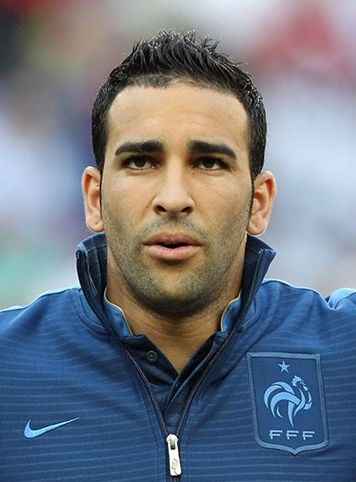
Adil Rami

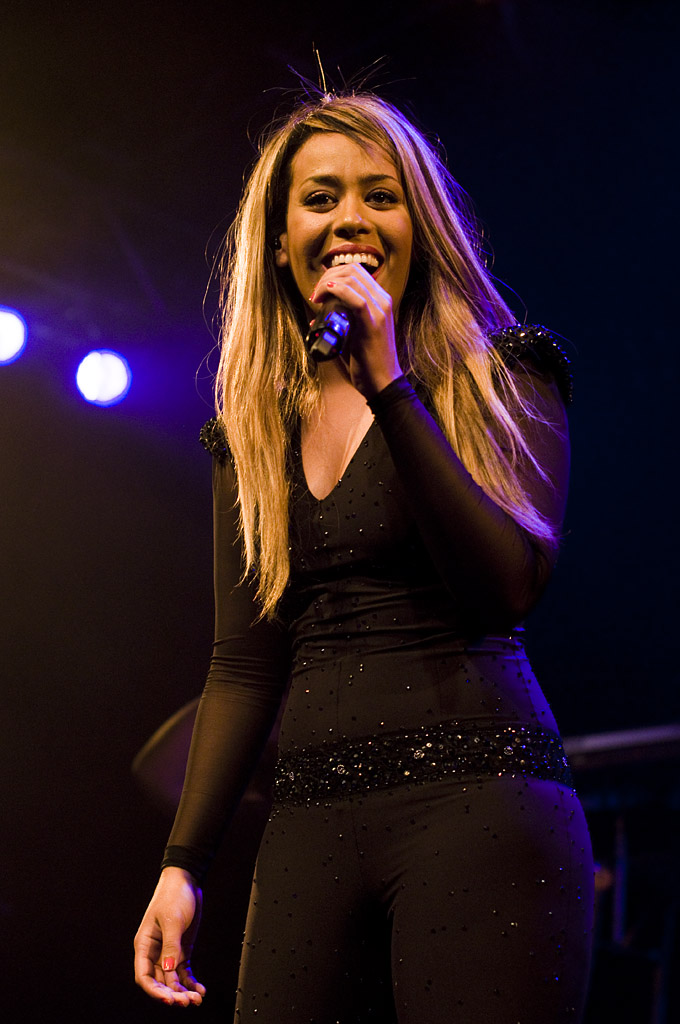
Amel Bent

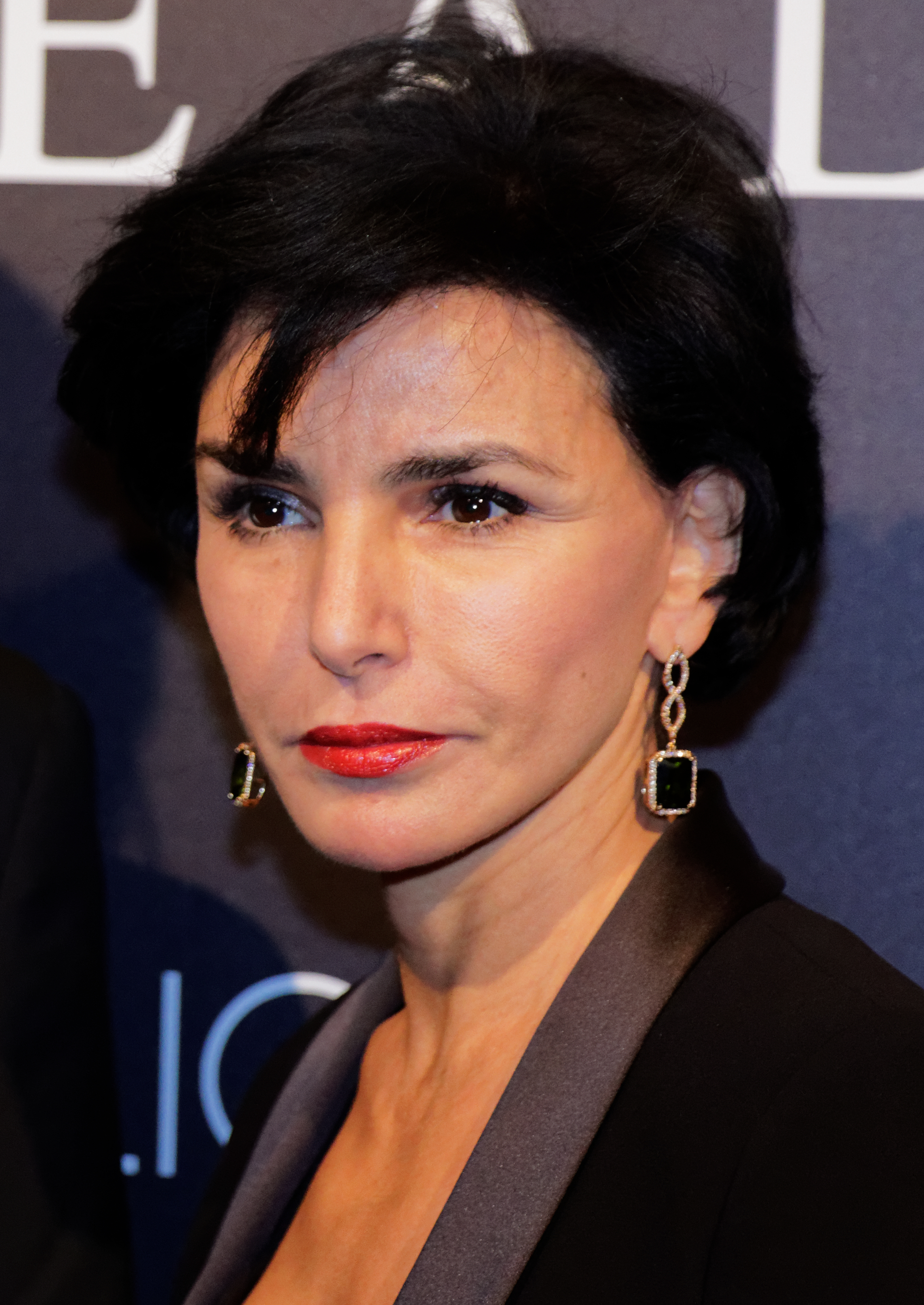
Rachida Dati

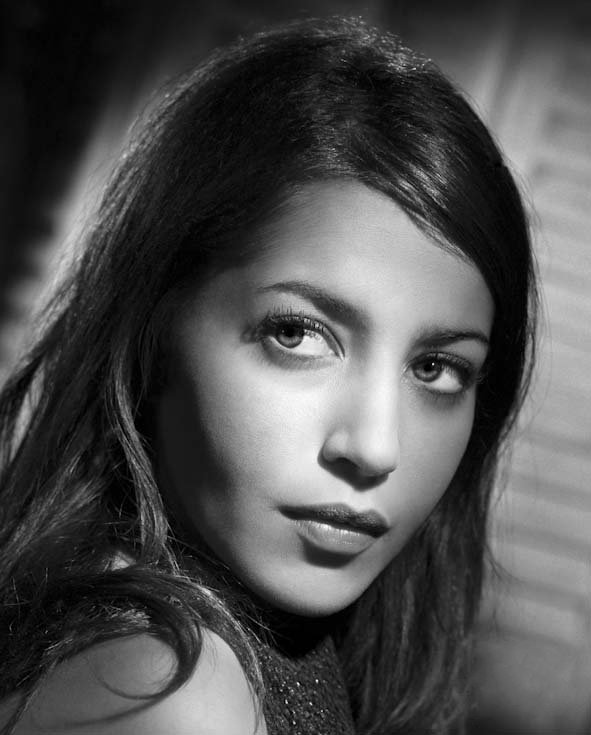
Leïla Bekhti

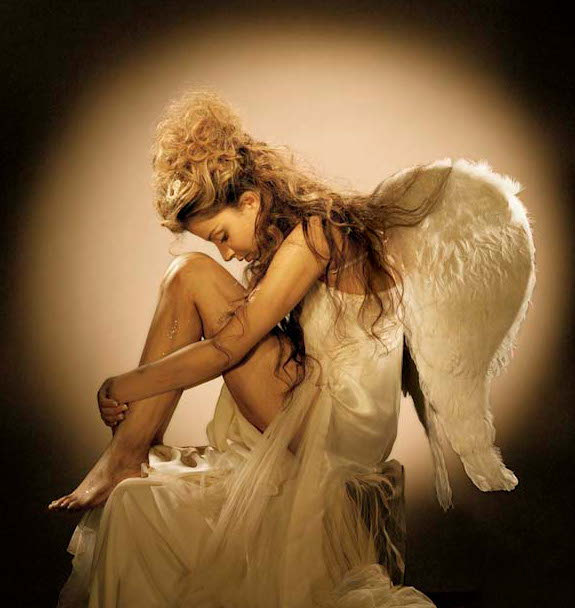
Najoua Belyzel

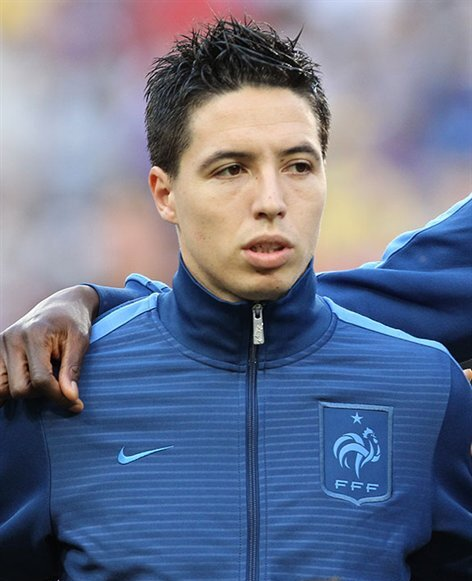
Samir Nasri

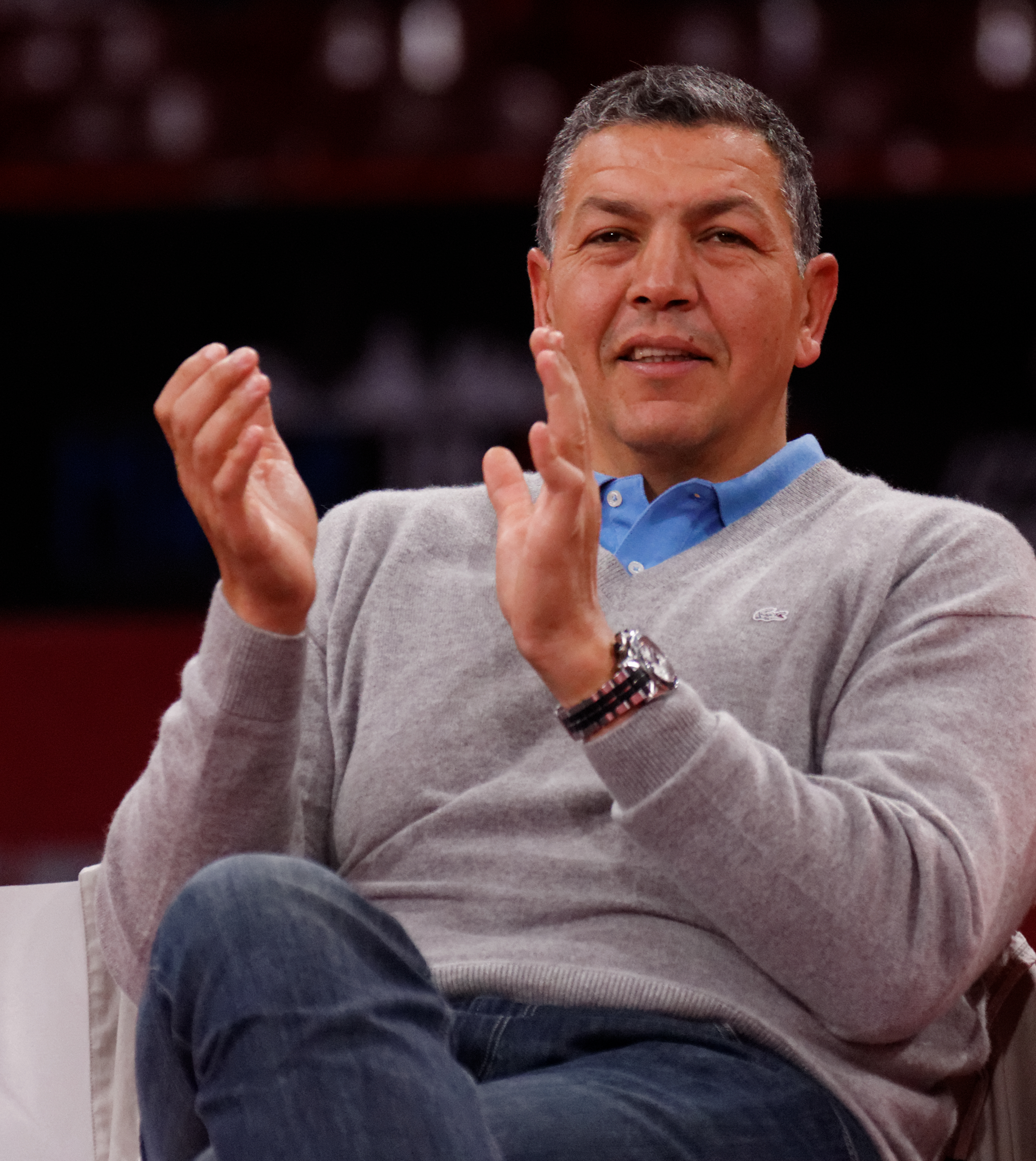
Abdelatif Benazzi

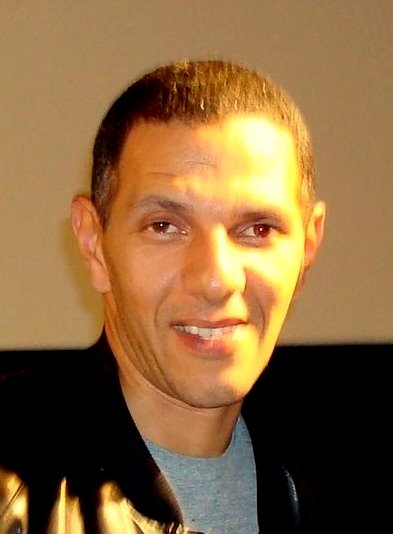
Roschdy Zem

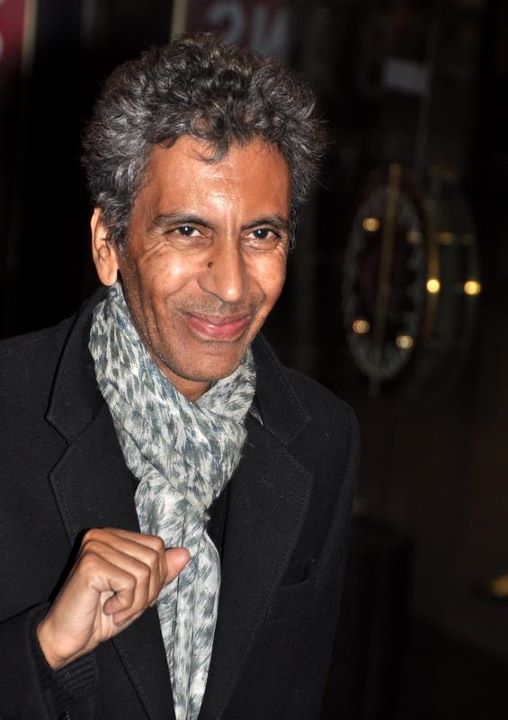
Rachid Bouchareb

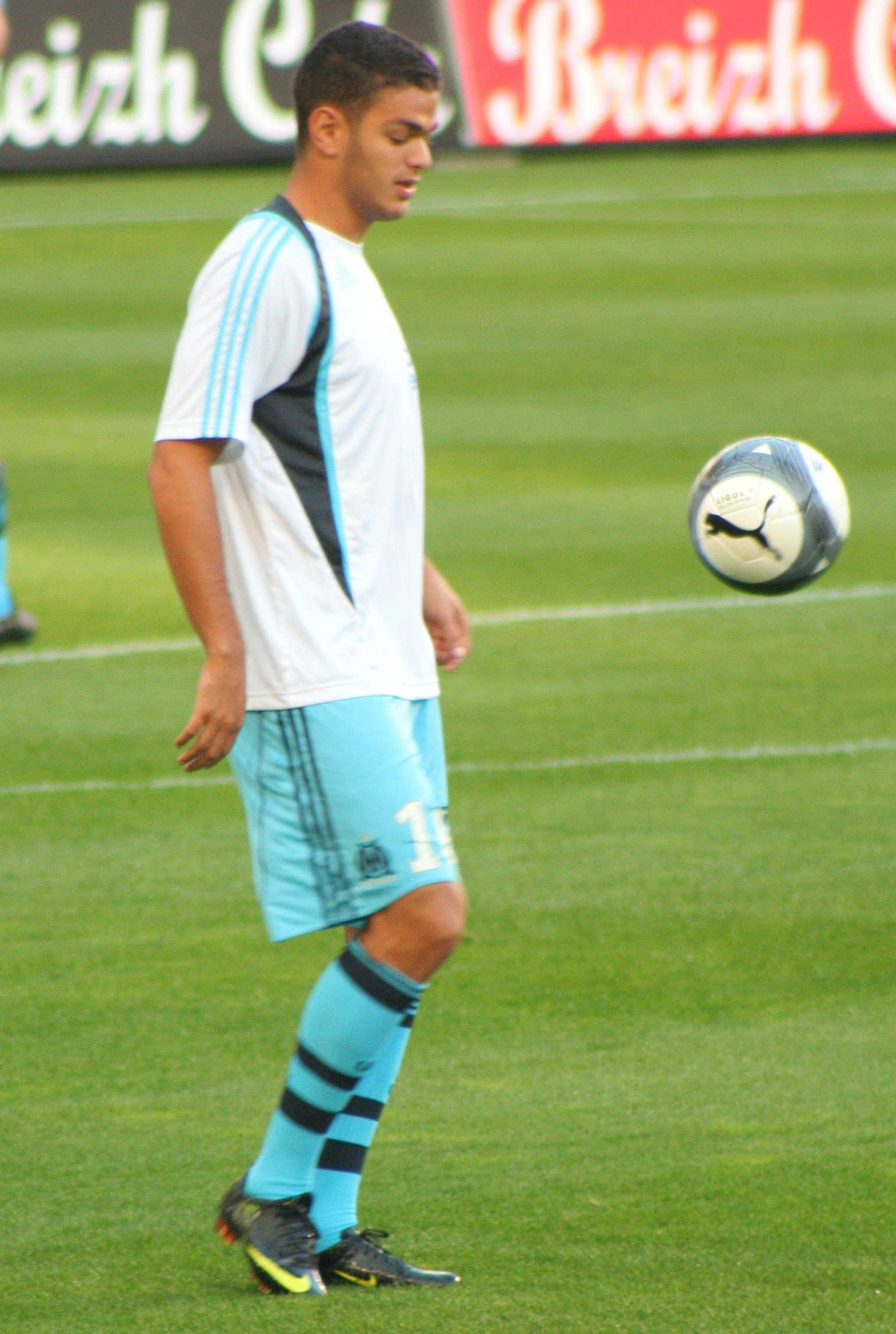
Hatem Ben Arfa

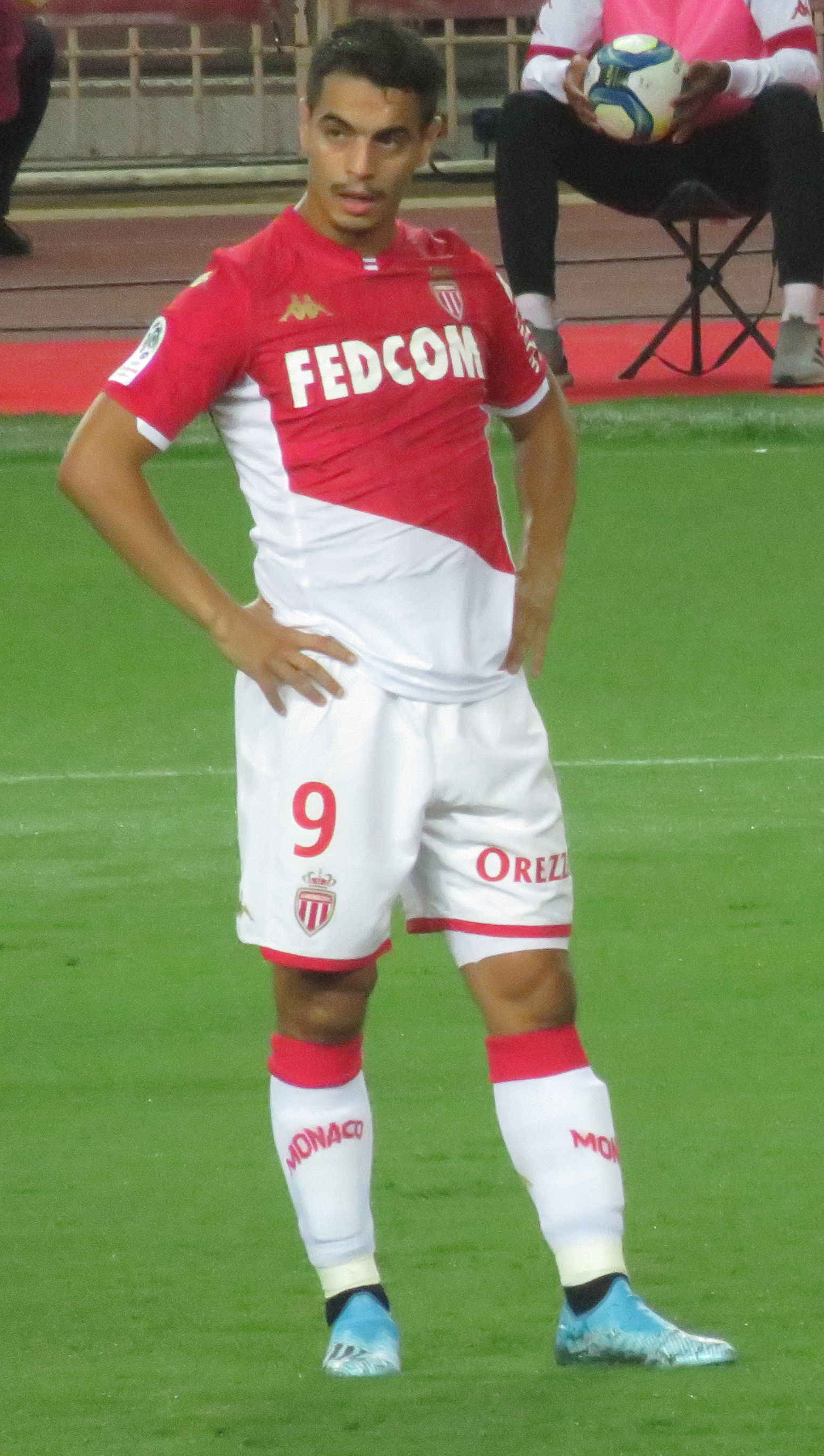
Wissam Ben Yedder

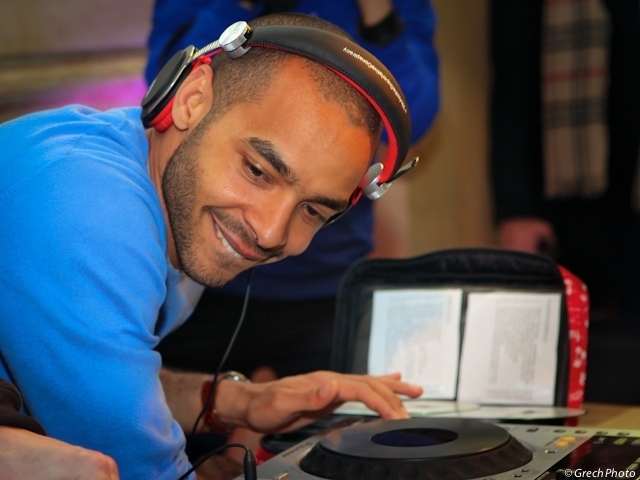
DJ Mehdi

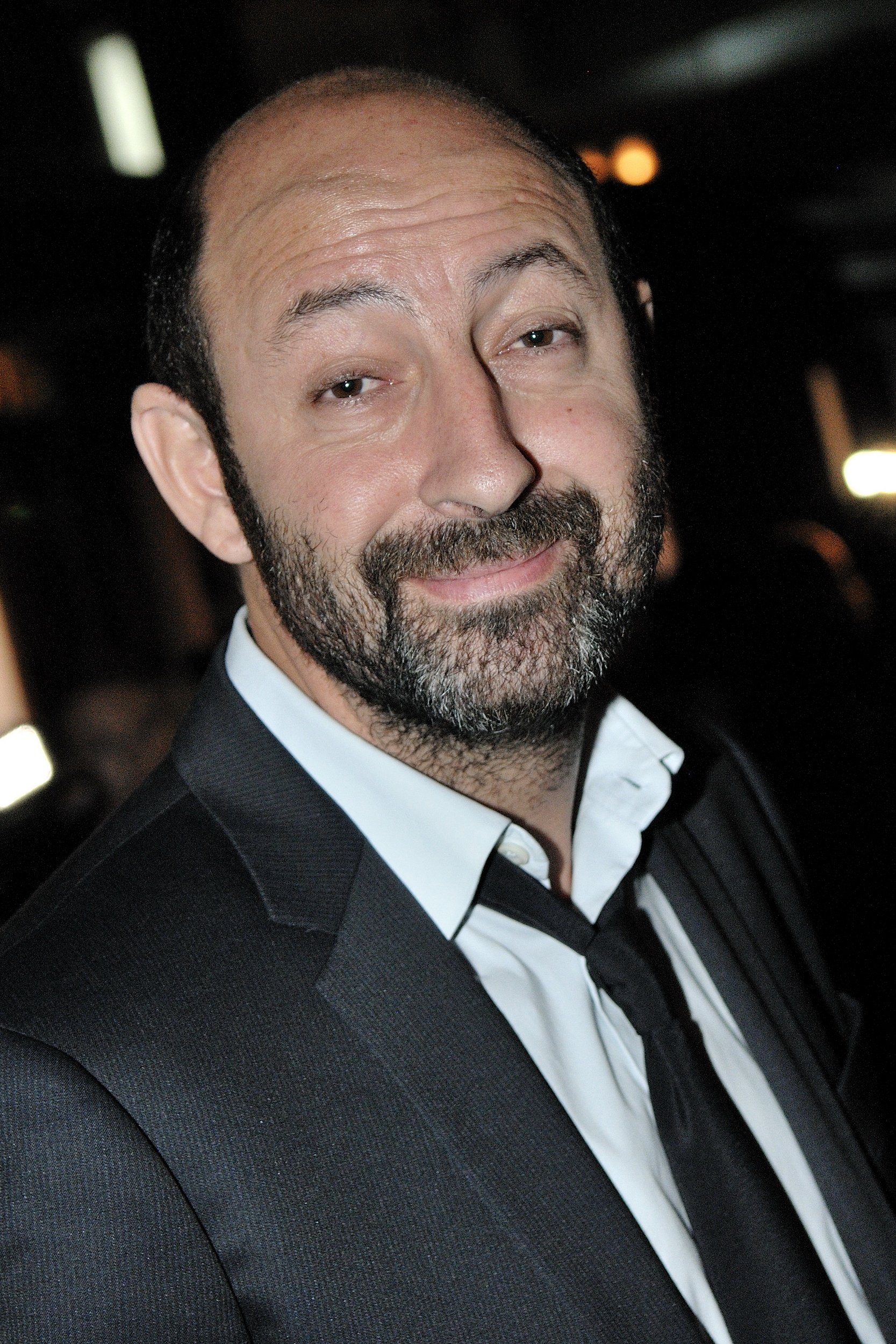
Kad Merad

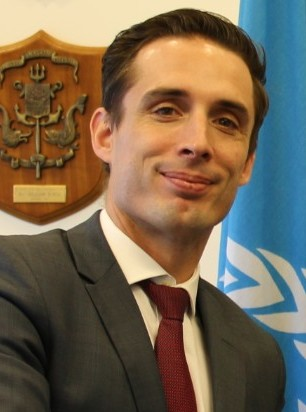
Jean-Baptiste Djebbari

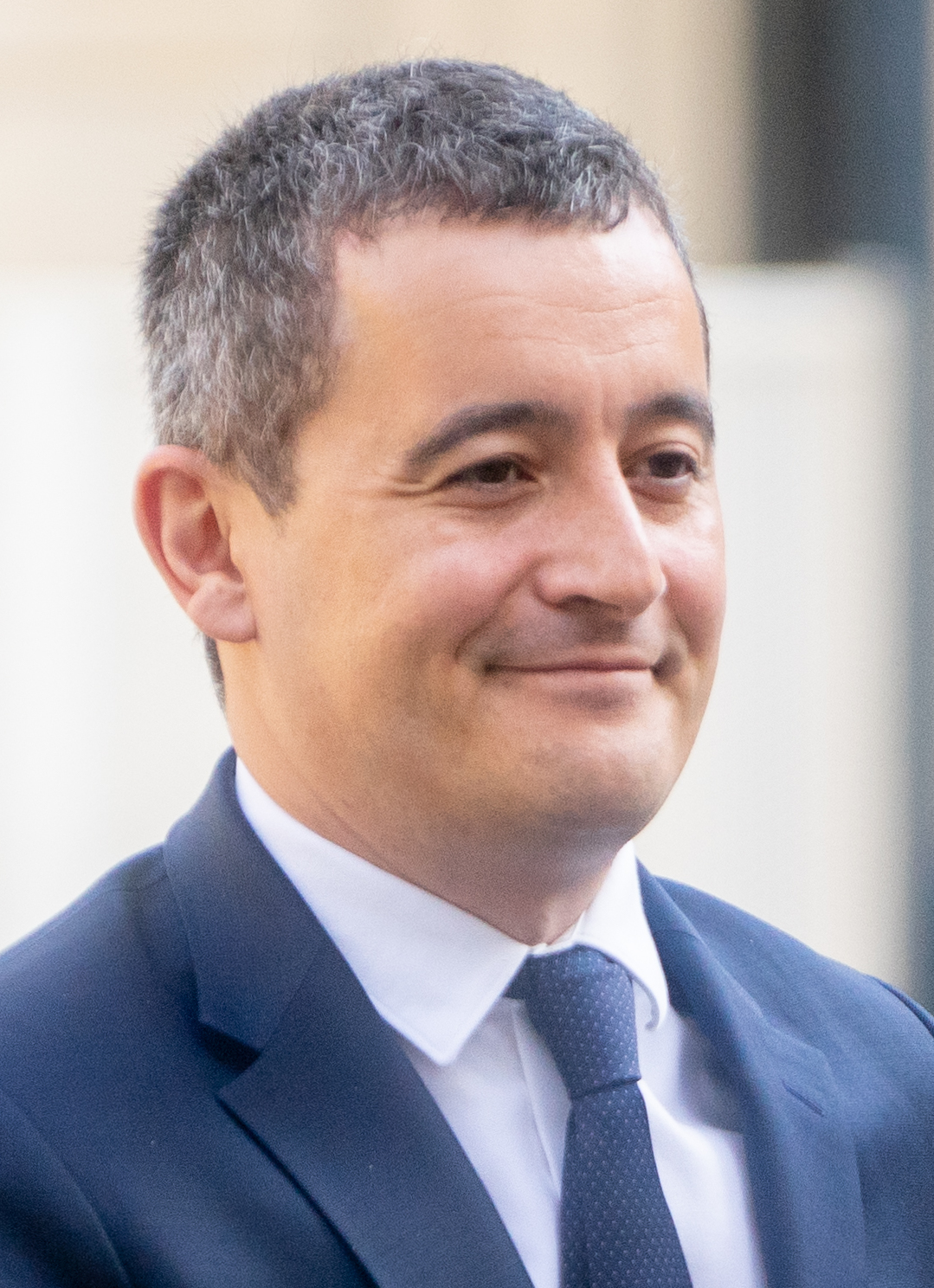
Gérald Darmanin

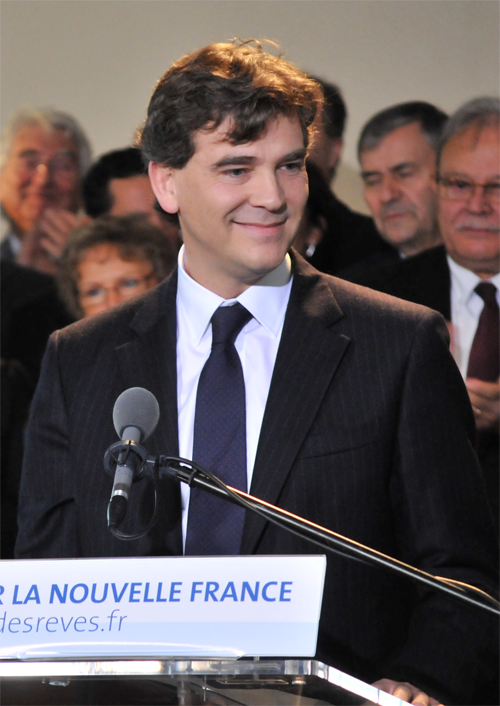
Arnaud Montebourg

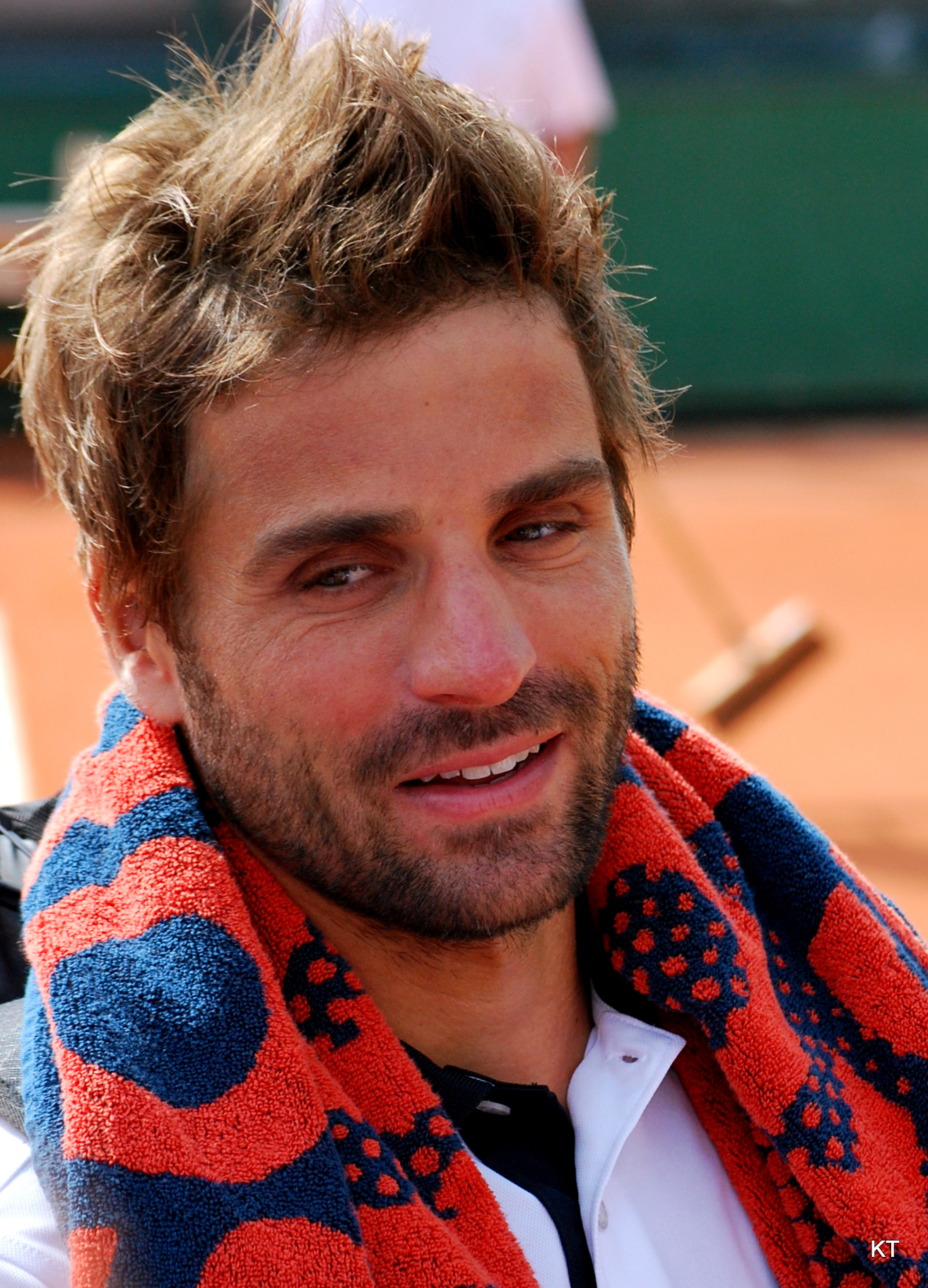
Arnaud Clément

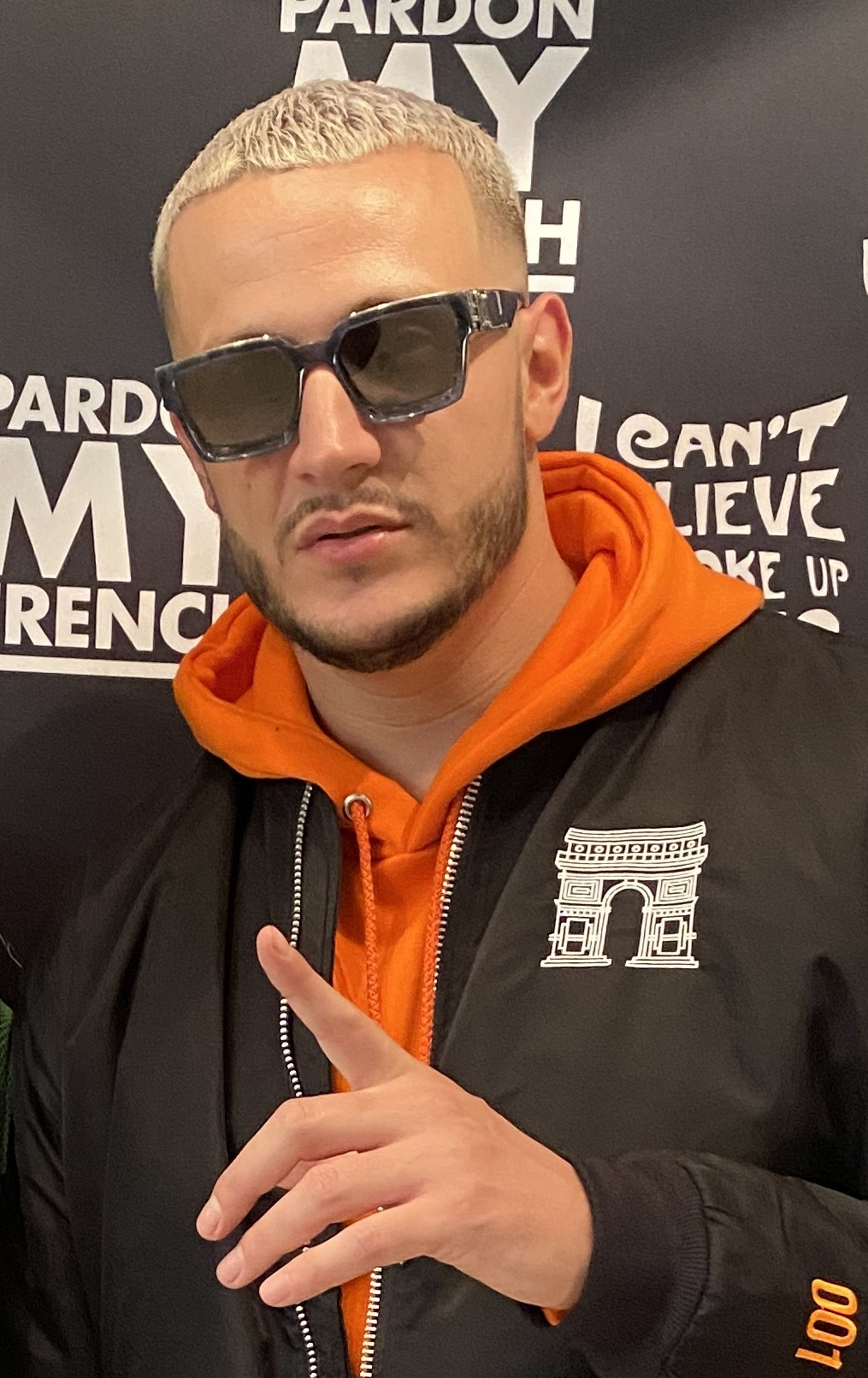
DJ Snake

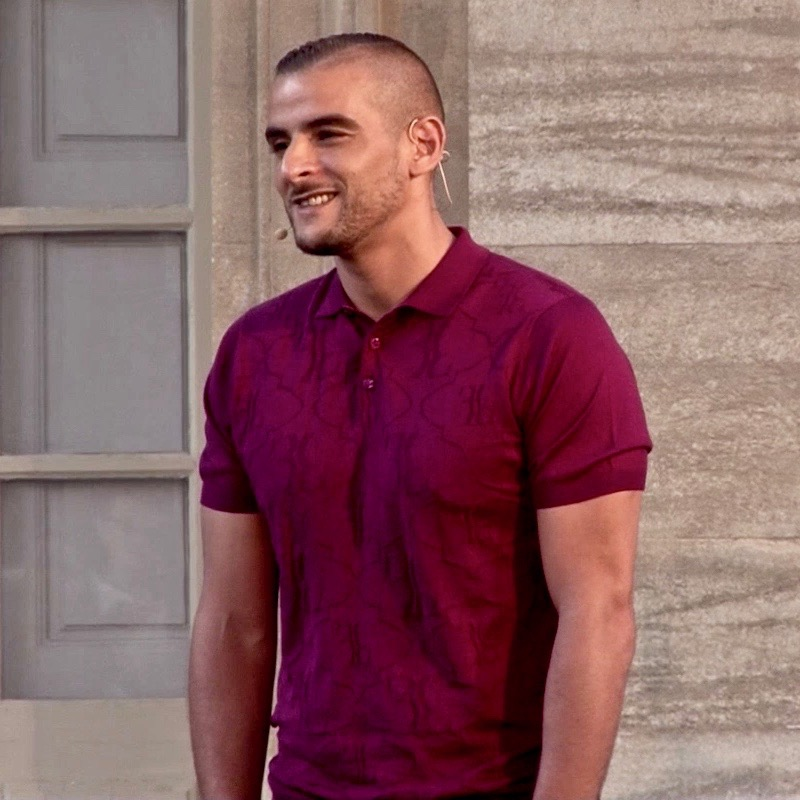
Sofiane (rapper)

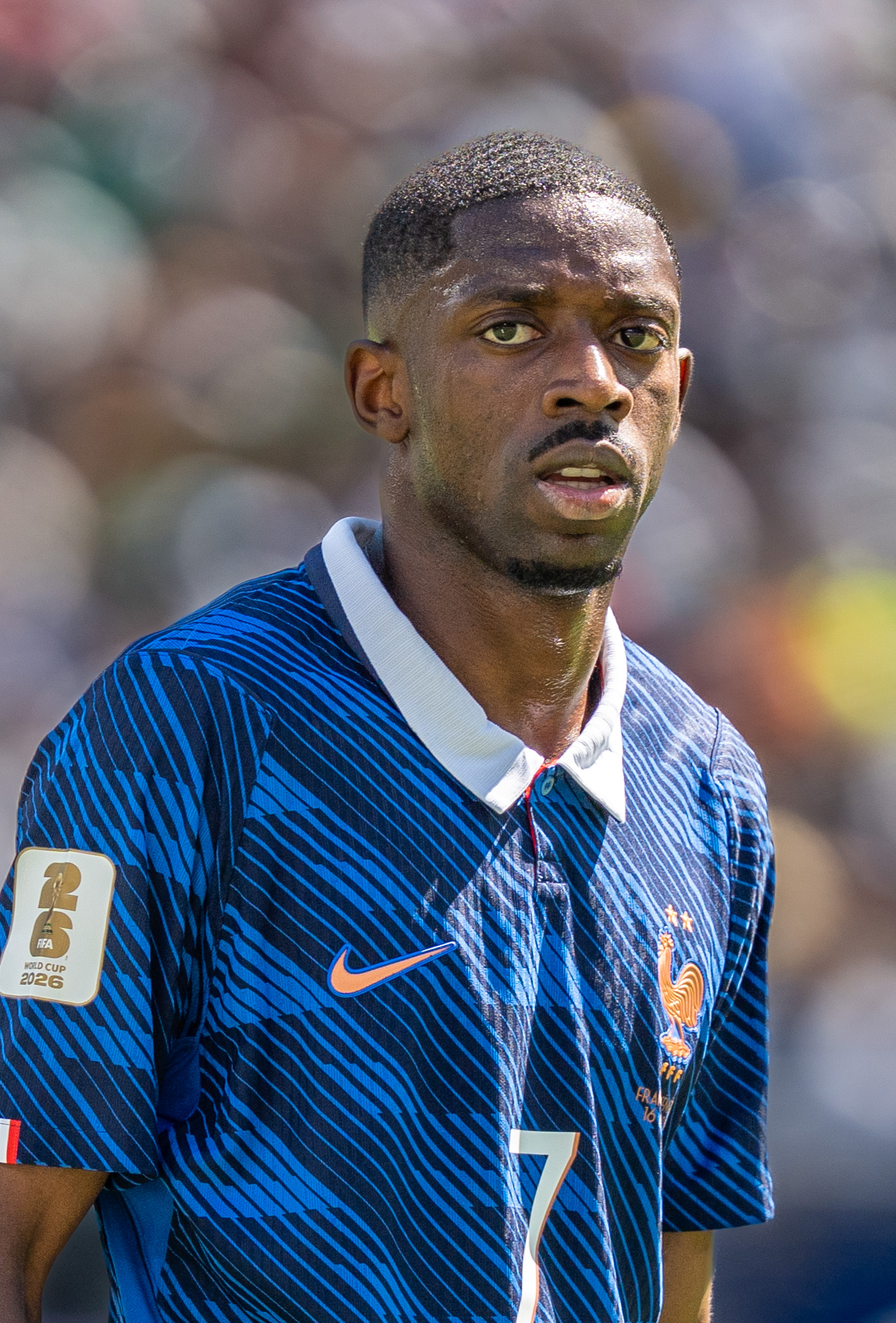
Ousmane Dembélé

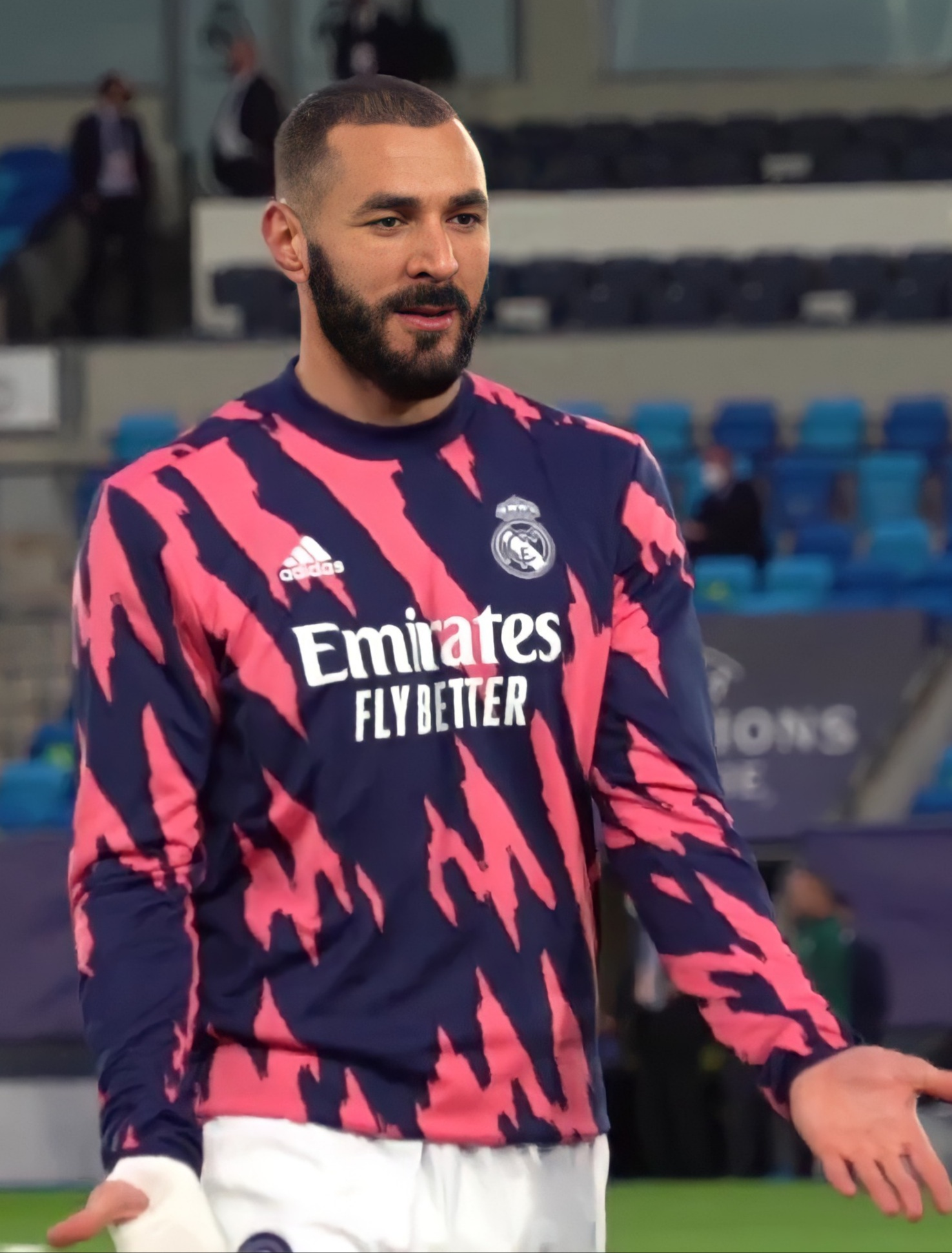
Karim Benzema

== Maghrebis ==
Many notable French people have Maghrebi ancestry since Arabs in France are predominantly Maghrebis.

=== Politics ===
- Arnaud Montebourg, politician, former Minister of the Economy, and candidate for the Socialist Party's presidential nomination
- Azouz Begag, sociologist and politician for various parties, e.g. Mouvement Démocrate
- Kader Arif, former Minister of Veterans and current Member of the European Parliament
- Bariza Khiari, Member of the French Senate (Socialist Party)
- Myriam El Khomri, Minister of Labor (Socialist Party)
- Rachida Dati, Member of the European Parliament, Mayor of the 7th arrondissement of Paris and former Minister of Justice (Union for a Popular Movement)

=== Writers ===
- Tahar Ben Jelloun, Prix Goncourt laureate

=== Media ===
- Karim Rissouli, TV presenter of political show C politique
- Cyril Hannouna, talk show host and television personality

=== Entertainment ===
Fashion

- Hedi Slimane, former head designer of Yves Saint-Laurent

Cinema

- Tahar Rahim, actor
- Dany Boon, actor, comedian, and filmmaker
- Hafsia Herzi, actress
- Abdellatif Kechiche, filmmaker, actor and screenwriter; Palme d'Or laureate
- Roschdy Zem, award-winning actor
- Leïla Bekhti, actress
- Ismaël Ferroukhi, film director
- Kad Merad, award-winning actor, comedian, and film director
- Rachid Bouchareb, film director
- Nabil Ayouch, film director and producer
- Sabrina Ouazani, actress
- Jamel Debbouze, actor, comedian, film director
- Yasmine Belmadi, actor
- Ramzy Bedia, actor
- Salim Kéchiouche, actor
- Rayane Bensetti, actor
- Kays Benouadah, actor LGBTQ+ defender

Music

- L'Algerino
- DJ Mehdi
- Nej'
- Cheb Khaled
- Wallen
- Amel Bent
- Amina Annabi
- Indila
- Najoua Belyzel
- Kayna Samet
- Lââm
- Chico Bouchikhi
- Rachid Taha
- Faudel
- DJ Abdel
- Freeman
- Rim'K
- Mister You
- Niro
- Tunisiano
- Ali
- Médine
- La Fouine
- Nessbeal
- Lacrim
- Kamelanc'
- Sinik

=== Sports ===
- Adil Rami, football player for AC Milan
- Amine Adli
- Amine Harit
- Chaouki Ben Saada
- Samir Nasri, football player for Manchester City
- Mehdi Benatia, football player for Bayern Munich
- Hatem Ben Arfa, football player for Newcastle United
- Mahiedine Mekhissi-Benabbad, middle-distance runner
- Bouabdellah Tahri, middle-distance and long-distance runner
- Féthi Harek
- Habib Bellaïd
- Himad Abdelli
- Houssem Aouar
- Idriss Saadi
- Ismaël Bennacer
- Ismaël Gharbi
- Kays Ruiz-Atil
- Kevin Malcuit
- Matteo Guendouzi
- Mounir Chouiar
- Noah Fatar
- Rayan Aït-Nouri
- Samir Hadji
- Samir Malcuit
- Younes Belhanda
- Zinedine Zidane, football player on the France National Team
- Jawed Kalai
- Karim Benzema, football player on the France National Team
- Karim Soltani
- Karim Ziani
- Kylian Mbappe
- Ryad Boudebouz
- Wahbi Khazri
- Yacine Adli
- Yassine Jebbour
- Yohan Benalouane
- Younes Kaboul
- Kaylia Nemour, Olympic gymnast
- Samir Aït Saïd, Olympic gymnast

== Levantine ==
Many notable French people are of Levantine ancestry.

=== Politics ===
- Éric Besson, politician
- Élie Aboud, Member of the National Assembly (Union for a Popular Movement)
- Henri Jibrayel, Member of the National Assembly (Socialist Party)
- Antoine Karam, French Guiana's representative in the French Senate (Socialist Party)
- Rima Hassan, Member of the European Parliament (La France Insoumise)
- Serge Ayoub

=== Business ===
- Carlos Ghosn
- Mohed Altrad
- Mansour Ojjeh
- Jacques Saadé
- Michel Chalhoub
- Édouard de Rothschild

=== Scientists ===
- André Choulika
- Eid Hourany

=== Journalism ===
- Antoine Sfeir
- Léa Salamé, journalist and political commentator

=== Architecture ===
- Nabil Gholam

=== Writers ===
- Joyce Mansour, surrealist poet
- Andrée Chedid, novelist; Prix Goncourt laureate
- Amin Maalouf
- Gilbert Achcar

=== Entertainment ===
Cinema

- Philippe Aractingi
- Thomas Langmann
- Jean-Pierre Rassam
- Julien Rassam

Music

- Matthieu Chedid
- RAmez
- Abdel Rahman El Bacha
- Ibrahim Maalouf
- Louis Chedid
- Guy Béart

Fashion

- Reem Acra

=== Sports ===
- Ali Hallab
- Billel Omrani
- Rayan Helal
- William Saliba

== See also ==
- Arab diaspora
- Racism in France
- Demographics of France
- Berbers in France
- Lebanese diaspora
- Syrian diaspora
- Tunisian diaspora
- Palestinian diaspora
- Moroccan diaspora
- Iraqi diaspora
- Egyptian diaspora
