= Robert Ménard =

French politician (born 1953)

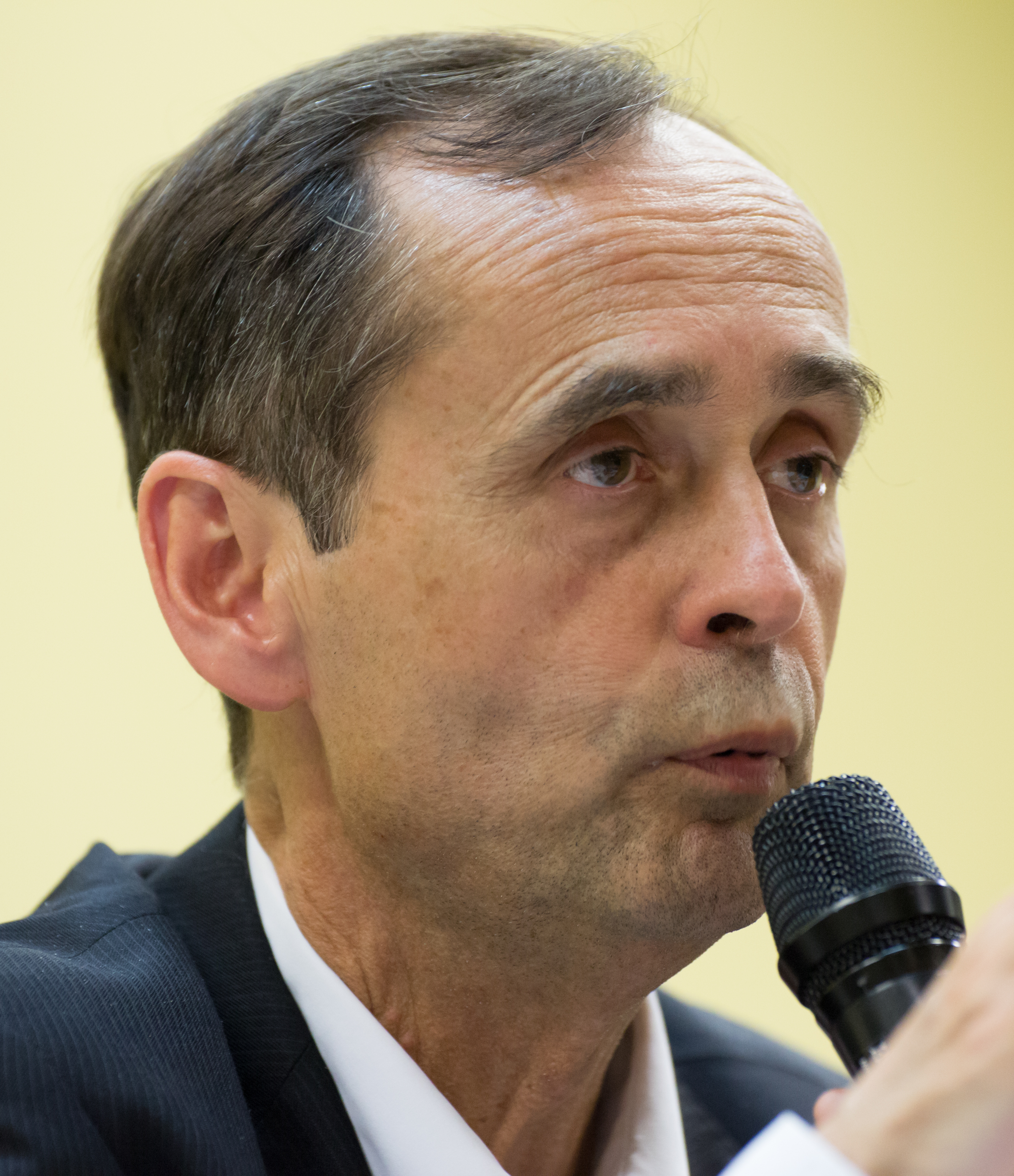
- Ménard in 2015

Mayor of Béziers
- Incumbent
- Assumed office 4 April 2014
- Preceded by: Raymond Couderc

Personal details
- Born: 6 July 1953 (age 73) Oran, French Algeria
- Party: Independent (since 1981)
- Other political affiliations: Revolutionary Communist League (1973–1979); Socialist Party (1979–1981)
- Spouse: Emmanuelle Ménard (m. 2003)
- Children: Three
- Education: University of Montpellier
- Profession: Journalist

Robert Ménard (French: [ʁɔbɛʁ menaʁ]; born 6 July 1953) is a French politician and former journalist who has served as Mayor of Béziers since 2014.

He co-founded the Paris-based international NGO Reporters Without Borders, which he led as its general-secretary from 1985 to 2008. He subsequently participated in the launch of the far-right information website Boulevard Voltaire in 2012. An independent politician since 1981, he was elected to the mayorship of Béziers in 2014. He joined the Les Amoureux de la France alliance in 2017.

== Family and education ==
Ménard comes from a Catholic French Pied-Noir family which settled in Algeria in the 1850s. Around the time of the Independence of Algeria and when he was nine years old, the family moved to Brusque, Aveyron. He studied religion, and planned on becoming a priest.

Ménard's wife, Emmanuelle Ménard (née Duverger), was elected to the National Assembly in the 2017 legislative election as the member for Hérault's 6th constituency. He has one daughter with her and two children from previous relationships. In 2008, he created, with her, the publishing house Mordicus and released a book of interviews between Dieudonné and Bruno Gaccio under the title Can we say everything?, echoing the book by Raoul Vaneigem, Nothing is sacred, everything can be said, criticizing the Gayssot Law, defending the freedom of expression of Holocaust deniers, prefaced by Robert Ménard himself; interviews of Alain Soral in the Medias magazine and of Dieudonné again on Sud Radio, in 2012.

== Media career ==
In 1975, Ménard created the pirate radio station Radio Pomarède and became president of the Association pour la libération des ondes (Association for the liberation of the airwaves). He consequently became the target of many lawsuits, in one of which, François Mitterrand, later President of the French Republic gave a character reference. He later created the free magazine Le Petit biterrois but had to close it down due to a lack of advertisers. In 1985 he co-founded Reporters Without Borders (Reporters sans Frontières).

A Rue89 post claims Ménard became the focus of significant controversy after an interview with France Culture in which in response to a question about the case of the kidnapped journalist Daniel Pearl he made a statement which some have interpreted as saying that the use of torture could be justified in some circumstances. On 24 March 2008 Ménard and two other members of Reporters Without Borders were arrested for attempting to disrupt the lighting of the Olympic Flame prior to the 2008 Summer Olympic Games. The disruption was aimed at protesting the crackdown on Tibetan civil rights activities by the Government of the People's Republic of China.

Ménard resigned from his role as secretary-general of RWB in September 2008 and became director-general of the Doha Center for Media Freedom in Qatar which opened in October 2008. Ménard resigned as director-general in June 2009, complaining of obstruction by officials of the Government of Qatar of the Center's work (notably its criticism of Qatar's restrictive media policies, along with the Center's efforts to bring several persecuted journalists to Qatar for temporary refuge), despite earlier assurances that it would be allowed to operate freely.

On 1 October 2012, he founded, along with Dominique Jamet, the conservative news website Boulevard Voltaire.

== Political career ==
While in college in the 1970s, he became aligned with Trotskyist elements and the Revolutionary Communist League; he later joined the Socialist Party for two years before leaving it in 1981. He would remain an independent thereafter, and would later shift to the political right and/or far-right.

In 2013, he announced he would be a candidate for the position of Mayor of Béziers in the 2014 municipal elections. He launched his campaign with the support of the sovereigntist right-wing party Debout la République. Ménard subsequently welcomed the support of the National Front, which endorsed him as its candidate although he was not a member. His move to the far-right attracted media attention. He described himself publicly as a "reactionary", supporting the reintroduction of the death penalty and objecting to the legalisation of gay marriage in May 2013. He was elected Mayor of Béziers on 30 March in the second round with 47% of the vote.

In April 2014, he imposed a curfew on unaccompanied minors under the age of 13 from 23h to 6h in several districts of the city.

In May 2015, Ménard violated French law by attempting to record the religion of schoolchildren in his city, claiming that 64.9% were Muslim, based on their first names. In September, he visited a refugee complex to tell them that they were not welcome in France, and two months later he declared that no more kebab restaurants would open in Béziers. He promoted the concept of the "Great Replacement" conspiracy theory, created by Renaud Camus and inspired by the ideology of Jean Raspail, which was also used during the 2017 Unite the Right rally in Charlottesville, Virginia in the United States.

In October 2016, he launched a poster campaign claiming that "The state is imposing them on us: That's it, they are coming" in response to an announcement that the French government would be relocating 40 asylum seekers from the Calais Jungle to Béziers.

In March 2018, he announced he would seek a second term in the 2020 municipal elections, running once again as an independent because of disagreements he has with certain policies promoted by the National Front. In May 2018, Ménard was physically attacked and pushed to the ground while visiting Saint-André-de-Cubzac, Gironde to attend a conference, by what he himself called "left-wing fascists". The attacker was later convicted to a suspended prison sentence of four months.

He was reelected as Mayor of Béziers on 2020 with 65% of the vote.

In July 2025, Robert Ménard expressed his shock at the drug trafficking in Bézier, following a night of violence related to drug trafficking, which injured a police officer and caused an apartment fire after being hit by a fireworks mortar.

== Views ==
Ménard supported Marine Le Pen in the 2022 French presidential election. In a 2022 interview with Der Spiegel, he self-described as "an authoritarian mayor" and stated that Le Pen "says things that others don't dare say because they have a bad conscience." In a 2020 interview with CNews, he stated that France needed "a more authoritarian government that knows how to put its foot down."

In 2010, he publicly voiced support for the death penalty stating in an interview on France Inter that he supported capital punishments "in certain cases" and that "supporting the death penalty doesn't make you a monster."

=== Great Replacement ===
Ménard has supported the Great Replacement conspiracy theory. Speaking of the demographics of school children in France, La Croix covered his statement that in one classroom at a school near his home 91% of pupils were "Muslim children", claiming that "obviously it is a problem". Ménard declared that it was "proof of the Great Replacement in progress" in France. He was convicted of "incitement to hatred and discrimination" and ordered to pay €2,000.

== Works ==
- Ménard, Robert (1990). Club des 500 : les 500 qui font le Languedoc-Roussillon. Montpellier: Éditions ensoleillées-Intelligence Média. OCLC 463753984.
- Faes, Géraldine; Ménard, Robert (2001). Ces journalistes que l'on veut faire taire : l'étonnante aventure de Reporters sans frontières. Paris: Albin Michel. ISBN 9782226122131. OCLC 301652528.
- Duverger, Emmanuelle; Ménard, Robert (2003). La censure des bien-pensants. Paris: Albin Michel. ISBN 9782226136145. OCLC 51517129.
- Ménard, Robert (2008). Les jeux de la honte : Pourquoi il faut boycotter la cérémonie d'ouverture des JO de Pékin. Paris: Le Cherche midi.
- Ménard, Robert (2008). Des libertés et autres chinoiseries : de Reporters sans frontières aux JO de Pékin. Paris: Robert Laffont. ISBN 9782221111642. OCLC 471018628.
- Lévy, Elisabeth; Ménard, Robert (2009). Les Français sont-ils antisémites ?. Paris: Editions Mordicus. ISBN 9782918414162. OCLC 463623557.
- Ménard, Robert; Steiner, Thierry (2010). Mirages et cheikhs en blanc : enquête sur la face cachée du Qatar, le coffre-fort de la France. Paris: Editions du Moment. ISBN 9782354170738. OCLC 527339723.
- Duverger, Emmanuelle; Ménard, Robert (2011). Vive Le Pen !. Paris: Éditions Mordicus. ISBN 9782918414278. OCLC 721534013.
- Ménard, Robert; Rolando, Thierry (2012). Vive l'Algérie française !. Paris: Éd. Mordicus. ISBN 9782918414537. OCLC 805044093.
- Ménard, Robert (2016). Abécédaire de la France qui ne veut pas mourir. Paris: Éditions Pierre-Guillaume de Roux.
