= Hérault's 6th constituency =

Constituency of the National Assembly of France

6th constituency of Hérault
- inline Constituency of the National Assembly of France

- Constituency in department

- Location of Hérault in France
- Deputy: Julien Gabarron; RN
- Department: Hérault
- Cantons: (pre-2015) Béziers-1, Béziers-2, Béziers-3 et Béziers-4
- Registered voters: 131,375

The 6th constituency of Hérault is a French legislative constituency in the Hérault département, in the city of Béziers.

== Deputies ==
Election	Member	Party
1988	Alain Barrau	PS
1993	Raymond Couderc	UDF
1997	Alain Barrau	PS
2002	Paul-Henri Cugnenc	UMP
2007	Paul-Henri Cugnenc	UMP
2012	Dolorès Roqué	PS
2012	Élie Aboud	UMP
2017	Emmanuelle Ménard	FN
2022	Emmanuelle Ménard	EXD
2024	Julien Gabarron	RN

== Election results ==
=== 2024 ===
Candidate	Party	Alliance	First round			Second round		
Candidate	Party	Alliance	Votes	%	+/–	Votes	%	+/–
Julien Gabarron	RN		25,563	41.05	new	29,288	47.26	new
Emmanuelle Ménard	EXD		16,968	27.25	-18.51	18,091	29.19	-40.64
Magali Crozier	LFI	NFP	13,126	21.08	+4.03	14,592	23.55	-6.62
Sarah Fatima Daudé-Allaoui	HOR	Ensemble	6,149	9.87	5.75			
Laurent Gilhodes	LO		472	0.76	+0.57			
Votes			62,278	100.00		61,971	100.00	
Valid votes			62,278	97.95	-0.30	61,971	97.27	+4.83
Blank votes			941	1.48	+0.22	1,318	2.07	-3.55
Null votes			363	0.57	+0.08	419	0.66	-1.28
Turnout			63,582	66.97	+21.65	63,708	67.07	+23.77
Abstentions			31,359	33.03	-21.65	31,278	32.93	-23.77
Registered voters			94,941			94,986		
Result			RN GAIN FROM EXD					

=== 2022 ===
Legislative Election 2022: Hérault's 6th constituency
Party	Candidate	Votes	%	±%
EXD	Emmanuelle Ménard	19,136	45.76	N/A
LFI (NUPÉS)	Magali Crozier-Daniel	7,131	17.05	-0.79
LREM (Ensemble)	Mathilde Tastavy	6,530	15.62	−9.11
REC	Henri Fabre-Luce	3,418	8.17	N/A
PRG	Florence Brutus	2,607	6.23	N/A
LR (UDC)	Florence Taillade	936	2.24	−16.04
Others	N/A	2,059		
Turnout		42,562	45.32	−2.26
2nd round result
EXD	Emmanuelle Ménard	26,266	69.83	N/A
LFI (NUPÉS)	Magali Crozier-Daniel	11,341	30.17	N/A
Turnout		37,596	43.30	−2.27
EXD gain from RN				

=== 2017 ===
Candidate	Label	First round		Second round	
Candidate	Label	Votes	%	Votes	%
Emmanuelle Ménard	FN	15,061	35.41	20,640	53.49
Isabelle Voyer	REM	10,515	24.72	17,950	46.51
Élie Aboud	LR	7,777	18.28		
David Garcia	FI	4,212	9.90		
Antonio Fulleda	PS	1,998	4.70		
Nicolas Cossange	PCF	1,377	3.24		
Pierre Verniers	DIV	294	0.69		
Jeannick Rolland	ECO	266	0.63		
Laurent Gilhodes	EXG	234	0.55		
Sébastien Landier	DIV	226	0.53		
José Folgado	EXD	188	0.44		
René Moulin	DVG	146	0.34		
Armelle Luigi	DIV	139	0.33		
Moïsette Bort	DVG	106	0.25		
Votes		42,539	100.00	38,590	100.00
Valid votes		42,539	97.97	38,590	92.80
Blank votes		653	1.50	2,154	5.18
Null votes		230	0.53	842	2.02
Turnout		43,422	47.58	41,586	45.57
Abstentions		47,846	52.42	49,681	54.43
Registered voters		91,268		91,267	
Source: Ministry of the Interior

=== By-election of 2012 ===
The Constitutional Council disallowed the 2012 election, of 10 and 17 June 2012 (Décision n° 2012-4590 AN du 24 octobre 2012). The election of Dolorès Roqué (won by 10 votes) was canceled, and a by-election was held on 9 and 16 December 2012.

By-election of 2012: Hérault 6th - 2nd round
Party	Candidate	Votes	%	±%
UMP	Élie Aboud	20,403	61.91	
PS	Dolorès Roqué	12,553	38.09	
Turnout		34,654	40.11	
UMP hold		Swing		

=== 2012 ===
2012 legislative election in Herault's 6th constituency
Candidate	Party	First round		Second round	
Candidate	Party	Votes	%	Votes	%
Elie Aboud	UMP	16,901	33.62%	20,655	39.80%
Dolores Roque	PS	14,598	29.04%	20,665	39.82%
Guillaume Vouzellaud	FN	11,329	22.54%	10,572	20.37%
Paul Barbazange	FG	3,145	6.26%		
Antonio Fulleda	PS dissident	1,209	2.41%		
André Troise		685	1.36%		
François Perniola	MoDem	596	1.19%		
Florence Brutus	PRG	593	1.18%		
Magali Manus	MEI	287	0.57%		
Philippe Nas	AEI	248	0.49%		
Denis Cantournet	POC	246	0.49%		
Nicole Lescure	AC	162	0.32%		
Laurent Gilhodes	LO	157	0.31%		
Natacha Davot		109	0.22%		
Didier Ribo		2	0.00%		
Valid votes		50,267	98.53%	51,892	98.72%
Spoilt and null votes		748	1.47%	675	1.28%
Votes cast / turnout		51,015	59.17%	52,567	60.97%
Abstentions		35,202	40.83%	33,650	39.03%
Registered voters		86,217	100.00%	86,217	100.00%

=== 2007 ===
Legislative Election 2007: Hérault's 6th constituency
Party	Candidate	Votes	%	±%
UMP	Paul-Henri Cugnenc	22,709	46.53	
PS	Eliane Bauduin	10,711	21.95	
FN	Guillaume Vouzellaud	3,924	8.04	
MoDem	Dominique Canu	3,320	6.80	
PCF	Paul Barbazange	2,589	5.30	
Far left	Fabienne Broll	1,067	2.19	
LV	Patrice Pollet	1,004	2.06	
Others	N/A	3,481		
Turnout		49,827	59.00	
2nd round result
UMP	Paul-Henri Cugnenc	27,243	57.66	
PS	Eliane Bauduin	20,004	42.34	
Turnout		49,067	58.06	
UMP hold				

=== 2002 ===
Legislative Election 2002: Hérault's 6th constituency
Party	Candidate	Votes	%	±%
UMP	Paul-Henri Cugnenc	15,737	31.32	
PS	Alain Barrau	13,499	26.87	
FN	Francine Lopez Commenge	10,937	21.77	
PCF	Aime Couquet	3,195	6.36	
MPF	Jean-Francois Corbiere	1,399	2.78	
CPNT	Sabine Durand	1,371	2.73	
Others	N/A	4,105		
Turnout		51,426	64.05	
2nd round result
UMP	Paul-Henri Cugnenc	20,917	42.75	
PS	Alain Barrau	18,986	38.80	
FN	Francine Lopez Commenge	9,029	18.45	
Turnout		50,269	62.61	
UMP gain from PS				

=== 1997 ===
Legislative Election 1997: Hérault's 6th constituency
Party	Candidate	Votes	%	±%
UDF	Raymond Couderc	12,970	26.18	
FN	Yves Untereiner	12,487	25.20	
PS	Alain Barrau	12,141	24.51	
PCF	Jean-Michel Rumeau	6,911	13.95	
DVE	François Degans	1,207	2.44	
DVD	Jacqueline Quiles	1,103	2.23	
Others	N/A	2,725		
Turnout		51,932	67.51	
2nd round result
PS	Alain Barrau	23,652	43.53	
UDF	Raymond Couderc	20,043	36.88	
FN	Yves Untereiner	10,646	19.59	
Turnout		56,294	73.18	
PS gain from UDF				

== Sources and References ==
- "Résultats électoraux officiels en France" (in French). 2012.
- "Décision n° 2012-4590 AN du 24 octobre 2012" (in French). 2012.
