= Fontès (surname) =

Fontès is a surname. Notable people with the surname include:

- Georges Fontès (1924–2020), French politician
- René Fontès (1941–2019), French rugby union executive and politician
