= MissJirachi =

French YouTuber (born 1997)

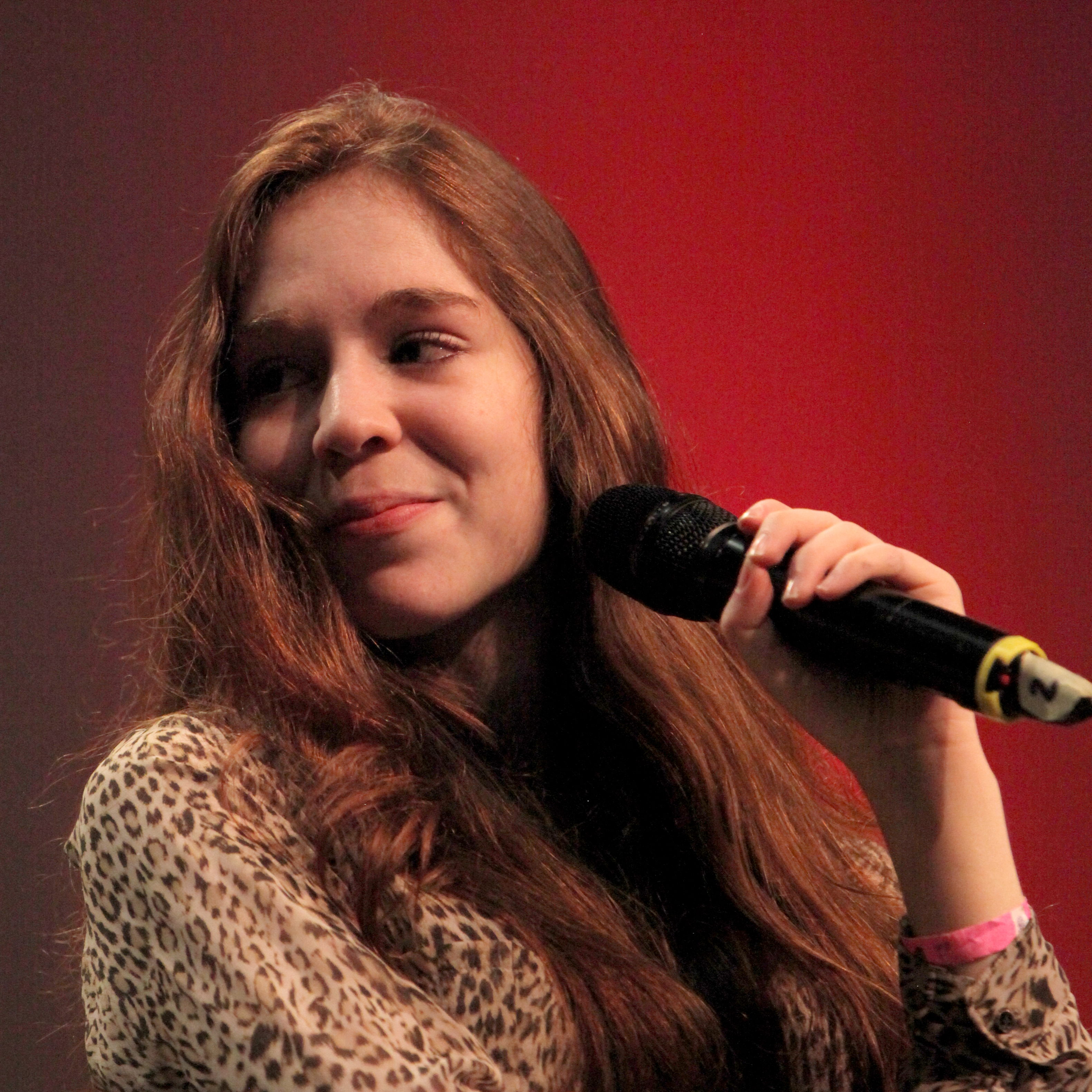
- MissJirachi in 2016
- Born: Élodie Nassar; 19 January 1997 (age 29)
- Occupation: YouTuber
- Partner: David Lafarge (2014–2017)

YouTube information
- Channel: MissJirachi
- Years active: 2013–present
- Genres: Pokémon; vlogging; lifestyle; pop culture; challenges
- Subscribers: 749 thousand
- Views: 161 million
- Last updated: 22 June 2026

Élodie Nassar (French pronunciation: [elɔdi nasaʁ]; born 19 January 1997), known as MissJirachi, is a French YouTuber specialized in the subject of Pokémon.

== Career ==
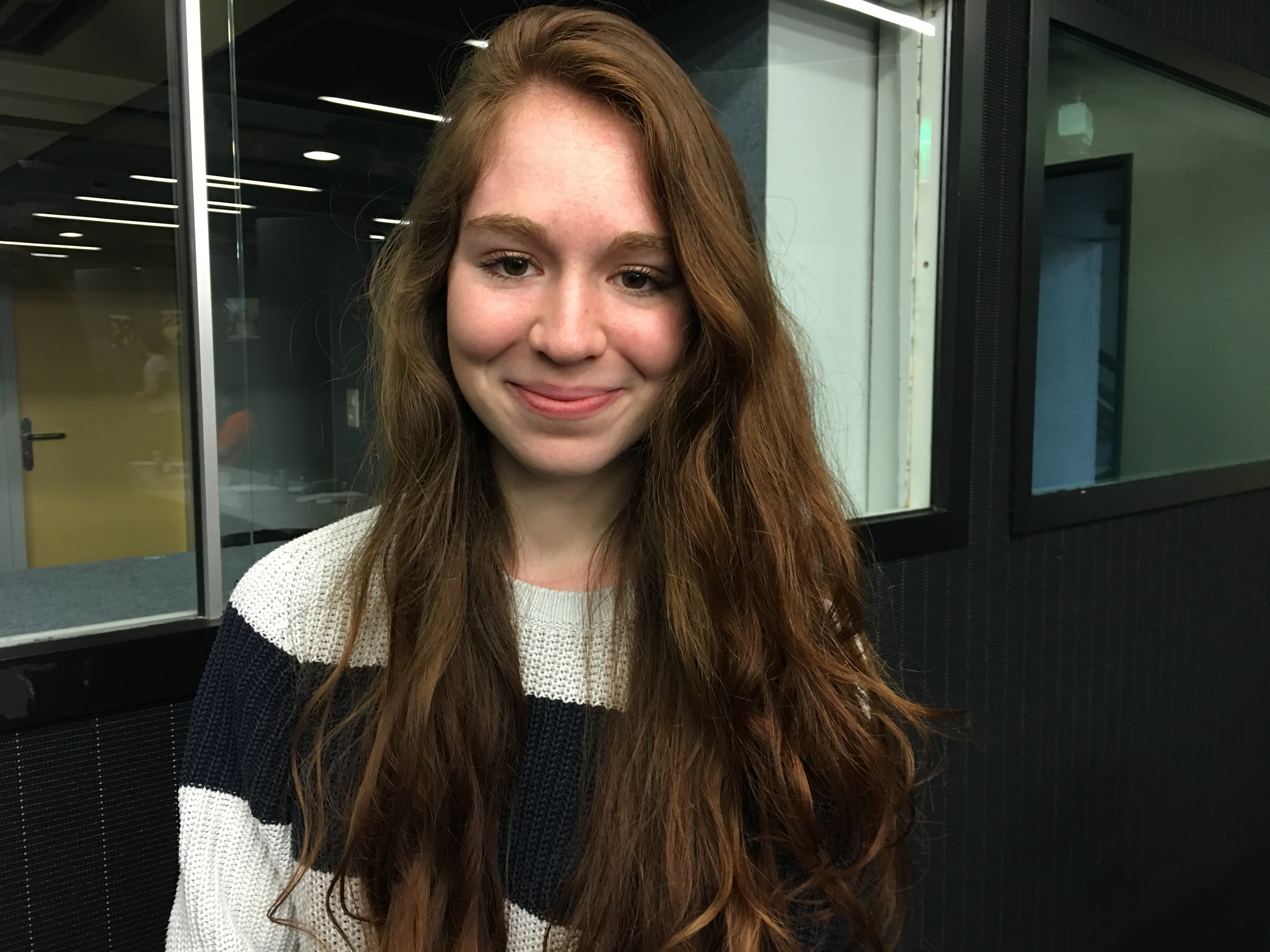
MissJirachi in 2017

MissJirachi started to create videos dedicated to the Pokémon universe on YouTube when she was 15.

In 2014, she partnered with YouTuber David Lafarge, her boyfriend. The couple collaborated on more than 1200 videos, in relation with Pokémon themes, but also on other subjects. Their success is due to the fact they integrated lifestyle YouTuber culture, as well as personal stories in their videos. They often evoked their life as a couple.

In February 2016, as another YouTuber asked her what was the point in creating a TV reality show dedicated to their life couple, MissJirachi explained that her fans identified to them because they seemed "normal", a fact that a more elaborate staging might have spoiled. David Lafarge indicated that on a marketing level, videos tagged done as they were a couple seemed to have better results.

David Lafarge announced their separation on 2 December 2017, while still making videos at her home where he lived.

In 2017, she was chosen by L'Oreal to take part in an online campaign on the theme of women and science.

The French television network Gulli hired her for the Aaaaahhh !!! Le jeu qui vous met la tête à l'envers show.

== Personal life ==
MissJirachi is of Lebanese descent through her father.
