= Emmanuelle Ménard =

French politician

Member of the National Assembly for Hérault's 6th constituency
- In office 21 June 2017 – 9 June 2024
- Preceded by: Élie Aboud
- Succeeded by: Julien Gabarron

Personal details
- Born: Emmanuelle Duverger; 15 August 1968 (age 56); Lille, France
- Political party: Independent
- Spouse: Robert Ménard (m. 2003)
- Occupation: Journalist

Emmanuelle Ménard (née Duverger, born 15 August 1968) is a French journalist and politician who represented the 6th constituency of Hérault in the National Assembly from 2017 to 2024.

== Career ==
=== International Federation for Human Rights ===
A native of Lille, Ménard worked for the International Federation for Human Rights (IFHM), where she led its African bureau. She left the IFHM in 2003.

=== Media ===
In 2008, she created, with her husband, the publishing house Mordicus, and promoted a book of interviews between Dieudonné M'bala M'bala and Bruno Gaccio under the title Can we say everything?, echoing the book by Raoul Vaneigem, Nothing is sacred, everything can be said, criticizing the Gayssot Law, prefaced by Robert Ménard himself. In 2015, she published a book to describe the same law as a "catechism, which like all catechisms is made to be profaned", defending the freedom of expression of Holocaust deniers. In 2011, she co-wrote a book with Ménard titled Vive Le Pen!.

In October 2012, she is the editor-in-chief of the Medias news magazine, co-founded by her husband Robert Ménard, and the conservative Boulevard Voltaire news website in April 2016. She resigned upon her election as a parliamentarian.

=== National Assembly ===
An Independent whose candidacy was supported by the National Front (FN, renamed National Rally in 2018), Debout la France (DLF), the National Centre of Independents and Peasants (CNIP) and the Movement for France (MPF), she largely defeated The Republicans (LR) candidate and outgoing member of the National Assembly Élie Aboud in the 2017 legislative election.

In February 2018, alongside Marie-France Lorho, she proposed a bill which would recognise the 1790s killings in Vendée by troops under the command of the National Convention as war crimes, crimes against humanity and genocide.

In July 2019, as Greta Thunberg visited the National Assembly, Ménard posted the following message on Twitter: "Too bad spanking is prohibited, she deserves a good one". It led to a temporary suspension of her account, after which Ménard stated that "political correctness no longer just makes the law, it pulls out the baton".

She was re-elected to her seat in the 2022 French legislative election. She was defeated in the 2024 French legislative election by Julien Gabarron from the National Rally in the second round in a triangular election.

=== Municipal councillor ===
She took office as a municipal councillor of Béziers on 18 May 2020.

== Views and political positions ==
She has taken position in favour of repealing the Gayssot Act, a law making Holocaust denial illegal.

She has opposed allowing lesbian couples and single women from accessing assisted reproductive technology in the public health care system. She has further stated that "the role of the father and the mother in raising a child are not the same." She is a supporter of La Manif pour tous, a political organisation that has demonstrated against same-sex marriage and allowing LGBT couples to adopt children. She has spoken against abortion, saying in 2020 that "when we talk with women who had abortions, we often see that they were guided towards it without really having the choice."

== Personal life ==
Since 2003, she has been married to conservative politician Robert Ménard, who has been Mayor of Béziers since 2014. She is a practising Catholic.
