= Ramez (rapper) =

- Also known as: RAmez
- Born: Ramzi Khoury; June 3, 1978 (age 47)
- Origin: Lebanese
- Genres: Hip hop
- Occupation: Rapper

Ramzi Khoury (born June 3, 1978), also known as RAmez, is a French rap artist of Lebanese descent. He sings in French, English and Arabic. In 2007 at a time where few people believed French Rap had a place in the Middle East, Ramez makes it to the NRJ Lebanon Top 100 by reaching number 24 with his hit song Leich Heik Baladé a song mixing French and Arabic.

== Discography ==
Albums:

- Le Monde est à refaire2001
- Leich Heik Baladé2007
- Canvas2010

Compilations:

- My world 2001
- Songs from the edge2001
- A trip to Rozz-well2002
- Oto10dakt 2007
