= Julien Gabarron =

French politician (born 1981)

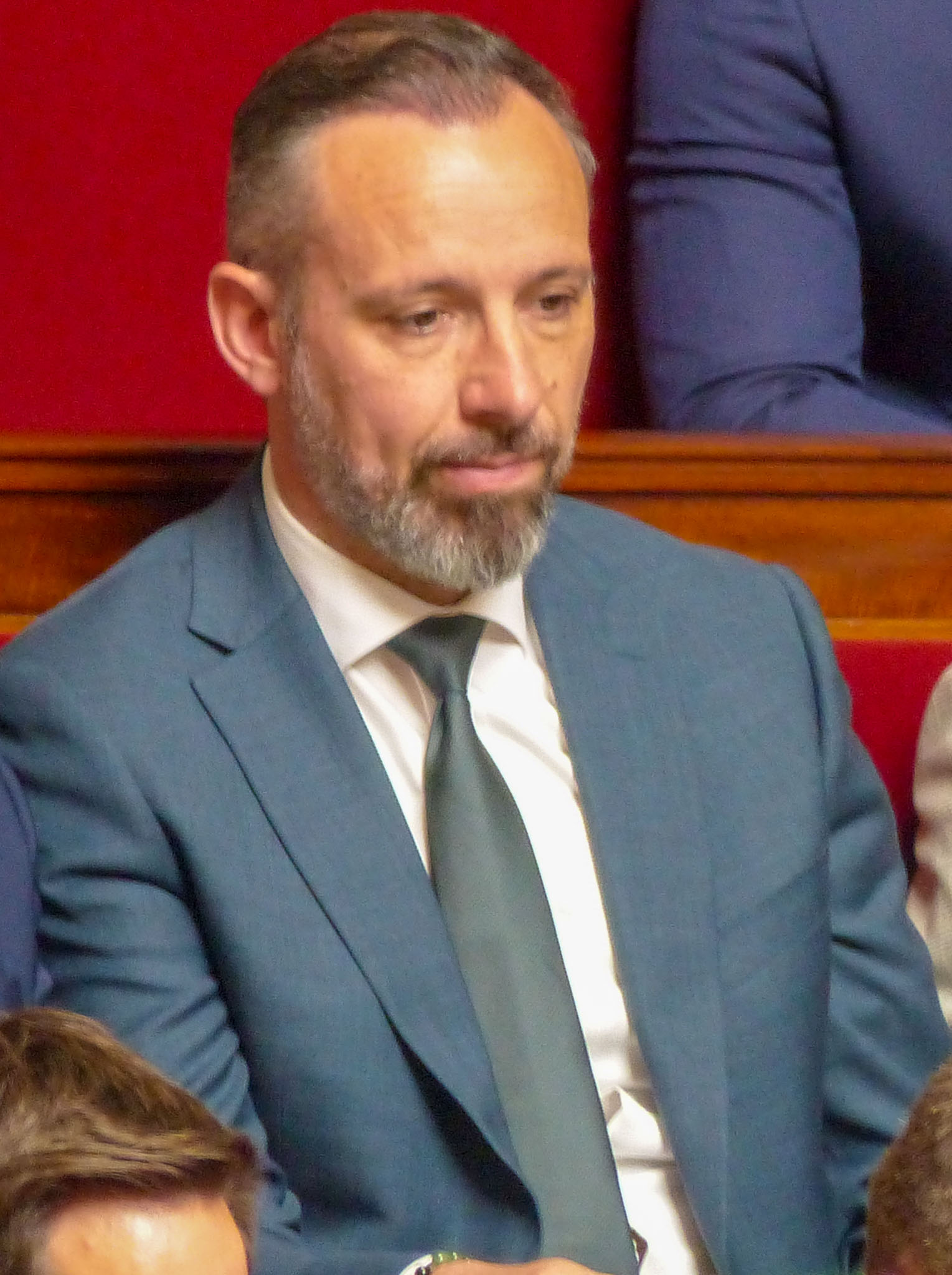

Member of the French National Assembly for Hérault's 6th constituency
- Incumbent
- Assumed office 18 July 2024
- Preceded by: Emmanuelle Ménard

Personal details
- Born: 11 March 1981 (age 45)
- Party: National Rally (since 2021); Union for a Popular Movement (1997–2010)

Julien Gabarron (born 11 March 1981) is a French politician of the National Rally. In the 2024 legislative election, he was elected member of the National Assembly for Hérault's 6th constituency. Since 2023, he has served as leader of the National Rally in Hérault.

Gabarron was born in March, 1981 in Lille. He was a sales executive in IT and a cafe owner in Béziers. Initially a member of the UMP, he joined the RN in 2021. He defeated Emmanuelle Ménard to become a member of the National Assembly for Hérault's 6th constituency in 2024.
