= Élie Aboud =

French-Lebanese politician and doctor

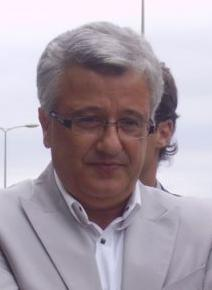

Member of the National Assembly of France
- In office 2007 French legislative election (elected after the death of Paul-Henri Cugnenc) – 19 June 2012
- Preceded by: Paul-Henri Cugnenc
- Succeeded by: Dolorès Roqué
- Constituency: 6th Constituency of Hérault

Personal details
- Born: 12 October 1959 (age 66) Beirut, Lebanon
- Party: Union for a Popular Movement
- Profession: Cardiologist

Élie Aboud (Arabic: ايلي عبود; born 12 October 1959 in Beirut, Lebanon) is a French-Lebanese politician and doctor. As a member of the National Assembly of France, he represents the 6th circonscription of the Hérault department, and is a member of the Les Republicains party. Aboud took up the position after the death of the previous deputy, Paul-Henri Cugnenc on 6 July 2007. He is a member of the Cultural, Family and Social Affairs Committee.

He was elected in 1995 as a City Councillor and served in this post until 2001, when he became eighth Deputy Mayor of Béziers.

He is chairman of "Generation France" Béziers, founded by Jean-François Copé, and is the chairman of parliamentary research groups on repatriates and viticulture.

== Biography ==
Originally from Lebanon, he obtained his high school diploma at the age of sixteen, then moved to France where he enrolled at the University of Montpellier School of Medicine.

Elected representative of Béziers since 1995, he is a close associate of Senator-Mayor Raymond Couderc. He ran in the 2004 cantonal elections in the canton of Béziers-4 but was defeated in the second round of a three-way race by PS candidate Jean-Michel du Plaa.

Deputy for Paul-Henri Cugnenc, he succeeded him upon his death on July 4, 2007, as representative for the 6th district of Hérault in the 13th legislature.

After the 2008 municipal elections in Béziers, which saw Raymond Couderc, the outgoing senator-mayor, re-elected, Élie Aboud became his first deputy.

On February 5, 2013, during the National Assembly's debate on the bill to open marriage to same-sex couples, Élie Aboud referred to the pink triangle, replaced by a “black triangle”: “This is not the pink triangle referred to by a child psychiatrist, but a black triangle with the words ‘SOS Danger’ written on it”; this statement provoked the anger of Minister of Justice Christiane Taubira, who found it “unspeakable”.

On June 17, 2012, he lost his seat in the National Assembly to the socialist Dolorès Roqué, who won by 10 votes in a three-way race with the National Front. Following an appeal he lodged on the grounds that the margin of victory was too small, the election in the 6th constituency of Hérault was annulled. Élie Aboud then became a member of parliament again on December 16, 2012, after winning 61.91% of the vote against Dolorès Roqué.

On March 30, 2014, he lost the three-way race in the municipal elections in Béziers to Robert Ménard, who was supported at the time by the National Rally.

On January 30, 2016, he was elected president of the Hérault Republicans federation.
