= Lebanese people in France =

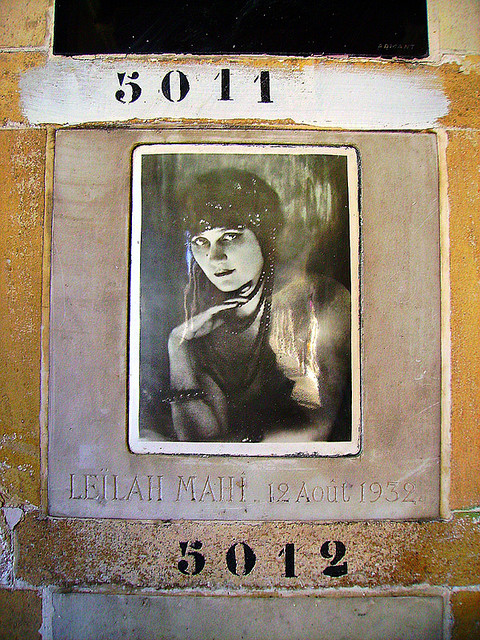

Total population
- 300,000

Regions with significant populations
- Paris, Marseille, Lyon, Bordeaux, Strasbourg, Nice, etc.

Languages
- French, Lebanese Arabic (some also speak Armenian)

Religion
- Majority: Maronite Catholic, Greek Orthodox, Melkite Catholic. Minority: Shia Islam, Sunni Islam, Druze, Atheism

Lebanese people in France include migrants from Lebanon to France, as well as their descendants. Many people left Lebanon because of the Lebanese civil war and wars with Israel as well as various crises in Lebanon.

== Population ==
The Lebanese population in France is estimated to be from 300,000. In 2022, during the Lebanese parliamentary elections, 28,136 Lebanese citizens were registered to vote in France. This represents the largest number of Lebanese registered abroad, ahead of the United States and Canada.

== History ==
Although there has been sporadic migration from the Middle East to France since the 17th century, the real growth of the French Lebanese population began in 1975, with the start of the civil war in Lebanon, which drove thousands of people away. Other wars with Israel, and economic mismangment leading to more economic, political crisis and Lebanon being considered a failed state by some, all of which led to continued emigration. No concrete data exists on the religious affiliations; however, it is commonly assumed that Maronite Christians make up the majority of the Lebanese population in France.

== Notable people ==
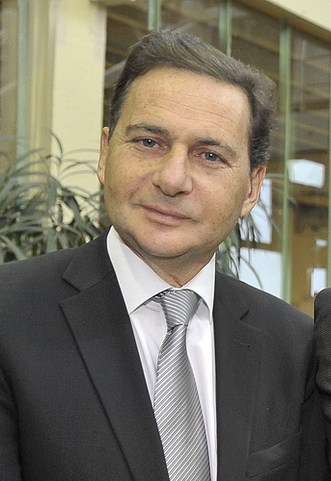
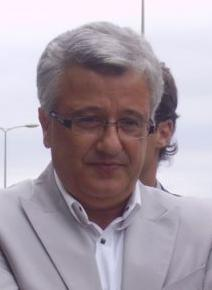
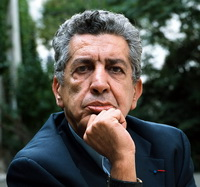
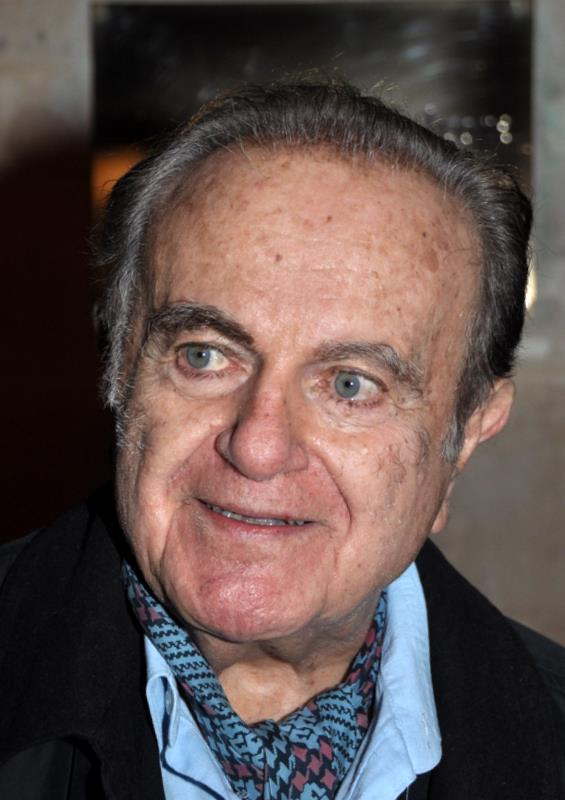
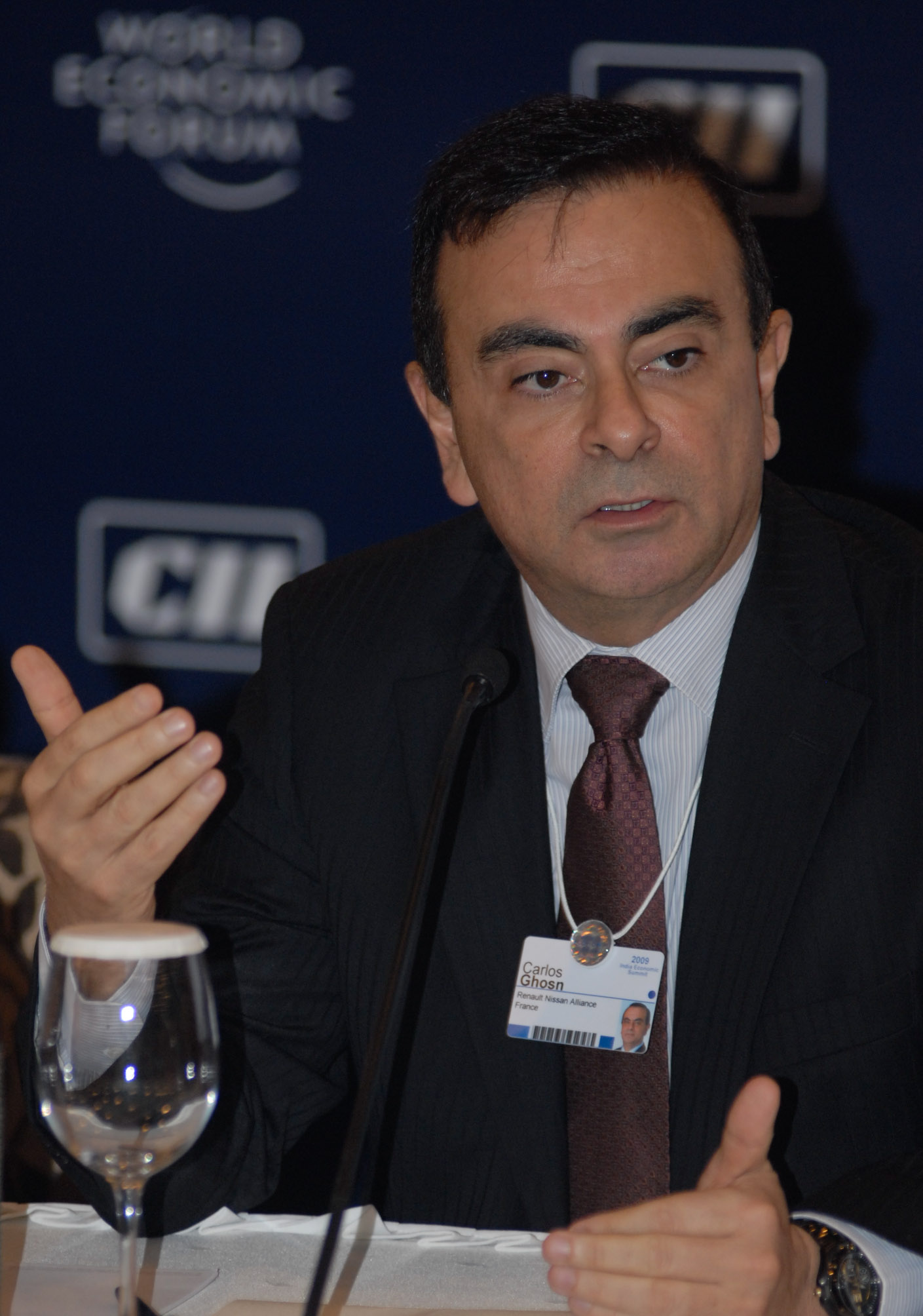
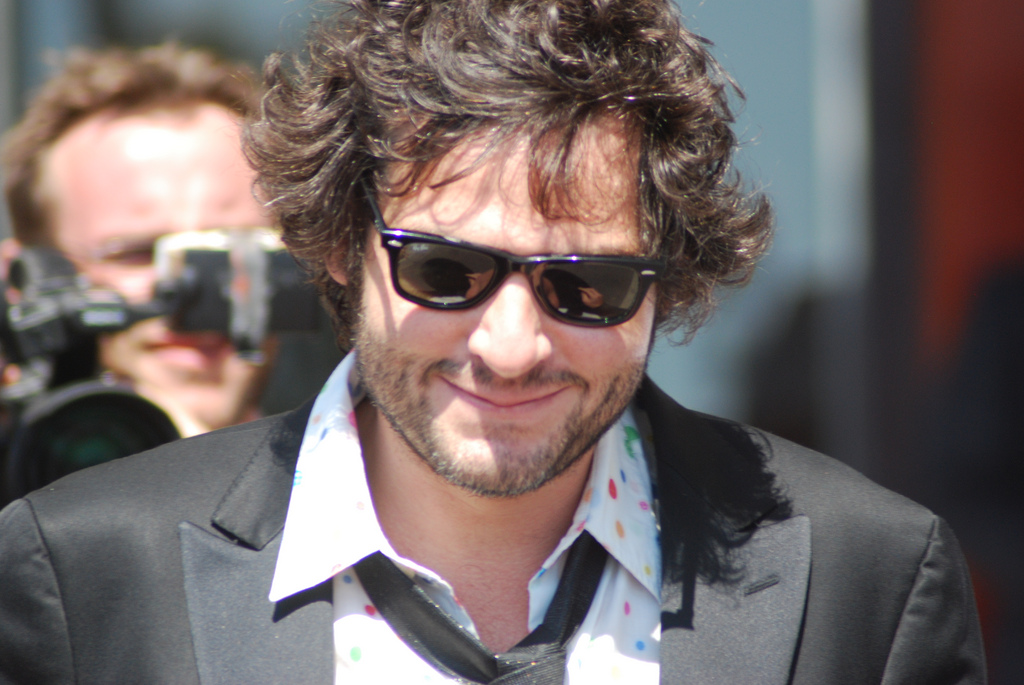
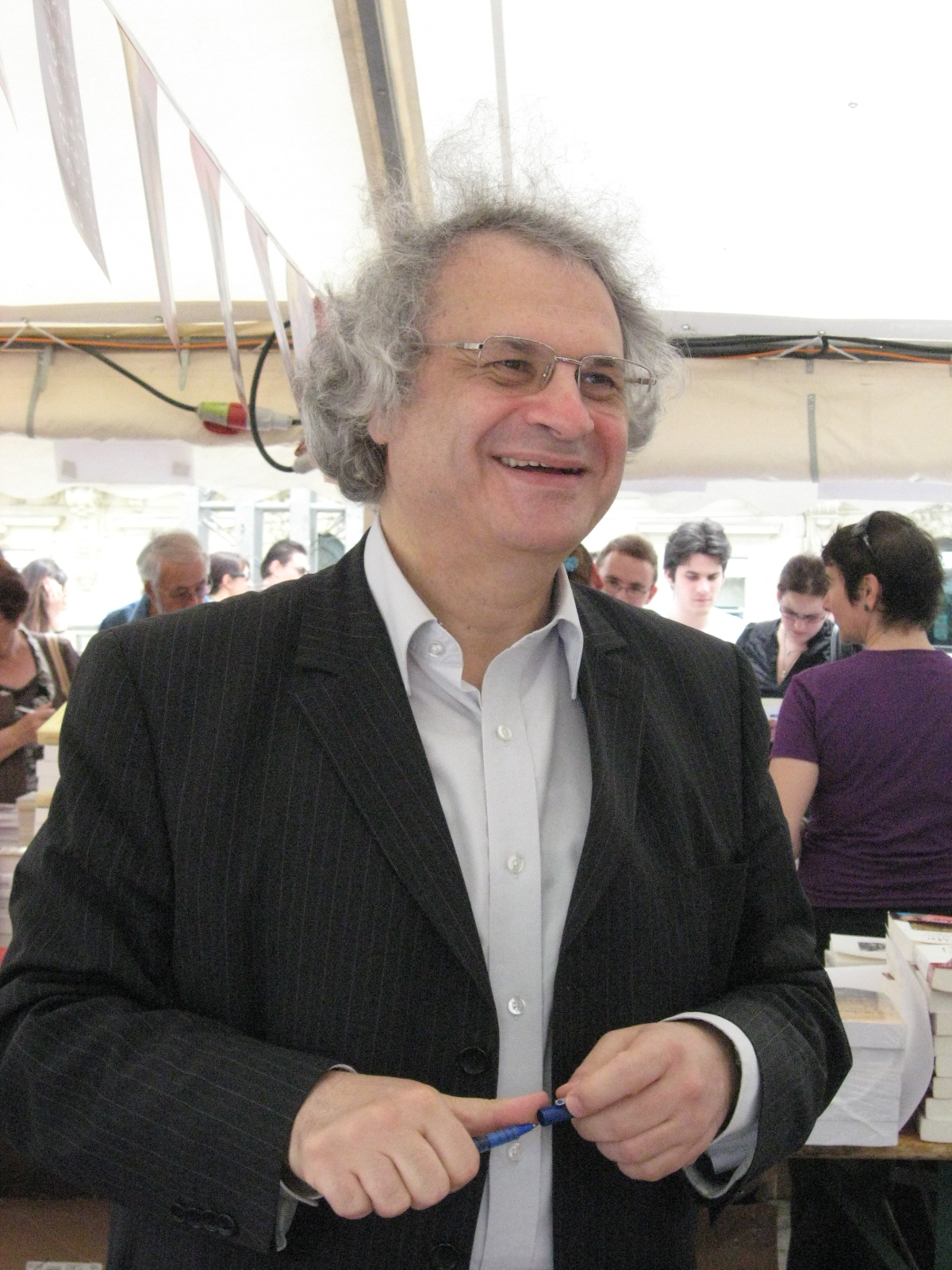
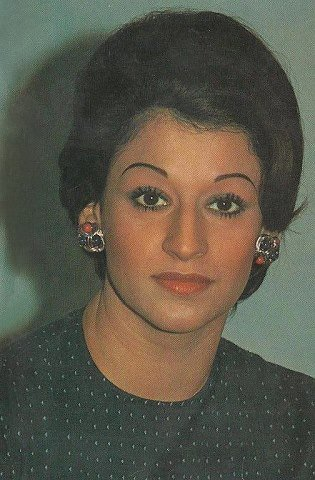
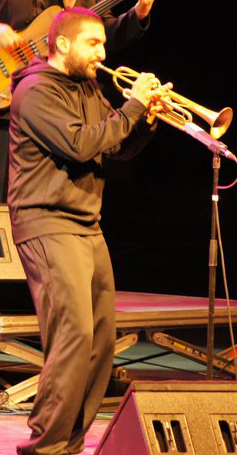
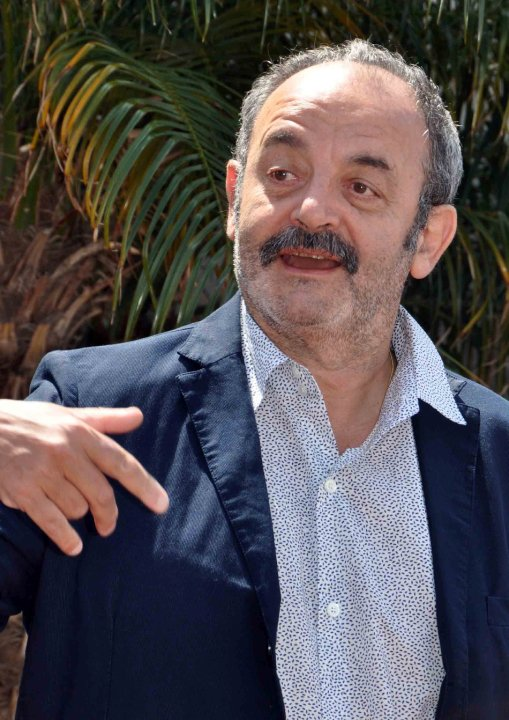
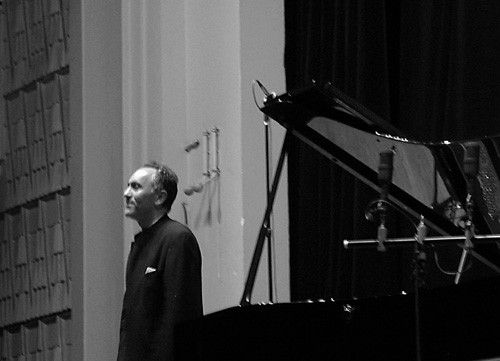
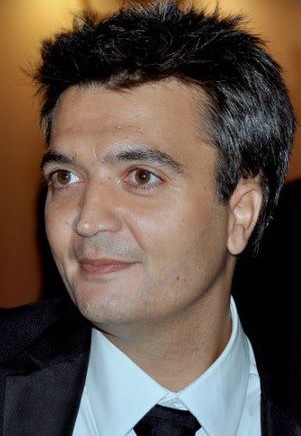
Éric Besson	Élie Aboud	Antoine Sfeir	Guy Béart	Carlos Ghosn	Matthieu Chedid
Amin Maalouf	Warda Al-Jazairia	Ibrahim Maalouf	Louis Chedid	Abdel Rahman El Bacha	Thomas Langmann

== See also ==
- Arabs in France
- Arabs in Europe
- Arab diaspora
- Asian diasporas in France
- France–Lebanon relations
- French people in Lebanon
- French language in Lebanon
