= Paul-Henri Cugnenc =

French surgeon and politician

Paul-Henri Cugnenc (1 June 1946, Thézan-lès-Béziers – 4 July 2007) was a French surgeon and deputy for Hérault's 6th constituency, representing the UMP, to the 12th and 13th legislatures of the National Assembly.
