= Georges Fontès =

French politician (1924–2020)

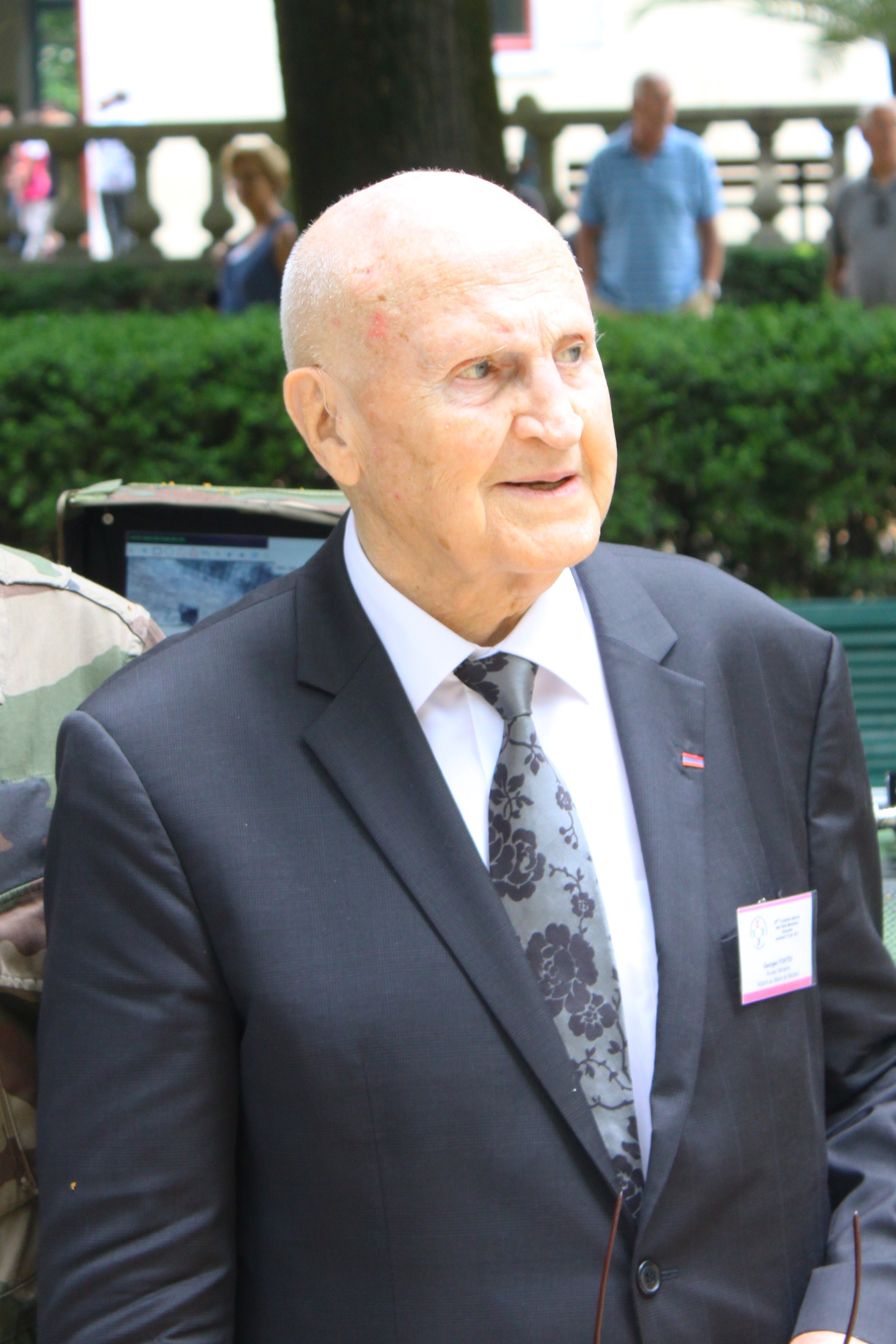
- Fontès in 2011

General Councillor of Hérault
- In office 26 March 1982 – 2 April 2015
- Preceded by: Pierre Brousse

Mayor of Béziers
- In office 18 March 1983 – 24 March 1989
- Preceded by: Paul Balmigère
- Succeeded by: Alain Barrau

Deputy of Hérault
- In office 16 March 1986 – 1 April 1986
- Succeeded by: René Couveinhes

State Secretary of Veterans' Affairs
- In office 20 March 1986 – 10 May 1988
- Preceded by: Jean Laurain
- Succeeded by: Jacques Mellick

Personal details
- Born: 5 September 1924 Béziers, France
- Died: 3 March 2020 (aged 95) Béziers, France
- Party: UMP
- Occupation: Politician

Georges Fontès (5 September 1924 – 3 March 2020) was a French politician. He was first a member of the Social Democratic Party (PSD), then the Rally for the Republic (RPR), and finally the Union for a Popular Movement (UMP).

== Biography ==
Fontès was the son of a truck driver and a housekeeper. He was excluded from the Grand Orient de France for "inassuidity". He was in favor of reestablishing the death penalty in France.

== Honors ==
- Officer of the Legion of Honour (2011)
- Knight of the Ordre national du Mérite
