= Raymond Couderc =

French politician

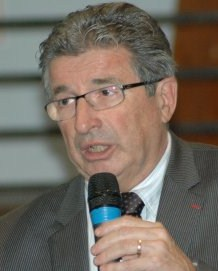
- Raymond Couderc

Senator, French Senate2007/2014
- Constituency: Hérault

Mayor of Béziers 1995/2014

President, Agglomeration community of Beziérs to the Mediterranean 2001/2014

Personal details
- Born: 16 September 1946 (age 79) Bordeaux, France
- Party: UMPtill 2016
- Occupation: professor emeritus
- Website: Official site

Raymond Couderc (born 16 September 1946 in Bordeaux) was a French politician, and a former member of the Senate of France, who represented the Department of Hérault. He was a member of the Union for a Popular Movement, which is a part of the European People's Party.

He was the Mayor of Béziers and the President of the community of the agglomeration Béziers to the Mediterranean. Before he was a senator, he was a député1993/97 in the National Assembly, representing the 6th constituency of Hérault.

Later he was a member (2020/2023) of the board and président of ethics committee of the NGO «ACTION CONTRE LA FAIM ».

== Conviction ==
The administrative Court of appeal in Marseille condemned the city of Béziers for workplace harassment leading to 'altruistic suicide' in 2003 Jean-Michel Rieux, his wife and his two children. Raymond Couderc was Mayor of the city of Béziers in 2003. The new municipality has not appealed to the Conseil d'État.
