= La Fouine discography =

Hip-hop recording artist discography

- Studio albums: 12
- Mixtapes: 6
- Extended Plays: 7

The discography of French rapper and singer La Fouine consists of twelve studio albums, six mixtapes and seven extended plays (EPs). La Fouine (born Laouni Mouhid, in 25 December 1981) is a rapper and record label founder. He rose to fame with his debut mixtape Planète Trappes (2004) and debut album Bourré au Son (2005), later receiving double gold for Aller-Retour (2007) and platinum certifications for Mes Repères (2009) and La Fouine vs Laouni (2011). La Fouine was voted Best French Artist at the 2011 MTV Europe Music Awards. In total, he has sold more than one million album units. His releases have included collaborations with other French and international artists, as well as projects issued through his own record label, Banlieue Sale.

== Albums and mixtapes ==
(A) denotes album, (M) denotes mixtape

Date	Album (A) / Mixtape (M)		Label	Charts				Certification
Date	Album (A) / Mixtape (M)		Label	FRA	BEL (Fl)	BEL (Wa)	SWI	Certification
26 October 2004	Planète Trappes	(M)	Jive-Epic	—	—	—	—	—
April 2005	Bourré au son	(A)	Jive-Epic	82	—	—	—	—
2 March 2006	Planète Trappes Volume 2	(M)	Jive-Epic	—	—	—	—	
12 March 2007	Aller-Retour	(A)	Jive-Epic	21	—	70	—	Gold
18 February 2008	Capitale du Crime	(M)	Banlieue Sale Music	78	—	—	—	—
13 February 2009	Mes Repères	(A)	Jive-Epic	2	—	13	70	Platinum
18 January 2010	Capitale du Crime Volume 2	(M)	Banlieue Sale Music	3	—	20	94	Gold
14 February 2011	La Fouine vs Laouni	(A)	Jive-Epic	1	—	5	30	Double Platinum
28 November 2011	Capitale du Crime Volume 3	(M)	Banlieue Sale Music	1	—	24	55	Gold
4 February 2013	Drôle de parcours	(A)	Jive-Epic	1	113	2	6	Platinum
28 November 2014	Capitale du Crime Volume 4	(M)	Banlieue Sale Music	15	—	50	—	
11 March 2016	Nouveau monde	(A)	Jive-Epic	8	—	11	37	
2 June 2017	CDCC	(A)	Jive-Epic	15	—	31	99	
12 October 2018	Sombre	(A)	Jive-Epic	29	—	58	—	
24 January 2020	Bénédictions	(A)	RCA-Sony	4	—	18	96	
21 May 2021	XXI	(A)	Banlieue Sale	27	—	72	—	
29 November 2024	Capitale du crime radio	(A)	Believe	7	—	15	19	
11 April 2025	État des lieux	(A)	Banlieue Sale	—	—	16	22	

== EP ==
- Gloire et Misère 1 (1999)
- Gloire et Misère 2 (1999)
- Tous Les Mêmes Choses (2000)
- Gloire et Misère 3 (2001)
- J'avance (2001)
- Boum Boum Boum (with Mala, 2004)

== Singles ==
Year	Album	Charts				Album
Year	Album	FRA	BEL (Wa) Ultratop	BEL (Wa) Ultratip	SWI	Album
2004	"Manque d'argent"	68	—	—	—	
2005	"L'unité " (featuring J-Mi Sissoko)	37	—	—	—	Bourré au son
2007	"Qui peut me stopper?"	20	—	—	—	Aller-Retour
2007	"Tombé pour elle" (featuring Amel Bent)	15	—	—	—	Aller-Retour
2009	"Du ferme"	—	—	8	—	Mes repères
2010	"Banlieue Sale Music" (featuring Nessbeal)	—	—	15	—	Capitale du crime Vol.2
2011	"Veni, vidi, vici"	24	—	28	—	La Fouine vs. Laouni
2011	"Papa"	17	—	14	—	La Fouine vs. Laouni
2011	"D'où l'on vient"	53	—	—	—	La Fouine vs. Laouni
2011	"Toute la night"	47	—	43	—	La Fouine vs. Laouni
2011	"Vécu" (featuring Kamelancien)	51	—	—	—	Capitale du Crime Vol. 3
2011	"Original"	81	—	—	—	Capitale du Crime Vol. 3
2012	"J'avais pas les mots"	16	39	—	—	Drôle de parcours
2013	"Paname Boss" (featuring Sniper, Niro, Youssoupha, Canardo, Fababy, Sultan)	54	42	—	—	Drôle de parcours
2013	"Ma meilleure" (featuring Zaho)	23	—	9	—	Drôle de parcours
2013	"Fête des mères"	45	—	—	—	
2014	"Va bene" (feat. Reda Taliani)	3	—	—	—	Capitale du Crime Volume 4
2015	"Ça va toujours"	49	—	—	—	
2015	"Par intérêt"	115	—	—	—	
2016	"Terminus"	156	—	—	—	Nouveau monde
2017	"Chargee"	129	—	—	—	CDCC
2017	"Litron"	—	—	—	—	CDCC
2017	"Donne-moi mes sous"	—	—	—	—	CDCC
2019	"Colorés"	117	—	—	—	Bénédictions
2025	"État des lieux (part 1)" (with Ninho)	—	31	—	—	État des lieux

=== Promotional ===
Year	Album	Charts	Album
Year	Album	FRA	Album
2013	"Redbull & vodka"	84	Drôle de parcours
2013	"Quand je partirai"	86	Drôle de parcours
2013	"A l'époque"	93	Drôle de parcours
2013	"Il se passe quelque chose"	101	Drôle de parcours
2013	"Karl"	158	Drôle de parcours
2013	"Donne-moi"	165	Drôle de parcours
2013	"On s'en bat les couilles 2013" (featuring Mac Tyer)	183	Drôle de parcours
2013	"Fatima"	186	Drôle de parcours
2014	"Conseil d'ami"	146	
2014	"Peace sur le FN"	163	
2014	"Lové"	175	

=== Featured in ===
Year	Album	Charts			Album
Year	Album	FRA	BEL (Wa) Ultratop	BEL (Wa) Ultratip	Album
2011	"Des pères, des hommes et des frères" (Corneille featuring La Fouine)	25	—	2	
2012	"Rollin' Like a Boss" (Mackenson featuring La Fouine & T-Pain)	141	—	—	
2012	"C'est la hass" (Zifou featuring La Fouine)	66	—	—	
2013	"Wesh ma gueule" (Fababy feat. La Fouine)	143	—	—	
2013	"Team BS" (La Fouine, Fababy, Sindy and Sultan)	21	—	—	

=== Singles per album ===
Year	Single	Album
2005	1st single : Quelque Chose De Spécial (feat Ellijah); 2nd single : L'unité (feat J-Mi Sissoko)	Bourré Au Son
2007	1st single : Qui Peut Me Stopper ?; 2nd single : Reste En Chien (feat Booba); 3rd single : Tomber Pour Elle (feat Amel Bent)	Aller-Retour
2008	1st single : Cherche La Monnaie; 2nd single : Capitale Du Crime (feat Canardo); 3rd single : Dignity (feat Matchstik)	Capitale du Crime
2009	1st single : Ca fait mal Remix (feat Soprano et Sefyu); 2nd single : Tous Les Mêmes; 3rd single : Du Ferme; 4th single : Hamdoulah Moi, Ça Va (feat Canardo); 5th single : Chips	Mes Repères
2010	1st single : Krav Maga; 2nd single : Banlieue sale Music (feat Nessbeal); 3rd single : Nés pour briller (feat Canardo, Green Money et MLC); 4th single : Iblis (Canardo)	Capitale du Crime Volume 2
2011	1st single : Passe leur le salam (feat Rohff); 2nd single : Caillra for life (feat The Game); 3rd single : Veni, vidi, vici; 4th single : Papa; 5th single : Nhar Sheitan Click; 6th single : D'où l'on vient; 7th single : Toute la night	La Fouine vs Laouni
2011	1st single : VNTM.com; 2nd single : Vecu (feat Kamelanc'); 3rd single : j'arrive en balle (feat Fababy); 4th single : C'est bien de (feat Fababy); 5th single : Ben Laden; 6th single : Rollin' like a boss (feat Mackenson et T-Pain); 7th single : Jalousie (feat Six Coups MC, Fababy et Leck ); 8th single : Capitale du crime 3 (feat 3010 et Sneazzy West)	Capitale du Crime Volume 3
2012	1st single : Paname Boss feat Sniper, Niro, Youssoupha, Canardo, Fababy et Sultan; 2nd single : J'avais pas les mots; 3rd single : À l'époque; 4th single : Il Se Passe Quelque Chose feat Youssoupha; 5th single : Ma Meilleure feat Zaho	Drôle de parcours

=== Other singles ===
- Manque d'argent (2004)
- 3 gars au ghetto (2004)
- Mon Autobiographie (2004)
- Quelque chose de Spécial (2004)
- L'unité Feat Jmi Sissoko (2004)
- Peu à l'arrivée (2004)
- Reste en chien Feat Booba (2007)
- Qui peut me stopper ? (2007)
- Banlieue sale (2007)
- On s'en bat les couilles (2007)
- Tombé pour elle (featuring Amel Bent) (2007)
- Drôle de parcours (2007)
- Cherche la monnaie (2008)
- Ca fait mal (featuring Soprano et Sefyu; remix by DJ Battle) (2008)
- Tous les mêmes (2009)
- Du Ferme (2009)
- Hamdoulah moi ça va (featuring Canardo) (2009)
- Chips (2009)
- Krav Maga (2009)
- Banlieue sale music (featuring Nessbeal) (2009)
- La3bine (featuring Don Bigg) (2009)
- Nés Pour briller (featuringCanardo, Green, MLC) (2010)
- Pleure pas (featuring Green, Canardo et Kennedy (2010)
- Viser La Victoire (Feat Admiral T & Medine (2010)
- Passe leur le Salam (featuring Rohff (15 November 2010)
- Veni Vidi Vici (2010)
- Caillra For Life (2010) (featuring Game) (15 December 2010)
- Papa (23 December 2010)
- Les Soleils de minuit (2011)
- Toute la night (2011)
- Vntm.com (2011) (featuring DJ Khaled)
- Vécu (2011) (featuring Kamelancien)
- Des Pères, des Hommes et des Frères (2011) (Corneille featuring La Fouine)

== Appearances ==
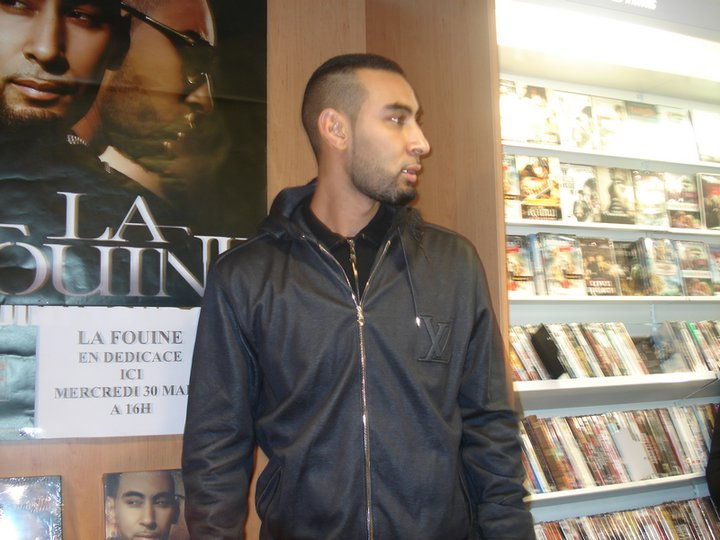
La Fouine in Besançon in 2011

2000 :

- La Fouine : Ma Génération extract from Rap.com

2001 :

- La Fouine featuring MC Circulaire: Façon Fouiskin

2002 :

- La Fouine : Freestyle extract from Violences Urbaines of LIM)
- Alibi Montana feat La Fouine : C'est Pour Les Mecs D'en Bas extract from Mandat de dêpot of Alibi Montana

2003 :

- La Fouine : Staarflah la famille extract from Talents fâchés
- La Fouine : Mon autobiographie extract fromMa Zone of Mala
- La Fouine : 3 gars au ghetto 'extract from 109 Rap & R&B
- La Fouine : Manque d'argent extract from 109 Rap & R&B
- La Fouine : G des tassesextract from 109 Rap & R&B

2004 :

- La Fouine featuring Shyd-D : For my J's extract from 92100% Hip Hop Vol.4
- La Fouine & Mala : Boum Boum Boum (EP)

2005 :

- La Fouine : C'est pour les mecs d'en bas extract fromWest Rider 2
- Willy Denzey feat la Fouine : Life extract from#1 of Willy Denzey
- La Fouine featuring Pat Seb – Let's shake the towels

2006 :

- La Fouine : Il en faut extract from Talents Fâchés 3
- La Fouine featuring Jazz Malone : Non-Stop extract from Paname All Stars
- La Fouine : Les barreaux extract from Phonographe
- Chabodo feat La Fouine & Jazz Malone : Levez haut les drapeaux extract from La Délinquance of Chabodo
- La Fouine featuring 2g68 : Koma Etilik
- La Fouine Feat S.Kro & Mc Gam'1 : Luxembourg City

2007 :

- Bibo feat La Fouine : Vie and Drop La Fouine extract from Volume Rose
- Manu Key featuring La Fouine : Responsable extract from Prolifique Vol.2
- Al Peco featuring La Fouine – Apparitions
- Phil G Unit featuring La Fouine : Talents Gâchés
- La Toxine featuring La Fouine : J'ai de l'amour pour mes caillesextract from Hi-One 1er Opus
- Matchstik featuring La Fouine : Dignity extract from Shock Therapy of Matchstick and "Capitale du Crime" of La Fouine
- La Fouine featuring Comma Comma : Luxembourg Freestyle Shop (Promo)
- La Fouine featuring Booba : Reste en chien extract from Aller-Retour
- La Fouine : Hold Up
- La Fouine: Etat des Lieux

2008 :

- La Fouine : J'repense aux frères extract from Big Ballers vol.2
- Grodash featuring La Fouine : Tenter sa chance extract from La Vie de rêve de Grodash
- Enhancer feat La Fouine : Rock Game extract from Désobéir de Enhancer
- La Fouine featuring Pat Seb : If you could shut the *** up (Extended)¨$L
- La Fouine featuring Phil G : Respect aux mothers
- La Fouine featuring Willy Denzey: Très agile, elle niche dans les greniers ou les dépendances
- La Fouine featuring Slim'H : Les portos ils vont prendre cher
- James Izmad featuring La Fouine : Oh No(Remix) extract from La FNAC en mode Rap Français
- Amine & La Fouine: La Génie

2009 :

- La Fouine featuring Soprano & Sefyu : Ca fait mal (Remix) extract from Mes Repères
- La Fouine featuring Scalo : Puisqu'on sait extract from Art' East (Best Of Label Rouge 3)
- DJ Battle feat La Fouine & Francisco : Du ferme (Remix) extract from Speciale Dedicace Au Rap Francais Vol. 3 :La Fouine Edition
- La Fouine feat Game : My Life (Remix) extract from Lil Wayne for President of DJ Battle
- La Fouine : Krav Maga extract from Capitale Du Crime Vol.2
- La Fouine feat Nessbeal : Banlieue sale music extract from Capitale du Crime Vol. 2
- La Fouine feat Canardo, Gued'1, Green, MLC : Krav Maga (Remix) (hosted by DJ Battle) extract from Capitale du Crime Vol. 2
- La Fouine featuring Accord'Eon : FT en galère, Let's Jump Baby !
- Don Bigg feat La Fouine : La3bine extrait de Byad ou K7al
- Timati feat La Fouine & J-Mi Sissoko : Briquets extract from The Boss de Timati
- La Fouine feat Reviens du balcon : J'crois que je ne vais pas manger ce soir
- La Fouine : Reste Tranquille
- Beuz feat La Fouine et Futur Proche : Matiére grise extract from Seulement une plume peut me donner des ailes
- La Fouine : Rien à perdre

2010 :

- Admiral T feat La Fouine & Médine : Viser la victoire extract from Intinct Admiral of Admiral T
- La Fouine feat Black Kent : Blackberry extract from Capitale du Crime Vol. 2
- La Fouine feat Green : Le Mauvais œil extract from Capitale du Crime Vol. 2
- La Fouine feat Rickwell : Youporn extract from Capitale du Crime Vol. 2
- La Fouine feat Green, Canardo et Kennedy : Pleure pas
- La Fouine feat Canardo, Green et Mlc : Nés pour briller extract from Capitale du Crime Vol. 2
- La Fouine feat DJ Battle : Quand la musique est bonne extract from Capitale du Crime Vol. 2
- Canardo feat La Fouine : Henijay extract from Papillon of Canardo
- La Fouine Feat Alonzo & Teddy Corona : Dans Nos Quartiers extract from Street Lourd Vol. 2
- Sofiane feat La Fouine : Blankok City Gang extract from Brakage Vocal Vol. 1
- Nessbeal feat La Fouine : Au Bout de la Route extract from NE2S of Nessbeal
- Rohff feat La Fouine : On peut pas tout avoir extract fromLa Cuenta of Rohff

2011 :

- La Fouine Feat M.A.S : Rappelle Toi extract from Une Minute De Silence of M.A.S
- Still Fresh feat La Fouine : C'est pas la même extract from Mes Rêves of Still Fresh
- 3010 feat Still Fresh & La Fouine: C'est pas la même (Remix)
- Médine feat La Fouine et V.A : Téléphone Arabe extract from Table d'écoute 2 de Médine
- La Fouine featuring DJ Khaled : Vntm.com extract from Capitale du Crime Vol. 3
- La Fouine featuring Kamelancien : Vécu extract from Capitale du Crime Vol. 3
- Corneille featuring La Fouine : Des Pères, des Hommes et des Frères extract from Les Inséparables of Corneille
- La Fouine : C'est de l'or
- Nessbeal feat Mister You et La Fouine : Là où les vents nous ménent extract from Sélection naturelle of Nessbeal
- La Fouine : On contrôle le monde
- La Fouine : Chewing gum
- La Fouine : Tu n'as aucun Swagg
- La Fouine : Nos Erreurs (resumption of A nos actes manqués de Jean-Jacques Goldman)

2012 :

- Fababy feat La Fouine : Problème extract from La Symphonie Des Chargeurs of Fababy
- La Fouine : Mimi Cracra
- La Fouine : Jacques Chirac
- Fababy feat La Fouine : Mère Seule extract from La Symphonie Des Chargeurs of Fababy
- La Fouine feat Le Rat Luciano : Esperer extract from Projet Nord Sud of 13eme Art Music
- Zifou feat La Fouine : C'est la Hass extract from Zifou 2 Dingue of Zifou
- Canardo feat La Fouine : Tous ce que j'aurais voulu faire extract from A la Youv of Canardo
- Kennedy feat La Fouine : On s'arrange extract from Sur Ecoute of Kennedy
- M.A.S feat La Fouine : Mauvais Rêves extract from Minute de Silence of M.A.S
- La Fouine : Si Maman Si (resumption of Si Maman Si de France Gall)
- Canardo feat La Fouine et Seth Gueko : Mele Me (remix) extract from A la Youv of Canardo
- M.A.S feat La Fouine : Sur un banc extract from Minute de Silence of M.A.S
- DJ Battle feat La Fouine : Trappes Stars
- Patrick Bruel feat La Fouine : Mots D'enfants extract from "Lequel De Nous" of Patrick Bruel
- Sultan feat La Fouine : Des Jours Meilleurs extract from Des Jours Meilleurs of Sultan
- S-Pi feat La Fouine, Youssoupha, Grodash, Tito Prince, Kozi & Poison : Kinshasa Boss
- La Fouine feat Admiral T, Kalash, XMAN, Young Chang Mc & Lieutenant : West Indies (Remix)

2013 :

- Kamelanc' feat La Fouine : Pour En Arriver Là extract from Coupé Du Monde of Kamelanc'
- La Fouine feat Tar-K Sheitanik : Waheed (On les baise)
- Fababy feat La Fouine : Wesh Ma Gueule extract from La Force du Nombre of Fababy
- La Fouine feat Bad News Brown : Reign (Remix)
- La Fouine feat Farid Bang – Morocco Gang

== Videography ==
=== Music videos ===
Year	Single	Director
2004	Autobiographie	OCM
2005	L'unité (feat J-Mi Sissoko)	OCM
2005	Quelque chose de spécial (feat Ellijah)	OCM
2006	On s'en bat les Couilless	OCM
2007	Qui peut me stopper ?	OCM
2007	Reste en chien (feat Booba)	OCM
2007	Banlieue Sale (feat Gued'1 et Kennedy)	OCM
2007	Dignity (feat Matchstick)	Da Connect
2007	Tombé Pour Elle (feat Amel Bent)	OCM
2008	Cherche la Monnaie	Chris Macari
2008	Ça Fait Mal (Remix) (feat Soprano et Sefyu)	Mazava Prod
2009	Tous les mêmes	Mazava Prod
2009	Du ferme	Mazava Prod
2009	Hamdoullah moi ça va (feat Canardo)	Mazava Prod
2009	Krav Maga	Chris Macari
2009	Banlieue Sale Music (feat Nessbeal)	Chris Macari
2009	Krav Maga (Remix) (feat Gued'1, Green Money, Canardo et MLC)	Chris Macari
2010	Nés pour briller (feat Canardo, Green Money et MLC)	Charly Clodion
2010	Mauvais œil (feat Green Money)	Iceland Film
2010	Passe leur le salam (feat Rohff)	Wahib Cheheta
2010	Caillra for life (feat The Game)	Mazava Prod
2011	Veni Vidi Vici	Mazava Prod
2011	Les soleils de minuit	Glenn Smith
2011	Papa	Mazava Prod
2011	Mathusalem	Glenn Smith
2011	Fouiny Gamos	Glenn Smith
2011	Interlude-One shot	1986 Prod
2011	Caillra for life 2 (feat Game)	The Walkers Ent
2011	Elle venait du ciel (feat Zaho)	Mangua.D
2011	Bafana Bafana remix (feat Soprano, Admiral T, Seth Gueko, Canardo, Nessbeal, Dj Battle et Cut Killer)	Glenn Smith
2011	nhar sheitan Click	1986 Prod
2011	D'où l'on vient	Mazava Prod
2011	Toute la night	1986 Prod
2011	VNTM.COM (feat Dj Khaled)	1986 Prod
2011	Vécu (feat Kamelancien)	1986 Prod
2011	J'arrive en balle (feat Fababy)	1986 Prod
2011	Ben Laden	1986 Prod
2011	C'est bien de… (feat Fababy)	1986 Prod
2011	Rollin Like A Boss… (feat Mackenson & T-Pain)	1986 Prod
2011	Rappelle-toi(feat MAS)	Guillaume Viscogliosi
2011	Jalousie (feat SixcoupsMC, Leck & Fababy)	1986 Prod
2012	Capitale du crime 3 (feat Sneazzy et 3010)	1986 Prod
2012	Paname Boss (feat Sniper, Niro, Youssoupha, Canardo, Fababy & Sultan)	1986 Prod
2012	J'avais pas les mots	-
2013	Autopsie 5	
2013	Il se passe quelque chose (feat Youssoupha)	1986 Prod
2013	Ma Meilleure (feat Zaho)	-
2013	Quand je partirai	
2014	Va bene (with Reda Taliani)	Glenn Smith
2015	Insta (feat. Lartiste)	
2018	Mohamad Salah	TBA

=== Music videos other projects ===
Year	Single	Director
2004	Banlieue ouest (with Vf Gang)	Souljah / OCM
2006	État des lieux	Canal+
2007	Responsable (with Manu Key)	Chris Macari
2008	Dignity (with Matchscick)	Da Connect
2010	Viser la victoire (with Medine et Admiral-T)	Chris Macari
2011	Des pères, des hommes et des frères (with Corneille)	Jean Marie Antonini
2011	C'est La Hass (with Zifou)	1986 Prod
2012	Problème (with Fababy)	1986 Prod

=== Appearances in music videos ===
- 2008: "Macadam" of Youssoupha
- 2009: "Je danse" of Jenifer
- 2009: "La mélodie du Ghetto" of Black Kent
- 2009: "Tonight" of Green Money
- 2009: "Une journée comme tant d'autres" of Morad
- 2010: "Greenologie 2016" of Green Money
- 2010: "On nous demande" of Predatene
- 2010: "Sortez les billets" of Chabodo
- 2010: "Ca bouge pas" of Nessbeal
- 2011: "Skyzofrench rap 2" of Eklips
- 2011: "La Symphonie des Chargeurs" of Fababy
- 2011: "Avec la haine" of Fababy
- 2011: "Mal à dire" of Fababy
- 2012: "Pilote" of M.A.S.
- 2012: "Un arabe à Miami" of Lacrim
