= Drôle de parcours =

Studio album by La Fouine
- Released: 4 February 2013
- Genre: French hip hop
- Length: 64:16
- Language: French
- Labels: Banlieue Sale, Jive, Sony Music France
- Producers: Bone Collector, Crada, DikC, Meti Fantomm, E-Rise & Doc Ness, Gun Roulett, K-sba, Kore, Médeline, Oneshot, Prinzly, Rodney Jerkins, Seycko, Luca Presti, Sonny Alves

La Fouine chronology
Capitale du crime, Vol. 3 (2011)	Drôle de parcours (2013)	Team BS (2014)

Singles from Drôle de parcours
- 1. "J'avais pas les mots" Released: November 19, 2012

Drôle de parcours is the fifth studio album by French rapper La Fouine. It was released on 4 February 2013 by his record label Banlieue Sale and Jive Records, and peaked at number 1 on the French Albums Chart.

== Background ==
After the release of his fourth studio album La Fouine vs. Laouni on 14 February 2011, La Fouine released the mixtape Capitale du crime, Vol. 3 on 28 November the same year, that featured artists such as T-Pain, Orelsan, Mister You, Nessbeal, Alonzo or even Amel Bent and Corneille, who are both featured in Drôle de parcours. Corneille also released the single "Des pères, des hommes et des frères" with La Fouine the same year.

In March 2012, La Fouine announced that he was working on a fifth studio album, and was working with Amel Bent in the studio. In September 2012, he revealed February 2013 as the release month for the album, as well as its title.

== Singles ==
- "J'avais pas les mots" was released as the album's lead single on 19 November 2012. It peaked at number 16 on the French Singles Chart.

== Critical reception ==
Professional ratings
Review scores
Source	Rating
Music Story	3/5 stars

François Alvarez of Music Story called Drôle de parcours an album that is "torn between legitimacy and smiles on the radio, and that may ultimately leave everyone hungry". He emphasizes, "an even disc where the tracks close to variety especially have the quality of being easily programmable on radio". He specifies that La Fouine "doesn't hide himself and fully varies his rap, while slipping some harder tracks to show that his exile in Florida did not completely soften him."

=== Commercial performance ===
Drôle de parcours sold more than 100,000 copies and spent a total of 55 weeks in the French Albums Charts, and was later certified platinum in France.

== Track listing ==
No.	Title	Writer(s)	Producer(s)	Length
1.	"J'avais pas les mots"	Laouni Mouhid	Luca Presti	3:41
2.	"À bout de bras"	Mouhid	Médeline	3:51
3.	"Ma meilleure" (featuring Zaho)	Mouhid, Zehira Darabid, Rodney Jerkins, Julie Frost	Rodney Jerkins	5:05
4.	"À l'époque"	Mouhid	Sonny Alves	4:32
5.	"Redbull et vodka"	Mouhid, Djamel Fezari	Kore	3:10
6.	"Panam Boss" (featuring Sniper, Niro, Youssoupha, Canardo, Fababy, Tunisiano and Sultan)	Mouhid, Bachir Baccour, Ryad Selmi, Niro, Youssoupha Mabiki, Hakim Mouhid, Fabrice Ayékoué, Soultaouane Benjadid	Prinzly	6:51
7.	"Fatima" (Interlude)	Fatima Mouhid		0:27
8.	"Fatima"	Mouhid	K-sba	3:53
9.	"Banlieue Sale Mafia" (Interlude)	Mouhid	Prinzly	2:33
10.	"Donne-moi"	Mouhid, Christian Kalla, Son Ha	Crada	4:34
11.	"Essaie encore"	Mouhid	K-sba	4:00
12.	"Il se passe quelque chose" (featuring Youssoupha)	Mouhid, Youssoupha Mabiki	Gun Roulett, Sonny Alves	3:37
13.	"Quand je partirai"	Mouhid, Beverley Craven	K-sba	4:10
14.	"Karl" (featuring Amel Bent)	Mouhid, Amel Bachir	E-Rise & Doc Ness	4:20
15.	"Demain on verra" (featuring Corneille)	Mouhid, Cornélius Nyungura, Sofia de Medeiros	DJ No Name	3:17
16.	"J'espère"	Mouhid	DikC	6:15
Total length:				64:16

iTunes bonus tracks
No.	Title	Writer(s)	Producer(s)	Length
17.	"On s'en bat les couilles 2013" (featuring Mac Tyer)	Mouhid, Socrate Petteng	Bone Collector	4:59
18.	"Ray Charles" (featuring French Montana)	Mouhid, Karim Kharbouch	Oneshot	5:27

Bonus track
No.	Title	Writer(s)	Producer(s)	Length
19.	"7 ans déjà"	Mouhid	Seycko	3:53

Notes

- The name "Mouhid" refers to Laouni Mouhid. Fatima Mouhid and Hakim Mouhid are referred to by their full names.

== Personnel ==
Credits for Drôle de parcours adapted from Discogs.

- Luca Presti – Producer, keyboard, drum programming
- Bone Collector – Producer
- Christian "Crada" Kalla – Producer
- DikC – Producer, keyboard, drum programming
- DJ No Name – Producer, keyboard, drum programming
- E-Rise & Doc Ness – Producer
- Gun Roulett – Producer, keyboard, drum programming
- K-sba – Producer
- Kore – Producer
- La Fouine – Primary artist
- Médeline – Producer
- Oneshot – Producer, keyboard, drum programming
- Prinzly – Producer, keyboard, drum programming
- Rodney Jerkins – Producer
- Seycko – Producer
- Son Ha – Piano
- Sonny Alves – Producer, keyboard, drum programming

== Charts ==
=== Weekly charts ===
Chart (2013)	Peak position
Belgian Albums (Ultratop Flanders)	113
Belgian Albums (Ultratop Wallonia)	2
French Albums (SNEP)	1
Swiss Albums (Schweizer Hitparade)	6

=== Year-end charts ===
Chart (2013)	Position
Belgian Albums (Ultratop Wallonia)	84
French Albums (SNEP)	63
