= Tunisiano =

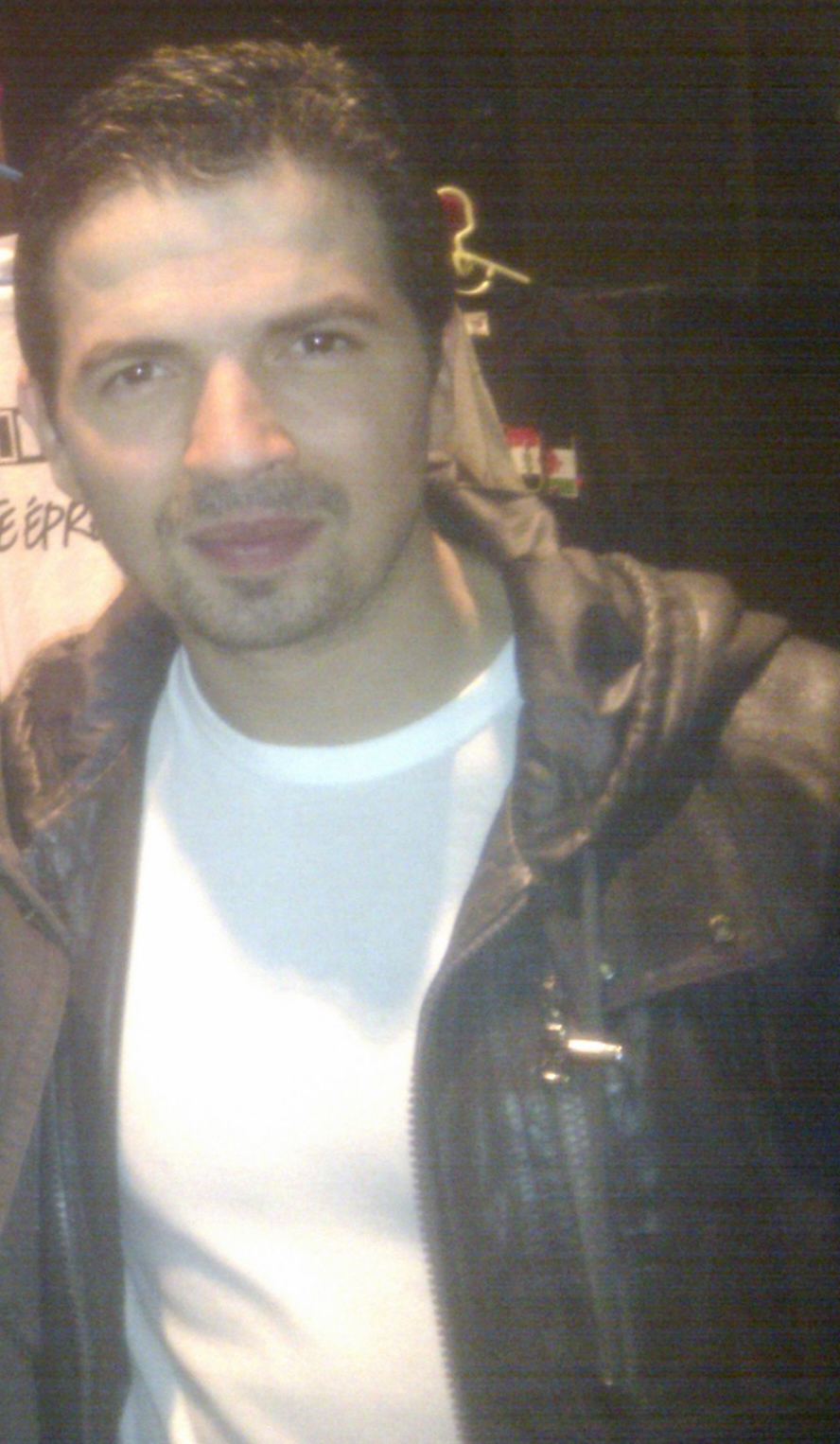

Background information
- Born: Bachir Baccour; 19 May 1979 (age 46)
- Origin: Deuil-la-Barre, Val-d'Oise, Île de France, France
- Genres: Hip hop
- Years active: 1995-present
- Website: myspace.com/tunisianofficial

Bachir Baccour (born 19 May 1979), better known by his stage name Tunisiano, is a Tunisian rapper living in France. Prior to pursuing a solo career, he was a member of M, Sniper and other rap groups.

== Career ==
Bachir Baccour's parents were born in Menzel Bouzelfa, Tunisia. Interested very early with hip hop music, he started writing lyrics at 13.

=== Beginnings ===
Member of M group

In 1995, he joined M Group. He was just 16. M Group released a number of maxis and a mini album.

Others

He was also part of the French rappers collective named Comité where he found Aketo, and met Scheol (later known as Blacko), and created the band Personnalité Suspecte. In 1997, he was also approached by the record label Desh Musique took part in a major event Hip Hop Folies at La Rochelle.

=== Member of Sniper ===
In 2000, he joined Sniper who released Du rire aux larmes. The band were involved in legal problems, and so were obliged to cancel the tour. In 2003, Sniper released their second album Gravé dans la roche again with Sniper. Blacko stopped rapping and moved to Ragga / Dancehall and there were rumors of a band split. However they managed to release a third album Trait pour trait in 2006.

Tunisiano also published La France, Itinéraire d'une polémique with journalist and writer Olivier Cachin, talking about conflicts with extreme right-wing groups.

In 2007, he also appeared in Aketo's album Cracheur 2 Venin.

=== Solo ===
Tunisiano, after publishing solo materials on various rap compilations (like Illégal Muzik) and music for the film Taxi 4, in 2008 he released his first complete solo album, Le regard des gens. The song Je porte plainte created conflict among allegations that he had taken it from the song Ever Dream (from Finnish band Nightwish) without taking their consent. Nuclear Blast Records open a lawsuit for plagiarism.

== Discography ==
=== M Group albums ===
- 1995 : Fidèle au rap
- 1997 : Tu disais quoi?
- 1998 : Rapide comme un serpent, 2ème Morsure
- 1999 : Graine de Star

=== Sniper albums ===
- 2001: Du rire aux larmes
- 2003: Gravé dans la Roche
- 2006: Trait pour trait
- 2009: C'est pas fini
- 2011: À toute épreuve
- 2018: Personnalité suspectes

=== Solo albums ===
Year	Album	Peak positions			Certification
Year	Album	BEL (Wa)	FR	SUI	Certification
2008	Le Regard des gens	24	11	35	
2014	Marqué à vie	21	18	62	

=== Singles ===
Year	Single	Peak positions	Album
Year	Single	FR	Album
2008	"Equivoque"	17	Le Regard des gens
2021	"Ballade à deux" (feat. Inès Reg)	167	Je te veux, moi non plus (soundtrack)

Other non charting singles

- 2008 : "Nos rues"
- 2008 : "Le regard des gens"
- 2008 : "Je porte plainte"
- 2009 : "Marlich"
- 2009 : "Citoyens du monde" (feat Zaho)

=== Featured in ===
Year	Single	Peak positions	Certification	Album
Year	Single	FR	Certification	Album
2008	"La roue tourne" (Zaho feat. Tunisiano)	15		
2011	"Ça sort du Zoogataga" (Mister You feat. Tunisiano & Isleym)	66		
2012	"Avec toi" (Axel Tony feat. Tunisiano)	7		

=== Collaborations ===
- 1999: Sniper - Association de scarla on Power of unity mixtape
- 1999: Sniper feat Prodige - Même pas 20 piges on Premiere Classe Vol. 1 mixtape
- 1999: Sniper - Exercice de style on B.O.S.S. mixtape
- 2000: K.Special feat Sniper - Les porcs on K.Special album Cause à effet
- 2001: Sniper feat Aben - Mission suicide on the compilation Mission suicide
- 2001: Sniper feat Tandem, Bakar and Aben - Niquer le système on the compilation Sachons dire NON Vol.2
- 2002: Sniper - Fierté d'honneur sur la mixtape Samouraï
- 2002: TNT feat Sniper - On dit quoi on the TNT album Felxible comme un roseau
- 2003: Sniper feat Kazkami and Dadoo - Victimes des circonstances on the Insurrection mixtape
- 2004: Sniper feat Bakar - On revient choquer la France on the On revient choquer la France mixtape
- 2004: Sniper - Live Radio on Session freestyle mixtape
- 2005: Tandem feat Tunisiano, Kazkami, Faf Larage, Lino, Diam's and Kery James - Le jugement on the Tandem album C'est toujours pour ceux qui savent
- 2005: Sniper - Encore on the Rap Performance mixtape
- 2005: El Tunisiano - Gravé dans l'instru on the Ma conscience mixtape
- 2005: Tunisiano feat Sinik, Kool Shen, Zoxea, Nysay and Iron Sy - Ma conscience on the Ma conscience mixtape
- 2005: Tunisiano - Zinc on the compilation Patrimoine du ghetto
- 2005: Bakar feat Sniper - On revient choquer la France on the Bakar street CD Pour les quartiers
- 2006: L'Skadrille feat Sniper - Bons moments on the L'Skadrille album Nos vies
- 2006: Sinik feat Tunisiano - Un monde meilleur on the Sinik album Sang froid
- 2006: Sniper feat Scred Connexion - Sirocco on the compilation Police
- 2006: Tunisiano - Mes mots on the compilation Illegal Radio
- 2006: Apash feat Tunisiano - Un bon son pour une bonne cause on Apash' street CD Un bon son pour une bonne cause
- 2007: Sniper - Quoi qu'il arrive and Rien à foutre both on the film album Taxi 4
- 2007: Sniper - Le goût du sang on the film album Scorpion
- 2007: Two Naze feat Sniper - L'angoisse d'une mère on the Two Naze album C'est de la balle
- 2007: Tunisiano feat Taro OG, La Meche, Mood and Alonso - Morts pour rien on the Morts pour rien mixtape
- 2007: Sniper feat Jérome Prister - Say you'll be Remix
- 2007: Six Coups Mc feat Sniper and Sefyu - Style certifié on the Six Coups Mc street CD A prendre ou à laisser
- 2008: Zaho feat Tunisiano - La roue tourne on Zaho album Dima
- 2008: Tunisiano - Arrête-moi si tu peux on the film album Mesrine
- 2008: Tunisiano feat Reda Taliani - Ça passe ou ça casse on the compilation Rai'N'B fever Vol.3
- 2009: Kamelancien feat Mac Kregor, Ol Kainry, Tunisiano and Jango Jack - T'était Ou? Remix on Kamelancien album 2eme frisson de la vérité
- 2009: Tunisiano - Est-ce que j'ai la côte on the compilation Les yeux dans la banlieue Vol.2
- 2009: Tunisiano feat AKA - Maillot jaune on the compilation Punchline Street beat show
- 2009: Tunisiano feat Aketo and TLF - In compilation Talents fâchés 4
- 2009: Tunisiano feat Cheb Bilal - 1001 problèmes on the compilation Maghreb United
- 2009: Tunisiano feat GSX - Ca va le faire
- 2010: Youssoupha feat Tunisiano, Ol' Kainry, Médine and Sinik - Apprentissage Remix
- 2010: Kalash l'Afro feat. Tunisiano - On fait la différence on the Kalash l'Afro mixtape Que du seum
- 2010: Six Coups MC feat. Tunisiano & TLF - Définition de ma dalle on the Six Coups MC album Un pied dans le bitume
- 2010: Aka feat. Tunisiano - Maillot jaune on the Aka album La maladie de la haine
- 2010: Mister You feat Tunisiano - Ca sort du Zoogataga on the Mister You album MDR : Mec De Rue
- 2010: Alkpote feat. Tunisiano - Mise à mort programmé
- 2011: Tunisiano feat M.A.S - Appelle moi on Tunisiano album Une Minute de Silence
- 2011: Sniper (Tunisiano and Aketo) and Reda Taliani - Arabia (after events in Tunisia)
- 2011: Sniper, Sinik, Rim'K, Médine, Mokless, Haroun, Leck, L'Algerino, Bakar, Mister You and Reda Taliani - Arabia Remix All Stars
- 2011: Sniper feat. Soprano - J'te parle
- 2011: Axel Tony feat. Tunisiano - Avec Toi
- 2012: Dernier Mc (Remix) - Kery James
- 2012: "Paname Boss" - La Fouine feat. Sniper, Niro, Youssoupha, Canardo, Fababy & Sultan - (in La Fouine album Drôle de parcours)
- 2013: Dernier MC Remix Partie 1 - Kery James feat. Lino, Tunisiano, REDK, Médine, 2^{e} France, Scylla, Ladea, Fababy & Orelsan
- 2013: "Coupable" - Scylla feat R.E.D.K. & Tunisiano - (in Scylla album Abysses
- 2014: "My Bled" - DJ Kayz feat. Tunisiano & Cheb Houssem (in DJ Kayz album Paris Oran NY)
- 2014: "Amane Amane" - L'Algérino feat. Tunisiano (in L'Algérino album Aigle Royal)
- 2021: "Ballade à deux" feat. Inès Reg - (in soundtrack of film Je te veux, moi non plus)

== Personal life ==
Tunisiano has been known in French kickboxing circuits, as well as overseas. Among everything, he has released a "C'est Qui? C'est Khider!" single for the multiple champion and future participant of "La Ferme Célébrités en Afrique", Farid Khider, as well as appeared as a cornerman for the latter when he contested for World Kickboxing Network European title in Minsk, Belarus in 2005.
