= Niro (rapper) =

French-Moroccan rapper (born 1987)

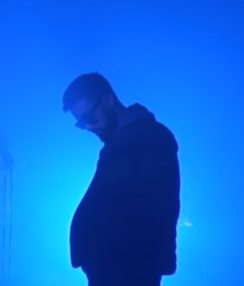

Background information
- Born: Nourredine Bahri; 9 July 1987 (age 38); Orléans, Centre, France
- Origin: Blois, France
- Genres: Hip hop
- Occupation: Rapper
- Instrument: Vocals
- Years active: 2009–present

Nourredine Bahri (Arabic: نور الدين البحري; born 9 July 1987), better known by his stage name Niro (French pronunciation: [niʁo]), is a French-Moroccan rapper from Blois. In 2013, he was signed to the AZ label after many years with the rap label Street Lourd formed by members of the French rap collective Mafia K'1 Fry.

== Career ==
He started earlier releasing his street album Niroshima III in 2007. Niro became the first independent act to be signed to Street Lourd. His first single "70 Kg" was released in 2011 followed by "Dans ton kwaah" and "Pikassos". He was featured on recordings by well-known rappers including Seth Gueko, Kery James and Booba. He is considered one of the prominent figures of French "street rap" (le rap de rue).

In 2012, he released his debut studio album Paraplégique that contained many of his earlier hits. Immediately after the release of the album, he was involved in legal problems on some minor charges, arrested after a police chase and sentenced to a five-month term.

While in jail, he composed his second album Rééducation that he released to critical acclaim in 2013 addressing his legal problems. In 2014, he returned with a third album Miraculé. He followed this with Si je me souviens in 2015 and Or Game in 2016.

== Discography ==
=== Albums ===
Year	Album	Peak positions				Certification
Year	Album	FRA	BEL (Fl)	BEL (Wa)	SWI	Certification
2012	Paraplégique	53	–	–	–	
2013	Rééducation	13	–	–	–	
2014	Miraculé	6	–	25	–	
2015	Si je me souviens	11	–	34	53	
2016	Or Game	17	–	20	52	
2016	Les autres	18	–	39	80	
2017	OX7	9	–	13	96	
2017	M8RE	6	–	9	–	
2018	Mens rea	4	–	11	79	
2019	Stupéfiant	22	–	–	–	
2020	Sale môme	4	154	4	20	
2023	Taulier	1	–	7	5	
2025	Hayati (Episode 1: Du sable et du sang)	–	–	16	22	

=== Street albums ===
- 2012 : Paraplégique (Street Lourd/Musicast)

=== Singles ===
==== As lead artist ====
Year	Single	Peak positions	Album
Year	Single	FR	Album
2015	"Good Kat"	67	
2015	"#BaWéMonAmi"	61	Si je me souviens
2016	"Mama t'avais raison"	53	Les autres
2017	"Sors de ma tête"	112	
2019	"En double appel"	50	
2019	"After" (feat. Alonzo)	106	
2023	"Qui Sait?"	28	

==== As featured artist ====
Year	Single	Peak positions		Album
Year	Single	FR	BEL (Wa)	Album
2013	"Paname Boss" (La Fouine feat. Sniper, Niro, Youssoupha, Canardo, Fababy, Sultan)	54	42	La Fouine album Drôle de parcours
2015	"Militarisé" (Gradur feat. Niro)	99	–	Gradur album L'homme au bob
2018	"La hagra" (YL feat. Sofiane & Niro)	45	–	YL album Confidences
2018	"Persona non grata" (Rohff feat. Niro)	65	–	Rohff album Surnaturel
2019	"On fait l'mal" (YL feat. Niro)	103	–	YL album Nyx & Érèbe
2019	"Ceci n'est pas du rap" (Maître Gims feat. Niro)	64	–	Non-album release
2021	"Travail d'arabe" (ZKR feat. Niro)	31	–	ZKR album Dans les mains

=== Other charted songs ===
Year	Song	Peak positions	Album
Year	Song	FR	Album
2013	"Les mains sales"	146	Rééducation
2014	"Vivastreet"	54	Miraculé
2014	"La mort ou tchitchi" (feat. Kaaris)	38	Miraculé
2014	"Perdu"	23	Miraculé
2015	"Le ciel est ma limite"	162	Si je me souviens
2016	"Marco Benz"	183	Les autres
2016	"Ara"	194	Les autres
2017	"Printemps blanc" (feat. Ivy)	109	Les autres
2017	"Sors de ma tête"	45	OX7
2017	"Ghettoyouth"	124	OX7
2017	"Oxymore"	127	OX7
2017	"Abbé Pierre"	130	OX7
2017	"Blasé"	137	OX7
2017	"Avant de partir"	145	OX7
2017	"Si ils savaient"	155	OX7
2017	"Sale morveux"	161	OX7
2017	"Ambition"	162	OX7
2017	"GTA"	183	OX7
2017	"On commence par où?"	111	M8re
2017	"Raisonner"	120	M8re
2017	"Photo de classe"	123	M8re
2017	"Héritiers"	134	M8re
2017	"On va la faire"	142	M8re
2017	"Magnum"	166	M8re
2018	"On est prêt"	88	Mens rea
2018	"On s'refait"	146	Mens rea
2018	"Loup alpha"	148	Mens rea
2018	"La folie"	151	Mens rea
2018	"Jamais"	166	Mens rea
2018	"Mens rea"	168	Mens rea
2019	"Kim Jong-il" (with Ninho)	24	Non-album release
2019	"Appuyer"	141	Non-album release
2019	"Mon temps"	88	Non-album release
2019	"Uber X"	104	Non-album release
2019	"Cantona"	117	Non-album release
2019	"Stupéfiant" (featuring Maes)	59	Stupéfiant
2019	"Yomb de toi"	138	Stupéfiant
2019	"Solvable, Partie 1" (featuring SCH)	68	Stupéfiant
2019	"Fort et vivant"	157	Stupéfiant
2019	"Mwana Mboka"	185	Stupéfiant
2020	"J'dois l'oublier"	97	Sale môme
2020	"Pay" (feat. Maître Gims)	124	Sale môme
2020	"Oeil de Juda"	126	Sale môme
2020	"Du temps et des lov"	128	Sale môme
2020	"Pardonnable"	133	Sale môme
2020	"Contre vents et marées"	139	Sale môme
2020	"Etoile filante"	157	Sale môme
2020	"En dessous" <smnall>(feat. Nino B)</small.	184	Sale môme
2021	"Amiga" (feat. Soolking)	137	Non-album release
2021	"Millenials (Génération Y)"	99	Non-album release
