= Shtar Academy (album) =

Studio album by Shtar Academy
- Released: 20 January 2014
- Recorded: 2012–2014; Studio Hip Hop Convict, Luynes, Bouches-du-Rhône
- Genre: French hip hop
- Length: 74:13
- Label: Fu-Jo, Because Music
- Producer: Mouloud Mansouri, Tony Danza

Singles from Shtar Academy
- 1. "Les portes du pénitencier" Released: December 11, 2013

Shtar Academy is the self-titled debut studio album by French hip hop collective Shtar Academy, consisting of rappers Badri, Malik and Mirak. It was released on 20 January 2014 by Fu-Jo, and distributed by Because Music, and peaked at number 63 on the French Albums Chart.

== Background ==
Shtar Academy was started as a musical project in 2012 by record producer Mouloud Mansouri, who had previously served a jail sentence between 1999 and 2008 for drug trafficking. He had the idea for his project approved by the administration of the Luynes Prison. The prison administration also approved the construction of the Studio Hip Hop Convict, where the album was recorded, within the prison compounds, but reserved the right to censor any proposed texts by the prisoners that were deemed excessively violent or aggressive towards prison wardens, or presenting menacing lyrics addressed to judges, the police or to victims of crimes.

Prisoners detained for a year or more in Luynes were eligible to showcase their potential talents. More than 200 prisoners, almost the entire population of the prison, were briefed on the project, and initially around 30 of them expressed an interest and signed up for the project. Through interviews and assessments, and test performances conducted by Mansouri and co-producer Tony Danza, the number of eligible applicants was reduced to a dozen and eventually three of the most talented were chosen through a competitive elimination process to spearhead the musical project. Badri received a sentence of seven years, while Malik and Mirak were sentenced to three and four years imprisonment respectively. For a whole year, the three worked regularly on various workshops for songwriting, composition, and training for recordings and computer-assisted production. More than 30 well-known French rappers and producers volunteered their time supporting the project through mentoring and coaching. They also provided studio time and agreed to be featured in compositions by the prisoners, which were presented during a three-hour live show on 3 June 2013.

== Single ==
"Les portes du pénitencier" was released as the album's lead single on 11 December 2013, but did not enter the French Singles Chart.

== Music videos ==
A number of music videos for a number of the album's songs were released before and after the release of the album.

- A live performance of "Passez-moi le micro" was released on 28 August 2013, and doubles up as the song's official music video.
- The music video for "Wesh les taulards" was released on 21 November 2013. Directed by Sarah Marx, the video was shot in an abandoned building in the absence of the members of Shtar Academy, as they were still incarcerated at the time. Several actors take the place of the three rappers.
- The official music video for "Primaire", featuring Lino, was released on 29 November 2013. It is primarily a lyric video, where the lyrics of the song appear as they are performed, along with other various illustrations in line with the song's lyrics.
- Two music videos were released for the regular (short) and long versions of "Les portes du pénitencier". They were both directed by Sarah Marx. The videos follow Mouloud Mansouri, who plays a prison inmate, as he lives through his sentence at the Hauts-de-Seine Prison and is finally released at the end of the video.
  - The regular version's music video was released on 11 December 2013, as part of the single's release. It features appearances by Mirak, Nekfeu, Nemir, Alonzo and Soprano as they perform their verses of the song.
  - Released on 3 January 2014, the music video for the long version of the song features an introduction to the story of Mansouri's life in prison, where the narrator also briefly speaks of Mansouri's life after prison and the formation of Shtar Academy. The rest of the artists featured in the song, except Keny Arkana, also make appearances in the video as they perform their verses of the song, including Orelsan and Gringe, who perform their verse together as the Casseurs Flowters.
- The music video for "Ça fait un bail", featuring Tunisiano, was released on 7 February 2014. It was shot at a prison, where Tunisiano plays an inmate being visited by his friend, Mirak, and features scenes where the two rap their bits of the song at a table as if they were having a conversation.

== Track listing ==
All songs produced by Mouloud Mansouri and Tony Danza.

No.	Title	Lyrics	Music	Length
1.	"Intro"	–	Mouloud Mansouri, Sadik Asken	0:42
2.	"Primaire" (featuring Lino)	Badri, Malik, Mirak, Gaëlino M'Bani	Mansouri, Asken
3.	"Wesh les taulards" (featuring DJ R-Ash)	Badri, Mirak	Médéline	4:23
4.	"Ça fait un bail" (featuring Tunisiano)	Badri, Mirak, Bachir Baccour	Stan & Tefa	3:23
5.	"Nos prières" (featuring Nassi)	Badri, Malik, Mirak, Nassi	Skalpovich	3:57
6.	"Années de plombs" (featuring Médine)	Badri, Malik, Mirak, Médine Zaouiche	Proof	6:03
7.	"Permission" (featuring Niro)	Badri, Noureddine Bahri	Ovaground Prod	3:21
8.	"Comme à l'usine" (featuring Leck and S-Pi)	Badri, Mirak, Foued El Ouazzani, Richard Molengo	Soopa	5:11
9.	"Ange et démon" (featuring Disiz)	Badri, Mirak, Sérigne Gueye	Hits Alive	4:04
10.	"Les portes du pénitencier (Version longue)" (featuring Bakar, Casseurs Flowters, Keny Arkana, Lino, Médine, Nor, Nekfeu, Némir, REDK, Sat, Alonzo, Soprano, Tékila and Vincenzo)	Badri, Malik, Bakar, Aurélien Cotentin, Guillaume Tranchant, Keny Arkana, M'Bani, Zaouiche, Nor, Ken Samaras, Némir, REDK, Karim Haddouche, Kassimou D'Jae, Saïd M'Roumbaba, Tékila, Iliassa Issilame	Blastar	11:30
11.	"R.A.P. rien à prouver" (featuring Ali)	Mirak, Yassine Sekkoumi	Roro	4:01
12.	"Permission 2" (featuring Mister You)	Mirak, Younès Latifi	Street Scientist Beat	1:27
13.	"Le trajet"	Badri, Malik, Mirak	Mansouri, Asken	4:06
14.	"Nostalgique" (featuring La Fouine)	Badri, Malik, Mirak, Laouni Mouhid	Mansouri, Asken	3:18
15.	"Chacun son rôle" (featuring Ladéa)	Badri, Malik, Mirak, Ladéa	Médéline	3:53
16.	"J'ferme les yeux"	Badri, Malik, Mirak, Asken	Mansouri, Asken	3:33
17.	"Libérable" (featuring Ekoué)	Badri, Malik, Mirak, Ekoué Labitey	Blastar, Cannibal Smith	3:13
18.	"Les portes du pénitencier" (featuring Nekfeu, Nemir, Alonzo and Soprano)	Badri, Malik, Mirak, Samaras, Némir, D'Jae, M'Roumbaba	Blastar	3:46
Total length:				74:13

== Credits ==
Credits for Shtar Academy adapted from Discogs.

=== Personnel ===
- Ali – Featured artist
- Alonzo – Featured artist
- Badri – Primary artist
- Bakar – Featured artist
- Blastar – Composition
- Cannibal Smith – Composition
- Disiz – Featured artist
- DJ R-Ash – Featured artist
- Doom Bada – Mixing
- Etienne M. – Mixing (assistant)
- Gringe – Featured artist
- Hits Alive – Composition
- Keny Arkana – Featured artist
- La Fouine – Featured artist
- Ladéa – Featured artist
- Leck – Featured artist
- Lino – Featured artist
- Malik – Primary artist
- Mirak – Primary artist
- Medeline – Composition
- Médine – Featured artist
- Mister You – Featured artist
- Mouloud Mansouri – Producer, composition
- Nekfeu – Featured artist
- Némir – Featured artist
- Niro – Featured artist
- Fred Nlandu – Mixing
- Nor – Featured artist
- Mitch Olivier – Mixing
- Nadir Photographie – Photography
- Orelsan – Featured artist
- Ovaground Prod – Composition
- Proof – Composition
- REDK – Featured artist
- Roro – Composition
- S-Pi – Featured artist
- Sat – Featured artist
- Skalpovich – Composition, mixing
- Soopa – Composition
- Soprano – Featured artist
- Street Scientist Beat – Composition
- Tékila – Featured artist
- Tony Danza – Producer, composition
- Tunisiano – Featured artist
- Vincenzo – Featured artist

=== Studios ===
- BPM Studio – Mixing
- Masterdisk Europe – Mastering
- Studio Hip Hop Convict – Recording
- Studio Davout – Mixing
- Studio Kilomaître Foundation – Mixing
- Studio Fabrik48 – Mixing

== Chart performance ==
Chart (2014)	Peak position
French Albums (SNEP)	63
