= Team BS =

French hip hop collective

- Origin: France
- Genres: Hip Hop
- Years active: 2013-present
- Labels: Banlieue Sale
- Members: La Fouine; Fababy; Sultan; Sindy Auvity (vocalist)

Team BS is a project and a hip hop collective of La Fouine launched in 2013, and an initiative of his record label Banlieue Sale, "BS" denoting actually the record label they work in. Collective Team BS is a collaboration of Banlieue Sale acts La Fouine, Fababy, Sultan and the vocalist Sindy the latter from the French television series Popstars where la Fouine was one of the judges. Also included in the collective is the French producer known as DJ Skalp / Skalpovich.

In 2013, the collective Team BS had a debuting charting success with the self-titled single "Team BS" (alternatively known as "Vrai frères"). The release was accompanied by a music video.

In January 2014, Team BS came up with a follow-up single "Case départ". They are working on an album to be released soon under the title Les affaires commencent.

== Discography ==
=== Album ===
| Year | Album | Peak positions | | |
| Year | Album | FR | BEL (Vl) | BEL (Wa) |
|---|---|---|---|---|
| 2014 | Team BS | 5 | 168 | 26 |

=== Singles ===
| Date | Singles | Credited to | Peak position FR | Peak position BEL (Wa) | Music video |
|---|---|---|---|---|---|
| December 2013 | "Team BS" | La Fouine, Fababy, Sindy & Sultan | 21 | 45 | |
| January 2014 | "Case départ" | Team BS | 30 | – | |
| March 2014 | "1.2.3." | Team BS | 42 | 46 | |
| March 2014 | "Fierté" | Team BS | 44 | 6* (Ultratip) | |
| March 2014 | "Ma verité" | Team BS | 101 | – | |
| March 2014 | "Je rappe" | Team BS | 198 | – | |

*Did not appear in the official Belgian Ultratop 50 charts, but rather in the bubbling under Ultratip charts.

== Discography (members) ==
- 2015: "Sans rancune" (Sindy feat. La Fouine) (FR (SNEP) peak: #174)
