= NGRTD =

Studio album by Youssoupha
- Released: 18 May 2015
- Genre: French rap, Conscious rap
- Label: Bomayé Music

Youssoupha chronology
Noir Désir (2012)	NGRTD (2015)

NGRTD (also known as Négritude) is the fourth studio album by French rapper Youssoupha, released on May 18, 2015 by Bomayé Music.

== Track listing ==
1. "Où est l'amour ?" (3:11)
2. "Salaam" (4:37)
3. "Points communs" (featuring Alonzo, Disiz, Lino, Médine or Sam's) (4:39)
4. "Maman m'a dit" (3:38)
5. "Memento" (featuring Les Casseurs Flowters) (3:38)
6. "Love Musik" (featuring Ayọ) (3:23)
7. "À cause de moi " (featuring Humphrey) (3:19)
8. "Chanson française" (3:00)
9. "Entourage" (5:00)
10. "Le score" (featuring Nemir) (3:41)
11. "Niquer ma vie" (4:29)
12. "Mannschaft" (4:53)
13. "Black Out" (3:39)
14. "Smile" (featuring Madame Monsieur) (3:41)
15. "Négritude" (4:27)
16. "Mourir mille fois" (5:01)
17. "Public Enemy" (3:57)

== Charts ==
Chart (2015)	Peak position
Belgian Albums (Ultratop Flanders)	82
Belgian Albums (Ultratop Wallonia)	6
French Albums (SNEP)	4
Swiss Albums (Schweizer Hitparade)	12
