= Team BS (album) =

Studio album by Team BS
- Released: 24 February 2014
- Genre: Rap, R&B
- Label: Banlieue Sale Music, S-Kal

Singles from Team BS
- 1. "Team BS" Released: November 2013; 2. "Case départ" Released: January 2014

Team BS is the debut title album of the French hip hop collective Team BS established in 2013 by La Fouine, and that includes in addition to him, Fababy, Sultan and vocalist Sindy, the latter from the French television series Popstars where la Fouine was one of the judges. "BS" denotes actually the record label they all work in, namely Banlieue Sale founded by La Fouine.

In 2013, the collective Team BS had a debuting charting success with the self-titled single "Team BS" (alternatively known as "Vrais frères"). The release was accompanied by a music video. In January 2014, Team BS came up with a follow-up single "Case départ".

In addition to "Team BS" and "Case départ", four further tracks from the album have charted based on downloads. These are "1.2.3.", "Fierté", "Ma verité" and "Je rappe".

== Track list ==
Track #	Song title	Writers	Producers	Length
1.	"Intro"	La Fouine, Fababy, Sultan, Sindy	Tommy Djibz	2:11
2.	"Case départ"	La Fouine, Fababy, Sultan, Sindy	Skalpovich	4:10
3.	"Team BS"	La Fouine, Fababy, Sultan, Sindy	Skalpovich	3:52
4.	"Ma musique"	La Fouine, Fababy, Sultan, Sindy	La Fouine & Jay Fase	3:42
5.	"Griot"	La Fouine, Fababy, Sultan, Sindy	Skalp & Amen Viana	4:49
6.	"Fierté"	La Fouine, Fababy, Sultan, Sindy	Skalp & Tommy Djibz	3:46
7.	"Ma vérité"	La Fouine, Fababy, Sultan, Sindy	Tommy Djibz	3:20
8.	"Interlude"	Sultan, Skalpovich	Tommy Djibz	0:19
9.	"Je rappe"	La Fouine, Fababy, Sultan	Skalpovich	3:58
10.	"Jamais assez"	La Fouine, Fababy, Sultan, Sindy	Skalpovich	4:13
11.	"1.2.3"	La Fouine, Sultan, Sindy	Tommy Djibz & La Fouine	3:15
12.	"Mon destin"	La Fouine, Sindy	Skalpovich	3:39
13.	"Pas de chance"	La Fouine, Fababy, Sultan, Sindy	Tommy Djibz & La Fouine	3:42
14.	"Souffle d'espoir"	La Fouine, Fababy, Sultan, Sindy	Skalpovich	4:24
15.	"Mes couleurs"	Sindy	Tommy Djibz, La Fouine & Nassi	2:48
16.	"Outro"	Sindy	Tommy Djibz	2:00

== Charts ==
=== Weekly charts ===
Chart (2014)	Peak position
Belgian Albums (Ultratop Flanders)	168
Belgian Albums (Ultratop Wallonia)	26
French Albums (SNEP)	5

=== Year-end charts ===
Chart (2014)	Position
Belgian Albums (Ultratop Wallonia)	187
French Albums (SNEP)	78

=== Charting singles ===
Date	Singles	Credited to	Peak position FR	Peak position BEL (Wa)	Music video
December 2013	"Team BS"	La Fouine, Fababy, Sindy & Sultan	21	45	YouTube
January 2014	"Case départ"	Team BS	30	–	YouTube
March 2014	"1.2.3."	Team BS	42	46	
March 2014	"Fierté"	Team BS	44	12* (Ultratip)	YouTube
March 2014	"Ma verité"	Team BS	101	–	YouTube
March 2014	"Je rappe"	Team BS	198	–	

*Did not appear in the official Belgian Ultratop 50 charts, but rather in the bubbling under Ultratip charts.
