= Shtar Academy =

French hip hop collective

- Origin: Luynes, Bouches-du-Rhône, France
- Genres: Hip hop
- Years active: 2012–present
- Label: Fu-Jo
- Members: Badri; Malik; Mirak
- Website: www.shtaracademy.com

Shtar Academy (also known as Shtar Ac) is a French hip hop collective that started in a prison, consisting of rappers Badri, Malik and Mirak, who served sentences of varying periods for different charges. It was founded in 2012 as a result of a pilot project at the Aix-en-Provence Prison in Luynes, Bouches-du-Rhône. They released their self-titled debut studio album Shtar Academy on 20 January 2014 through the Fu-Jo record label.

== Etymology ==
"Shtar" is a known synonym for cop or jail in French lingo. "Shtar Academy" is also a wordplay on the famous French reality television music competition series Star Academy, a long running series broadcast in various forms in a great number of countries and can be likened to Idols.

== History ==
=== Formation (2012) ===
Shtar Academy was started in 2012 within the walls of the French prison at Luynes. Producer and DJ Mouloud Mansouri proposed the idea to the Aix-en-Provence Prison administration, who agreed to go ahead. Mansouri had been involved in event organization in the Toulon area through his company Fu-Jo, and had previously served a sentence between 1999 and 2008 for drug trafficking. While incarcerated, and based on his contacts with various hip hop artists, he was able to organize a number of musical events, particularly in Val-de-Reuil Prison where he was incarcerated, inviting hip hop artists to perform for prisoners.

After getting initial approval in 2012 for a hip hop festival to be held in summer of 2013 at the Luynes Prison, with expected acts such as Cut Killer, Némir, Médine, Psy 4 de la Rime and Kery James amongst others, Mansouri proposed that the opening act be performed by a select number of prisoners presenting their compositions. The Shtar Academy project was formed as a result of this proposition. The prison administration agreed to the construction of a recording studio within the prison compounds, but reserved the right to censor any proposed texts by the prisoners that were deemed excessively violent or aggressive towards prison wardens, or presenting menacing lyrics addressed to judges, the police or to victims of crimes.

=== Selection and early work (2012–2013) ===
Prisoners detained for a year or more in Luynes were eligible to showcase their potential talent. More than 200 prisoners, almost the entire population of the prison, were briefed on the project, and initially around 30 of them expressed an interest and signed up for the project. Through interviews, assessments and test performances conducted by Mansouri and co-producer Tony Danza, the number of eligible applicants was reduced to a dozen and eventually three of the most talented were chosen through a competitive elimination process to spearhead the musical project. Badri received a sentence of seven years, while Malik and Mirak were sentenced to three and four years imprisonment respectively.

For an entire year, the three worked regularly on various workshops for songwriting, composition, and training for recordings and computer-assisted production. More than 30 well-known French rappers and producers volunteered their time supporting the project through mentoring and coaching. They also provided studio time and agreed to be featured in compositions by the prisoners, which were presented during a three-hour live show on 3 June 2013.

=== Shtar Academy (2013–present) ===
Their first official music video, for the song "Wesh les taulards", was released on 21 November 2013. However, it did not feature the three rappers, who were still incarcerated at the time, as it was felt their appearance in person would jeopardise their security, and as such several actors took their place in the video. Anticipation for the release of their debut studio album Shtar Academy was greatly heightened with the release of their debut single "Les portes du pénitencier" (the gates of the penitentiary) on 11 December 2013, featuring Nekfeu and Némir, as well as Alonzo and Soprano of Psy 4 de la Rime. A music video for the song was released as part of the single's release, and features appearances from Mirak as well as the four aforementioned artists as they perform their verses of the song. The music video for the long version of the song was released on 3 January 2014. Including the artists present in the short version, the song features Lino, Keny Arkana, Médine and the Casseurs Flowters (Orelsan and Gringe) among others.

== Members ==
The collective is made up of three (current and former) prison inmates.

- Badri was sentenced to 7 years and 6 months in prison on charges of burglary and theft. He is serving his sentence at the Aix-en-Provence Prison, and was still incarcerated at the time of the release of the group's debut studio album. Frequently mentioned as being the most talented of the three, legal proceedings are underway to secure a possible early release based on his contributions to the project. Although there have been many offers for Malik and Mirak to perform in a number of shows, they have declined, stating that they preferred to wait for Badri's release before performing in concerts.
- Malik (also known as Likma) was sentenced to 3 years and 2 months in prison for burglary and extortion. Having served most of his sentence at the Baumettes Prison, he was released early shortly before the release of the album for good conduct and as a sign of goodwill for his contribution to the project.
- Mirak was sentenced to 4 years in prison for drug trafficking. He was released early a month prior to release of album, serving most of his sentenced at the Toulon Prison, also due to good conduct and for his input in the project.

== Discography ==
Studio albums

- Shtar Academy (2013)
