= J'avais pas les mots =

Single by La Fouine

from the album Drôle de parcours
- Released: 19 November 2012
- Genre: French hip hop
- Length: 3:41
- Label: Banlieue Sale, Jive, Sony Music France
- Songwriter(s): Laouni Mouhid
- Producer(s): Luca Presti

La Fouine singles chronology
"Des pères, des hommes et des frères" (2011)	"J'avais pas les mots" (2012)	"Fête des mères" (2013)

Audio sample
- "J'avais pas les mots": file; help

Music video
- "J'avais pas les mots" on YouTube

"J'avais pas les mots" is a song by French rapper La Fouine and produced by Luca Presti (pka his old alias “So Loud”). It was released on November 19, 2012 as the lead single from his fifth studio album Drôle de parcours. It peaked at number 16 on the French Singles Chart, and at number 39 on the Belgian Ultratop Singles Chart in Wallonia.

== Music video ==
A music video for the song was released on La Fouine's VEVO channel on YouTube on 23 November 2012.

== Track listing ==
- Digital download
1. La Fouine - "J'avais pas les mots" – 3:41

== Charts ==
=== Weekly charts ===
Chart (2012)	Peak position
Belgium (Ultratop 50 Wallonia)	39
France (SNEP)	16

=== Year-end charts ===
Chart (2013)	Position
France (SNEP)	173
