= Zifou =

French rapper of Moroccan origin

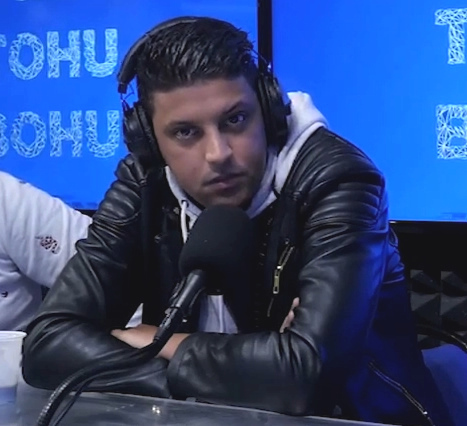
- Zifou in 2018

Background information
- Born: Faouzi Kojmane; 20 July 1992 (age 33); Sedan, France
- Genres: Hip hop
- Instrument: Vocals
- Years active: 2011–present
- Website: www.zifou.fr

Faouzi Kojmane, better known by his stage name Zifou, born July 20, 1992 in Sedan is a French rapper and singer of Moroccan origin.

== Life and Career ==
He grew up in Roissy-en-Brie and in Pontault-Combault. He gained fame through his online postings in particular his May 2011 posting of "Chicha toute la nuit".

In July 2012 he released his official debut single "C'est la hass" on Universal Music France followed by "On donne ça" that featured Léa Castel.

== Discography ==
=== Albums ===
Year	Album	Charts		Certification
Year	Album	BEL (Wa)	FR	Certification
2012	Zifou 2 dingue	148	24	

=== Singles ===
Year	Single	Charts	Certification	Album	Music videos
Year	Single	France	Certification	Album	Music videos
2012	"C'est la hass" (feat. La Fouine)	66		Zifou 2 dingue	
2012	"On donne ça" (feat. Léa Castel)	39		Zifou 2 dingue	

Other songs

- 2011: "Chicha toute la nuit"
