= Mes Repères =

Studio album by La Fouine
- Released: 23 February 2009
- Recorded: 2008
- Genre: Rap
- Producer: Canardo, Animals Sons

Mes Repères (pronounced [me ʁəpɛʁ]) is a 2009 album recorded by French rapper La Fouine. It was his third studio album and was released in France, Wallonia (and Brussels) and Romandy in February 2009.

== Track listing ==
1. 1. Du Ferme - 3:59
2. 2. Immortelles - 4:38
3. 3. Tous Les Mêmes - 4:20
4. 4. Rap Français - 3:53
5. 5. Ca Fait Mal - 4:30
6. 6. On Fait L'Taf - 4:44
7. 7. Interlude En Studio - 1:40
8. 8. De L'Or - 3:25
9. 9. Repartir A Zéro avec Soprano - 4:23
10. 10. Interlude Salam - 0:50
11. 11. Afrika - 3:22
12. 12. Moi Hamdoulah Ça Va avec Canardo - 4:35
13. 13. Rap Inconscient - 5:02
14. 14. Chips - 3:18
15. 15. Mes Repères - 3:48
16. 16. Je Sais Où Ça Ramène - 3:10
17. 17. La Mémoire Dans La Peau - 5:10
18. 18. Feu Rouge - 4:26
19. 19. Ça Fait Mal (Remix) avec Sefyu et Soprano - 4:32

== Charts ==
=== Weekly charts ===
Chart (2009)	Peak position
Belgian Albums (Ultratop Wallonia)	13
French Albums (SNEP)	2
Swiss Albums (Schweizer Hitparade)	70

=== Year-end charts ===
Chart (2009)	Position
French Albums (SNEP)	47
