= Des pères, des hommes et des frères =

Single by Corneille featuring La Fouine

from the album Les inséparables
- Released: 24 October 2011
- Length: 3:56
- Label: Wagram
- Songwriter(s): Cornélius Nyungura; Laouni Mouhid; Sofia de Medeiros
- Producer(s): Marco Volcy

Corneille singles chronology
"Le jour après la fin du monde" (2011)	"Des pères, des hommes et des frères" (2011)	"Jusqu'au bout de nos peines" (2012)

La Fouine singles chronology
"Vécu" (2011)	"Des pères, des hommes et des frères" (2011)	"J'avais pas les mots" (2012)

Audio sample
- file; help

Music video
- "Des pères, des hommes et des frères" on YouTube

"Des pères, des hommes et des frères" is a single by Canadian singer Corneille featuring French rapper La Fouine, and produced by Marco Volcy. Released on 24 October 2011 by Wagram Music, it peaked at number 2 on the Belgian Ultratip 50 Singles Chart in Wallonia, and at number 25 on the French Singles Chart.

== Music video ==
The music video for the song was shot in Montréal, Québec, and was released on 10 October 2011, before the single's release.

== Track listing ==
- Digital download
1. "Des pères, des hommes et des frères" (featuring La Fouine) – 3:56

== Chart performance ==
Chart (2011/2012)	Peak position
Belgium (Ultratip 50 Wallonia)	2
France (SNEP)	25
