= Sindy Auvity =

French singer (born 1995)

- Born: Sindy Auvity; 2 July 1995 (age 31); Royan
- Occupation: Singer
- Years active: 2013–present
- Website: sindyofficiel.com

Sindy Auvity (born 2 July 1995), commonly known mononymously as Sindy, is a French singer. She was the lead vocalist of the French hip hop band Team BS. After the success of the band's album, Sindy announced that she would be releasing her own solo album. Selfie was released in July 2015 and reached 25 in the French charts.

== Personal life ==
Sindy has revealed that she has been bullied in the past..

== Discography ==
Album	Release	Peak chart positions	
Album	Release	BEL	FRA
Selfie	Released: 10 July 2015; Label: Jive (Sony)	74	25
