= Banlieue Sale Music =

Single by La Fouine featuring Nessbeal

from the album Capital du crime, Vol. 2
- Released: 18 December 2009
- Genre: French hip hop
- Length: 4:19
- Label: Banlieue Sale
- Songwriter(s): Laouni Mouhid, Nabil Sahli

La Fouine singles chronology
"Du ferme" (2009)	"Banlieue Sale Music" (2009)	"Veni, vidi, vici" (2011)

Nessbeal singles chronology
"On aime ça" (2008)	"Banlieue Sale Music" (2009)	"Ça bouge pas" (2010)

Music video
- "Banlieue Sale Music" on YouTube

Audio sample
- file; help

"Banlieue Sale Music" is a song by French rapper La Fouine featuring fellow French rapper Nessbeal. It was released on 18 December 2009 by La Fouine's record label Banlieue Sale as the lead single from his fourth mixtape Capital du crime, Vol. 2, and peaked at number 15 on the Belgian Ultratip 50 Singles Chart in Wallonia.

== Music video ==
A music video for the song was released on La Fouine's channel on YouTube on 21 December 2009.

== Track listing ==
- Digital download
1. "Banlieue Sale Music" (featuring Nessbeal) – 4:19

== Chart performance ==
Chart (2010)	Peak position
Belgium (Ultratip 50 Wallonia)	15
