= Zaho =

Algerian-Canadian singer (born 1980)

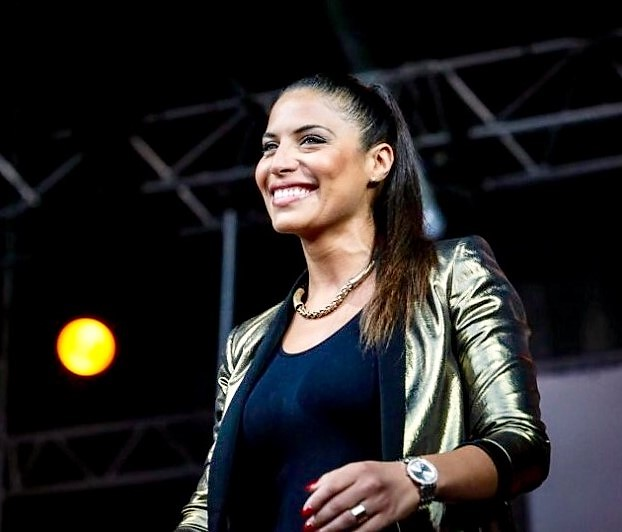

Background information
- Born: Zahera Darabid; May 10, 1980 (age 46); Bab Ezzouar, Algiers, Algeria
- Genres: R&B
- Occupation: Singer
- Years active: 1999–present
- Label: Parlophone

Zahera Darabid (Arabic: زهيرة درابيد ; born May 10, 1980), known by her stage name Zaho (/zɑːˈoʊ/), is an Algerian-Canadian R&B singer.

== Biography ==
Zahera Darabid was born on May 10, 1980, in Bab Ezzouar, a suburb of the Algerian capital Algiers. At the age of 18, she and her family moved to Montréal, Canada. Her father is an executive and her mother a mathematics professor. She has a brother and sister.

In December 1991, the civil war wreaked havoc in Algeria, and she was only 11 years old at the time. Cousins, neighbors, her swimming teacher, the manager of the café on her street, all disappeared. Her father, Mohamed, and her mother, Fadela, were even nearly killed in a market bombing she suffers from the state of emergency in the country and the generalized curfew. She longed for another life with her loved ones, far from war-torn Algeria. As a teenager, she dreamed of becoming an astronaut or a pilot, but soon realized that this was impossible in a country in the midst of civil war. So she began sending applications to universities abroad, but few if any arrived during the 1990s On December 31, 1998, she and her family moved to Montreal, Canada as part of a selective immigration program, as the country was looking for computer scientists. Before moving to Canada, her father was an executive at the Ministry of Planning, and her mother a professor of operational research at the National Institute of Informatics in Algiers. She declares that her family belonged to that intellectual class that had little money and whose only wealth was education She was shocked when she arrived in Montreal, having spent her youth in a country plagued by civil war. She recounts her exile in the song Kif'n'dir, featured on her debut album Dima. After three years in Canada, the ghosts of her past resurface, and she recounts how she sometimes even has panic attacks, standing motionless and stunned in the middle of the street recalling a time when she missed a bus that exploded a few meters away. For a long time, she says, she prevented herself from returning to Algeria, and blamed herself for having left part of her family there. A few years later, she reconnected with her homeland, returning to see her loved ones with arms full of gifts

After settling in, she continued her studies in Algeria, having passed her baccalaureate at the age of 16. She studied at the Université de Montréal in Canada. After studying for a computer engineer degree specializing in software development, she struggled to get into music. Her parents were desperate not to understand her obsession with music, even though she was valedictorian of her class

== Career ==
Zaho learned the guitar when she was seven years old, and very quickly learned the répertoire of Francis Cabrel within 10 years. In 1999, when she emigrated to Montreal, she discovered the world of professional music with its producers and its studios. She was seen with notable names in the French industry such as Idir, Tunisiano and Soprano.

In 2008, she released her debut album titled Dima, meaning Always in Arabic.

Zaho also has a strong writing background, writing the song "Tout ce temps" for Idir. Upon hearing the song, Idir insisted that she sang the song along with him.

In 2008, Zaho represented France in the 2008 MTV EMA's and won the Best European Artist award. She is well known in France and French Canada, and a lot of other places.

== Discography ==
=== Albums ===
Year	Album	Peak positions			Certifications
Year	Album	BEL (Wa)	FRA	SWI	Certifications
2008	Dima	36	11	—	
2012	Contagieuse	65	47	92	FR: Gold
2017	Le monde à l'envers	24	27	67	
2023	Résilience	128	10	—	
2026	Versatile	41	22	—	—

=== Mixtapes ===
- Zaho: La Mixtape (2007)

=== Singles ===
Year	Single	Peak positions				Album
Year	Single	BEL (Wa) Ultratop	BEL (Wa) Ultratip*	FRA	SWI	Album
2006	"Hey Papi" (featuring Soprano)	—	—	—	—	Dima
2008	"C'est chelou"	14	—	2	—	Dima
2008	"La roue tourne" (featuring Tunisiano)	—	4	15	—	Dima
2008	"Kif'n'dir"	—	—	33	—	Dima
2008	"Je te promets"	—	18	74	—	Dima
2012	"Boloss"	—	5	63	—	Contagieuse
2013	"Tourner la page"	—	9	19	62	Contagieuse
2016	"Laissez-les kouma" (featuring MHD)	36	—	33	—	Le monde à l'envers
2016	"Tant de choses"	—	—	109	—	Le monde à l'envers
2017	"Comme tous les soirs"	—	—	122	—	Le monde à l'envers
2021	"Ma lune"	—	—	103	—	Non-album release
2026	"Comme Caroline" (featuring MC Solaar)	15	—	—	—	Versatile

*Did not appear in the official Belgian Ultratop 50 charts, but rather in the bubbling under Ultratip charts.

=== Other charting songs ===
Year	Single	Peak positions	Album
Year	Single	FRA	Album
2013	"Tout est pareil"	148	
2013	"Encore un matin"	158	
2014	"Mon combat (Tir nam beo)" (with Florent Mothe)	187	from La légende du Roi Arthur
2016	"Sauver l'amour"	137	

=== Featured in ===
Year	Single	Peak positions			Certifications	Album
Year	Single	BEL (Wa) Ultratop	BEL (Wa) Ultratip*	FRA	Certifications	Album
2007	"Lune de miel" (Don Choa feat. Zaho)	—	—	21		
2010	"Hold My Hand" (Sean Paul feat. Zaho)	—	—	59		
2010	"Heartless" (Justin Nozuka feat. Zaho)	—	—	—		
2013	"Ma meilleure" (La Fouine feat. Zaho)	—	13	23		La Fouine album Drôle de parcours
2013	"Shooting Star" (Tara McDonald feat. Zaho)	—	16	150		
2016	"Parle-moi" (Black M feat. Zaho)	—	—	156		Black M album Éternel insatisfait
2016	"Le big mif" (Hornet La Frappe feat. Zaho)	—	—	159		

*Did not appear in the official Belgian Ultratop 50 charts, but rather in the bubbling under Ultratip charts.

=== Also featured in ===
- "Basta" by La Fouine, in "Bourré au son" (2005)
- "Halili" by Cheb Mami, in "Layali" (2006)
- "Un point c tout" by Sefyu, in "Qui suis-je?" (with Mina and Sana) (2006)
- "Lune de miel" by Don Choa, in "Jungle de béton" (2007)
- "Tout ce temps" by Idir, in "La France des couleurs" (2007)
- "La France des couleurs" by Idir, dans "La France des couleurs"
- "Citoyen du monde" by Tunisiano, in "Le Regard des gens" (2008)
- "Je m'écris" by Kery James, in "À l'ombre du show business" (with also Grand Corps Malade) (2008)
- "Quand ils vont partir" by Kamelancien, in "Le Frisson de la vérité"
- "T'est chelou", remix by "C'est chelou", by D.Dy in "T'aimes ou t'aimes pas" (2008)
- "Hold My Hand" (French Version), by Sean Paul (2010)
- "Heartless" by Justin Nozuka (2010)
- "Fais doucement" by Rohff, in "La cuenta" (2010)
- "Elle venait du ciel" by La Fouine in "La fouine vs laouni" (2011)
- "Indélébile" -Christophe Willem ft. Zaho (2011)
- "Ma Meilleure" – La Fouine feat Zaho (2013)
- "Shooting Star" – Tara McDonald feat Zaho (2013)
- "Du rêve" - TK feat Zaho (2020)

== Awards and nominations ==
- MTV Europe Music Awards 2008 : Meilleur artiste français
- NRJ Music Awards 2009 : Révélation francophone de l'année
- NRJ Music Awards 2011 : Groupe/Duo/Troupe francophone de l'année feat Justin Nozuka
- Prix de La Création 2011: Chanson international 2011 feat Sean Paul
- Trace Urban Music Award 2013 : Meilleure artiste féminine
- Trace Urban Music Awards 2013 : Meilleure collaboration feat La Fouine
- Berlin Music Video Awards 2022 : DOUCEMENT
