= Fababy =

French rapper and singer (born 1988)

- Also known as: F.A.B
- Born: Fabrice Ayékoué; 24 January 1988 (age 38); Paris, France
- Genres: Hip hop
- Occupations: Rapper, singer, songwriter
- Instrument: Vocals
- Years active: 2009–present
- Labels: Sony Music, Banlieue Sale

Fabrice Ayékoué (born 24 January, 1988, in Paris), better known by his stage name Fababy, is a French rapper, singer and songwriter of Ivorian origin.

== Career ==
In 2009, Fababy met rapper Despo Rutti, and appeared with him on a freestyle video called "La Saint-Valentin Featuring La Batte de Base Ball", posted on 14 February 2010, where he assumed the moniker F.A.B. He then appeared with Rutti on the radio station Planète Rap, to help promote Rutti's album, Conviction Suicidaire. Under the moniker Fababy, he recorded the track "Dans Nos Yeux" (In Our Eyes) on the compilation rap album Cosa Nostra by Juston Records, which was released on 1 March 2010. When the Cosa Nostra album was being promoted, he got to perform the track at the Nouveau Casino in Paris.

Fababy released his first solo music video titled, "Fuck L'amour" (Fuck Love) on 14 February 2011, one year after his first collaborative video. He also featured on the rap album Biography of Seven and released a clip entitled "L'etat nous baratine" on 31 March as a collaboration with French rap artist Seven. Shortly after, he released another clip "Crie 93" exclusively on rap website Booska-p. Fababy then signed on with recording label Banlieue Sale, run by French rapper La Fouine.

Fababy appears three times on La Fouine's album Capitale du Crime Vol. 3 with the tracks "J'arrive en balle" (I've come to the ball), "C'est bien" (It's Good), and "Jealousy". His mixtape Symphonie des Chargeurs Vol. 1 (The Symphony Chargers Volume 1) was released on 27 February 2012 which includes the tracks "La Symphonie des Chargeurs", "Du Mal à Dire", "Avec La Haine" and "Problème".

== Discography ==
=== Albums ===
Year	Album	Peak positions	
Year	Album	FR	BEL (Wa)
2013	La force du nombre	19	51
2016	Ange & Démon	50	76

=== Mixtapes ===
Year	Album	Peak positions
Year	Album	FR
2012	La symphonie des chargeurs	52

=== Singles ===
Year	Single	Peak positions		Album
Year	Single	FR	BEL (Wa)	Album
2013	"Wesh ma gueule" (feat. La Fouine)	143	–	
2015	"Love d'un voyou" (feat. Aya Nakamura)	9	37* (Ultratip)	

*Did not appear in the official Belgian Ultratop 50 charts, but rather in the bubbling under Ultratip charts.

=== Featured singles ===
Year	Single	Peak positions		Album
Year	Single	FR	BEL (Wa)	Album
2013	"Paname Boss" (La Fouine feat. Soprano, Niro, Youssoupha, Canardo, Fababy, Sultan 7)	54	42	La Fouine album Drôle de parcours
2013	"Team BS" (La Fouine, Fababy, Sindy & Sultan)	21	–	

=== Other featured work ===
- Capitale du Crime Vol. 3 (2011) – three tracks by La Fouine feat. Fababy
- "Ce Que Je Pense" (2012) – Soraya Hama feat. Fababy
- "93 Babies" (2012) – Sadek feat. Fababy
