= Sultan (rapper) =

French rapper (born 1987)

- Also known as: Sultan du Holster
- Born: Soultouane Benjadid; 24 April 1987 (age 39); Fontenay-aux-Roses, (Hauts-de-Seine), France
- Origin: Bagneux, (Hauts-de-Seine)
- Genres: Hip hop
- Occupations: Rapper; singer; songwriter; record producer
- Years active: 2004 – present
- Labels: Impact Records; S-Kal Records
- Formerly of: Holster

Soultouane Benjadid (Arabic: سلطان بن جديد; born 24 April 1987), better known as Sultan (earlier Sultan du Holster), is a French rapper originating from the Comoros. Prior to becoming a solo artist, he was part of the hip hop duo Holster with Ibrahim (I.B.R.).

== Career ==
Soultouane Benjadid was born in Fontenay-aux-Roses, (Hauts-de-Seine), France and resided in quartier Tertres-Cuverons in Bagneux, Hauts-de-Seine, where he started rapping at a very young age. In 1997, just 10, he presented his first lyrics to his brother H de l'île who was already a member of the hip hop collective Bagneux Instance Glauque (also including Diam's, Explicit Samouraï of Saïan Supa Crew and others).

In 2004, age 17, he released his demo and started cooperating with artists like Ks de l'île, 5ème Grif, La Sente, Le Système Auditif. With Ibrahim (I.B.R.), he formed a hip hop duo Holster taking the name Sultan du Holster. He found success with his release "92", a remake of Rohff hit "94". 92 refers to the different neighborhoods where he was living. He followed that in 2006 with his street album Mode crime with sales of 1500 copies sold. The track "Tah" gained great fame making him a noted artist in French rap. He also contributed the track "Mon peura arrache tout" and "Quoi qu'il arrive" that appeared in the compilation Talents fâchés 4 by Ikbal Vockal. Other tracks appeared on compilations like Ghetto truand and Rap Impact. He also contributed to rap mixtape project Frontline in 2007. He posted online "Trahison" in answer to Diam's featuring Vitaa release "Confessions nocturnes".

His official street album of 17 tracks called La Sul'tendance with the track "Quoi qu'il arrive" becoming the first single from the album in October 2009. The release was on Impact Records, an independent label he established with DJ Skorp and Mike. This was followed in October 2010 by another street album Tah You Ken!. Further tracks appeared on 2011 compilation Capitale du crime 3 (a La Fouine project) and in Booska Tape Vol. 1. He signed a contract with S-Kal Records in July 2011.

In 2012, he released his album Des jours meilleurs (originally named Le Cercle des incompris). The track "4 étoiles" featuring Rohff has become a great success for him. "4 étoiles" refers to the four stars on the flag of the Comoros. Rohff, like Sultan, is from the Comoros. The music video released on 22 June 2012 was filmed in Brazil. The single reached No. 45 in France. The album Des jours meilleurs released on 5 November 2012 has reached No. 15 in the French Albums Chart in its first week of release.

== Discography ==
=== Albums ===
Year	Album	Peak positions		Certification
Year	Album	BEL Wa	FR	Certification
2009	La Sul'tendance	—	182	
2012	Des jours meilleurs	135	15	
2016	Condamné à régner	—	33	

=== Mixtapes ===
in Holster

- 2006: Mode crime [Armurerie Musik]
- 2007: Holstape Volume 1

solo

- 2007: Frontline
- 2009: Avant La Sul'tendance [Impact Records]
- 2010: Tah You Ken! [Impact Records/Musicast L'autreprod]
- 2011: Ils Sont Pas Prêts [S-Kal Records]
  - 2012: Ils Sont Pas Prêts [S-Kal Records] (Rerelease with 3 additional tracks)

=== Singles ===
Year	Single	Peak positions		Certification	Album
Year	Single	BEL Wa	FR	Certification	Album
2012	"4 étoiles" (feat. Rohff)	32* (Ultratip)	45		Des jours meilleurs
2012	"Sois fier de c'que t'es"	–	76		Des jours meilleurs
2015	"Rapta Tonight" (feat. Pop & Croma)	–	67		
2015	"Piqué" (feat. David Carreira)	–	–		

*Did not appear in the official Belgian Ultratop 50 charts, but rather in the bubbling under Ultratip charts.

Other (non-charting) releases

- "Qui aura ma peau?" (feat. Youssoupha, R.e.d.k., Canardo)
- "Badaboom"
- "Fin de toi"
- "Zbeul Tonight" (remix)

Featured in

Year	Single	Peak positions		Album
Year	Single	BEL Wa	FR	Album
2013	"Team BS" (La Fouine, Fababy, Sindy & Sultan)	–	21	
2016	"Ça plaisante pas" (DJ Sem feat. Sultan)	–	55	
