= Médine (rapper) =

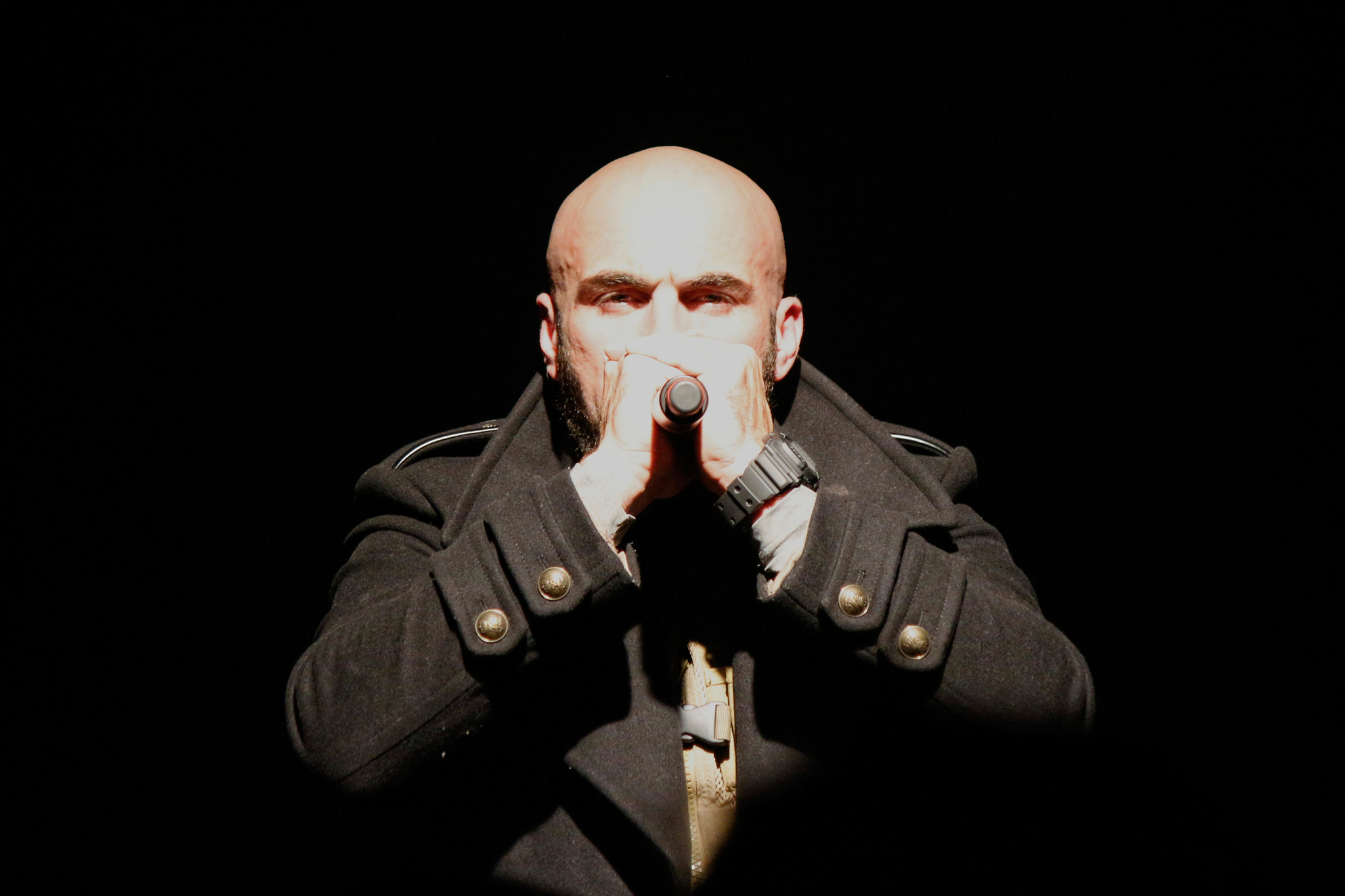
- Médine in concert at Sevran

Background information
- Also known as: Arabian Panther, Boulehya
- Born: Médine Zaouiche; 24 February 1983 (age 43); Le Havre, Seine-Maritime
- Genres: French rap, political hip hop
- Occupation: Rapper
- Years active: 2002–present
- Label: Din Records

Médine Zaouiche (French pronunciation: [medin zawiʃ]; born 24 February 1983 in Le Havre), better known by his stage name Médine (French for Medina), is a French rapper. He has been a part of the hip hop band La Boussole since 1996. Médine is a practicing Muslim, and many of his lyrics deal with the hardships of migrants, oppressed individuals, and Muslims in the Western world. One article he wrote for Time magazine after the 2005 riots was entitled "How Much More French Can I Be".

== Biography ==
=== Origins and youth ===
His father, born in Algeria, arrived in France when he was four years old. He worked as an employee in a packaging company and as a semi-professional boxer then trainer. His mother was born in France. A stay-at-home mother, she then became a childminder. Médine grew up in Le Havre, in Caucriauville.

=== Médine France and tour ===
In May 2022, Médine released his album Médine France on 13 May and announced a tour of France. The tour will begin at festivals on 4 June and will notably pass through the Casino of Paris on 19 October 2022.

== Discography ==
=== Projects ===
Year	Album	Peak positions			Certifications
Year	Album	FRA	BEL (Wa)	SWI	Certifications
2004	11 Septembre (Récit du 11ème jour)	—	—	—	
2005	Jihad (Le plus grand combat est contre soi-même)	—	—	—	
2006	Table d'écoute	115	—	—	
2008	Don't Panik Tape	30	—	—	
2008	Arabian Panther	30	—	—	
2011	Table d'écoute 2	28	81	—	
2012	Made In	117	—	—	
2013	Protest Song	9	25	82	
2015	Démineur	54	46	—	
2017	Prose élite	11	29	39	
2018	Storyteller	10	16	37	
2020	Grand Médine	4	15	47	
2022	Médine France	4	29	59	
2025	Stentor: Act I	—	188	—	

=== Singles ===
Year	Single	Peak positions			Album
Year	Single	FRA	BEL (Wa)	SWI	Album
2012	"Biopic" (featuring Kayna Samet)	143	—	—	
2016	"Rappeur de force"	136	—	—	Prose élite
2016	"Global"	173	—	—	Prose élite
2017	"Grand Paris" (featuring Lartiste, Lino, Sofiane, Alivor, Seth Gueko, Ninho & Youssoupha)	64	—	—	Prose élite
2018	"Kyll" (Médine x Booba)	2	34	62	Non-album single
2020	"Grand Paris 2" (feat. Koba LaD, Pirate, Larry, Oxmo Puccino & Rémy)	—	—	—	

== See also ==
- Kery James
