= Canardo (rapper) =

French rapper and singer

- Born: Hakim Mouhid; 22 September 1984 (age 41); Trappes, Yvelines, France
- Genres: French hip hop
- Occupations: Rapper; singer; songwriter; record producer

Hakim Mouhid (born 22 September, 1984, in Trappes), better known by his stage name Canardo, is a French rapper, singer, songwriter and record producer. After working with label "Banlieue Sale Music" since 2007, in 2011, he founded his own label "Henijai Music". He is the younger brother of fellow French rapper La Fouine.

== Career ==
He is the youngest of seven children in an immigrant family from Morocco. His father was a musician. He started rapping with the French rap band Trappiste La Smala and his first recording under his first name Hakim was "J'ai des dettes" on a street CD Planète Trappes Vol. 1 released by his brother La Fouine. He produced La Fouine's album Aller-Retour in 2007. His first commercial success came with his "Capitale du Crime" in the mixtape Capitale du Crime 1 followed by another success with "Hamdoulah moi ça va" asa duo with La Fouine and appearance in Capitale du Crime 2 with "Iblis" and other featurings.

In 2008, Canardo co-founded with his brother La Fouine their own label called "Banlieue Sale Music". This independent label, forged a partnership with Sony-BMG, one of the biggest music labels in the world. Banlieue Sale has subsidiaries that are "S-Kal Records" (created by the managers of La Fouine) and "Henijai Music" (created by Canardo). Artists signed on Banlieue Sale include Green, MLC, Chabodo, M.A.S, Evaanz, Fababy and Sindy.

On 21 June 2010, he released his first solo album Papillon with "Je ne perds pas le nord" being his first single from the album, followed by "Bismillah" and "Le Chant du ghetto". The track "Ailleurs" with guitar and vocals was dedicated to his home country Morocco. In the album, there are collaborations with La Fouine, Gappy Ranks, Green Money, M.A.S, MLC, Mokho'kaine, Gued'1, B.S.M and Chabodo. The self-produced album included inputs from Cutee B, Clément (of Animalson) and Félipé for interpreting tracks and for Grégoire, Diam's, Oxmo Puccino and others for writing some tracks. Owed to the success of Papillon, he made other tracks available through a mixtape and as free download from a release he entitled Papillon II. Popular tracks included "Déconne", "Un rayon de lumière" and "Banlieue Sale Technique", the latter featuring Jmi Sissoko. On mixtape Papillion II there are additional featurings by Disiz la Peste, MLC, Sultan, Sofiane and B.R.

On 16 July 2012, Canardo released his commercially successful mixtape A la youv with first single being "Mele Me", with other tracks like "A ce qu'il parait", "Mauvais plan", "On encaisse", "J'suis trop haan" and "ça vient de Paris". The mixtape contains a great number of collaborations including S.pri noir, Still Fresh, Mister You, Anissa, Orelsan and Gringe, Sultan, M.A.S, Tieck, La Fouine, B.R., Sofiane, LECK, Seth Gueko and La Fouine. His duo with Tal resulted in a single "M'en aller". Canardo is planning on a studio album in 2013.

== In popular culture ==
- About the origin of his name Canardo, Hakim tells the story that while he was young, he launched a taunt on three passersby repeating the catchphrase from La Haine "Yé vais tous vous niquer, toi, lui, elle" and the name stuck as his friends started calling him Canardo as reference to the La Haine character...
- In July 2010, he had a feud with French-Moroccan rapper H-Montana who accused him of plagiarism on a track H-Montana had made called "Henijay" and later on Canardo used Henijai as a name associated to himself.
- In September 2010, Canardo was invited to Taratata hosted by Nagui. The episode was broadcast on 7 January 2011.
- On 10 July 2012, he released a free online track "Super fréro" dedicated to his brother La Fouine.

== Discography ==
=== Albums / Mixtapes ===
Year	Album / Mixtape	Peak positions		Certification	Notes
Year	Album / Mixtape	BEL Wa	FR	Certification	Notes
2010	Papillon	–	23		
2010	Papillon II (Mixtape)	–	–		
2012	À la youv (Mixtape)	85	23		

=== Singles ===
Year	Single	Peak positions		Certification	Album	Music videos
Year	Single	FR	BEL Wa	Certification	Album	Music videos
2012	"M'en aller" (feat. Tal)	12	46		À la youv	

Featured in

Year	Single	Peak positions		Album
Year	Single	FR	BEL Wa	Album
2013	"Paname Boss" (La Fouine feat. Sniper, Niro, Youssoupha, Canardo, Fababy, Sultan 7)	54	42	La Fouine album Drôle de parcours
2014	"Peace sur le FN" (La Fouine feat. Canardo, Sultan & GSX)	163	–	
