= Youssoupha =

French and Congolese rapper (born 1979)

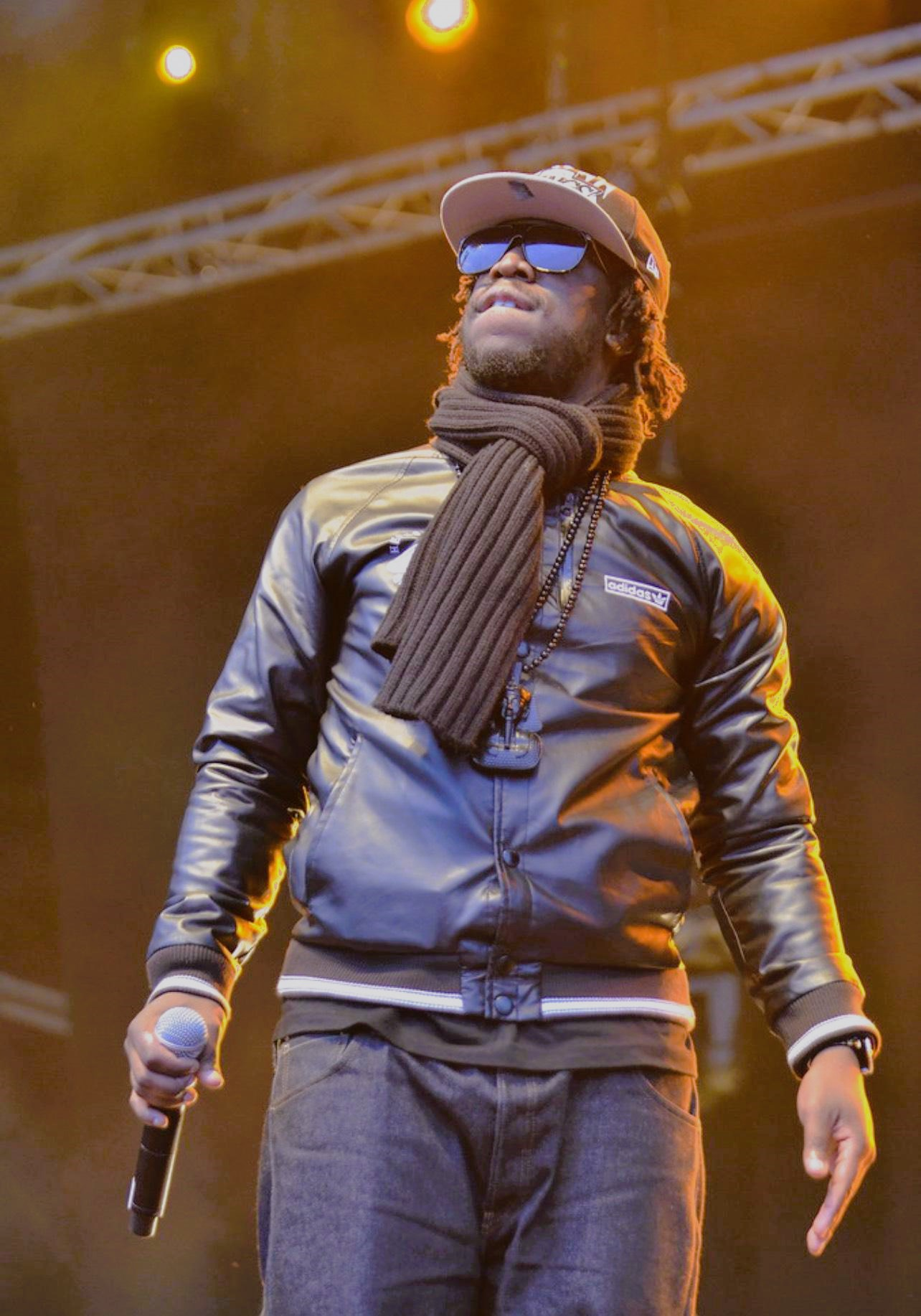
- Youssoupha performing in Brussels, Belgium

Background information
- Born: Youssoupha Mabiki; 29 August 1979 (age 47); Kinshasa, Democratic Republic of Congo
- Genres: French rap; conscious rap
- Years active: 2005–present
- Label: Bomayé Musik
- Members: solo

Youssoupha Mabiki (French pronunciation: [jusufa mabiki]; born 29 August 1979), better known by his nickname Youssoupha is a French and Congolese rapper.

== Early life and career ==
He was born to a Congolese father, the musician and Congo-Kinshasa political figure Tabu Ley Rochereau and a Senegalese mother. After spending his childhood in Congo-Kinshasa, at the age of 10, he moved to France to live with relatives in Beziers, then Osny, Cergy and Sartrouville. He finished his French baccalauréat at Académie de Versailles with high grades and continued with Cultural Mediation, Communication at Roanne and La Guillotière. After obtaining his master's degree, he dedicated himself to music.

His first album Frères Lumières was a trio with two other friends. They released a maxi single. He was also involved in many musical projects including the album Tendance by the band Bana Kin (with Sinistre Kozi Philo and Mic genie).

His own street DVD was released at end of 2005 as Eternel Recommencement followed in 2006 and was signed to Hostile record label. After working with a number of renowned rappers, he released his debut studio album in March 2007 titled À chaque frère ("To Every Brother") containing collaborations from Diam's, Kool Shen, S'Pi and Mike Génie.

His second album came out in October 2009 called Sur les chemins du retour ("On the Ways of Return"), alongside an international tour. In preparation of his third album, he also released a downloadable Digi-tape En noir et blanc - En attendant Noir Désir ("Black & White, Waiting for Black Desire") where he included some remixes of the album. In January 2012, he released his third studio album Noir désir ("Black Desire") featuring Taipan, Corneille, S-Pi, Sam's, Indila, LFDV and his own father Tabu Ley Rochereau"

On 22 April 2025, Youssoupha—alongside co-headliners Fally Ipupa and Gims—curated and led a sold-out benefit concert, Solidarité Congo, at the Accor Arena. The philanthropic event, which assembled 30 prominent artists from the French rap scene as well as internationally acclaimed and Congolese artists, sought to mobilize resources for children impacted by the Rwandan-backed M23 insurgency in eastern DRC. The entirety of the proceeds was designated for Dadju's Give Back Charity. Initially slated for 7 April, the event was postponed in observance of the International Day of Remembrance of the 1994 Rwandan genocide.

== In popular culture ==
- He took part as songwriting teacher at the French reality television program Popstars.
- In 2009, French journalist Éric Zemmour opened a lawsuit against him accusing him of public threats for diabolizing the banlieues. Youssoupha responded in an interview with Le Parisien that he advocated non-violence, but was pointing out the contradictions of Zemmour. He also responded with his single Menace de mort (meaning Death threat in English) with clips from various television programs quoting anti-immigrant sentiments expressed by media figures.
- His song La Foule featured in the second episode of the first season of the Amazon streaming series The Boys.

== Accolades ==
- MTV Africa Music Awards 2014 - Best Francophone (Nominated)

== Decorations ==
- Chevalier of the Order of Arts and Letters (2016)

== Discography ==
=== Albums ===
Year	Album	Charts				Notes
Year	Album	FR	BEL (Fl)	BEL (Wa)	SWI	Notes
2007	À chaque frère	32	—	—	—	
2009	Sur les chemins du retour	21	—	—	—	
2011	En noir et blanc - En attendant Noir Désir (Digitape)	117	—	—	—	
2012	Noir Désir	3	—	7	—	Also known as Noir D****
2013	On se connaît	138	—	—	—	
2015	NGRTD	4	82	6	12	Also known as Négritude
2018	Polaroïd Experience	12	—	18	32	
2021	Neptune Terminus	9	—	9	25	

=== Singles ===
Year	Single	Charts			Album
Year	Single	FR	BEL (Wa)	SWI	Album
2011	"Menace de mort"	43	–	–	Noir desir
2012	"Histoires vraies" (feat. Corneille)	75	–	–	Noir desir
2012	"Dreamin'" (feat. Indila & Skalpovich)	14	–	65	Noir desir
2012	"On se connait" (feat. Ayna)	9	7	61	Non-album release
2014	"Boma Yé"	138	–	–	
2015	"Smile"	54	–	–	NGRTD

=== As featured artist ===
Year	Single	Charts		Album
Year	Single	FR	BEL (Wa)	Album
2012	"I Know" (Remix Street version)" (Irma feat. Youssoupha)	138	–	Letter to the Lord
2013	"Paname Boss" (La Fouine feat. Sniper, Niro, Youssoupha, Canardo, Fababy, Sultan 7)	54	42	Drôle de parcours
2013	"Il se passe quelque chose" (La Fouine feat. Youssoupha)	101	–	Drôle de parcours
2013	"Coeur de Guerrier" (Big Ali feat. Corneille, Youssoupha and Acid)	–	–	Urban Electro
2013	"Kitoko" (Fally Ipupa feat. Youssoupha)	–	–	Power World
2013	"Fire" (Ayọ feat. Youssoupha)	–	–	Ticket to the World
2016	"Bada Bing" (Cris Cab feat. Youssoupha)	104	33	
2016	"Musique nègre" (Kery James feat. Lino & Youssoupha)	112	–	
2017	"Grand Paris" (Médine feat. Lartiste, Lino, Sofiane, Alivor, Seth Gueko, Ninho & Youssoupha)	65	–	
2017	"Pourquoi chérie" (BMYE feat. Naza, KeBlack, Youssoupha, Hiro, Jaymax & DJ Myst)	24	43	
2017	"La danse du matin" (BMYE feat. Hiro, Naza, Jaymax, Youssoupha, KeBlack & DJ Myst)	177	–	
2018	"PLMV" (Médine feat. Kery James & Youssoupha)	194	–	
2022	"W.A.G" (Rouge feat Sarkodie &Youssoupha)			
2025	Demain tout ira mieux (Youssef Swatt's feat. Youssoupha)	–	–	Chute Libre

=== Other charting songs ===
Year	Single	Charts	Album
Year	Single	FR	Album
2012	"Les disques de mon père" (feat. Tabu Ley Rochereau)	137	
2015	"Entourage"	77	NGRTD
2015	"Public Enemy"	158	NGRTD
2015	"Love Musik"	168	NGRTD
2018	"Polaroïd Experience"	131	Polaroïd Experience
2021	"Kash" (feat. Dinos & Lefa)	96	
2021	"Mon roi"	198	

== See also ==
- French hip hop
