= La Fouine =

French rapper (born 1981)

- Photo collage featuring the French rapper La Fouine.

Background information
- Also known as: Fouiny Baby; Fouiny Babe; Fouiny; Fouine-La
- Born: Laouni Mouhid; 25 December 1981 (age 44); Trappes, Yvelines, Île-de-France, France
- Genre: French hip hop
- Occupations: Rapper; singer; songwriter; businessman
- Years active: 2001–present
- Labels: Sony Music Entertainment; Banlieue Sale

Laouni Mouhid (Arabic: لاوني محيد, pronounced [laːwniː muːħiːd]; born 25 December 1981), commonly known by his stage name La Fouine (French pronunciation: [la ˈfwin]; lit. 'The beech marten'), as well as Fouiny (/fwiːni/), is a French rapper and singer. He is the founder of record label Banlieue Sale and the clothing line Street Swagg. La Fouine was voted Best French Artist at the MTV Europe Music Awards in 2011 and Best Male Artist at the Trace Urban Music Awards in 2013. With two million subscribers on YouTube, seven million on Facebook, and four million on Twitter, he was the most-followed French rapper on social media in 2015. Known as "the rapper with the goatee," he eventually shaved it off in June 2016.

La Fouine has sold over one million albums. On 26 October 2004, he released his first mixtape, titled Planète Trappes. The following year, he released his first album, Bourré au Son. He released his second album, Aller-Retour, in 2007, which was certified double gold. With his growing fame, Laouni released a series of albums and mixtapes annually. He released Mes repères in 2009, followed by La Fouine vs Laouni in 2011, both went platinum. In 2013, the rapper published a book and an album, both titled Drôle de Parcours. The album sold over 200,000 copies and has been certified gold.

La Fouine, known for his Capitale du Crime mixtapes, released four compilations from the series in 2008, 2010, 2011, and 2014, with the last three all being certified gold. In 2014, in collaboration with Sindy, Sultan, and Fababy, he released the pop project Team BS, which was certified gold within just a few weeks. In 2016, he released the album Nouveau Monde, which sold approximately 10,000 copies in one month. In May 2017, during the Mawazine Festival in Morocco, La Fouine achieved the largest audience of his career, with 150,000 people attending his concert.

== Personal life ==
Born in Trappes in a family of seven children to Moroccan parents from Casablanca, Laouni grew outside Paris in the Yvelines. He is the penultimate of his six brothers and sisters, Hakim (aka the rapper Canardo), Kamel, Illham, Samira, Naima and Adil. La Fouine talked about this in "Je regarde là-haut".

He left school at the age of fifteen to devote himself to rap and took his first music lessons. La Fouine, who was called "Forcené" was an active member of the collective "GSP". It was part of the short-lived group "FORS" with DJ RV (Hervé), Le Griffon (Tarek Medimegh) And LaylaD (Layla Melloni Forcé), created mainly to participate at 2 R puissance ART in La Verrière, where he won the second prize. La Fouine endured challenging times while in foster homes and prisons. "I was only fifteen when I was expelled from school and placed in foster homes. I became an insomniac for most of the time. But it did not take me to sleep with me, if the cops were looking for me directly. I slept with people in cars, premises, etc.. It was misery", he said to the magazine Planète Rap.

== Career ==
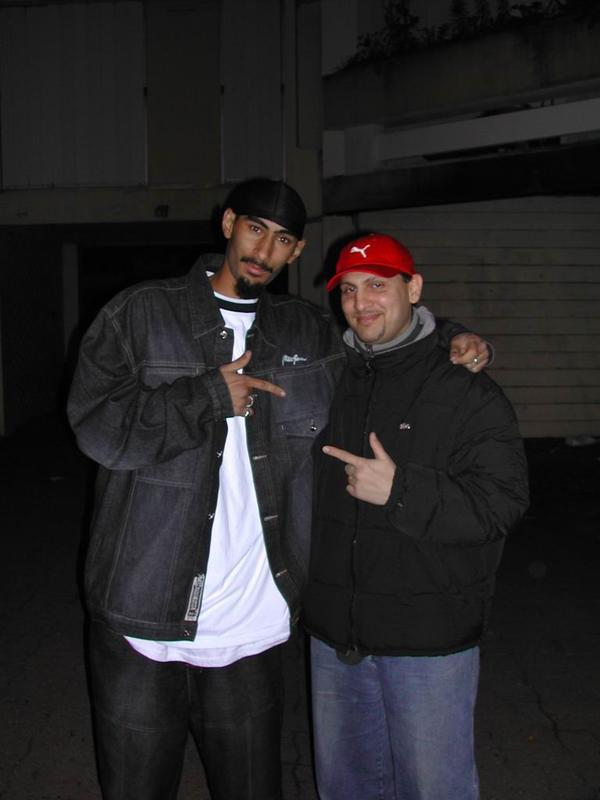
La Fouine and Le Griffon, November 2004

=== 2005: Bourré au Son ===
After releasing his first street-tape Planète Trappes that made him earn an early legitimacy in rap, he released his first album in 2005 called Bourré au Son strongly marked by the California style. The singles "L'unité" and "Quelque chose de spécial" meet critical acclaim and broadcast on many French radio stations.

=== 2007: Aller-Retour ===
After putting out Planète Trappes Volume 2 on the market launching especially his brother Canardo through three titles, La Fouine released his second album entitled Aller-Retour on 12 March 2007. The first single from this album was "Reste en Chien" with Booba. The second single was titled "Qui peut me stopper", "Banlieue Sale" with Gued'1 & Kennedy and "Tombé pour elle" with Amel Bent. Today, this album is certified gold.

=== 2009: Mes Repères ===
After releasing the street-tape Capitale du Crime which highlights the rappers of Yvelines, the third album of the rapper Mes Repères released in February 2009 and received a gold disc certification in October 2009. It included three guest appearances especially with Soprano on "Repartir à zéro" and still with Soprano and Sefyu on "Ca fait mal (Remix)" and Canardo (his younger brother) on "Hamdoulah Moi Ca Va". Today, this album is certified platinum.

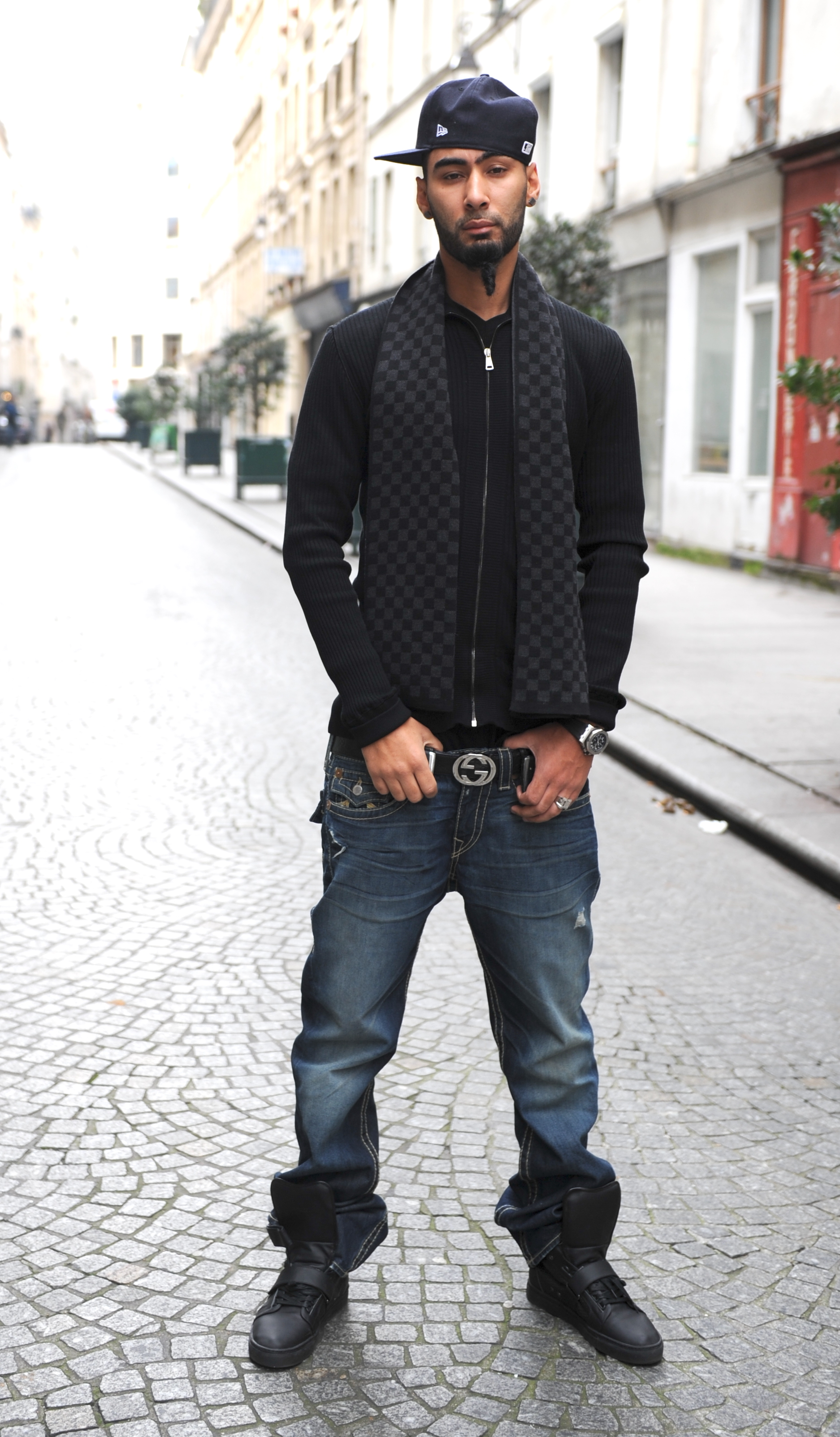
La Fouine posing in Paris, 2011

=== 2010: Capitale du Crime Volume 2 ===
The disk Capitale du Crime Volume 2 released on 18 January 2010, ranks third in the album sales in France in the first week of its release. On this album are collaborations with Canardo, Green Money, Kennedy, Vincenzo, Chabodo, A2P Rickwell, Gued'1...

In April 2010, La Fouine worked with Admiral T & Medine on the piece "Viser la Victoire", extract the Admiral-T's album entitled L'Instinct Admiral and so on Street Lourd II with the song "Dans nos quartiers" in collaboration with Alonzo and Teddy Corrona. Nowadays, this mixtape is certified gold.

=== 2011: La Fouine vs Laouni ===
The first single from her double album La Fouine vs Laouni is "Passe-leur le salam" featuring Rohff. "Veni, vidi, vici" is the second single and the third extract "Caillera for Life" is a collaboration with California rapper The Game in which The Game tried performing in French. And the fourth from the album entitled "Papa" is a track where La Fouine speaks about his father. The fifth single was released on 21 January 2011 called "Les Soleils de Minuits".

La Fouine revealed the list of titles, but also the production of the album on 21 January 2011. The music is especially tracks with Street Fabulous, Animalsons, Dj E-Rise Skalp, etc., while his brother Canardo appears on the microphone on "Bafana Bafana (Remix)".

On 7 May 2011, La Fouine had a concert at the Zenith in Paris, That evening, he performed with Zaho the title "Quand ils vont partir". Moreover, some time after, Kamelancien signed with the label of La Fouine's managers "S-Kal Records". Other notable rappers followed such as Sultan.

La Fouine released a reissue of the album on 15 June 2011. While waiting his new mixtape Capital Crime Vol. III, La Fouine released a new edition of La Fouine vs Laouni entitled La Fouine et Laouni including twelve songs of his double album with an unpublished remix "Toute la night" produced by Majestic Drama and "Veni, vidi, vici" remixed by Dj Battle featuring Francisco. Today, this album is certified platinum.

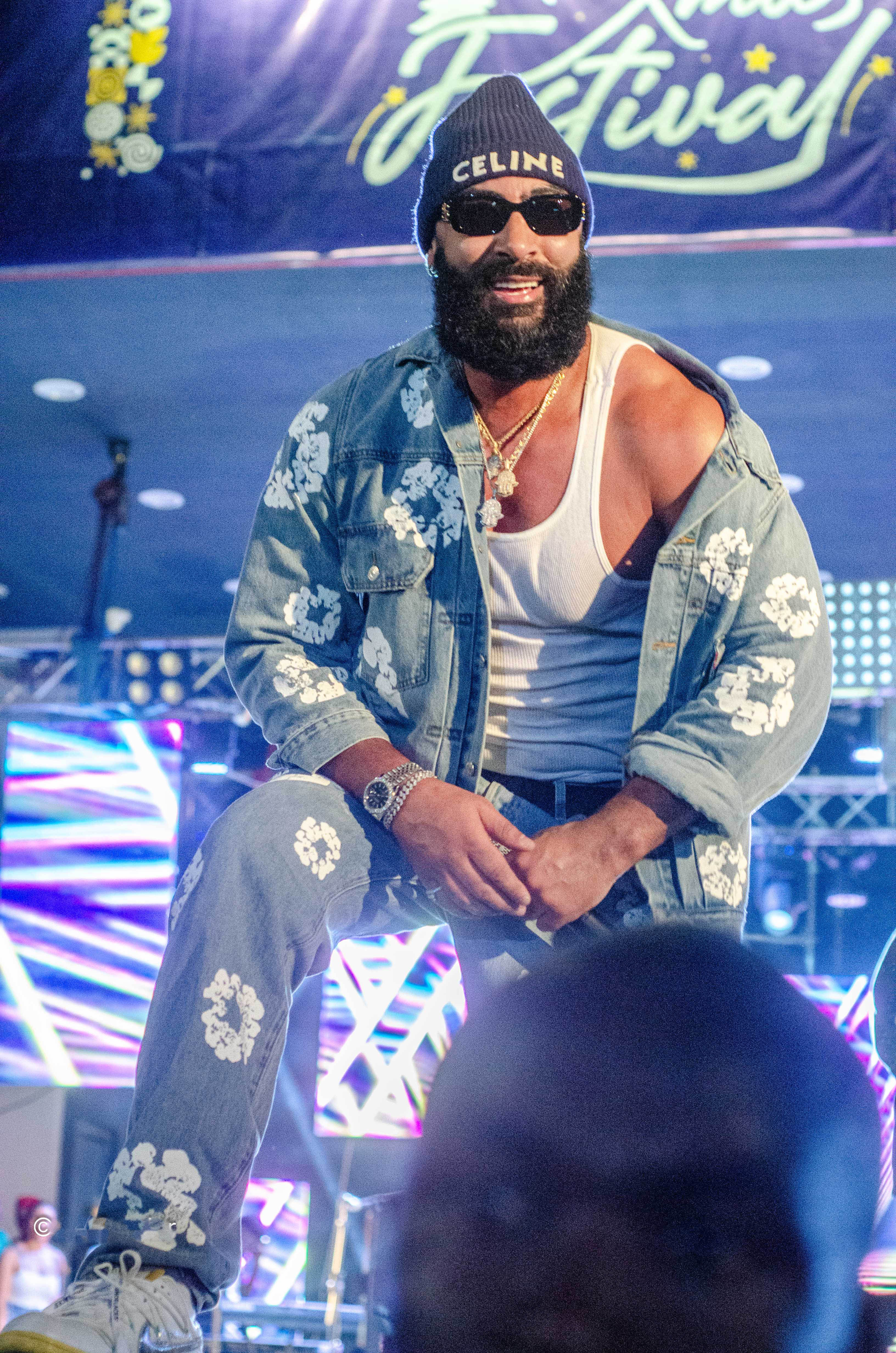
La Fouine performing in Cameroon, December 2023

=== 2012: Capitale du Crime Volume 3 ===
Capitale du Crime Volume 3 was released on 28 November 2011. It contained many guest appearances with American stars such as T-Pain on "Rollin' Like a Boss", DJ Khaled at production on "VNTM.com" and Ace Hood on "T'es mort dans le film". The mixtape sold over 62,000 copies until March 2012 and was certified gold. Meanwhile, he joined the group Trappes Stars created by his former manager Bodé. Trappes Stars was composed of some rappers of Trappes region such as Canardo, Green, MAS, Chabodo, Gued'1 or the A2P. All gathered on a compilation mixed by DJ Battle.

=== 2013: Drôle de Parcours ===
On 10 September 2012, La Fouine revealed on social networks the title of his new album entitled Drôle de Parcours. The first single from the album was "Paname Boss" and released on 2 November 2012. This single featured Sniper, Niro, Youssoupha, Canardo, Fababy and Sultan. 6 November 2012, La Fouine released the second single from Drôle de Parcours called "J'avais pas les mots". The third single is "Ma Meilleure" in featuring Zaho. 60,000 copies of the album were sold and the album was certified gold.

=== 2014: Team BS ===
Team BS was a project and a hip hop collective of La Fouine launched in 2013, and an initiative of La Fouine's record label Banlieue Sale, "BS" denoting actually the record label they work in. The collective was made up of acts La Fouine, Fababy, Sultan and the vocalist Sindy the latter from the French television series Popstars where la Fouine was one of the judges. French producer Pascal Lemaire known as DJ Skalp / Skalpovich was also part of the collective.

In 2013, Team BS had a debuting charting success with the self-titled single "Team BS" (alternatively known as "Vrai frères"). The release was accompanied by a music video. In January 2014, Team BS came up with a follow-up single "Case départ".

=== 2024–present: Recent projects ===
Following the release of his album XXI in 2021, La Fouine continued his musical career with the mixtape Capitale du Crime Radio in 2024 and the album État des Lieux in 2025. In early 2026, he was seen at various events and collaborative projects, maintaining his presence as a leading figure in French hip hop.

== Clashes ==
=== With Kamelancien ===
Early 2005, La Fouine responded with his title "Ferme ta gueule" to Kamelancien who attacked him as "twisted face" in the song "Reste vrai". Kamelancien soon turned up with his new response titled "Crise Cardiaque" and openly threatened him on a TV programme. This clash between the two Moroccan rappers, was a sort of clash with completely different style, one from Oujda and representing the Val-de-Marne and the other a native of Casablanca, representing the Yvelines. In 2011 the two rappers were reconciled and performed the song "Vécu" seen over 16 million times on YouTube. In May 2011, La Fouine invited Kamelancien to his concert at the Zenith in Paris to officially end their clash.

=== With Booba ===
Attacked by Booba, during the promotion of his album Futur according to him La Fouine "clashed" him on "Paname Boss" with a punchline. While his album had been released quite a few months, Booba insisted on releasing the song "AC Milan", where he attacked La Fouine calling him a pedophile, calling Emile Louis Laounizi (referring to Emile Louis) and diffusing an extract of a video where the criminal record of La Fouine is revealed.

La Fouine chose "Autopsie 5" to answer back (Autopsie is the name of mixtapes series of Booba). He chose to offer free the song explaining he did not want to make money on the clash. Thereafter, La Fouine and Booba released at the same time a second song "TLT" ("Tuez Les Tous" for Booba and "T'as La Tremblotte" for La Fouine) on their respective YouTube channels. La Fouine spoke mostly about Booba's photo that had circulated on the Internet, in parodying his music.

On 10 March 2013, Booba broadcast the video of their altercation that took place in Miami. American rapper 50 Cent put the video on his website. La Fouine replied "LOL! I just learned that the uncensored version of the altercation with b2obeatrice runs on the Net, I'll wait to find it to put the video of the altercation between him, Dixon (a friend of La Fouine) and Booba on Facebook. He highlighted passages that had been edited out by Booba where he runs away to escape La Fouine and Dixon. They nicknamed him Usain B2olt referring to Jamaican sprinter Usain Bolt.

La Fouine released further disses towards Booba on songs like "Fête Des Meres", where he spoke on Booba's ex protégé Kaaris being absent at his concert in Zenith. He then released "Aubameyang" where he mocked Booba getting attacked by Dam16.

== Banlieue Sale ==
Banlieue Sale
- Parent company: Independent label
- Founded: 2008
- Founder: La Fouine and Canardo
- Genre: Hip hop, rap
- Country of origin: France

In 2008, La Fouine and his brother Canardo decided to launch their own label called "Banlieue Sale". This independent label, forged a partnership with Sony-BMG, one of the biggest music labels in the world. Banlieue Sale has subsidiaries that are "S-Kal Records" (created by the managers of La Fouine) and "Henijai Music" (created by Canardo).

In sum, a half-dozen artists have signed on Banlieue Sale including:

- Green
- MLC
- Chabodo
- M.A.S
- Evaanz
- Fababy
- Sindy

== Personal life ==
La Fouine, born to Moroccan parents, has six siblings, including his brother and fellow rapper Hakim, better known by his stage name Canardo. Speaking at Mawazine in Rabat, he said "I am proud to be Moroccan; I have never forgotten my origins, even though I was born in a foreign country."

Between the ages of 16 and 21, he served four separate prison sentences for theft, burglary, and drug trafficking, until "rap saved his life." He chose the nickname La Fouine (the weasel) in reference to his slim figure and his involvement in petty crime as a young man.

In 2002, he married Fiona, a Franco-Malian woman from Trappes. The couple welcomed a daughter, Fatima, born on May 31, 2003, whom he named after his late mother. They later divorced.

La Fouine is an advocate for Islam and a practicing Muslim. La Fouine is a fan of amateur club ESA Linas-Montlhéry.

== Discography ==
- Bourré au Son (2005)
- Aller-Retour (2007)
- Mes Repères (2009)
- La Fouine vs Laouni (2011)
- Drôle de Parcours (2013)
- Nouveau Monde (2016)
- CDCC (2017)
- Sombre (2018)
- Bénédictions (2020)
- XXI (2021)
- Capitale du Crime Radio (2024)
- État des Lieux (2025)

== Awards and nominations ==
=== MTV Europe Music Awards ===
| Year | Nominee / work | Award | Result |
|---|---|---|---|
| 2011 | La Fouine | Best French Artist | Won |

=== Victoires de la musique ===
| Year | Nominee / work | Award | Result |
|---|---|---|---|
| 2010 | La Fouine | The band or artist revelation of the public of the year | Nominated |
| 2010 | Mes repères | The urban music album of the year | Nominated |
| 2012 | La Fouine vs Laouni | The rap or urban music album of the year | Nominated |

=== L'année du Hip hop ===
| Year | Nominee / work | Award | Result |
|---|---|---|---|
| 2008 | La Fouine | Best Rap Artist | Nominated |
| 2008 | Aller retour | Best | Nominated |
| 2008 | Reste en chien | Best track | Nominated |

=== Trace Urban Music Awards ===
| Year | Nominee / work | Award | Result |
|---|---|---|---|
| 2013 | La Fouine | Best Male Artist | Won |
| 2013 | La Fouine/Zaho | Best Collaboration | Won |
| 2013 | Drôle de Parcours | Best Album | Won |

== Filmography ==
- 2009: District 13: Ultimatum directed by Patrick Alessandrin: Ali K
- 2012: Un marrocain à Paris: Bickette
- 2012: Rouleur de Journaux of Sebastien Rougemont: Ludo
- 2012: Appearance in the French serie SODA
- 2012: Said (short film): Said
- 2013: Ride or Die (short film)
- 2014: A toute epreuve
- 2015: The New Adventures of Aladdin: The Deceitful
- 2017: Alibi.com: Himself
- 2018: Dans l'ombre du tueur (TV mini series): Jeff
- 2019: Night Walk directed by Aziz Tazi: Ayman

=== Web series ===
| Year | Title | Director | Episodes |
|---|---|---|---|
| 2009 | Lourd de fou | Mazava Prod | 1. 69 la trik! - 2. Qui peut me tester...à PES – 3. Ca fait mal! - 4. Montpellier le fait mieux! - 5. Un trappiste à Miami – 6. Le 78 chez les ch'tis – 7. Sam a pris des bords – 8. La promo a Paris c'est magique – 9. Fouiny Potter en Suisse |
| 2011 | Fouiny Story I | Double N Prod | 1. Un F'tor presque parfait – 2. 4 jours en 1 – 3. À la bien – 4. Chanter le foot – 5. Semi-liberté – 6. L'Ancienne Belgique – 7. La cité de l'or – 8. Trappes et Campton – 9. Je suis musulman comme Michael Chretien – 10. African Dream – 11. Nouvelle-Calédonie – 12. Passe-leur le Salam – 13. Kinshasa – 14. En mode clip – 15. Papa – 16. Le printemps des Bourges – 17. D'ou l'on vient – 18. Le Zenith de Paris – 19. Festival Inc'Rock – 20. Banlieue Sale à Cannes – 21. Enjaillement Total – 22. Fouiny Tour – 23. Le retour du roi Heenok – 24. Nancy – 25. M.A.S nouvelle signature Banlieue Sale – 26. Best-of season 1 + unedited materials from season 1 |
| 2011 | Fouiny Story II | Double N Prod | 1. Bienvenue chez la Banlieue Sale – 2. Fababy nouvelle signature Banlieue Sale – 3. La Réconciliation – 4. 3 concerts en 2 jours – 5. Montreality – 6. Banlieue Sale et G-Unit – 7. Dougie Swagg – 8. 3 clips en une semaine – 9. Un concert sous la pluie – 10. Fouiny Tour Part. I – 11. L'association CEKEDUBONHEUR – 12. Fouiny Tour Part. II – 13. Africa Tour 1 – 14. Africa Tour 2 – 15. Africa Tour 3 |
| 2012 | Fouiny Story III | Double N Prod | 1. Dakar 4 ever – 2. Drôle de personage – 3. Paname boss – 4. Fouiny Team – 5. Journée chargée de fou – 6. Drôle de Parcours – 7. Disque d'or – 8. Les Coulisses du C.D.C 3 Tour (part 1) – 9. Les Coulisses du C.D.C 3 Tour (part 2) – 10. Les Coulisses du C.D.C 3 Tour (part 3) – 11. Abidjan – 12. Street Swagg Tour |
| 2016 | Fouiny Story IV | Orson Swell | 1. 6e round 2. Retour aux sources 3. Fouiny Ibrahimovic |
| 2017 | La Fouiny Minute | La Fouine | 1. Johnny 2. Litron 3. RS4 4. Fouiny Dance 5. Remise des trophées YouTube |

== Bibliography ==
- La Fouine: Drôle de Parcours (book published in November 2013)
