= Jacky Brown =

Brazilian singer and presenter

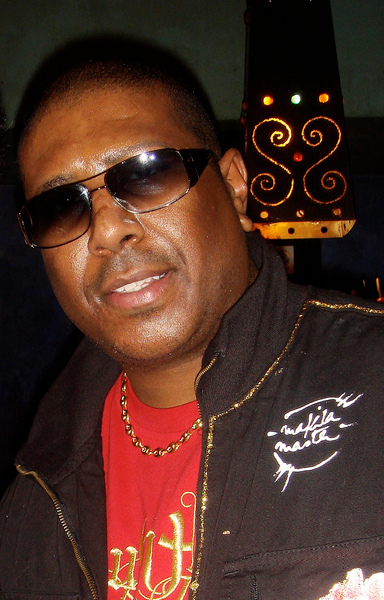
- Jacky Brown

Background information
- Born: Jacky Teixeira; 17 August 1975 (age 50)
- Genres: French Rap
- Occupations: Rapper, presenter
- Years active: 1995–present

Jacky Teixeira (born 17 August 1975), known as Jacky Brown, is a French rapper, singer and presenter of the band Nèg' Marrons, of Cape Verdean origin. He is a member of the group La MC-Mal Criado with Stomy Bugsy, JP and Izo. He was also a presenter at the French cable network Trace TV, and aired "T.E.P.O.K." and on Skyrock with the program "Couvre feu".

He not only sung songs in French and partly in English, he also sung songs in Cape Verdean Creole with the group Nég Marrons.

== Discography ==
=== Group albums ===
==== Nèg' Marrons ====
1997	Rue Case Nègres	1. Lève-toi, bats-toi 2. La monnaie 3. A.N.P.E. (travailler, c'est trop dur); 4. Compétition; 5. Que vont-ils devenir ?; 6. Trop longtemps 7. Ménage à 4; 8. Dawa; 9. La virée 10. 20 ans 11. Rue Case Nègres; 12. Tel une bombe with Ministère A.M.E.R, Hamed Daye, Doc Gynéco & Ärsenik
2000	Le Bilan	1. Le Bilan - 4:25; 2. Personne - 4:55; 3. Ragga Salsa (feat. Mc Janik) - 3:45; 4. Ça dégénère - 4:10; 5. Un nouveau souffle - 4:38; 6. Les Enfants du soleil - 4:45; 7. On fait les choses en 2.0.0.0. (Feat. Pit Baccardi; Rohff; Mystik) - 5:21; 8. Quitter son pays - 5:08; 9. Têtes brûlées - 4:17; 10. Front Line - 4:30; 11. J'ai dit oui - 4:06; 12. Levez les mains bien haut - 4:08; 13. Fiers d'être Nèg' Marrons - 3:56; 14. Faut K'ça Saigne (feat. Sat & Menzo) - 4:25
2003	Héritage	1. Tout le monde debout - 3:37; 2. La voix du peuple - 4:23; 3. Donne toi les moyens - 4:57; 4. Dis moi si j'te saoule - 4:43; 5. Produit de son environnement - 5:16; 6. Vie meilleure - 4:48; 7. Danse hall phenomen - 3:39; 8. Mots qu'il faut - 4:12; 9. Héritage - 5:21; 10. Pourquoi tant de violence - 4:04; 11. Pyromane - 3:41; 12. Ma musique ma destinée - 4:09; 13. Juste pour toi - 4:36; 14. Interlude - 0:49; 15. Hymne - 4:00; 16. Dead (with Pit Baccardi & Arsenik) - 4:32
2008	Les Liens Sacrés	1. Le chant du ghetto 2. Il y a des jours 3. Jeux de jambes with Big Ali; 4. C'est pas normal 5. Petites îles with Cesária Évora; 6. L'union avec Admiral T 7. Quand on vit la nuit 8. Faut qu'on s'en sorte with Gen Renard; 9. L'encre du bitume with Mr. Toma; 10. A nos yeux 11. A peu de choses près 12. Nouvelle époque with Noyau dur 13. On fout le feu 14. Histoire 2 cœurs 15. La musique est un cri with Faya. D.; 16. N'y pense même pas with Lady Sweety [Bonus track]; 17. Et alors with Scalo, Idsa, Fabio, Coco-CC, Joe Popo et Boolk
2015	Valeurs Sûres

==== Mc Malcriado ====
- Nos pobréza ke nos rikéza (2006)
- Fidjus di kriolu (2010)

==== Noyau Dur ====
2005	ND	1. Presentation; 2. Reconciliation; 3. Departements; 4. On ne sera jamais pareil 5. Instinct de survie 6. Attitude; 7. Tout est permis 8. L'histoire continue (feat. Mc Janik); 9. Mode guerre 10. Besoin d'ennemis 11. OP; 12. Partis de rien 13. Professionnels; 14. Le son des loups (feat.[Dontcha, K.ommando Toxic, Dosseh & Kkalibur); 15. Dead

=== Solo albums ===
- Jacky Brown and Family vol.1 by DJ Lord Issa & DJ Poska (2005)
- Nos Probéza ké Nos Rikéza (2007)
- Fidju di Kriolu (2011)

=== Other recordings and collaborations ===
1997

- Passi feat. Jacky & J-Mi Sissoko 79 à 99 on the album Les Tentations by Passi

1998

- Doc Gynéco feat. A.Speak, Pit Baccardi, Lino and Jacky: Menuet - Album Les liaisons dangereuses by Doc Gyneco

1999

- Compilation Garges-Sarcelles Ligne D
- Album Mixomatose by Gang Show lapin
- Album Sanction by Quartier Latin Académia

2000

- Album Les Combinaisons by Janik MC

2001

- Album Double Nationalité by Izé MC
- Album Manuscrits by Manu Key
- Compilation Nouvelle Donne 2
- Album Demain c’est Maintenant by Futurisitq

2002

- Single Gladiator 2002
- Compilation Cap Sol with La Mc Malcriado
- Album Le Poids des Maux by Pit Baccardi

2003

- Album Mobilizé by Izé MC
- Album 4e Round by Stomy Bugsy
- Compilation Fat Taf
- Compilation Dis L'heure 2 Zouk with La Mc Malcriado
- Compilation California Love by DJ Cream
- Compilation Four West Indies by Fabolous Prod

2004

- Album Numéro D’écrou by Alibi Montana
- Compilation Dis L’heure 2 Zouk
- Album On ne Vit Qu’une Fois by Singuila

2005

- Single Senegal Fast Food under the title La Triste Réalité by Amadou et Mariam
- Compilation Rap Attentat 3
- Compilation Neochrom 3
- Album Sorti de Nulle Part by Avo K Jims
- Album Dans Ma Bulle by Diam's
- Album Sombre Lumière by Larsen
- Album Sael & Friends by Sael
- Album Hors Série Vol.1 by Chrnonik 2H
- Compilation Savoir & Vivre Ensemble by Kery James
- Compilation Nuskool, La Relève R&B Vol.1 with N'Dee

2005

- Album Street Show by Heckel et Geckel
- Album Le Jour G by John Gali
- Album Jusqu'au Bout du Tunnel by Mic Fury
- Album La Créme du Crime by Shone (Ghetto Fabulous Gang)
- Compilation Talents fâchés 3
- Album État Brut by Dontcha

2007

- Album Discrimination Positive by Ghetto Diplomats
- Album Évolution by Passi
- Compilation Coupé décalé mania
- Compilation Latina fever volume 2 with La Mc Malcriado & Cubanito 20.02
- Album J'arrive by Dragon Davy

2008

- Compilation Original Bombattah 2
- Album Selim S by Selim S

2009

- EP Bientôt dans les Bacs vol.2 by Shaicho Black
- Album Au Clair Du Bitume by El Matador
- Album Um Flor Especial by Celia with La Mc Malcriado
- Compilation Passion Zouk 2009 with La Mc Malcriado
- Compilation Val D'oise Thugz by Rma2n
- Compilation Paris Oran New York by DJ Kayz
- Compilation Puissance Rap spécial rap français 2009
- Compilation Fat Taf 2
- Compilation Casa Aberta

2010

- Compilation Photo 2 Famille
- Compilation Lights Out All Stars with La Mc Malcriado
- Album Dieu Bénisse Les Voyous by Scalo

2012

- La Voix Du Peuple (Voice of the People) feat Jacky Brown : single: La Parole Est A Nous de La Voix Du Peuple

== Filmography ==
- Couvre Feu (Cover Fire), Skyrock, 1996-2006
- T'entends pas ou Koi (Trace TV)
