= Assia (singer) =

French singer

- Born: Assia Maouene; November 1, 1973 (age 52); Algeria
- Genres: R&B; soul
- Occupation: Singer
- Instrument: Vocals
- Years active: 1998–present
- Label: Virgin France

Assia (born November 1, 1973) is an Algerian-born French singer with Kabyle origins. She had great success with her hit singles "Elle est à toi" and "Là-bas".

== Biography ==
At a young age, she spent twelve years at the classical conservatory in Créteil (near Paris), then a few years later obtained a law degree.

From 1998 to 1999, Assia participated in "Une Affaire de famille" with Stomy Bugsy, Passi and Doc Gynéco of the Sector A and the soundtracks of the movies Taxi and Kiss of the Dragon with the song "Ghir Dini".

In 2000, she released her first album entitled Chercheuse d'or (recorded in Paris, Toulouse and Los Angeles). Assia wrote the texts and his brother Khalil signed the music. Her first top single "Elle est à toi" (over 700,000 copies) was written in collaboration with Calbo of Arsenik. The second single is "Là-bas" (music video directed by J.G. Biggs).

In 2002, Assia played in the musical Cindy with Lââm in the lead role.

In 2003, she released a single with Beenie Man, "Street Life".

In 2005, Assia released her second album, Encore et Encore, recorded in Spain, whose second single "Politiquement Correct" was co-written with Diam's.

== Discography ==
=== Albums ===
Year	Title	Chart			Certification (FR)
Year	Title	FR	BEL (WA)	SWI	Certification (FR)
2000	Chercheuse d'or	47	—	—	Gold
2005	Encore et Encore	80	—	—	—

=== Singles ===
Year	Title	Chart			Certification (FR)
Year	Title	FR	BEL (WA)	SWI	Certification (FR)
1999	"Mauvais garçon" ^{1}	50	—	—	—
2000	"Elle est à toi"	3	2	—	Platinum
2001	"Là-bas"	13	21	—	Silver
2001	"Ghir dini"	63	—	—	—
2001	"Quelques Mots en ton nom" ^{2}	35	—	—	—
2002	"5,9,1" ^{3}	15	39	—	—
2003	"Street Life" ^{4}	41	—	—	—
2003	"Si c'était à refaire"	50	—	66	—

^{1} Duet with Doc Gyneco
^{2} Duet with Julien Clerc
^{3} Duet with Rohff
^{4} Duet with Beenie Man
