= Mohamed Dia =

Franco-Malian fashion designer (born 1973)

- Born: August 5, 1973 (age 52); Sarcelles, France
- Occupation: Fashion designer
- Known for: M.Dia brand

Mohamed Dia (born 5 August 1973 in the Sarcelles) is a Franco-Malian designer of sport clothing (sportswear and streetwear) and founder of the M.Dia brand.

In 1999, he founded M.Dia, a new brand of sport clothing with his own savings in Sarcelles, in the outskirts of Paris. French popular rap groups such as Secteur Ä or Ministère AMER supported him and spread his brand wearing his products. That attracted the attention of French mass media which soon depicted him as a role model for youngsters from impoverished neighborhoods.

In 2001, he signed a license with NBA and created a new textile collection: NBA by DIA. That allowed him to enter the American market and then to open his first shop in the United States in 2004.

In 2005, he also created his own record label, Dia entertainment, along with hip hop group Ärsenik.

He now owns a French sports clothing brand with a 16-million-euro revenue (nearly 24 million dollars) as of 2007.
