= Izé Teixeira =

- Born: 21 February 1974 (age 52); Praia, Portuguese Cape Verde
- Occupation: Singer

Izé Teixeira or Izé (Praia, 21 February 1974) is a singer currently living in France.

== Biography ==
Izé Teixeira was born in island of Santiago. During his childhood or his teenage years, he immigrated to France and lived in the Paris Metropolitan Area.

His first release was a maxi in 2000 titled Ma volonté. He later released Double Nationalidade (2001), which was his first studio album, Mobilizé (2003), and Kunana Spirit. Izé Teixeira released his fourth album Urb/Africa in February 2011, featuring Capeverdean music and colorful melodies. Izé was one of the members of La MC Malcriado band, a collection of Cape Verdean singers that included Stomy Bugsy, Jacky Brown, as well as others like Neg'Marrons and JP in two fingers.

== Nominations ==
Izé received two nominations alongside the group MC Malcriado. "Dis l'Heure 2 Zouk" was nominated at the Victoires de la musique (Music of the Winners) 2004 in the category Best Reggae/Ragga Album of the Year and a trophy for Best Group of the African Diaspora at the 2010 Kora Awards.

== Discography ==
=== Mazi ===
- Ma volonté (2000)

=== Solo albums ===
- Double Nationalité (2001)
- Mobilizé (2003)
- Kunana Spirit (2007)
- Urb'Africa (2011)

=== with La MC Malcriado ===
- "Nos Pobreza Ké Nos Rikeza" (2006)
- "Fidju di kriolu" (2011)

=== Features and compilations ===
- Le calibre qu’il te faut, (1996), album by Stomy Bugsy
- Cap Sol (2002)
- 4ème Round (2003), album by Stomy Bugsy
- Dis l'heure 2 Zouk (2003)
- Autour du Monde Cap-Vert (2006) - compilation
- Cabo Dream (Vol.1) (2006) - compilation
- Latina Fever /vol.2 (2007) - compilation
- African Fever (2008) - compilation
- Un geste pour Haïti (2010)
- Yes we can songs about leaving africa (2010) - compilation for the 2010 World Cup
- Revolucion Karibeana (2010), album by Victor O
- En (2010), reggae dancehall style
- Sound of secousse vol.1 (2010)
