= Secteur Ä =

French hip-hop collective

Secteur Ä was a 1990s French rap association based in Sarcelles, France and named after a sector in the region. This music collective was created by the Ministère AMER, and artist Kenzy became its producer-manager.

The association was made up of artists mainly coming from Val-d'Oise region (Garges-lès-Gonesse, Sarcelles and Villiers-le-Bel). It was composed of the rappers Passi, Stomy Bugsy, Doc Gynéco, Ärsenik (Lino & Calbo), Nèg' Marrons (Jacky, Ben J and Djamatik), Hamed Daye, MC Janik and La Clinique. In 1998, they found great success with a series of gigs including a major appearance at Paris Olympia on 22–23 May 1998 on the 150th anniversary of the abolition of slavery. In 1999, Pit Baccardi, a rapper from 19th arrondissement of Paris joined in.

== Noyau Dur ==
After the departure of a number of the best known artists from Secteur Ä like Passi, Stomy Bugsy and Doc Gynéco, the remaining artists reformed the rap association group as Noyau Dur in 2000. The new formation included Pit Baccardi, Jacky (from Nèg' Marrons), Ben-J and Ärsenik. Newer adherents included Futuristiq (made of Qrono & Nubi), Fdy Phenomen and R'n'B singer Singuila. The entity Secteur Ä was consequently liquidated.
