= Aliker =

Aliker is a French surname. Notable people with the surname include:

- André Aliker (1894−1934), Martinican columnist and journalist
- Martin Aliker, Ugandan dental surgeon and businessman
- Pierre Aliker (1906−2013), French Martinican politician, physician, and independence activist
