= Doc Gynéco =

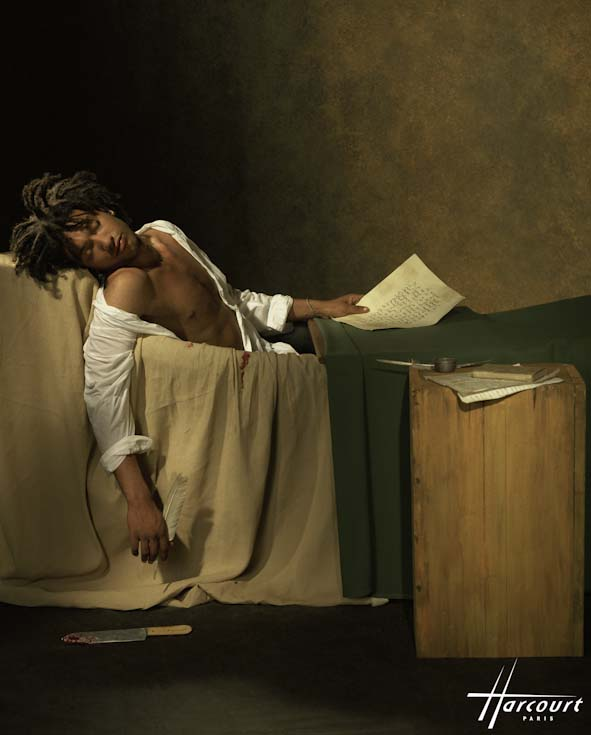
- Doc Gynéco in 1997. The photo by Studio Harcourt alludes to the 1793 painting The Death of Marat

Background information
- Also known as: Doc, Gynéco, Brunodoc
- Born: Bruno Beausir; Clichy-sous-Bois, Seine-Saint-Denis, France
- Genres: French hip-hop; G-funk; soul; reggae; zouk
- Occupations: Rapper; singer; record producer
- Instrument: Vocals
- Years active: 1994–present
- Labels: Virgin / Parlophone (1994-2004); Exclaim / Archambault (2005-2008); Warner / Mercury (since 2016)

Bruno Beausir (French pronunciation: [bʁyno bosiʁ]), known by his stage name Doc Gynéco (pronounced [dɔk ʒineko]), is a French hip hop musician. His music is typically characterized as a ragga/rap style, that has found its fan base in France.

== Early life, family and education ==
Born in Clichy-sous-Bois, France, Beausir's mother was of Guadeloupean origin and his father white. In 1990, he moved with his family to Paris, to Porte de la Chapelle, a district to which he would often pay homage in his songs.

== Career ==
Doc Gynéco launched his career at age 19, writing a few tracks for the hardcore rap group Ministère AMER. After this rap group parted, Virgin Records signed him with the intent of converting his demos into an album in Paris. This project partially fell through; Doc Gynéco then traveled to Los Angeles to work with American producer Ken Kessie. The result of this work would be Première Consultation, released in April 1996, which received large media praise and huge success both in France and the world. Singles from the album include "Est-ce que ça le fait?", "Viens voir le docteur", "Dans Ma Rue", "Passements de Jambes", and "Né Ici". In France, the album will sell more than 1 million copies.

Two years later, on 1 December 1998, his second album, Liaisons Dangereuses, was released. Although the main single "C'est Beau La Vie" was a flop, the album still sold reasonably well. Later in a radio interview, Doc Gyneco admitted that he regretted the collaboration he had with politician Bernard Tapie, saying «Je vous le répète, parfois je me goure» ("I'm telling again, sometimes I slip up") .

In the spring of 2001, Doc Gynéco's third album Quality Street was released. Guest stars on the album included the Wu-Tang Clan and Gregory Isaac. The album's first single, "Caramel", met little success, although it was also included on Putamayo Grooves, a compilation album.

Doc Gynéco's fourth album Solitaire was released in August 2002. It proved to be popular. Doc Gynéco received the "Victoires de la Musique" award for Best Hip-hop/Rap Album of the Year. Singles included "Funky Maxime", "Frotti Frotta", and "Flash".

'Menu Best-of', a collection of his hit singles since the beginning of his career was released in 2004. During 2006 the album Homme Nature was released.

After a musical break, he made a comeback in 2016 with a re-release of his first album, Première consultation, to celebrate the 20th anniversary of the album's release. In 2018, he released his seventh solo album, 1.000%.

== Style ==
After the release of his first album, his sexual and provocative lyrics provoked discussion and criticism. However, the album sold 800,000 copies and Doc Gynéco became part of the popularising rap movement of the 1990s. His music, a mix of ragga and rap, addresses controversial subjects like drugs, sex, women, racism, and poverty. For example, one of his biggest hit at the time was “Nirvana,” a pessimistic song in which he promotes the use of drugs: “Je veux me droguer aux aspirines façon Marilyn” (‘I wanna pop pills like Marilyn’). In this song he explains how damaged life is in our society and how it pushes him to use drugs and, eventually to commit suicide: “Je veux atteindre le Nirvana” (‘I want to reach Nirvana”).

Like "Nirvana", a lot of his songs are very nostalgic and refer to poverty and the poor living conditions in French social housing estates. The reason for this is that he had actually lived in the such estates since birth. His song "Né ici" ('Born here') expresses the perceived lack of social mobility among those living in the projects . He says: “Ma mère est née là-bas, mon père est né là-bas, moi je suis né ici dans la misère et les cris” ('My mom was born over there, my dad was born over there [in the Caribbean] but I was born here [in a Parisian housing estate] amidst all the poverty and pain'). Hence, one principal role for his work is to underline the issues of contemporary society.

Like many French rap artists, his works caused controversy; he was criticized for demeaning the status of women. Not all critics characterized him that way, though; one wrote, "Unjustly attacked for misogyny, he is in fact capable of encapsulating complex poetic emotion into the crude language of a ghetto love song such as 'Ma Salope a Moi' - 'My Slut'." He has also been criticized for promoting drug use, and dealing with other sensitive subjects (such as suicide in his song "Nirvana"). He stands apart, however, for rarely promoting violence in his works, something that had become a trademark for rap artists in France.

He was part of a movement that popularized rap in the 1990s, along with groups such as IAM or Suprême NTM and took it to every home. His laid-back attitude, his style, as well as his appreciation, knowledge and involvement with popular or controversial subjects like football, sex or drugs all strongly contributed to his fame, particularly among France's adolescent population. Riding his popularity, his appearance in French television shows became regular, particularly at the start of the new century, using his appearance and style as a catalyst.

Even though he appears as a womaniser, he does not promote violence in his videos. He disapproves of the acts of violence that occur in the projects. He says that the young people in the projects should not express themselves through violence because it will not improve their situation.

== Politics ==
Unlike many French rappers, Beausir's politics are conservative, and he is close to politician Nicolas Sarkozy, showing him his support during his presidential campaign. Despite claiming in 2001 to be close to the Socialist Party, in 2006 he joined the Union for a Popular Movement and announced his support for Sarkozy in a party meeting in Marseille.

Other rappers have denounced Gynéco as a traitor, not least since his current politics contrast against an earlier stage in his career when he was critical of the French state: “Je kiffe quand les keufs cannent (I get a kick when cops croak it);” “France is a country of cops. There are a hundred on every street corner. To keep order, they get away with murder.” His support of Sarkozy has been controversial: Stomy Bugsy no longer considers Beausir a friend partly because of it, and Beausir was booed off a stage in Geneva in August 2007.

== Discography ==
=== Solo albums ===
- Première Consultation (1996)
- Liaisons Dangereuses (1998)
- Quality Street (2001)
- Solitaire (2002)
- Un Homme Nature / Doc Gynéco Enregistre Au Quartier (2006)
- Peace Maker (2008)
- 1.000% (2018)

=== Compilations ===
- Menu Best Of (2003)
- Le Doc au pays (2006)
- Première consultation (20th anniversary edition) (2016)

=== Common albums ===
- Secteur Ä Live À L'Olympia (1998) - With Secteur Ä
- Double Pénétration (2001, Cancelled) - With Stomy Bugsy

=== News, featurings and appearances on compilations ===
- 1994

Ministère A.M.E.R. Feat Doc Gynéco - Autopsie, on the album "95200" of Ministère A.M.E.R.

- 1995

Les Rita Mitsouko Feat Doc Gyneco - Riche on the live album "Les Rita Mitsouko - Acoustiques" of Rita Mitsouko
Doc Gynéco & La Clinique, Passi et Djamatik - Clic Clic (La Clinique) on Viens Voir Le Docteur Vinyle

- 1997

Neg'Marrons Feat Ministère AMER, Doc Gynéco, Hamed Daye & Ärsenik - Tel Une Bombe sur l'album des Neg'Marrons, "Rue Case Nègres"
La Clinique Feat Les Sales Gosses - Tout Saigne sur la compilation "Hostile Vol.1"
Doc Gynéco Feat MC Janik - Né Rue Case Nègres sur le maxi de Doc Gynéco, "Né Ici"
Doc Gynéco Feat Ärsenik - Arrête De Mentir sur le maxi de Doc Gynéco, "Né Ici"
Julien Clerc Feat Doc Gyneco & Tonton David - Mélissa reprise live sur l'album "Julien Clerc en Concert, Le 4 octobre"

- 1998

Ärsenik Feat Doc Gyneco - Affaire de Famille sur l'album d'Ärsenik, "Quelques Gouttes Suffisent"
Doc Gyneco Feat Laurent Voulzy & Yannick Noah - Né Ici reprise live sur la compilation des Enfoirés, "Les Enfoirés en Cœur"
Stomy Bugsy Feat Doc Gyneco - Oye Sapapaya sur l'album de Stomy Bugsy, "Quelques Balles de Plus pour le Calibre Qu'il Te Faut"

- 1999

Djamatik Feat Doc Gynéco - Laisse Moi Chanter sur l'album "Djamatik Connexion"
Pit Baccardi Feat Doc Gyneco - On Lachera Pas L'Affaire sur l'album éponyme de "Pit Baccardi"
Doc Gynéco & Assia - Mauvais Garçon sur la compilation "Indigo - Version R&B"

- 2001

RZA Feat Doc Gyneco & Cilvaringz - Cousin' (version d'origine, différente de celle sur Quality Street) sur l'album de RZA as Bobby Digital, "Digital Bullet"

- 2002

Doc Gyneco - Fais Ce Que Tu Veux sur la B.O. du film Le Boulet
Doc Gyneco Feat Stomy Bugsy - BugsDoc 18 sur la mixtape "Explicit Dix-Huit"
Doc Gyneco - C'est Non ! (diffusé gratuitement sur le site internet officiel de Doc Gynéco entre les deux tours des élections présidentielles)
Lord Kossity Feat Doc Gyneco - Gunshot sur l'album de Lord Kossity, "Koss City"

- 2003

Doc Gyneco Feat Jeff Joseph - Du Spy Dans L'air sur la B.O. du film Taxi 3
Laurent Voulzy Feat Doc Gynéco - Radio Pfff sur l'album Sol En Cirque
Doc Gyneco - Taxi enregistré pour la B.O. du film Taxi 3, mais disponible sur la compilation de Doc Gynéco Menu Best Of.
Doc Gynéco - Trop Belle au naturel. Morceau inédit paru sur la compilation de Doc Gynéco Menu Best Of
Doc Gynéco Feat Stomy Bugsy & MC Janik - Big Up. Morceau inédit paru sur la compilation de Doc Gynéco Menu Best Of

- 2004

Doc Gynéco Feat Dimidonkya & Mamido - La Vérité sur la compilation "Dis L'Heure 2 Ragga"
Ministère A.M.E.R. Feat Doc Gynéco & Hamed Daye - Le Colis (diffusé gratuitement sur le site internet officiel de Hamed Daye)
Ministère A.M.E.R. Feat Doc Gynéco & Hamed Daye - Plan B sur la mixtape de DJ Noise, "Los Angeles Most Wanted Vol.1"

- 2006

Johnny Hallyday Feat Ministère A.M.E.R. & Doc Gynéco - Le Temps Passe sur l'album de Johnny Hallyday, "Ma vérité"

- 2007

Doc Gynéco Feat Matinda - La Vie est un Rêve sur le CD accompagnant le livre "Les grands esprits se rencontrent"
Doc Gynéco - A Chaque Guerre sa Paix sur le CD accompagnant le livre "Les grands esprits se rencontrent"
Doc Gynéco Feat MC Janik & Boulet du groupe 2 Doigts - On ne chante pas pour du fric sur le CD accompagnant le livre "Les grands esprits se rencontrent"
