= Chercheuse d'or =

Chercheuse d’or

Studio album by Assia
- Released: 23 May 2000
- Recorded: 1998–2000
- Genre: R&B
- Length: 55:49
- Label: Virgin France
- Producers: DJ Sample; Ken Kessie; Khalil; Djimi Finger

Assia chronology
Chercheuse d’or (2000)	Encore et encore (2005)

Singles from Chercheuse d’or
- 1. "Elle est à toi" Released: 2000; 2. "Là-bas" Released: 2000; 3. "Ghir dini" Released: 2001

Chercheuse d’or (meaning Gold Digger) is the debut album by Algerian-born French singer Assia. It was released in France on 23 May 2000, through Virgin France. Chercheuse d'or is a R&B album and incorporates elements of funk, soul and raï styles. Three singles are released from the album. It includes her first hit "Elle est à toi", "Là-bas" and "Ghir dini". It peaked at number 47 on the French charts, selling 200,000 copies.

== Background ==
In 1995, Assia began her career as a songwriter. After released "Ghir Dini" from the soundtrack of the French film Taxi produced by IAM, she signed in Virgin France in 1999. In 2000, Chercheuse d'or becomes a national success, especially with her hit single "Elle est à toi".

== Critical reception ==
Chercheuse d'or was met with mixed reviews from music critics, many of whom criticized the French-Arabic singing. Patrick Labesse of Le Monde tries to find an explanation for this French-Arabic mix in the article Du choix de chanter en arabe et en français. Assia continue to explain her album Chercheuse d'or is about the search for happiness : "I seek what everyone seeks, happiness! And then of course the love, not only that of a man but the universal love". When Chercheuse d'or was released, Assia thus analyzes the reception of the album in France : "Sometimes I was told that my songs sounded too Arabic, sometimes they said that I lacked exoticism. That's the reason why I'm going my own way today".

== Track listing ==
No.	Title	Writer(s)	Producer(s)	Length
1.	"Ghir dini"	Assia	Khalil	3:59
2.	"Elle est à toi"	Calbo	Assia, Djimi Finger	4:36
3.	"La nuit sera longue"	Assia	Assia, Khalil	4:04
4.	"Là-bas"	Calbo	Assia, Khalil	4:06
5.	"Fini"	Assia, Khalil	Khalil	4:27
6.	"Nos destinées"	Assia	Khalil	4:43
7.	"Chercheuse d'or"	Assia	Khalil	4:49
8.	"L'Homme de mes rêves"	Calbo	Assia, Djimi Finger	4:04
9.	"Quand les anges pleurent" (featuring Hamed Daye)	Assia, Hamed Daye	David Chevalier, Khalil	4:27
10.	"Laissez-nous rêver"	Assia	Khalil	4:34
11.	"Wine"	Assia	Assia, DJ Sample	4:07
12.	"Va"	Assia	Assia, Nico Nocchi	4:04
13.	"Le Nomade des coeurs"	Assia	Khalil	3:35
Total length:				55:49

== Personnel ==
Credits adapted from the liner notes of Chercheuse d'or.

- Assia – composer, primary artist, vocals
- Bernard Benant – photography
- Hamed Daye – composer, performer, primary artist
- Julien Delfaud – mixing assistant
- Jean-François Delort – mixing assistant
- Xavier Derouin – acoustic guitar
- Mustapha Ettamri – percussion
- Djimi Finger – programming
- Pablo Gil – artwork, logo
- Jean-Paul Gonnod – assistant engineer
- Christophe Guiot – violone
- Catherine Juste – assistant engineer
- Ken Kessie – drum programming, engineer, realization
- Peter Maunu – acoustic guitar
- Marlon Mclain – guitar
- Tim Pierce – electric guitar
- Mickaël Rangeard – engineer
- Stéphane Reichart – engineer
- Patrick Shevelin – drum programming
- Travis Smith – engineer
- Philipp Weiss – engineer, mixing

== Charts ==
Chart (2000)	Peak position	Certification (FR)
France (SNEP)	47	Gold
