= Bisso Na Bisso =

Congolese-French music collective

Bisso na Bisso
- Origin: Paris, Congo, France
- Genres: hip hop, rumba, Zouk, Soukous
- Members: Passi; Ben-J; Lino; Calbo; D.O.C. TMC; G Kill; Mystik; M'Passi

Bisso Na Bisso (Lingala: Between Us) is a music collective originating from the Republic of the Congo. The group was formed in 1999 and consists of rappers and singers, including Ben-J, a member of Les Neg'Marrons; the duo Lino and Calbo from Ärsenik; Doc and G Kill, renowned members of 2Bal; Mystik; and the only female rapper, M'Passi. The group was put together by the French rapper Passi.

The group released their debut studio album, Racines, which means "Roots" in French. The album fuses hip-hop with African and French West Indies rhythms and sounds, such as Congolese rumba, zouk, and soukous, giving it a unique and distinctive flavor. It included guest appearances by Koffi Olomide, Papa Wemba, Ismaël Lô, Kassav, Lokua Kanza, Tanya Saint-Val, 3615 Niaou, Roldán González Rivero, and Monique Seka. Racines was a commercial success, selling over 180,000 copies and becoming one of the best-selling hip-hop albums of 1999 in France. It was certified gold twice and won three Kora Awards for Best Arrangement, Best Group, and Best Video for "Bisso Na Bisso". Racines is widely regarded as the first French rap album created by Africans living or born in France. The album's single "Bisso Na Bisso" became an anthem for young people who "discovered a group of artists with a fresh breath and tracing a new era of French hip-hop, less distant than that which came from the United States." The group performed at the Zénith de Paris on May 15, 1999, with guests such as Koffi Olomidé, Lokua Kanza, Tanya Saint-Val, and Ismaël Lô.

Their second studio album, titled Africa, was released in 2009, blending hip-hop with Congolese rumba, the rhythms of West Africa, the Antilles, Jamaica, and North Africa. It featured guest appearances by Manu Dibango, Cheb Khaled, Angélique Kidjo, Papa Wemba, Sizzla, Mayra Andrade, Jocelyne Labylle, Christophe Maé, Billy Dikossa's, Bengani Fassie, Chaba Fadela, Cheb Houcine, Guy Waku, Ishmael Morabe, Ismaël Lô, Jacob Desvarieux, Jérome Prister, Les Choeurs Zulu De Soweto, Les Nubians, Meiway, Queen Etémé, and Zola 7.

Many French rappers such as those that comprise the group Bisso Na Bisso, describe their desire to both foster solidarity among Blacks and demonstrate their pride in Africa, while simultaneously acknowledging their roots in an urban French context. This identity struggle represented in French rap music is further complicated by the fact that black African rappers in France struggle to create a presence in the film industry and on television where French black Africans receive little exposure and being white opens doors to many more opportunities. Rappers report their feelings of disconnect from both their homelands and from their present homes where they are unable to adequately use the media to portray the inequality in French society.

The group is credited with paving the way for musical fusions that would give birth to the 21st-century Afro trap, initiated by MHD and popularized through his eponymous debut studio album, MHD, in 2016.

Bisso Na Bisso have spent much energy providing humanitarian aid to the Congo and other African countries, including while they are touring. In addition to their humanitarian aide, they have been vocal in their criticism of Africa politics. In "Dans la peau d'un chef," they criticize the corruption of the government with lines like 'I pray for the development of my country that is falling into decay/believe me I swear to gorge myself...'

== Members ==
Much of the group's music entails collaboration with many celebrated artists within the genres of Congolese rumba, ndombolo and soukous. These artists include, but are not limit to, Papa Wemba, Lokua Kanza, and Koffi Olomidé. Other collaborations include Franklin Boukaka (1940–1972), a Congolese artist. These collaborations reach deep into the heritage of African descent and call upon a new style that incorporates the French culture with its African roots.

The group members includes:

- DOC TMC (Landry Mahoukou) 2 Ball 'Niggets (member of the collective Ménage à 3 and ex-2 Ball 2 Neg) until his imprisonment in 1999 (sentenced until 2014, he was released in January 2006)
- G-Kill (Frederic Mahoukou) 2 Ball 'Niggets (member of the collective Ménage à 3 and ex-2 Ball 2 Neg)
- Lino (Gaëlino M'Bani), Ärsenik
- Calbo (Calboni M'Bani), Ärsenik
- Ben-J (Fabien Loubayi), Neg' Marrons
- Mystik (Gyslain Loussingui)
- M'Passi, Melgroove (cousin of Passi)
- Passi Balende

== Discography ==
=== Albums ===
- 1999: Racines
- 2009: Africa

=== Popular music videos ===
- 1999: "Bisso Na Bisso"
- 1999: "Dans la peau d'un chef"
- 1999: "Tata N’zambé"
- 2009: "Show ce soir" (directed by JG Biggs)
- 2009: "Là bas"
