= Ministère AMER =

French hip-hop music group

Ministère Ä.M.E.R.
- Also known as: Le Ministère; Le Stermini; M.Ä.
- Origin: Sarcelles, Val-d'Oise, France
- Genres: Hip hop
- Years active: 1990–present
- Past members: Passi; Stomy Bugsy

The Ministère AMER (Action, Musique Et Rap) is a French hip hop group from Sarcelles, consisting of the rappers Passi and Stomy Bugsy (both of whom are also major solo artists in the French hip hop scene), DJ Ghetch, and the producer/manager Kenzy. The group is also associated with other major French hip hop artists such as Doc Gyneco and Hamed Daye. The group's name means 'ministry of action, music and rap'. Also 'amer' means 'bitter'.

Their first single, Traîtres, was released in 1991, and it was followed by the album Pourquoi tant de haine in 1991. The second album, 95200, came out in 1994. In 1995, after their song Sacrifice de poulet, which appeared on the disc La Haine inspired by the film of the same name, provoked the French Minister of the Interior, Charles Pasqua, to attack the group in court. The court's ruling forced the group to pay 250,000 francs of fines, but Mr Pasqua's demands for banning sales of Ministère AMER's discs were unsuccessful. However, radio stations were reluctant to play their music after this incident, and the only station who continued to do so was Generation 88.2, an underground parisian station dedicated to hip hop music.

Members of the band began to pursue solo careers after the release of their second album, and Stomy Bugsy released his first solo album Le calibre qu'il te faut in 1997. Passi also released Les tentations the same year. After the success these albums enjoyed, Kenzy created the record label Secteur Ä to accommodate Ministère AMER and other hip hop artists, such as Nèg' Marrons, Ärsenik, Doc Gynéco, Hamed Daye, and Tandem.

In 1997, the group's two albums were re-released as a limited edition double album. Since then, they were inactive for a long time, but regrouped in 2005 for the compilation Illicit projet.

== Discography ==
Studio Albums :

- 1992: Pourquoi tant de haine
- 1994: 95200

Compilations :

- 1997: L'Intégrale
