= Hôtel de Ville, Sarcelles =

Town hall in Sarcelles, France

Hôtel de Ville
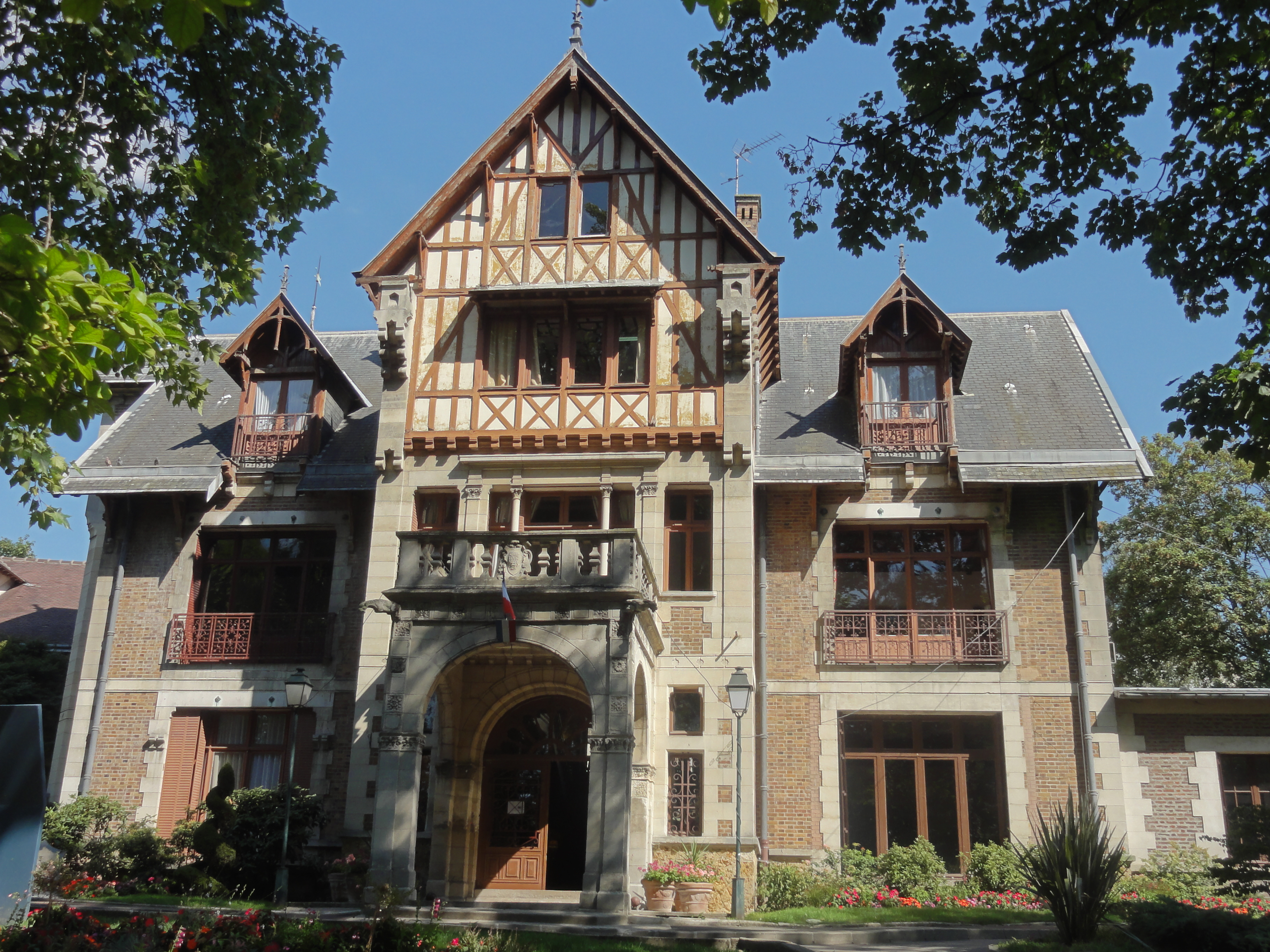
- The main frontage of the Hôtel de Ville in September 2015

General information
- Type: City hall
- Architectural style: Renaissance Revival style
- Location: Sarcelles, France
- Coordinates: 48.9974°N 2.3783°E
- Completed: 1885

Design and construction
- Architect: Paul Boeswillwald

Monument historique
- Official name: Ancien manoir de Miraville, actuelle mairie
- Type: Inscrit
- Designated: 2011
- Reference no.: PA95000018

The Hôtel de Ville (French pronunciation: [otɛl də vil], City Hall) is a municipal building in Sarcelles, Val-d'Oise in the northern suburbs of Paris, standing on Rue de la Résistance. It was designated a monument historique by the French government in 2011.

== History ==
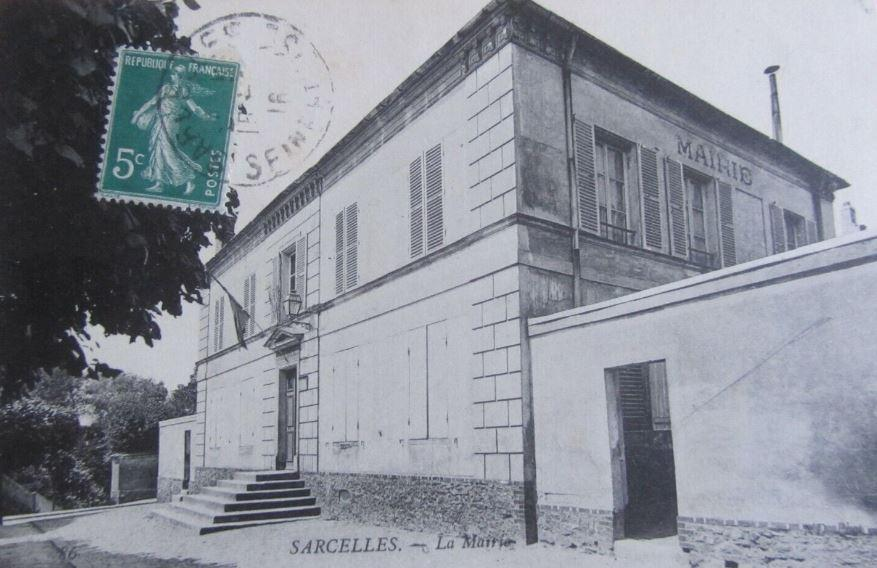
The old town hall

The first town hall in Sarcelles was erected on the site of an old cemetery just to the southwest of the Church of Saint Peter and Saint Paul on what was the Place de la Mairie (now Place de la Libération). The building was designed in the neoclassical style, built in ashlar stone and was completed in the 19th century. The design involved a symmetrical main frontage of five bays facing southwest onto the Place de la Mairie. The central bay featured a short flight of steps leading up to a doorway with a moulded surround and triangular pediment. The building was fenestrated by casement windows with shutters on both floors. A white stone monument, intended to commemorate the life of Marius Galvani, a medical doctor who tended to the community during the cholera pandemic in 1892 and who served as a member of the council, was erected in front of the old town hall in 1938.

In the early 1960s, there was a significant increase in population, largely associated with the repatriation of French people from Algeria. Annexes to the town hall were established within the new housing estates, but increasingly Sarcelles became a town of two separate communities, one for the old rural community, and one for the new urban community. In this context the town council decided to acquire a more substantial building to provide municipal services to both communities.

The building they selected was the old Manor of Miraville which had been erected on the site of the Château de Richebourg which was burnt down by Huguenots in 1567. The manor house was commissioned by a lace merchant, Frédéric Aylé, and benefited from a large estate known as Miraville Park. It was designed by Paul Boeswillwald in the Renaissance Revival style, built in brick with half-timber dressings, and was completed in 1885. The design involved a symmetrical main frontage of three bays facing west towards Miraville Park. The central bay, which was slightly projected forward, featured a porte-cochère supporting a balcony; there was a tri-partite window flanked by pilasters supporting a cornice on the first floor, and a half-timbered gable above. The outer bays contained French doors on the ground floor, casement windows on the first floor, and dormer windows at attic level. Internally, there was a grand staircase and some of the windows were originally decorated with fine stained glass dating from the 16th century. Aylé's son, Frédéric-Henri Aylé, sold the house to a hotelier, René Massiaux, in 1942. After the Second World War, a plaque to commemorate the lives of local people who had died in the service of the French Forces of the Interior was installed in Miraville Park. The manor house served as a hotel until the town council acquired both the manor house and Miraville Park in 1964. A Salle du Conseil et des Mariages (council chamber and wedding room) was subsequently established in the building.

The building went on to serve as the office of several prominent mayors including Dominique Strauss-Kahn from 1995 and François Pupponi from 1997.
