= Canton of Sarcelles =

Administrative division of the Val-d'Oise department

Coordinates: 48.99°N 2.38°E

The canton of Sarcelles is an administrative division of the Val-d'Oise department, Île-de-France region, northern France. It was created at the French canton reorganisation which came into effect in March 2015. Its seat is in Sarcelles.

It consists of the following communes:

1. Sarcelles
