= Jonathan Tokplé =

French-born Togolese footballer (born 1986)

Personal information
- Date of birth: 29 July 1986 (age 40)
- Place of birth: Sarcelles, France
- Height: 1.75 m (5 ft 9 in)
- Position: Defender

Youth career
- 1999–2002: INF Clairefontaine

Senior career*
Years	Team	Apps	(Gls)
2003–2006	Paris Saint-Germain B	24	(2)
2006–2007	Le Mans B	32	(0)
2007–2009	Balma SC	33	(0)
2009–2011	Villemomble Sports	51	(0)
2011–2012	Vierzon		
2012–2014	FC Fleury 91		
2015	Auch Football	8	(0)

International career
2006–2009	Togo	2	(0)
- * Club domestic league appearances and goals

Jonathan Tokplé (born 29 July 1986) is a former professional footballer who played as a defender. Born in France, he made two FIFA-official appearances for the Togo national team, in 2006 and 2009.

== Club career ==
Tokplé was born in Sarcelles, France. He was on trial at K.S.K. Beveren in summer 2007. He played in a reserve team game for English Conference National club York City in October, which York drew 0–0 with Hull City.

== International career ==
Tokplé was invited to represent Togo. He was capped three times by Togo from 2006 to 2009.
