= Le Boulet =

- Directed by: Alain Berbérian
- Produced by: Jacques-Eric Strauss; Fabienne Tsaï; Jean-Louis Monthieux
- Starring: Gérard Lanvin; Benoît Poelvoorde; José Garcia; Djimon Hounsou
- Cinematography: Jean-Pierre Sauvaire
- Edited by: Philippe Bourgueil
- Music by: Robert Basarte; François Forestier; Krishna Levy; Jean-Louis Viale
- Production companies: Warner Bros. Productions Limited; La Petite Reine; France 2 Cinéma; France 3 Cinéma
- Distributed by: Warner Bros. Pictures
- Release date: 10 April 2002
- Running time: 107 minutes
- Country: France
- Language: French
- Budget: $28.5 million
- Box office: $16.8 million

Le Boulet is a French action-comedy film directed by Alain Berbérian and Frédéric Forestier, released in 2002.

== Plot ==
Moltès, a killer in prison, plays the lottery every week and sends the tickets with Reggio, a guard, so that the latter's wife, Pauline, can have them validated. One day the ticket is a winner, but Pauline is at a car rally in Africa, unknowingly carrying the ticket with her. Moltès wanting to recover his due, escapes and forces Reggio (the guard) to accompany him. However, he becomes the target of his nemesis, another gangster nicknamed "The Turk" (whose brother was killed by Moltès), and his bodyguard named Requin, a giant with teeth of steel.

== Cast ==
- Gérard Lanvin as Gérard Moltès
- Benoît Poelvoorde as Francis Reggio
- José Garcia as Mustapha Amel, a.k.a. "The Turk"
- Djimon Hounsou as Detective Youssouf
- Rossy de Palma as Pauline Reggio
- Jean Benguigui as Saddam, the store keeper
- Gary Tiplady as Requin The Giant
- Gérard Darmon as Kowalski
- Stomy Bugsy as Malian guy #1
- Marco Prince as Malian guy #2
- Omar Sy as Malian guy #3
- Nicolas Anelka as Himself
- Nicolas Koretzky as Jean Monthieux
- Jamel Debbouze as Desert Prison Guard

== Production ==
Shooting took place in Paris and North Africa.

There are numerous cameo appearances; Nicolas Anelka appears as a football player, Jamel Debbouze as a prison guard in Mali, and musicians Stomy Bugsy (former Ministère AMER) and Marco Prince (singer of the FFF) and comedian Omar Sy (the duo Omar et Fred) as killer brothers. The man who reads a newspaper with Moltès' photo on the back is Jean-Marc Deschamps, the production manager. The scriptwriter and producer Thomas Langmann made a small cameo in the role of the Turk's brother. The Turk's bodyguard (played by Gary Tiplady) is a reference to the notorious hitman known as "Jaws" played by Richard Kiel in the James Bond films The Spy Who Loved Me (1977) and Moonraker (1979).
