= Calbo (rapper) =

French-Congolese rapper (1972–2026)

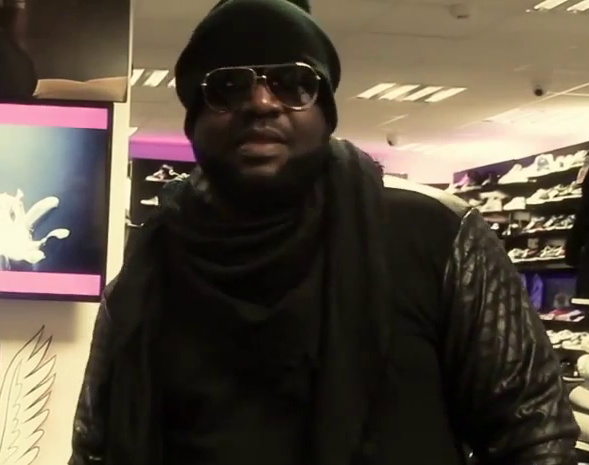

Background information
- Born: Calboni M'Bani; December 24, 1972; Brazzaville, Republic of the Congo
- Died: January 4, 2026 (aged 53) Lyon, France
- Genre: Hip-hop
- Occupation: Rapper
- Years active: 1992–2026
- Formerly of: Ärsenik

Calboni M'Bani (22 September 1972 – 4 January 2026), better known by his stage name Calbo, was a French-Congolese rapper. He was a member of the French rap duo Ärsenik with his brother Gaëlino M'Bani known as Lino in the duo. He also had a solo output, independent of Ärsenik, iconic duo from the golden age of French rap.

Born to parents from Congo-Brazzaville, Calbony M'Bani, known as Calvo, and his brother Gaëlino M'Ban, known as Lino, lived through the 1990s in a hip-hop culture that was primarily dance-based and still perceived as deeply American.

== Early life ==
Calbo was born on 22 September 1972, in Brazzaville (Congo). From a family of Congolese-Brazzaville origin, he grew up in the Paris region, where he discovered hip-hop culture and began writing his first lyrics.

== Career ==
Ärsenik started as a band in mid 1990s. Until 1997, the group also included Tony Truand, a cousin. In 1998, now a duo, Ärsenik released their first album Quelques gouttes suffisent went double gold. In 2007 the group released a disc titled S'il en reste quelque chose which included the most popular songs from the two brothers, such as "L'enfer remonte à la surface", "Rime & chatiments" and "Sexe, pouvoir & biftons".

In the late 1990s, Calbo and his brother Lino teamed up with a group of rappers who were also second-generation Africans, on a collaborative project called Bisso Na Bisso, an expression which means "just between ourselves" in Lingala, the most commonly spoken language in the Congo region. Part of this group were Ben-J (from Les Neg'Marrons), Passi (from Ministère A.M.E.R.), twin brothers Doc and G Kill (from 2Bal), and Mystik and his female cousin M'Passi. The group embarked on a collective return to their African roots, featuring music with an innovative fusion of styles, that mixed modern hip-hop and zouk sounds with traditional Congolese rumba.

In 2003, Lynnsha's song "Trop de peine" featuring Calbo on vocals.

In 2011, Calbo announced his first solo album, under the name Look at the World.

In 2012, he released his solo album titled 6ème Chaudron and in June 2013, he released his solo single "C'est là-bas" on Trèfle record label accompanied by a music video. It featured another fellow Congolese artist known as VR.

Alongside his work with Ärsenik, Calbo participates in several collective projects, notably Bisso Na Bisso, which brings together French artists of African origin and aims to blend rap and sounds from African music.

Committed to cultural transmission, Calbo has invested himself throughout his career in artistic mediation activities, notably through the facilitation of writing and musical creation workshops for young people, in partnership with local authorities and cultural structures.

During the campaign of the Europe Ecology The Greens candidate Yannick Jadot for the 2022 French presidential election, Calbo and his duo Arsenik with Lino, supported him by performing for an opening concert of a meeting.

In 2022, Calbo released a solo album, "Quelques gouttes de plus".

== Death ==
Calbo died on 4 January 2026, at the age of 52.

== Discography ==
=== Albums ===
in duo Ärsenik

See discography of Ärsenik

Solo

Year	Single	Charts
Year	Single	FR
2012	6ème Chaudron	–

=== Singles ===
in duo Ärsenik

See discography of Ärsenik

Collaborative singles

Year	Single	Charts
Year	Single	FR
2013	"C'est là-bas" (feat. VR)	–

Collaborative singles

Year	Single	Charts
Year	Single	FR
2003	"Trop de peine" (Lynnsha feat. Calbo)	64
