= Sarcelles =

- Subprefecture and commune
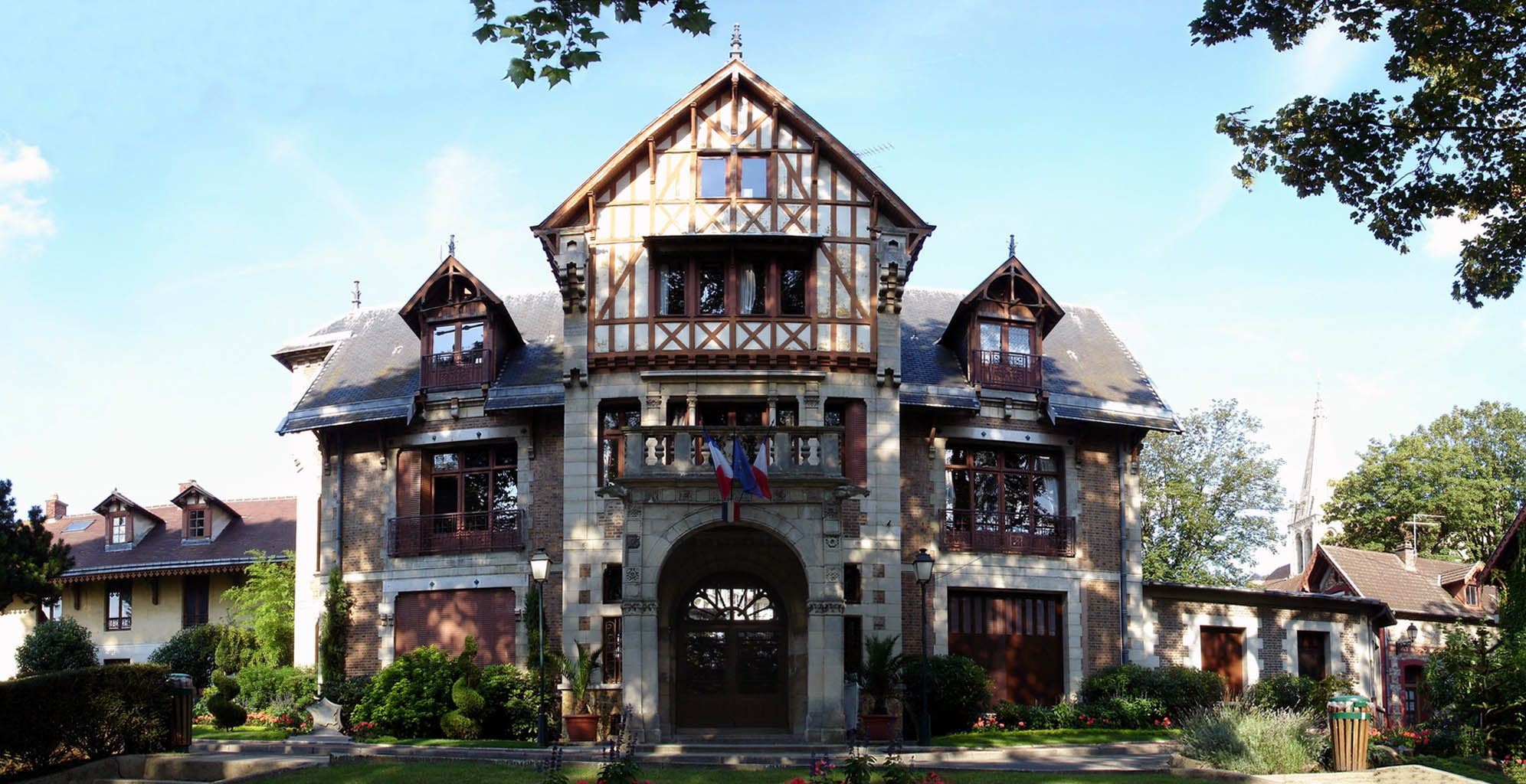
- The Hôtel de Ville

- Coat of arms

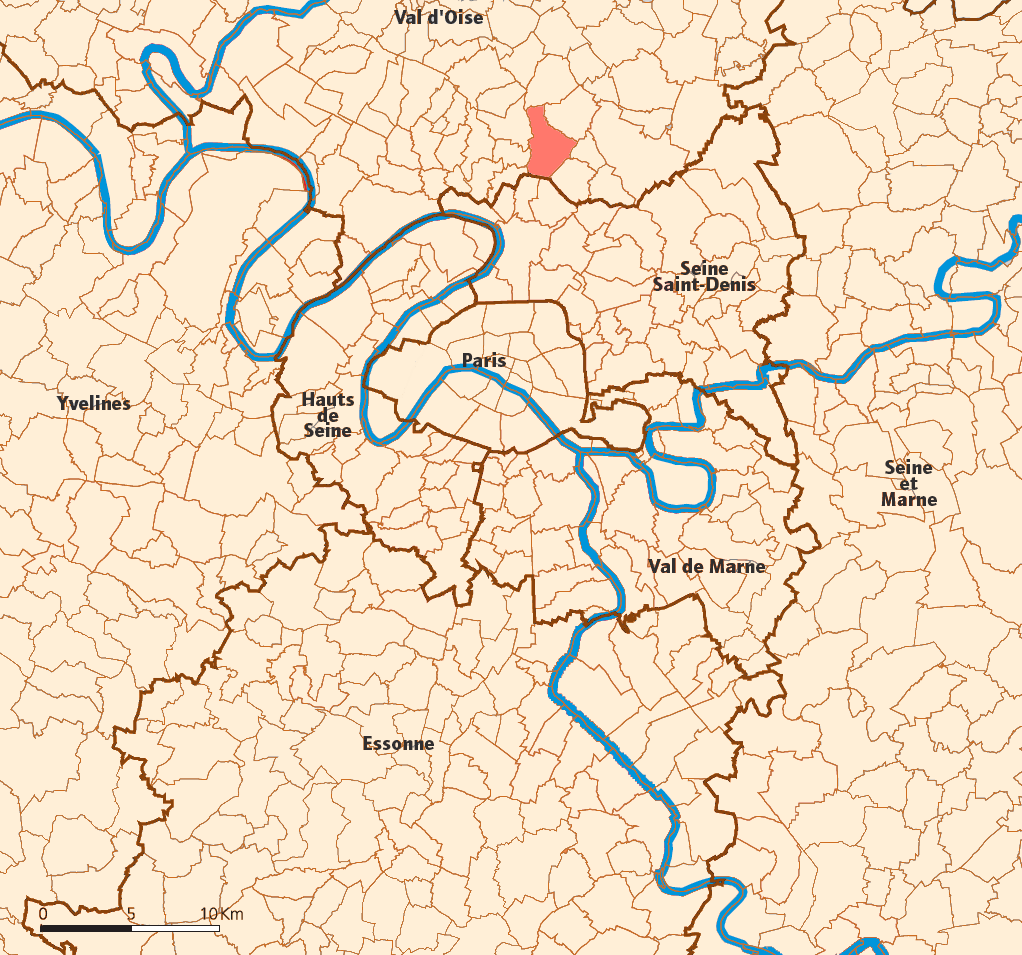
- Location (in red) within Paris inner and outer suburbs
- Location of Sarcelles
- Location within France Location within Île-de-France (region)
- Coordinates: 48°59′44″N 2°22′51″E
- Country: France
- Region: Île-de-France
- Department: Val-d'Oise
- Arrondissement: Sarcelles
- Canton: Sarcelles
- Intercommunality: CA Roissy Pays de France

Government
  - Mayor (2020–2026): Patrick Haddad
- Area^{1}: 8.45 km^{2} (3.26 sq mi)
- Population (2023): 59,173
  - Density: 7,000/km^{2} (18,100/sq mi)
- Time zone: UTC+01:00 (CET)
  - Summer (DST): UTC+02:00 (CEST)
- INSEE/Postal code: 95585 /95200
- ^{1} French Land Register data, which excludes lakes, ponds, glaciers > 1 km^{2} (0.386 sq mi or 247 acres) and river estuaries.

Sarcelles (French pronunciation: [saʁ.sɛl]) is a commune in the northern suburbs of Paris, France. It is located 16.3 km (10.1 mi) from the centre of Paris. Sarcelles is a sub-prefecture of the Val-d'Oise department and the seat of the arrondissement of Sarcelles.

== History ==
In the south of the commune, during the 1950s and 1960s, vast housing estates were built in order to accommodate pieds-noirs (French settlers from Algeria) and Jews who had left Algeria due to its war of independence. A few Jews from Egypt settled there after the Suez Crisis, and Jews from Tunisia and Morocco settled in Sarcelles after unrest and riots against Jews due to the Six-Day War and the Yom Kippur War. The Hôtel de Ville was built as a private house and was completed in 1885.

== Transport ==
Sarcelles is served by Garges–Sarcelles station on Paris RER line D.

It is also served by Sarcelles–Saint-Brice station on the Transilien Paris-Nord suburban rail line. This station, although administratively located on the territory of the neighbouring commune of Saint-Brice-sous-Forêt, lies in fact very near the town centre of Sarcelles.

== Population ==
Historical population

| Year | Pop. | ±% p.a. |
|---|---|---|
| 1793 | 1,600 | — |
| 1800 | 1,410 | −1.79% |
| 1806 | 1,588 | +2.00% |
| 1821 | 1,327 | −1.19% |
| 1831 | 1,615 | +1.98% |
| 1836 | 1,609 | −0.07% |
| 1841 | 1,735 | +1.52% |
| 1846 | 1,788 | +0.60% |
| 1851 | 1,622 | −1.93% |
| 1856 | 1,604 | −0.22% |
| 1861 | 1,781 | +2.12% |
| 1866 | 1,846 | +0.72% |
| 1872 | 1,682 | −1.54% |
| 1876 | 1,845 | +2.34% |
| 1881 | 2,001 | +1.64% |
| 1886 | 2,159 | +1.53% |
| 1891 | 2,118 | −0.38% |
| 1896 | 2,199 | +0.75% |
| 1901 | 2,384 | +1.63% |

| Year | Pop. | ±% p.a. |
|---|---|---|
| 1906 | 2,603 | +1.77% |
| 1911 | 2,796 | +1.44% |
| 1921 | 3,364 | +1.87% |
| 1926 | 5,032 | +8.39% |
| 1931 | 6,292 | +4.57% |
| 1936 | 7,083 | +2.40% |
| 1946 | 6,622 | −0.67% |
| 1954 | 8,397 | +3.01% |
| 1962 | 35,800 | +19.87% |
| 1968 | 51,674 | +6.31% |
| 1975 | 55,007 | +0.90% |
| 1982 | 53,630 | −0.36% |
| 1990 | 56,833 | +0.73% |
| 1999 | 57,871 | +0.20% |
| 2007 | 59,594 | +0.37% |
| 2012 | 57,499 | −0.71% |
| 2017 | 58,587 | +0.38% |
| 2023 | 59,173 | +0.17% |

Source: EHESS and INSEE (1968-2023)

=== Immigration ===
A substantial number of inhabitants of the town are pieds-noirs from Northwest Africa who immigrated to France in the 1960s. Sarcelles is also home to a vibrant Jewish community and the largest concentration of Assyrians in France.

Rahsaan Maxwell, author of Ethnic Minority Migrants in Britain and France: Integration Trade-Offs, stated that compared with other French communities, the ethnic minorities in Sarcelles have more influence, so therefore "Sarcelles should not be considered representative of cities across metropolitan France". Residents believe that there is a "Sarcelles identity," meaning any ethnic group can be a part of the city, and they believe it lowers levels of crime and violence.

Compared with other parts of France, ethnic minorities in Sarcelles gained political power at a faster rate, with gains made in the 1980s instead of the 1990s and 2000s. Many politicians responded to minority demands sooner as many immigrants, especially Caribbeans and Sephardic Jews, had French citizenship. François Pupponi, the mayor in the 2000s dedicated monuments commemorating the histories of ethnic groups, authorised funding of organisations supporting specific ethnic groups such as running Arabic and Hindi language classes and permitted the use of public facilities for religious events. Pupponi argued that this style is the best method of giving many ethnic groups one sense of community. Critics argued that funding groups catering to specific ethnic groups promotes segregation.

Place of birth of residents of Sarcelles in 1999
| Born in metropolitan France | Born outside metropolitan France | | | |
|---|---|---|---|---|
| 61.5% | 38.5% | | | |
| 61.5% | Born in overseas France | Born in foreign countries with French citizenship at birth^{1} | EU-15 immigrants^{2} | Non-EU-15 immigrants |
| 61.5% | 5.7% | 5.9% | 2.4% | 24.5% |
^{1} This group is made up largely of former French settlers, such as pieds-noirs in Northwest Africa, followed by former colonial citizens who had French citizenship at birth (such as was often the case for the native elite in French colonies), as well as to a lesser extent foreign-born children of French expatriates. A foreign country is understood as a country not part of France in 1999, so a person born for example in 1950 in Algeria, when Algeria was an integral part of France, is nonetheless listed as a person born in a foreign country in French statistics.^{2} An immigrant is a person born in a foreign country not having French citizenship at birth. An immigrant may have acquired French citizenship since moving to France, but is still considered an immigrant in French statistics. On the other hand, persons born in France with foreign citizenship (the children of immigrants) are not listed as immigrants.

==== Caribbeans ====
As of 2008, 8.7% of the population was of Caribbean origin. As of 2012, many of the ethnic Caribbean residents have French citizenship.

By the 1970s, Afro-Caribbeans became more interested in changing politics. By the 1980s, Guy Guyoubli, a local activist, organised an almost all-Caribbean protest list. Maxwell wrote that this demonstrated that Caribbeans had serious intentions of participating in the political system, even though there were no representatives elected from the lists. At the time, ethnic minorities across Metropolitan France were increasingly trying to influence the political system. The city's first ever two Caribbean councillors were elected in 1989. Around 1989, Raymond Lamontagne, the mayor, opened Metropolitan France's first ever Caribbean-orientated, council-funded community centre.

==== Maghrebian Muslims ====
In the 1950s and 1960s, Maghrebians began to arrive in Sarcelles. They developed political organisation in subsequent decades. Originally, the Muslims worshipped in converted makeshift areas, but, later, they built mosques for their community.

In the 1990s, Maghrebians were first elected to the commune council. Maxwell wrote that Maghrebians did not begin to obtain "key positions" until about 2012, as they had had "low turnout and weak community organisations".

==== Assyrian Christians ====
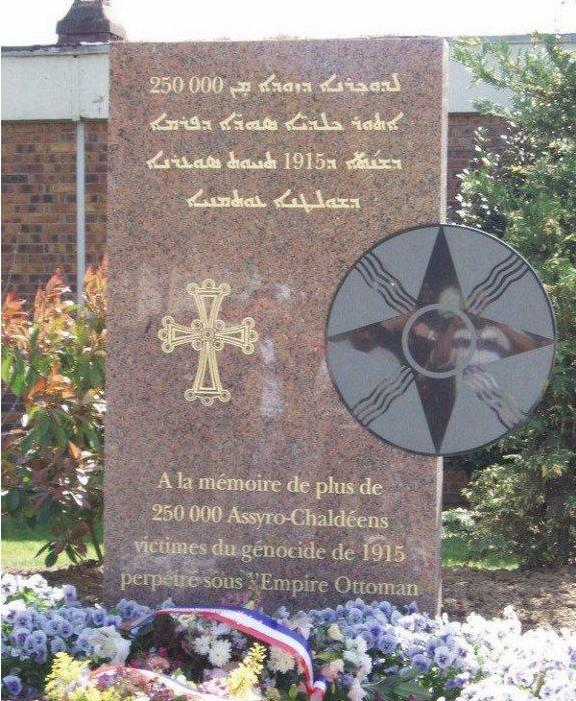
Memorial to the 1915 Assyrian genocide

A memorial to Assyro-Chaldean victims of the 1915 Assyrian genocide was dedicated in 2005. Part of the film The Last Assyrians features the Assyrian community, including members of the Chaldean Catholic Church.

==== Maghrebi Jews ====
During the 1960s, many Maghrebi Jews migrated to France, settling in Sarcelles. They were chiefly from Algeria, Tunisia and Morocco. Today, most of the Jewish residents have French citizenship.

During the peak immigration of Maghrebi Jews, they subscribed to a belief in assimilation and secularism. They had the North African belief of what Michel Wieviorka and Philippe Bataille, authors of The Lure of Anti-Semitism: Hatred of Jews in Present-Day France, describe as "a structuring role" that "does not cover all aspects of social life". Beginning in the 1980s, religion became more public and important. Wieviorka and Bataille stated that the previous North African practice is "becoming mixed up with the neo-Orthodox practices of the 'young people' for whom religion controls everything."

In 1983, a wave of councillors were elected who were Sephardic Jews from North Africa.

== Crime ==
In 2012, Maxwell stated that "petty crime" and vandalism had become consistent issues. He said that "violent confrontations" among black migrants, Maghrebians, and Jews was "a recurring theme". He added that, by 2012, the commune had "developed a reputation as one of the more dangerous Paris suburbs." Maxwell wrote that local residents told him that the reputation was overblown.

Maxwell wrote that, during the 2005 French riots, a report concluded that the damage to buildings in Sarcelles was "relatively moderate". A later report concluded that, compared with most cities, Sarcelles had fewer days of severe riots. He also said that local residents characterised the damage as "not as bad as elsewhere and not as bad as one might have expected given Sarcelles's economic and ethnic profile."

== International relations ==
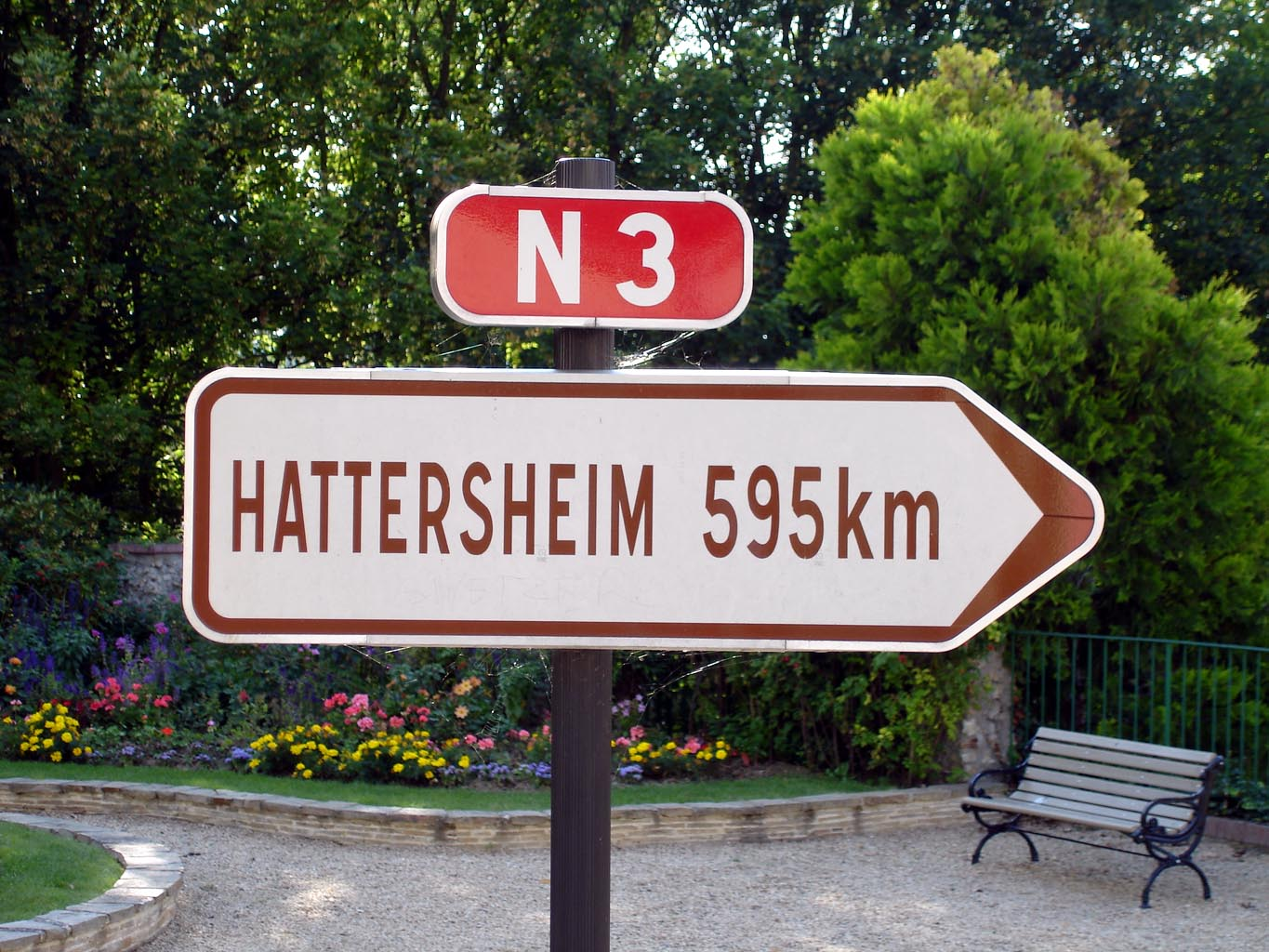
Direction of the nearest twin town

=== Twin towns – sister cities ===
Sarcelles is twinned with:

- Netanya, Israel, since 1988
- Hattersheim, Germany, since 1987

=== Co-operation agreement ===
- (Republic of Artsakh) Martakert, Nagorno-Karabakh Republic, since 2015

== Education ==
The commune has 19 public écoles maternelles (pre-schools/nurseries), 21 public écoles primaires (primary schools), six public collèges (junior high schools), two public lycées (senior high schools/sixth-form colleges), and two other educational institutions.

- Collèges: Chantereine, Anatole-France, Évariste-Galois, Jean-Lurçat, Victor Hugo, and Voltaire
- Lycées: Lycée Polyvalent de La Tourelle and Lycée Polyvalent J.J. Rousseau
- Others: I.U.T (Institut universitaire de technologie), C.I.O (Centre d'information et d'orientation)

The Bibliothèque intercommunale Anna Langfus is located in Sarcelles. This library has over 60,000 items and is divided between an adults' section and a children's section. In addition the Espace Musique Mel Bonis is in Sarcelles.

== Notable people ==
- Jonathan Assous, French-Israeli footballer
- Wissam Ben Yedder, French footballer
- Stomy Bugsy, French rapper and actor
- Damien Cely, French diver
- Sarah-Léonie Cysique, French judoka
- Mohamed Dia, Franco-Malian fashion designer
- Didier Domi, French footballer and coach
- Andy Faustin, French-born Haitian footballer
- Dimitri Foulquier, Guadeloupean footballer
- Amir Haddad, French-Israeli singer-songwriter
- Les Twins, twin French hip-hop dancers
- Riyad Mahrez, Algerian footballer
- Derek Mazou-Sacko, French footballer
- Miss Dominique, French singer
- Éric Sabin, French footballer
- Younousse Sankharé, Senegalese footballer
- Dominique Strauss-Kahn, French economist and politician
- Mathys Tel, French footballer
- Jean-Manuel Thetis, French footballer
- Frédéric Thomas, French footballer
- Jonathan Tokplé, French-born Togolese footballer
- Steeve Yago, French-born Burkinabé footballer

== See also ==
- Ministère AMER
- Passi
- Stomy Bugsy
- Communes of the Val-d'Oise department

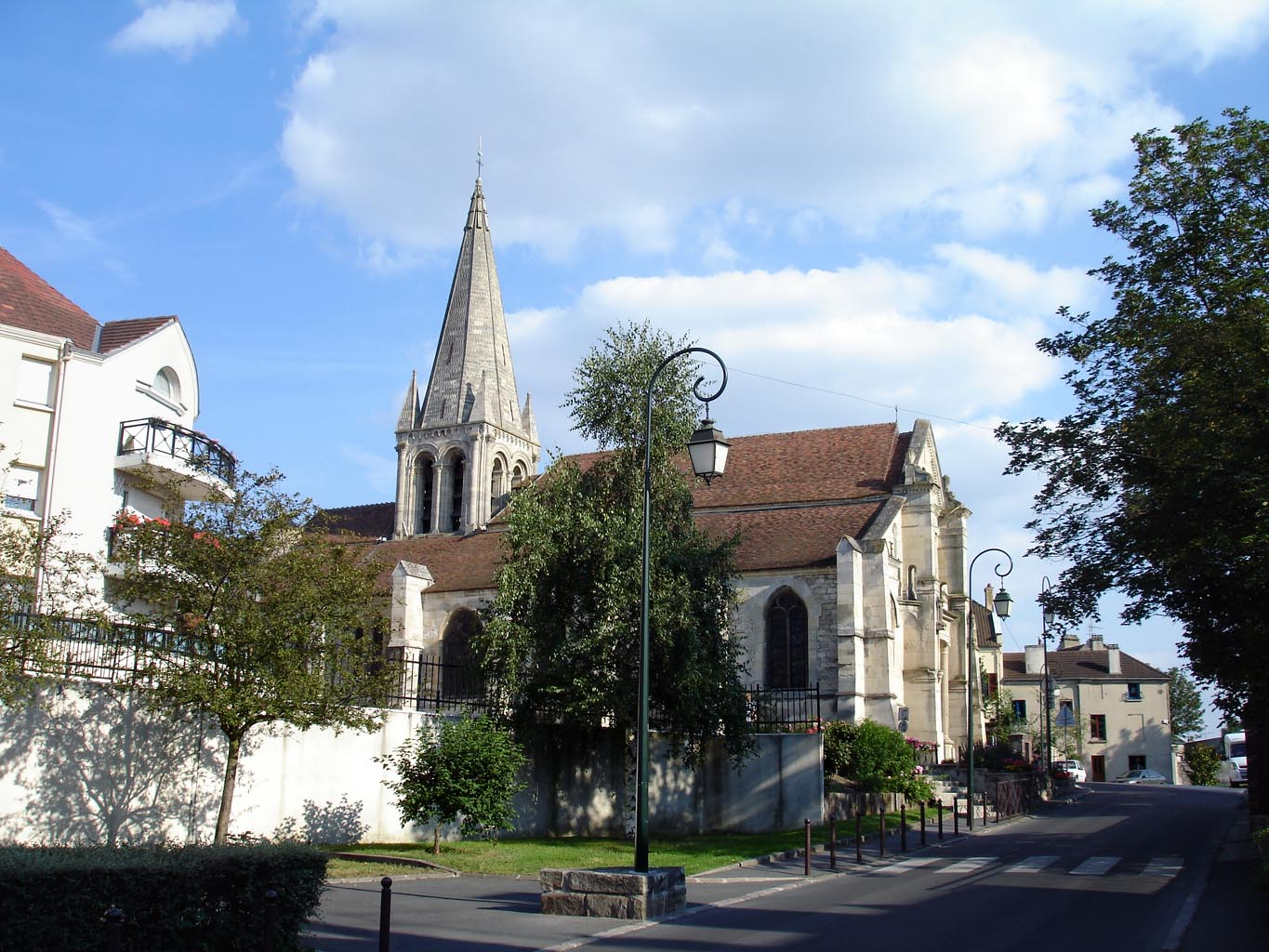
The church, classified as a historic monument
