= André Aliker =

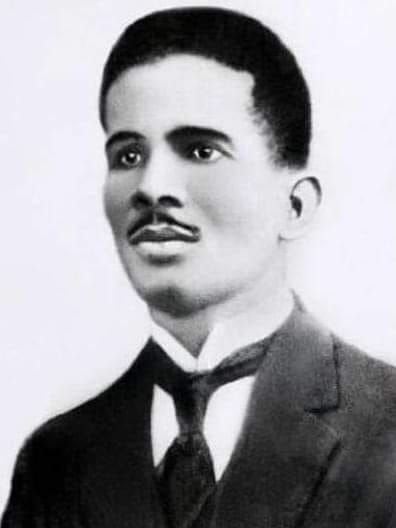
André Aliker

André Aliker (Roches-Carrées, Lamentin, 10 February 1894 - 10, 11 or 12 January 1934) was a militant Martiniquais communist journalist who was abducted and murdered.

Aliker was editor of Justice, the communist newspaper, publishing for example in 1933 accusations that Eugène Aubéry - the wealthy béké owner of the Société Anonyme de Lareinty- had bribed the judges of the Court of Appeal to dismiss charges of tax fraud against his wife in 1929. On 1 January 1934, Aliker was abducted for the first time, beaten and thrown into the sea, but survived. He wrote to his brother Pierre Aliker (doctor and later co-founder of the Parti progressiste martiniquais) that Eugène Aubéry had put a price on his head. Some days later he was again abducted by persons unknown and his body was washed up on the beach with his arms tied behind him on 12 January.
