= Lino (rapper) =

Congolese rapper

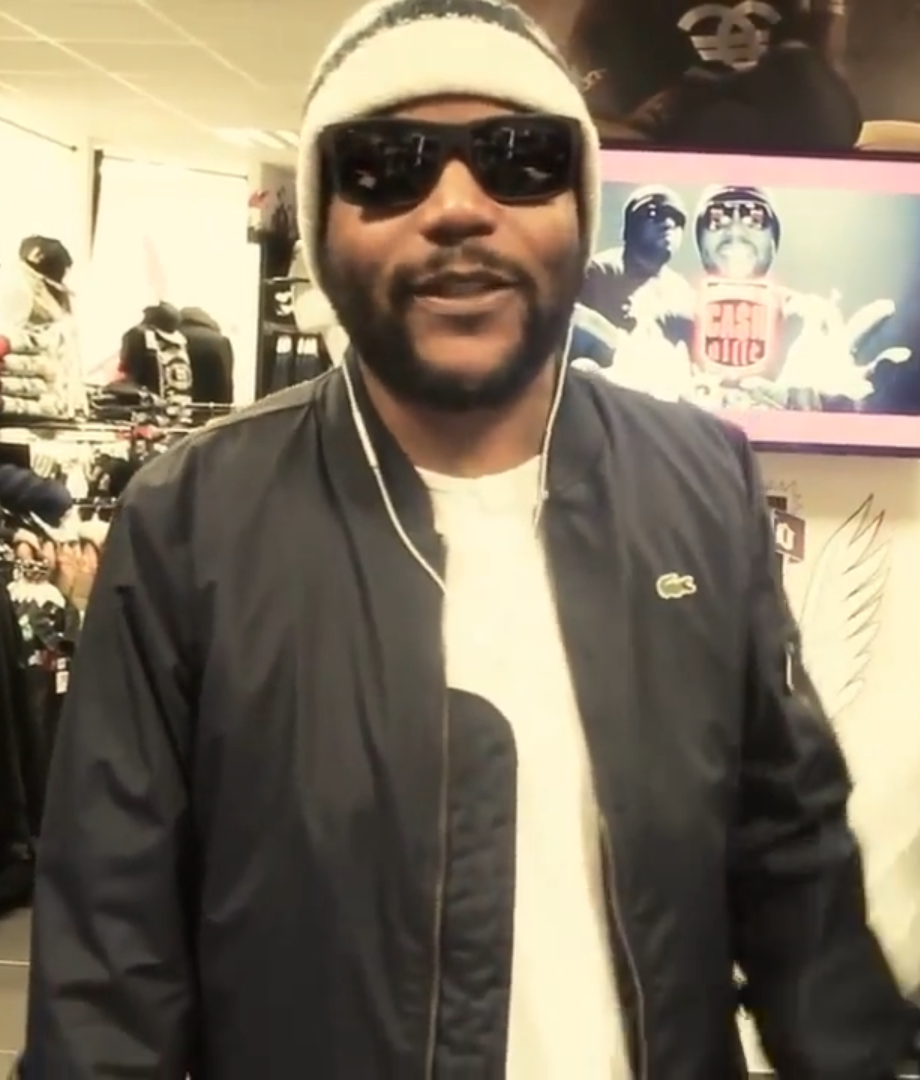
Lino in 2015.

Gaëlino M'Bani, better known by his stage name Lino, is a Congolese rapper. He was a member of the French rap duo Ärsenik with his brother Calboni M'Bani known as Calbo in the duo. He has also his solo output independent of Ärsenik. Lino's family originates from Congo.

== Career ==
Ärsenik started as a band in mid 1990s. Until 1997, the group also included Tony Truand, a cousin. In 1998, now a duo, Ärsenik released their first album Quelques gouttes suffisent went double gold. In 2007 the group released a disc titled S'il en reste quelque chose which included the most popular songs from the two brothers, such as "L'enfer remonte à la surface", "Rime & chatiments" and "Sexe, pouvoir & biftons".

In the late 1990s, Lino and his brother Calbo teamed up with a group of rappers who were also second-generation Africans, on a collaborative project called Bisso Na Bisso, an expression which means "just between ourselves" in Lingala, the most commonly spoken language in the Congo region. Part of this group were Ben-J (from Les Neg'Marrons), Passi (from Ministère A.M.E.R.), twin brothers Doc and G Kill (from 2Bal), and Mystik and his female cousin M'Passi. The group embarked on a collective return to their African roots, featuring music with an innovative fusion of styles, that mixed modern hip-hop and zouk sounds with traditional Congolese rumba.

In 2004, Lino collaborated in a music project launched by Kery James in the single "Relève la tête" credited to "Kery James presents Lino, AP, Diam's, Passi, Matt & Kool Shen". In 2007, he also collaborated with three tracks on rapper Stomy Bugsy album Rimes Passionnelles and in 2009, took part in Bisso Na Bisso's project Africa.

Lino has released two solo albums of his own, Paradis assassiné released in September 2005 which was the title of a solo song on the group's second album. Lino also released Radio Bitume in May 2012. Both have charted in France.

In 2012 he signed with AZ, now part of Universal Music.

== Discography ==
=== Albums ===
in duo Ärsenik

See discography of Ärsenik

Solo

Album Details	Charts		
Album Details	FR	BEL (Wa)	SWI
Paradis assassiné: Released: September 2005; Record label: Hostile Records	17	–	–
Radio Bitume: Released: May 2012; Record label:	120	–	–
Requiem: Released: January 2015; Record label: AZ	2	27	30

=== Singles ===
in Ärsenik

See discography of Ärsenik

Singles

Year	Single	Charts	Album
Year	Single	FR	Album
2004	"Relève la tête" (Kery James presents Lino, AP, Diam's, Passi, Matt & Kool Shen)	39	
2014	"12ème lettre"	99	
2014	"Suicide commercial"	160	
2015	"Choc funèbre"	174	Requiem
2015	"De rêves & de cendres" (feat. Manon (Mutine))	75	Requiem

Featured in

Year	Single	Charts	Album
Year	Single	FR	Album
2015	"Temps mort 2.0" (Booba feat. Lino)	58	Booba album D.U.C
2016	"Musique nègre" (Kery James feat. Lino & Youssoupha)	112	
2017	"Grand Paris" (Médine feat. Lartiste, Lino, Sofiane, Alivor, Seth Gueko, Ninho & Youssoupha)	64	
