= Pierre Aliker =

French Martinican politician

Pierre Aliker (9 February 1907 – 5 December 2013) was a French Martinican politician, physician and independence activist.

Born in Le Lamentin, Aliker co-founded the Martinican Progressive Party (MPP) in March 1958. In January 2009, at the age of 102, he married Marcelle Landry (1928–April 2011), who he had lived with for nearly sixty years. On 27 October 2013, Aliker was hospitalized in Fort-de-France following a fall at his home. He died at the Fort-de-France hospital on 5 December 2013, aged 106.
