= Ärsenik =

French rap group

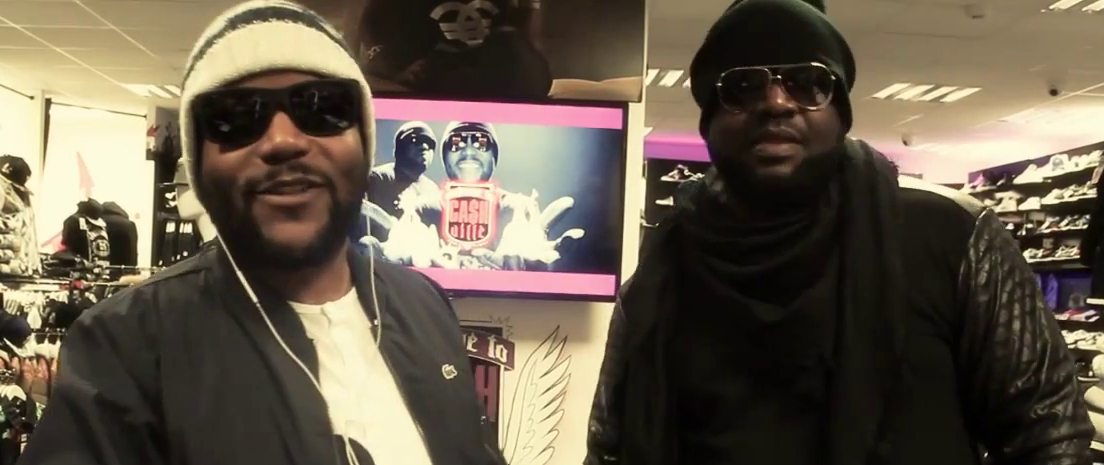

Background information
- Origin: Villiers-le-Bel, France
- Genres: French rap
- Years active: 1992–2026
- Past members: Lino (Gaëlino M'Bani); Calbo (Calboni M'Bani)

Ärsenik was a rap group based in Villiers-le-Bel, France, active between 1992 and 2026. It had been made up of two brothers, Lino (Gaëlino M'Bani) and Calbo (Calboni M'Bani), whose family is originally from Congo.

== Career ==
Ärsenik started as a band in mid 1990s. Until 1997, the group also included Tony Truand, a cousin. In 1998, now a duo, Ärsenik released their first album Quelques gouttes suffisent went double gold. A new album was planned for 2005, but the two brothers instead decided to concentrate on solo albums. Lino released Paradis Assassiné en 2005, which was the name of a solo song on the group's second album.

In 2007 the group released a disc titled S'il en reste quelque chose which included the most popular songs from the two brothers, such as "L'enfer remonte à la surface", "Rime & chatiments" and "Sexe, pouvoir & biftons".

Revered as one of the original rap groups, their music voices the disaffection of the French underclass, combining African and Arabic melodies and beats with French lyrics. French rap is filled with slang that is hard for even French-speakers to understand; whole songs are delivered in Verlan, the ingenious, dizzying slang in which words are reversed or recombined. Like France's chanson tradition, French rap is also famous for emphasizing lyrics, and the rappers are widely viewed as heirs to the chansonniers.

As part of Bisso Na Bisso

In the late 1990s, Lino and Calbo teamed up with a group of rappers who were also second-generation Africans, on a collaborative project called Bisso Na Bisso, an expression which means "just between ourselves" in Lingala, the most commonly spoken language in the Congo region. Part of this group were Ben-J (from Les Neg'Marrons), Passi (from Ministère A.M.E.R.), twin brothers Doc and G Kill (from 2Bal), and Mystik and his female cousin M'Passi. The group embarked on a collective return to their African roots, featuring music with an innovative fusion of styles, that mixed modern hip-hop and zouk sounds with traditional Congolese rumba.

Calbo died on 4 January 2026, at the age of 52.

== Members and solo/other projects ==
The members of Ärsenik have engaged in various personal projects besides the band. Rapper Lino has released two solo albums of his own, Paradis assassiné released in September 2005 and Radio Bitume released in May 2012. Both have charted in France and particularly Paradis assassiné released on Hostile Records was a great commercial success. The title is a title of an Ärsenik album. In 2004, he collaborated in a music project by Kery James in the single "Relève la tête" credited to "Kery James presents Lino, AP, Diam's, Passi, Matt & Kool Shen". In 2007, he also collaborated with three tracks on rapper Stomy Bugsy album Rimes Passionnelles and in 2009, took part in Bisso Na Bisso's project Africa. In 2012 he signed with AZ, now part of Universal Music.

Rapper Calbo continued with a solo music career. In 2003, he charted in a hit "Trop de peine" by Lynnsha featuring Calbo vocals. In 2012, he released his solo album titled 6ème Chaudron and in June 2013, he released his solo single "C'est là-bas" on Trèfle record label accompanied by a music video. It featured another fellow Congolese artist known as VR.

== Discography ==
=== Studio albums ===
Album Details	Charts	
Album Details	FR	BEL Wa
Quelques gouttes suffisent...: Released: 1998; Record label: Hostile Records	10	–
Quelque chose à survécu...: Released: 2002; Record label: Hostile Records	8	27

=== Compilation albums ===
Album Details	Charts	
Album Details	FR	BEL Wa
S'il en reste quelque chose...: Released: 2007; Record label: Hostile Records	–	–

=== Collaboration albums ===
Title and details	Notes
Racines: Type: Album; Credit: as part of Bisso Na Bisso; Released: 1999; Record label: Issap productions	Collective including Passi, Mystik, Ben-J (Nèg Marrons), 2Bal, Ärsenik, M'Passi (Melgroove)
Le 15 Mai 1999: Type: Live album; Credit: as part of Bisso Na Bisso; Released: 1999	
Noyau Dur: Type: Album; Credit: as part of Noyau Dur; Released: 2005; Record label: Hostile Records	Collective including Ärsenik, Neg' Marrons and Pit Baccardi

=== Singles ===
Year	Single	Charts	Album
Year	Single	FR	Album
1998	"Affaires de famille"	44	Quelques gouttes suffisent...
2002	"P.O.I.S.O.N."	89	Quelque chose à survécu...
2002	"Regarde le monde"	89	Quelque chose à survécu...

== See also ==
- French rap
- French hip hop
- List of French hip hop artists
- Secteur Ä
- Stomy Bugsy
- Lunatic
- M.Dia
