= Passi =

Hip-hop artist (born 1972)

- Born: Passi Balende; 21 December 1972 (age 53); Brazzaville, Republic of Congo
- Genre: Hip hop
- Years active: 1992–present

Passi Balende (French pronunciation: [pasi]) is a rapper artist who became famous in the mid-1990s with the group Ministère AMER, which included himself, Doc Gynéco and Stomy Bugsy. He is most widely known, however, as a solo artist, as well as a participant in many other groups, such as Bisso Na Bisso and Dis l'heure 2 zouk.

== Biography ==
Passi was born on 21 December 1972, in Brazzaville, Congo. In 1979, his family moved to Sarcelles, a suburb of Paris. He graduated from lycée and created the band Ministère AMER with Stomy Bugsy and Doc Gyneco, who he had gone to school with. The group's first album, Pourquoi tant de haine?, was released in 1992, and Passi was forced to end his agronomy studies at the University of Paris (Nanterre) to be able to focus on music. Ministère AMER followed up with "95200" which was released in 1994.

Passi's first solo album, Les tentations, was released in 1997, and it sold 450,000 copies. The project Bisso na Bisso (meaning 'Just between ourselves' in Lingala, Congo's most widely spoken language), was a collective of French hip-hop artists with African origins. It included names such as Ärsenik, and he released their album Racines in 1999. That same year, Passi released his second solo album, Genèse.

In 2002, Passi was asked to create the anthem for the African Nations Cup football competition together with Congolese singer Papa Wemba. The two eventually managed to attract into the project such names as Youssou N'Dour and Cheb Mami. Passi's third album, Odyssée, came out in 2004.

Passi is also known as the artist whose song, "Il fait chaud" ("It's hot"), was featured in the last episode in the television show, Sex and the City. The song was not credited at the end of the show, leaving many viewers to call the song simply "The French Rap".

Passi appeared in the sixth episode of The Amazing Race 27 in 2015, in which teams were required to perform one of his songs, "79 à 99", as part of a Detour challenge.

== Discography ==
=== Ministère A.M.E.R ===
- 1992 : Ministère AMER - Pourquoi Tant de Haine
- 1994 : Ministère AMER - 95200

=== Solo ===
- 1997 : Les Tentations
- 2001 : Genèse
- 2004 : Odyssée
- 2007 : Révolution
- 2007 : Évolution

=== Bisso Na Bisso ===
- 1998 : Bisso Na Bisso - Racines
- 1999 : Bisso Na Bisso - Le 15 mai 1999 (live)

=== Dis l'heure 2 zouk (as producer) ===
- 2002 : Dis l'heure 2 Rimes
- 2003 : Dis l'heure 2 Zouk
- 2004 : Dis l'heure 2 Ragga Dancehall
- 2005 : Dis L'Heure 2 Afro Zouk vol.1
- 2006 : Dis L'heure 2 Hip Hop/Rock
