= Stomy Bugsy =

French rapper and actor (born 1972)

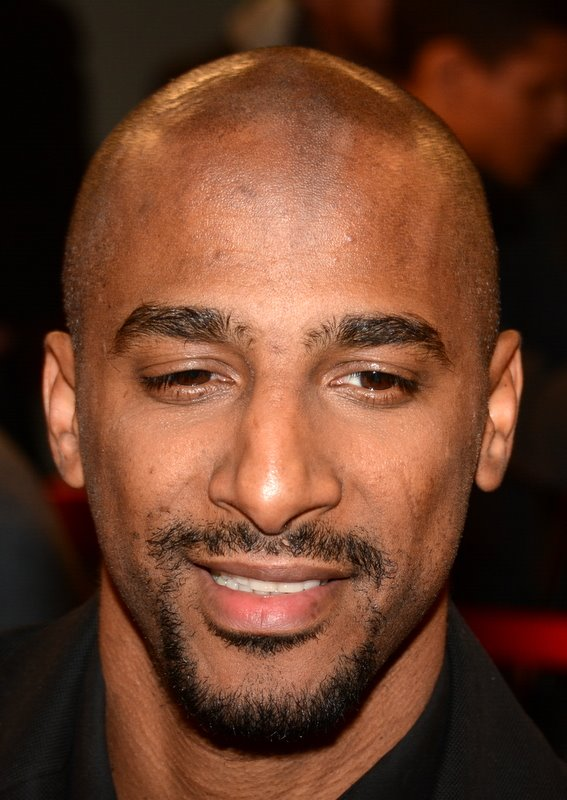
- Stomy Bugsy in 2013

Background information
- Born: Gilles Duarte; 21 May 1972 (age 54); Paris, France
- Origin: Paris, France
- Genres: French rap
- Occupations: Rapper, actor
- Years active: 1991-present

Gilles Duarte (French pronunciation: [ʒil dwaʁte]; born 21 May 1972), better known by his stage name Stomy Bugsy, is a French rapper and actor from Sarcelles, France.

== Biography ==
Born in Paris on 21 May 1972 of Cap Verdian origins, Duarte co-founded hip hop band Ministère AMER in the early 90s. In 1996, he started a solo career with the album Le Calibre qu'il te faut (The calibre that you need) and found great success with the single "Mon papa à moi est un gangster". He went on and released 5 more full-length solo albums and 10 collaborative albums including one live record with hip-hop collective Secteur Ä. His latest solo release is Royalties in 2015, released online on 27 April 2015.

Duarte has also had several acting roles including Ma 6-T va crack-er in 1997, 3 Zeros in 2001, Gomèz and Tavares in 2003, Nèg maron in 2005, Anna Meyer, assistante de choc in 2006, and Aliker in 2008 which he portrayed André Aliker, a Martinique Communism journalist in the 1930s. He later appeared in Bye Bye Blondie (2012), an adaptation of a book by author Virginie Despentes.

=== Stage name ===
The origin of his stage name was known in the 1980s. The second part of the name, Bugsy, is derived after the mafia Bugsy Siegel.

== Personal life ==
He has two sons, Bilal, born in 1992, who started a rapping career in 2014 under the stage name Sonof, and Lat Dior born in 2013.

Stomy Bugsy is the nephew of the former Thai boxing champion Aurelién Duarte.

== Discography ==
=== Albums ===
- Le prince des lascars (1996) (The prince of thugs)
- Le calibre qu'il te faut (1996) (The calibre that you need)
- Oh Lé Lé Lé (Cabo Verde) REMIX (1996)
- Trop jeune pour mourir (2000) (Too young to die)
- Black Pimp Fada (2000)
- 4ème Round (2003) (4th (French) Round (English))
- Rimes Passionnelles (2007) (Rhymes of passion)
- Royalties (2015)

With Ministère AMER:

- Pourquoi Tant de Haine (1992)
- 95200 (1994)
- L'Intégrale (2 CD) - Compilation
- Les Meilleurs Dossiers (2004)

==== Compilation albums ====
- Le Secteur Ä (Live) (1998)
- Mixomatose (1999)
- Secteur Ä All Stars (2000)
- Double Pénétration (2001)
- Nos probéza ké nos rikéza (2006) with Mc Malcriado, in Cape Verdean Creole

=== Singles ===
- "Le prince des lascars" ("The Prince of Thugs") (1992)
- "Mes forces décuplent quand on m'inculpe"
- "Mon papa à moi est un gangster" ("My Father is a Gangster")
- "La vie c'est comme ça"
- "Gangster d'amour" ("Gangster in Love")
- "Black Pimp Fada" (with Michel Gohou) (2000)
- "Une femme en prison" ("A Woman in Prison") (feat Kelly Rowland) (2003)
- "Aucun Dieu ne pourra me pardonner (feat. Nâdiya) ("No god can forgive me")
- Ho lé lé lé (Cabo Verde) (feat. Izé)
- "Motivation"
- "Viens avec moi" (feat Passi)
- "Sois Hardcore" (2008)
  - Remix version by Alpha 5.20, Tequilla, James Kpage, Lino Despo Rutti and a few others
- "Même pas mort" (2008)
- "Demain j'arrête" (2009)

=== Other recordings and collaborations ===
Partial list

- 1995:
  - Ministère A.M.E.R. - "Sacrifices de poulets" on the film soundtrack La Haine
  - Hamed Daye feat. Stomy Bugsy - "Travail au corps" on the compilation L'Art D'Utiliser Son Savoir by DJ Desh
- 1996:
  - Stomy Bugsy - "Le prince des lascars" (Casino Mysto Remix) on the maxi Le Prince Des Lascars
  - Stomy Bugsy feat. Karlito - "Bouche à bouche à un mort", on the CD single Oh Lé Lé Lé
  - Stomy Bugsy feat. Les Rongeurs - "Show Lapin" (Bunny Show) on the maxi Oh Lé Lé Lé Remixes
- 1997:
  - Nèg' Marrons feat. Ministère AMER, Doc Gynéco, Hamed Daye & Ärsenik - "Tel Une Bombe" on the album Rue Case Nègres by Nèg' Marrons
  - Stomy Bugsy - "Avoir le pouvoir" on the film Ma 6-T Va Crak-Er
  - Stomy Bugsy - "Histoire de seuf" on the double CD Mes Forces Décuplent Quand On M'Inculpe by Stomy Bugsy
  - DJ Kheops feat. Stomy Bugsy - "Le Play-Boy de Sarcelles" on the album Sad Hill by DJ Kheops (IAM)
  - Passi feat. Stomy Bugsy - "Le Keur Sambo" on the album Les Tentations by Passi
  - TSN feat. Doudou Masta, EJM, Lamifa, Sages Po', Nemesis & Ministère AMER - "La solidarité noire" on the album Le Mal De La Nuit by TSN
  - Cercle Rouge Productions feat. Assassin, IAM, Ministère AMER, Fabe, Yazid, Rootsneg', Sléo, Ménélik, Soldafadas, Arco, Mystik, Kabal, Azé, Radikalkicker - "11'30 contre les lois racistes" on a double CD 11'30 Contre Les Lois Racistes by Cercle Rouge
- 1998:
  - Donya feat. Stomy Bugsy - "Morgan de toi" on the album 100 Regrets by Donya
  - Stomy Bugsy feat. Kybla - "Donne Moi Du Rêve" on the movie soundtrack Zonzon
  - Cut Killer feat. Fonky Family, KDD, Ménélik & Stomy Bugsy - "Écoute le style rap 98" on the promotional 2CD Écoute le style rap
  - Rainmen feat. Stomy Bugsy - "La Rage Au Mic" on the album Armaguedon by Rainmen
- 1999:
  - Jane Fostin feat. Stomy Bugsy - "Quand Stomy te fuit" on the compilation Indigo R'n'B
  - Djamatik feat. Stomy Bugsy & Pit Baccardi - "Reggae Night" on the album Djamatik Connections by Djamatik
- 2000:
  - Stomy Bugsy - "No comment" (also as "No Comment") on the compilation L'Hip Hopée Vol.2
  - Stomy Bugsy, Ärsenik & Jane Fostin - "On Ira Tous au paradis" on the film soundtrack Trafic D'Influence
  - Izé feat. Stomy Bugsy - "Propulse" on the album Double Nationalité by Izé
- 2001:
  - Passi feat. Stomy Bugsy - "Le Plan B-2 (La Cicatrice)" on the album Genèse by Passi
  - Hamed Daye feat. Stomy Bugzy - "Le Plan B-3 (La Mèche et La Brèche)" on the album L'or Noir by Hamed Daye
  - Stomy Bugsy feat. Lion Bizness (Djamatik & Kulu Ganja) - "Prise d'otages" on the double CD Prise D'Otages by Stomy Bugsy
  - Stomy Bugsy - "J'reviens au rap dur" on the double CD Prise D'Otages by Stomy Bugsy
- 2002:
  - Hamed Daye & Stomy Bugsy - "Instinct" on the film soundtrack Samouraï
  - Stomy Bugsy - "Motivation" on the film soundtrack 3 Zéros
  - Stomy Bugsy & Doc Gynéco - "Bugsdoc 18" feat Doc Gynéco on the compilation Explicit 18
  - Doc Gynéco feat. Stomy Bugsy - Frotti Frotta "(C'est l'amour qui contrôle)" on the album Solitaire by Doc Gynéco
  - Stomy Bugsy - "Freestyle" on the mixtape What's The Flavor #50 by DJ Poska & Funky Maestro
  - Ministère AMER feat. Doc Gynéco & Hamed Daye - "Le Colis" (promotional title)
- 2003:
  - Doc Gynéco feat. Stomy Bugsy & Janik MC - "Big Up" on the album Menu Best Of by Doc Gynéco
- 2004:
  - K.Ommando Toxik feat. Stomy Bugsy - "Sacrifice 2 poulets" on the street CD Retour Vers Le Futur by K.Ommando Toxik
  - Passi feat. Stomy Bugsy & Zao - "Combattants" on the album Odyssée by Passi
  - Darkman feat. Stomy Bugsy & S Galo - "Kreol oriental" on the album Darky Le Jour, Daman La Nuit by Darkman
  - Ministère AMER feat. Hamed Daye & Doc Gynéco - "Plan B" on the mixtape Los Angeles Most Wanted by DJ Noise
- 2005:
  - Cuizinier(TTC) feat. TTC, Sté Strausz & Stomy Bugsy - "Dans le club" ("By the Club") (San Andreas Remix) on the CD Pour Les Filles Vol. 1 by Cuizinier
  - Ministère AMER - "J'aime le Rap" ("I Am the Rap") on the compilation Illicite Projet by Medeline
  - "Les Meurtres se font la nuit" on the compilation West Rider 2
- 2006:
  - Johnny Hallyday feat. Ministère A.M.E.R. & Doc Gynéco - "Le Temps Passe" on the album Ma vérité by Johnny Hallyday
  - Doc Gynéco feat. Stomy Bugsy - "Tu mens" on the album Un Homme Nature by Doc Gynéco
  - Stomy Bugsy - "Foot 2 Rue" on an LP Foot 2 Rue
  - "L'état" on the mixtape Poésie Urbainz Vol.2
- 2007:
  - Stomy Bugsy - "Brûlez tout" on the compilation Écoute la rue Marianne
  - Stomy Bugsy - "Tolérance zéro" (Zero Tolerance) on the compilation Explicit Politik
  - Seth Gueko feat. Stomy Bugzy - "Lève toi et braque" on the compilation Self Défense
- 2008:
  - Stomy Bugzy, feat. SMS - "Click" on the album by SMS Click la ruée vers l'or
  - Stomy Bugzy, feat. Booba, Lino, Dieudonné, Lady Laistee, Hamed Daye & Sofiane - "Code noir" ("Code Black")
  - Stomy Bugzy, feat. Dobe As and Driver - "Miss Mec" on the compilation Bandana Music
  - SÄ Remix feat. Samsey and Driver - "Mous'sä Well Maiky"
  - "Come Back" Remix feat Pit Bacardi
- 2011:
  - Stomy Bugsy feat Aelpéacha et Real Chanty - "Au Soleil" on the album Val 2 Marne Rider II

== Filmography ==
- Ma 6-T va crack-er (1997) (My hood will crack-er)
- Beauté Fatale (2000) (Fatal Beauty)
- De l'amour (2001) (About love)
- Pretty Things (2001)
- Le Boulet (2002) (The drag)
- 3 zéros (2002) (3 zeros)
- Le Fleuve (2003) (The River)
- Gomez et Tavarès (2003) (Gomez and Tavares)
- Nèg Maron (2005) (The concealed man)
- The Best of Times (2006)
- Gomez contre Tavares (2007) (Gomez vs Tavares)
- Sang Froid (2008) (Cool)
- Aliker (2009)
- Bye Bye Blondie (2012)

=== Television ===
- Frappes interdites (2005)
- Anna Meyer (Anna Meyer, assistante de choc) (2006)
- La Glisse (2011)
- Falco (2015)

== Honours ==
- Chevalier of the Ordre des Arts et des Lettres (2026)
