= List of by-elections in Dominica =

The following is a list of by-elections in Dominica.

== List of by-elections ==
Date	Constituency	Incumbent	Party	Winner	Party	Cause
27 July 1992	Portsmouth	Michael Douglas	DLP	Rosie Douglas	DLP	Death
20 December 1993	Salybia	Worrel Sanford	DLP	Francois Barrie	UWP	Resigned
12 August 1996	Mahaut	Brian Alleyne	DFP	Julian Prevost	UWP	Resigned
December 2000	Portsmouth	Rosie Douglas	DLP	Ian Douglas	DLP	Death
April 2004	Grand Bay	Pierre Charles	DLP	John Fabien	DLP	Death
9 July 2010	Marigot	Edison James	UWP	Edison James	UWP	Parliament boycott
9 July 2010	Salisbury	Hector John	UWP	Hector John	UWP	Parliament boycott
7 June 2016	Soufrière	Ian Pinard	DLP	Denise Charles	DLP	Resigned
25 November 2021	Grand Bay	Edward Registe	DLP	Vince Henderson	DLP	Death
