= Salisbury (Dominica constituency) =

Electoral district of Dominica

- Constituency for the House of Assembly of Dominica
- Electorate: 2,676 (2022)

Current constituency
- Party: Independent
- Representative: Jesma Paul-Victor

Salisbury is one of the 21 electoral districts of the House of Assembly of Dominica. It contains the areas of Coulibistrie, Morne Rachette, and Salisbury. It is currently represented by independent MP Jesma Paul-Victor.

== Geography ==
The Salisbury constituency covers the north west coast of Dominica. It contains the main settlements of Salisbury, Barroui, Coulibistrie, and Morne Rachette. Each village is covered by its own voting district.

== Political history ==
The constituency of Salisbury was created as a result of redistricting in 1980 following the independence of Dominica from the United Kingdom. Its first MP after independence was Dennison John of the Dominica Freedom Party. In 1990, the seat was won by Earl Williams of the United Workers Party. Williams held the seat until 2009 when it was won by his UWP successor Hector John. During his term, John boycotted attending Parliament, alongside former Prime Minister Edison James. This was done by the two in protest against election irregularities. As a result of John's non-attendance, the Speaker of the House of Assembly of Dominica, Alix Boyd Knights declared Salisbury vacant. John regained his seat in the subsequent by-election. The 2022 general election was won by Jesma Paul-Victor, an independent.

== Electorate ==
The following is a list of the number of eligible voters in the Salisbury constituency at the time of each election provided by the Electoral Office of Dominica.

Year	Electorate	Notes
1975	1,246	
1980	1,508	
1985	1,792	
1990	2,075	
1995	2,304	
2000	2,487	
2005	2,520	
2014	2,701	
2019	2,712	
2022	2,676	

== List of representatives ==
Election	Years	Member	Party (Note: Indicates party the MP was running with during their election.)	Notes
1975	1975 – 1980	Bryson Joseph Louis	DLP	
1980	1980 – 1985	Dennison John	DFP	
1985	1985 – 1990	James Royer	DFP	
1990	1990 – 2009	Earl Williams	UWP	
2009	2009 – 2010	Hector John	UWP	Seat declared vacant in 2010 after parliament boycott.
2010 (Note: By-election)	2010 – 2022	Hector John	UWP	
2022	2022 –	Jesma Paul-Victor	Independent	

== Electoral history ==
The following is a list of election results from the Electoral Office of Dominica. The election results lack spoiled and rejected ballots.

2009 Salisbury general election
Candidate	Party	Votes	%
Hector John	United Workers' Party	817	60.74
Julien B. Royer	Dominica Labour Party	512	38.07
Nettisha Walsh	Dominica Freedom Party	16	1.19
Total		1,345	100.00
UWP hold			

2010 Salisbury by-election
Candidate	Party	Votes	%
Hector John	United Workers' Party	772	65.04
Julien B. Royer	Dominica Labour Party	415	34.96
Total		1,187	100.00
UWP hold			

2014 Salisbury general election
Candidate	Party	Votes	%
Hector John	United Workers' Party	881	60.43
Nicholls Esprit	Dominica Labour Party	577	39.57
Total		1,458	100.00
UWP hold			

2019 Salisbury general election
Candidate	Party	Votes	%
Hector John	United Workers' Party	866	61.86
Nicholls Esprit	Dominica Labour Party	534	38.14
Total		1,400	100.00
UWP hold			

2022 Salisbury general election
Candidate	Party	Votes	%
Jesma Paul-Victor	Independent	617	57.24
Lynsia Frank	Dominica Labour Party	461	42.76
Total		1,078	100.00
IND gain from UWP			
