= Doreen Paul =

Dominican banker (born 1962)

- Born: Doreen James; 1962 (age 63–64); Layou, British Dominica
- Occupations: banker, politician
- Years active: 1983–present

Doreen Paul (born 1962) was a Dominican banker who served in politics from 1990 to 2000. She was particularly involved, as the Minister of Health and Social Security, in the development of infrastructure improvement projects including health centers, sports complexes, roads and water systems.

== Early life ==
Doreen James was born in 1962, in the west coast village of Layou in British Dominica to Dorothy and Isaac James. She began her education at the St. Joseph Government School and then attended Convent High School before entering Dominica Grammar School, to complete her high school studies in 1981. While she was attending school, Dominica gained its independence from Britain in 1978. She went on to study at Sixth Form College, graduating in 1983.

== Career ==
Upon completing her education, James initially began working as a teacher. She married Anthony Paul and the couple had two children: Antonio and Nicole. After a brief time teaching, Paul began working at the National Bank of Dominica. She entered politics in 1990 and ran for a seat in the House of Assembly of Dominica, winning the seat for Saint Joseph District for the United Workers Party (UWP). Upon winning a seat, she was dismissed from her position at the bank and took a position at the Roseau Co-operative Credit Union.

In the 1995 general election, Paul was reelected to a five-year term for Saint Joseph District and UWP. Selected by Prime Minister Edison James for his cabinet, she was appointed to serve as the Minister of Health and Social Security. Active as a Minister, Paul pressed for the construction work on health facilities, establishing new centers in Morne Prosper, Salisbury, San Sauveur, Warner, and Woodford Hill, and renovating preexisting centers located in Calibishie, Colihaut, Marigot, Pointe Michel, Salybia, Scotts Head, and Soufriere. Her programs for improvements included both equipment and training to expand the health care services throughout the island.

In her district, Paul actively worked to develop the infrastructure improving roads and sports centers. She established new water systems for Bells, Mero and Saint Joseph; secured a new housing development and village bridge for Layou; and developed the project bringing electricity to the Bells and Layou Valley communities.

Regionally, in 1996, Paul served as chair of the Organisation of Eastern Caribbean States (OECS)'s Ministers of Health and as president of their Eastern Caribbean Drug Services, which used collective bargaining to lower the costs of the procurement of pharmaceuticals. She initiated, the following year, an annual conference of the Ministers of Health of the OECS, attending its first meeting, which was held in St. Kitts in 1998. In 1999, Paul traveled to Geneva to meet with Gro Harlem Brundtland, director of the World Health Organization. Heading the CARICOM delegation, Paul was one of the administrators to provide input on Phase Two of the Caribbean Cooperation in Health initiative.

After she lost her seat in the 2000 general election to Vince Henderson, Paul returned to the private sector. She is most remembered for her contributions to improving health care in the country.
