= 1995 Dominican general election =

- 12 June 1995

21 of the 30 seats in the House of Assembly 11 seats needed for a majority
- Registered: 57,632
- Turnout: 65.18% (▼1.46pp)
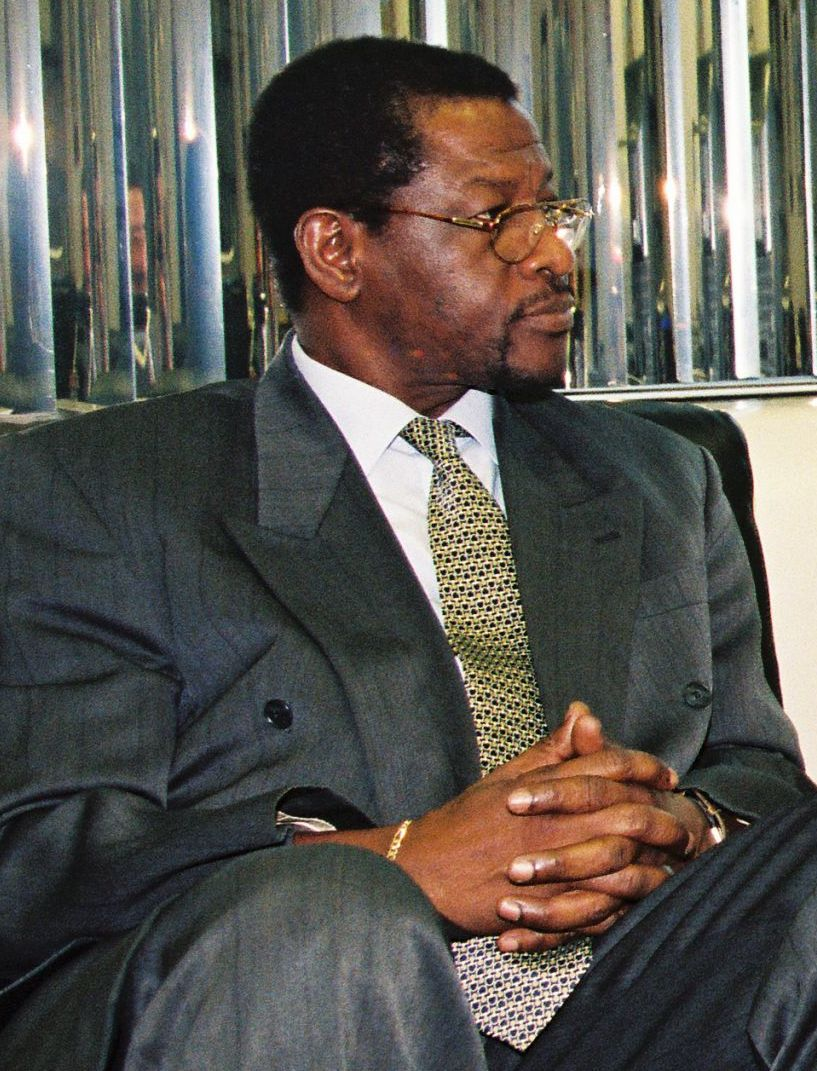

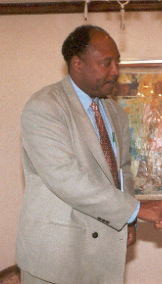
	First party	Second party	Third party
Leader	Edison James	Brian Alleyne	Rosie Douglas
Party	UWP	DFP	DLP
Last election	26.85%, 6 seats	49.43%, 11 seats	23.50%, 4 seats
Seats won	11	5	5
Seat change	▲5	▼6	▲1
Popular vote	12,777	13,317	11,064
Percentage	34.36%	35.81%	29.75%
Swing	▲7.51pp	▼13.62pp	▲6.25pp
- Results by constituency
Prime Minister before election
Eugenia Charles
DFP
Elected Prime Minister
Edison James
UWP

General elections were held in Dominica on 12 June 1995. Although the Dominica Freedom Party received the most votes, the United Workers' Party won 11 of the 21 seats. Voter turnout was 65.2%, the lowest since universal suffrage was introduced in 1951.

== Results ==
Party	Votes	%	Seats	+/–
Dominica Freedom Party	13,317	35.81	5	–6
United Workers' Party	12,777	34.36	11	+5
Dominica Labour Party	11,064	29.75	5	+1
Independents	29	0.08	0	New
Total	37,187	100.00	21	0
Valid votes	37,187	99.00		
Invalid/blank votes	376	1.00		
Total votes	37,563	100.00		
Registered voters/turnout	57,632	65.18		
Source: Nohlen

=== List of elected members ===
Constituency	Party	Elected member
Castle Bruce	UWP	Romanus Bannis
Colihaut	DFP	Herbert Sabaroche
Cottage	DLP	Reginald Austrie
Grand Bay	DLP	Pierre Charles
La Plaine	UWP	Ronald Green
Mahaut	DFP	Brian Alleyne
Marigot	UWP	Edison James
Morne Jaune/Riviere Cyrique	UWP	Gertrude Roberts
Paix Bouche	DLP	Matthew Walter
Petite Savanne	DLP	Urban Baron
Portsmouth	DLP	Rosie Douglas
Roseau-Central	DFP	Charles Savarin
Roseau-North	UWP	Julius Timothy
Roseau-South	DFP	Ossie Walsh
Roseau-Valley	UWP	Norris Charles
Salisbury	UWP	Earl Williams
Salybia	UWP	Francois Barrie
St. Joseph	UWP	Doreen Paul
Soufrière	DFP	Charles Maynard
Vieille Case	UWP	Vernice Bellony
Wesley	UWP	Peter Carbon
Source: Electoral Office
