= 2027 in Dominica =

- Decades: 2000s; 2010s; 2020s
- See also: Other events of 2027; Timeline of Dominican history

Events in the year 2027 in Dominica.

== Events ==
- By December – 2027 Dominican general election

== Holidays ==
- 1 January – New Year's Day
- 8–9 February – Carnival
- 26 March – Good Friday
- 29 March – Easter Monday
- 6 May – Labour Day
- 17 May – Whit Monday
- 2 August – Emancipation Day
- 3 November – Independence Day
- 4 November – Community Service Day
- 25 December – Christmas Day
- 26 December – Boxing Day

== See also ==
- 2020s
- 2027 Atlantic hurricane season
