= 2022 in Dominica =

- Decades: 2000s; 2010s; 2020s
- See also: Other events of 2022; Timeline of Dominican history

Events in the year 2022 in Dominica.

== Incumbents ==
- President: Charles Savarin
- Prime Minister: Roosevelt Skerrit

== Events ==
Ongoing — COVID-19 pandemic in Dominica

=== Sports ===
- Dominica at the 2022 Commonwealth Games
- Dominica at the 2022 World Athletics Championships

== Deaths ==
- 23 January – Bryson Joseph Louis, politician (born 1925)
