= Marigot (Dominica constituency) =

Electoral district of Dominica

- Constituency for the House of Assembly of Dominica
- Electorate: 2,631 (2022)

Current constituency
- Party: Independent
- Representative: Anthony S. Charles

Marigot is one of the 21 electoral districts of the House of Assembly of Dominica. It contains the areas of Marigot and Melville Hall. It is currently represented by independent MP Anthony S. Charles.

== Electorate ==
The following is a list of the number of eligible voters in the Marigot constituency at the time of each election provided by the Electoral Office of Dominica.

Year	Electorate	Notes
1975	1,327	
1980	1,787	
1985	1,901	
1990	2,215	
1995	2,444	
2000	2,516	
2005	2,563	
2014	2,651	
2019	2,687	
2022	2,631	

== List of representatives ==
Election	Years	Member	Party (Note: Indicates party the MP was running with during their election.)	Notes
1975	1975 – 1980	Pattison A. S. Stevens	Independent	
1980	1980 – 1990	Pattison A. S. Stevens	DFP	
1990	1990 – 2010	Edison James	UWP	Served as prime minister from 1995 to 2000. Seat declared vacant in 2010 after parliament boycott.
2010 (Note: By-election)	2010 – 2014	Edison James	UWP	
2014	2014 – 2022	Lennox Linton	UWP	
2022	2022 –	Anthony S. Charles	Independent	

== Electoral history ==
The following is a list of election results from the Electoral Office of Dominica. The election results lack spoiled and rejected ballots.

2009 Marigot general election
Candidate	Party	Votes	%
Edison James	United Workers' Party	835	78.55
Dayton Baptiste	Dominica Labour Party	228	21.45
Total		1,063	100.00
UWP hold			

2010 Marigot by-election
Candidate	Party	Votes	%
Edison James	United Workers' Party	669	83.62
Dayton Baptiste	Dominica Labour Party	131	16.38
Total		800	100.00
UWP hold			

2014 Marigot general election
Candidate	Party	Votes	%
Lennox Linton	United Workers' Party	935	75.77
Martin G. Christmas	Dominica Labour Party	299	24.23
Total		1,234	100.00
UWP hold			

2019 Marigot general election
Candidate	Party	Votes	%
Lennox Linton	United Workers' Party	882	76.63
Gregory Riviere	Dominica Labour Party	269	23.37
Total		1,151	100.00
UWP hold			

2022 Marigot general election
Candidate	Party	Votes	%
Anthony S. Charles	Independent	491	59.44
Gregory Riviere	Dominica Labour Party	329	39.83
Carlos K. Charles	Team Unity Dominica	6	0.73
Total		826	100.00
IND gain from UWP			
