= 2023 in Dominica =

- Decades: 2000s; 2010s; 2020s
- See also: Other events of 2023; Timeline of Dominican history

Events in the year 2023 in Dominica.

== Incumbents ==
- President:
  - Charles Savarin
  - Sylvanie Burton
- Prime Minister: Roosevelt Skerrit

== Events ==
Ongoing — COVID-19 pandemic in Dominica

== Deaths ==
- 26 January – Irvine Shillingford, cricketer (born 1944).
- 3 September – Francois Barrie, former MP
