= Batali River =

River in St Joseph parish, Dominica

Coordinates: 15°27′N 61°27′W

The Batali or Batalie River is a river in Dominica. It originates on the southern slopes of Morne Diablotins, flowing southwest to discharge into the Caribbean Sea on the country's northwestern coast, close to the town of Barroui. It is part of the Northwest Basin in Dominica, one of the 6 major river basins in the country, and is among the top 20 largest rivers in Dominica with an area of 1245.5 km^{2}. It is 5.52 km long and has an elevation drop of 570m.

== History ==
In 2011, adventure park company Wacky Rollers proposed dredging the Batali river to allow for a river tubing facility at the location. Following backlash and protests from residents of Morne Rachette and Coulisbistrie, environmental minister Kenneth Darroux scrapped plans for the diversion.

In January 2019, hundreds of dead fish were found in the river. It was thought dredging work for the under construction Bitalie Bridge had left the fish stranded. Between three and four thousand fish however were saved by Forestry and Wildlife Division operatives.

== Flora and fauna ==
Various types of flora and fauna have been described in the Batali river ecosystem. Fauna range from Tridax procumbens, vines (p. 50), Macfadyena unguis-cati, Cordia curassavica, Homalium racemosum, Macfadyena unguis-cati, Tecoma stans, Cordia divaricata, Heliotropium ternatum, Erythroxylum havanense.

== See also ==
- List of rivers of Dominica
