= Minister of Foreign Affairs (Dominica) =

This is a list of foreign ministers of Dominica.

- 1978–1979: Leo Irving Austin
- 1979–1980: Oliver Seraphin
- 1980–1990: Eugenia Charles
- 1990–1995: Brian G. K. Alleyne
- 1995–1998: Edison James
- 1998–2000: Norris Charles
- 2000: Rosie Douglas
- 2000–2001: Pierre Charles
- 2001–2005: Osborne Riviere
- 2005–2007: Charles Savarin
- 2007–2008: Roosevelt Skerrit
- 2008–2010: Vince Henderson
- 2010–2014: Roosevelt Skerrit
- 2014–2019: Francine Baron
- 2019–2022: Kenneth Darroux
- 2022–present: Vince Henderson
