= Dayton Baptiste =

Dominican politician

Dayton Baptiste (born 1965) is a Dominican politician in the Dominica Labour Party, and a former police officer in Antigua. He served briefly as an appointed senator in the Dominica House of Assembly in 2010, and has twice been an unsuccessful candidate for an elected seat.

== Biography ==
Baptiste was born in Marigot, Dominica, and graduated from the Marigot Foundation High School. He emigrated to Antigua in 1983, where he helped build houses for the homeless as part of a project for his church. Baptiste then served as an officer in the Royal Antigua Police Force for 18 years, achieving the rank of corporal. After leaving the police force, he remained in Antigua, where he joined the Fire Service and started a bakery.

Baptiste returned to Dominica to contest the Marigot constituency on the Labour Party ticket in the 2009 general election. He lost to the opposition United Workers' Party (UWP) candidate, former prime minister Edison James, on 18 December 2009, with 228 votes to James' 835 votes (21.4% to 78.6%). Baptiste was then appointed to serve as a senator in the House of Assembly on 4 February 2010. Baptiste resigned his seat to again contest the Marigot constituency in a by-election after James' seat was declared vacant due to the UWP boycott of the House of Assembly. Baptiste again lost to James on 9 July 2010, with 131 votes to James' 669 (16.4% to 83.8%).
