= 2026 in Dominica =

- Decades: 2000s; 2010s; 2020s
- See also: Other events of 2026; Timeline of Dominican history

Events in the year 2026 in Dominica.

== Incumbents ==
- President: Sylvanie Burton
- Prime Minister: Roosevelt Skerrit

== Events ==
- 5 January – Dominica reaches an agreement with the United States to accept migrants deported from the latter country.
- The World’s Longest Cable Car, the Dominica Cable Car is expected to be fully operational or in its final commissioning phase in 2026.

== Holidays ==
- 1 January – New Year's Day
- 16–17 February – Carnival
- 3 April – Good Friday
- 6 April – Easter Monday
- 4 May – Labour Day
- 25 May – Whit Monday
- 3 August – Emancipation Day
- 3 November – Independence Day
- 4 November – Community Service Day
- 25 December – Christmas Day
- 26 December – Boxing Day

== Deaths ==
- 17 April – Ian Pinard, 54, MP (2005–2009, 2014–2016).

== See also ==
- 2020s
- 2026 Atlantic hurricane season
- 2026 in the Caribbean
