= 2021 Grand Bay by-election =

By-election in Dominica

The 2021 Grand Bay by-election was held on 25 November. It was triggered by the death of Edward Registe. The election was won by ruling party candidate Vince Henderson.

== Background ==
Edward Registe, the MP representing the Grand Bay constituency in the House of Assembly, died in office on 1 September 2021.

By 14 October, no party in Dominica had announced a candidate for the by-election to replace Registe in the House. The Sun Dominica had noted that since the election of Pierre Charles in 1985, the ruling Dominica Labour Party (DLP) was "demoralisingly dominant" in the constituency. In the 2019 general election the candidate for the opposition United Workers' Party (UWP) Nept Kannit Pacquette had done poorly. Despite this, Pacquette had considered running again. The president of the Alternative People's Party (APP) claimed his party would run a candidate.

On 26 October, Prime Minister Roosevelt Skerrit announced that Vince Henderson would be the DLP's nominee for the by-election. Henderson had previously served in the House of Assembly representing the St. Joseph constituency after being elected in 2000. Since 2016, Henderson had been serving as the nation's ambassador the United States and the Organization of American States. Prime Minister Skerrit advised the president to issue a writ for the by-election on 28 October. It was scheduled for 25 November.

Candidate nomination took place on 9 November. There were ultimately three candidates. None of the opposition parties, including the Dominica Freedom Party (DFP), UWP, and APP, fielded candidates. The DFP and APP cited the need for electoral reform as a reason for their lack of participation. Henderson was the only candidate running with a political party. The other candidates were independents: Julius "Handbag" Gabriel and Clarington "Twa Woche" Andrew. The candidates were given electoral symbols on 10 November. Henderson's symbol was the shoe (as requested by the DLP), Gabriel's symbol was the bird, and Andrew's symbol was the tree.

Gabriel was a bus driver. He had announced his candidacy before 27 October. He emphasized his closeness to the constituency. He framed himself as a political outsider and described his lack of political experience and education as a strength. The UWP backed Gabriel's candidacy. Both Gabriel and the UWP criticized Henderson as not being from the Grand Bay constituency. Andrew was a roof specialist and artist residing in Trafalgar, a locality outside of the constituency.

On 11 November, Opposition Leader Lennox Linton sent a letter copied to the chair of the Electoral Commission, Henderson, and the police chief calling for an investigation into Henderson. Linton claimed that Henderson had not proven that he had resigned as ambassador before the time of his nomination as a candidate for the by-election, and that if he was still an ambassador, that would make him ineligible as a candidate. He further claimed Henderson may have illegally made false statements during the nomination process. The government's senior counsel, Anthony Astaphan, claimed that Henderson had resigned as ambassador and that even if he hadn't, he'd still be eligible as a candidate.

By 23 November, there was a protest outside the Electoral Office led by activist Atherton Martin. The protesters called for Henderson to step down, claiming his nomination was invalid, due to the belief that he hadn't resigned as ambassador. They threatened to stop the by-election if Henderson did not step down.

On 24 November, Electoral Commission Chairman Duncan Stowe responded to both Linton and Martin. He claimed that the commission had discussed Linton's request on 15 November, and decided to decline the request. In response to Martin, he said that all three of the candidates' nominations were valid.

The by-election was held during the COVID-19 pandemic. By 24 November, three election workers had "been identified as contacts of a recently identified positive Covid-19 case" according to DOM767. They were subsequently replaced.

== Aftermath ==
The by-election was held on 25 November. Preliminary results showed Henderson had won. In response to the preliminary results, Henderson gave a victory speech. He was sworn in as MP on 29 November. He was sworn in as a cabinet minister on 2 December.

== Results ==
2021 Grand Bay by-election
Candidate	Party	Votes	%
Vince Henderson	Dominica Labour Party	1,230	88.24
Julius Gabriel	Independent	161	11.55
Clarington B. Andrew	Independent	3	0.22
Total		1,394	100.00
Valid votes		1,394	98.10
Invalid/blank votes		27	1.90
Total votes		1,421	100.00
Registered voters/turnout		3,911	36.33
DLP hold			
