= 2010 Dominican by-elections =

Parliamentary by-election in Dominica, 2010

A by-election was held on 9 July 2010 in Dominica, to fill two seats in the House of Assembly that were declared vacant. The contested seats were both won by significant margins by the incumbent candidates, who were members of the opposition United Workers' Party.

Following the results of the 2009 general election conducted on 18 December 2009, the Dominica Labour Party won 18 of the 21 seats in the House of Assembly, with the United Workers' Party in the remaining three. Alleging election irregularities, the UWP members boycotted the Assembly. After two of the three UWP members, Edison James of Marigot and Hector John of Salisbury, did not attend three consecutive sessions of the Assembly, Speaker of the House Alix Boyd Knights declared their seats vacant, and a by-election was scheduled to fill the vacancies.

The UWP argued that the Speaker had no legal authority to declare the seats vacant and that the by-elections were unconstitutional. James and John nevertheless ran in the by-election to retain their former seats. The Labour Party fielded the same candidates that ran unsuccessfully in the 2009 general election, Bentley Royer in Salisbury and Dayton Baptiste in Marigot. Both Royer and Baptiste had been appointed as senators in the interim and resigned these positions to run in the by-election. No candidates from other parties participated in the by-election.

Both James and John won the by-election by even greater margins than in the general election, leaving no change in the distribution of seats in the Assembly. John subsequently became the Leader of the Opposition.

== Results by constituency ==
Marigot	Candidate	Party	Votes	%
	Edison Chenfil James	UWP	669	83.8
	Dayton Baptiste	DLP	131	16.4
Salisbury	Candidate	Party	Votes	%
	Hector "Spags" John	UWP	772	64.4
	Julien B. "Tolo" Royer	DLP	415	34.6
