= 2021 in Dominica =

- Decades: 2000s; 2010s; 2020s
- See also: Other events of 2021; Timeline of Dominican history

The following is a list of events of the year 2021 in Dominica.

== Incumbents ==
- President: Charles Savarin
- Prime Minister: Roosevelt Skerrit

== Events ==
Ongoing — COVID-19 pandemic in Dominica

=== Sports ===
- 23 July to 8 August – Dominica at the 2020 Summer Olympics.

== Deaths ==
- 6 July – Patrick John, politician, prime minister, premier (born 1938).
