= Coulibistrie =

Village in Dominica

Coordinates: 15.460°N 61.451°W

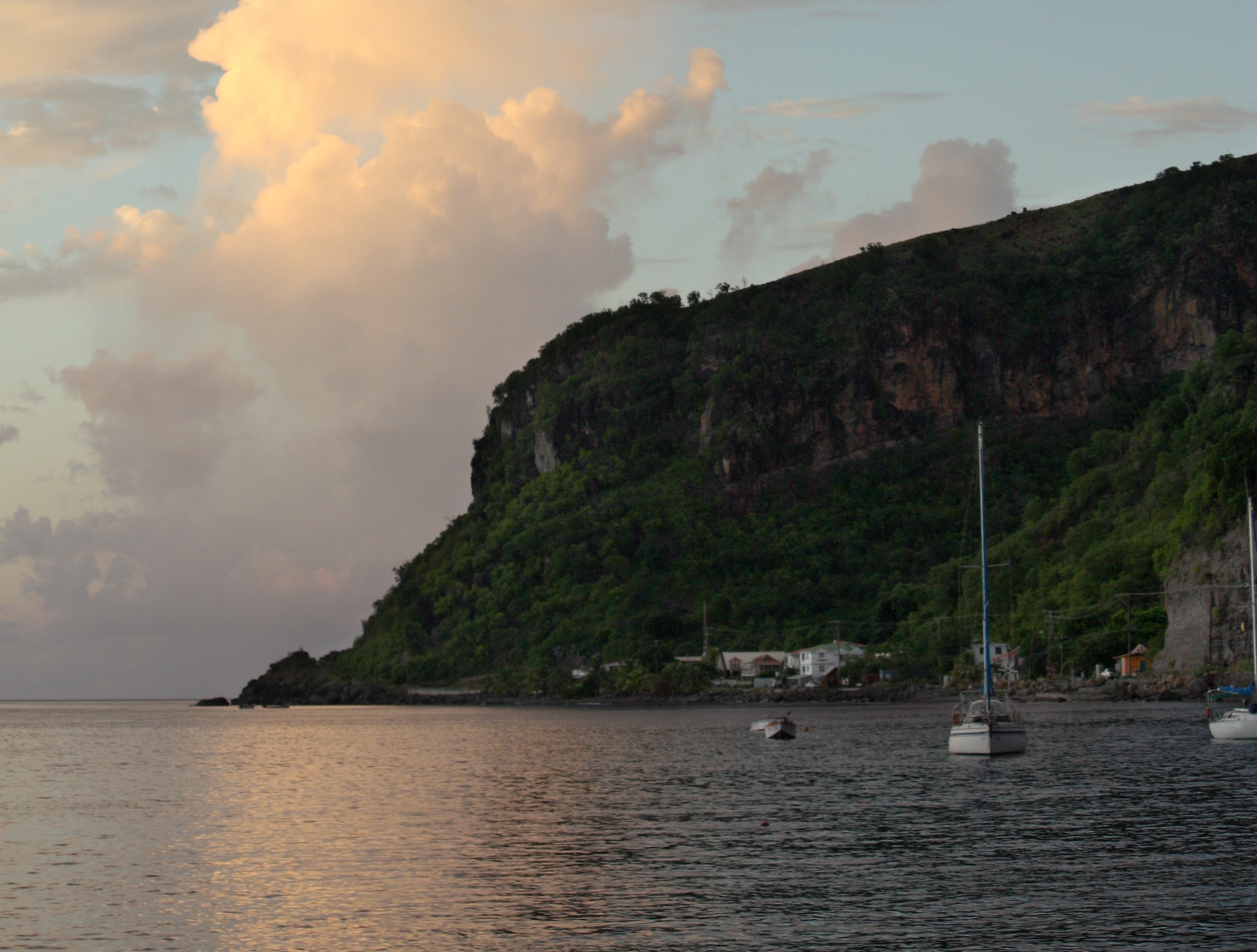
Coulibistrie, seen across Batalie Bay.

Coulibistrie is a village on the west coast of Dominica, in the northwest corner of Saint Joseph Parish. It is between the villages of Colihaut to the north and Morne Rachette to the south. It extends inland from the coast within a deep valley, along both banks of the Coulibistrie River. The village is primarily residential with few businesses. Many of the houses are built directly atop or adjoining the numerous large boulders that litter the valley along its base.

Coulibistrie is part of the Salisbury constituency in the Dominica House of Assembly, in which it is represented by Hector John (UWP) as of the 2009 general election. The village is locally governed by the Coulibistrie/Morne Rachette village council.

The Coulibistrie Roman Catholic Church, a historic stone building with stained-glass windows, is located where the main road in Coulibistrie joins the coastal road.

The village feast of Saint Anne usually takes place in July.
