= Mero, Dominica =

Town in Saint Joseph Parish, Dominica

Coordinates: 15°25′N 61°26′W

Mero is a small town in Saint Joseph Parish, Dominica. It is located in the west of the island, to the north of the mouth of the Layou River. To the north of Mero is Baroui and to the south of Mero is Saint Joseph.
