= Ethelca Brand =

- Born: Marigot
- Awards: Meritorius Service Award (1988); Member of the Order of the British Empire (2000); Officer of the Order of the British Empire (2016)

Ethelca Brand MSA MBE OBE is a Dominican community and charity worker. She was chair of the London-based Dominica Overseas Nationals Association for over 25 years.

Ethelca Brand was born in Marigot, Dominica. She moved to London in 1956 where she had a career in the UK civil service until her retirement in 1995. She became a leader in the Dominican community in England and led fundraising efforts for Dominica following Tropical Storm Erika in 2015 and Hurricane Maria in 2017.

== Awards and honors ==
Ethelca Brand was presented with the Meritorious Service Award by the government of Dominica in 1988. She was named Member of the Order of the British Empire in 2000 "for services to Community Relations". She was named Officer of the Order of the British Empire in 2016 "for services to the community in London."

== Personal life ==
She was married to Rose Clifton Brand 57 years before his death in 2017.
