= Leader of the Opposition (Dominica) =

The Leader of the Opposition of the Commonwealth of Dominica is the Member of Parliament who leads the Official Opposition in the House of Assembly of Dominica.

The current Leader of the Opposition is Jesma Paul-Victor, an independent candidate of the Salisbury constituency, who was sworn in January 2026.

== Provision ==
Chapter IV Section 66 of The Constitution of the Commonwealth of Dominica states:

1. There shall be a Leader of the Opposition who shall be appointed by the President.

2. Whenever there is occasion for the appointment of a Leader of the Opposition the President shall appoint the elected member of the House who appears to him most likely to command the support of a majority of the elected members of the House who do not support the Government: or, if no elected member of the House appears to him to command such support, the elected member of the House who appears to him to command the support of the largest single group of members of the House who do not support the Government:

Provided that if a member of the House was elected at a general election in which he stood as a supporter of a political party and the majority of members of the House elected at that time (whether as Representatives or Senators) stood as supporters of that party, he shall, so long as he remains a member of the House by virtue of that election, not be eligible for appointment as Leader of the Opposition.

== Leaders of the opposition ==
Name	Party	Took office	Left office	Notes
Anthony Moise	DUPP	1966	1970	
Anthony Moise	DFP	1970	April 1975	
Eugenia Charles	DFP	April 1975	July 1979	
Vacant		1979	January 1985	
Matthew Joseph	DDLP	January 1985	1985	
Michael Douglas	DLP	1985	1990	
Edison James	UWP	1 June 1990	14 June 1995	
Brian Alleyne	DFP	1995	1996	
Rosie Douglas	DLP	1996	3 February 2000	
Edison James	UWP	3 February 2000	16 July 2007	
Earl Williams	UWP	16 July 2007	30 July 2008	
Ronald Green	UWP	8 August 2008	3 February 2010	
Hector John	UWP	19 July 2010	8 December 2014	
Lennox Linton	UWP	8 December 2014	7 November 2022	
Jesma Paul-Victor	Independent	20 December 2022	20 June 2024	
Vacant		20 June 2024	22 January 2026	
Jesma Paul-Victor	Independent	22 January 2026	Incumbent	

== Historical notes ==
The House of Assembly did not have a Leader of the Opposition in early 2010, following the results of the 2009 general election. The leader of the opposition United Workers' Party, Ronald Green, lost his seat, and the three UWP Representatives elected boycotted the House of Assembly. This ended with the swearing in of Hector John as Leader of the Opposition on 19 July 2010.
