= Ronald Green (Dominican politician) =

Dominican politician

- Born: Ronald Milner Green
- Education: City College of New York (B.S.), Manhattan College (MA)
- Occupation: Politician

Ronald Milner Green is a Dominican politician who has served as the head of the United Workers' Party (UWP). In that capacity, Green was also the Leader of the Opposition of Dominica from 2005 until 2009, when he lost his seat in the House of Assembly in the general election. Green is now serving in the Assembly as an appointed senator.

== Career ==
Green holds a B.S. degree in Health and Physical Education from the City College of New York, an MA in Education from Manhattan College awarded in 1962 in addition to pre-doctoral level studies at Columbia University. He was employed by various local NGOs before he first entered Parliament as MP for the La Plaine constituency in the 1995 general election.

From 1995 to February 2000, Green served as Minister of Education, Sports and Youth Affairs in the UWP administration. He was re-elected as Member of Parliament for La Plaine in 2000 and 2005. In 2006, he became deputy leader of the UWP. Following the resignation of Earl Williams he became the Political Leader. On August 8, 2008, he was sworn-in as Leader of the Opposition.

In the 2009 general election, Green had been declared the winner by two votes, but an official recount the morning after the election instead determined that he lost his seat by two votes. Overall, the UWP's representation in parliament fell from seven seats to three. Green and the UWP have challenged his loss in court, as well as the results of four other UWP candidates. He acknowledged having still been a United States citizen on Nomination Day, but renounced his U.S. nationality prior to Election Day. Most of the petitions have since been dismissed, including Green's challenge to his lost seat. On 5 August 2010, Green was appointed as a senator by the new Opposition Leader, Hector John. Green was replaced by Edison James as political leader of the UWP at its January 2012 convention; Green was elected as a trustee of the party.

Preceded by Earl Williams	Leader of the Opposition (Dominica); 8 August 2008 to 3 February 2010	Succeeded by Hector John
