= Bryson Joseph Louis =

Dominican politician (1925–2022)

Member of the House of Assembly of Dominica for Salisbury
- In office 1975–1980
- Preceded by: constituency established
- Succeeded by: Dennison John

Personal details
- Born: 27 March 1925 Salisbury, Dominica
- Died: 23 January 2022 (aged 96)
- Party: Dominica Labour Party

Bryson Joseph Louis (27 March 1925 – 23 January 2022) was a Dominican politician from the Dominica Labour Party. He was MP for Salisbury from 1975 to 1980.

== Early life ==
Louis was born in 1925 in Salisbury in Saint Joseph Parish.

== Political career ==
Louis was elected to the House of Assembly of Dominica in the 1975 general election.

== Death ==
A national day of mourning was declared by the Government of Dominica held in his memory. His funeral was held at the Church of St. Theresa in Salisbury on 11 February 2022.
