= Morne Rachette =

Village in the west coast of Dominica

Coordinates: 15.456°N 61.447°W

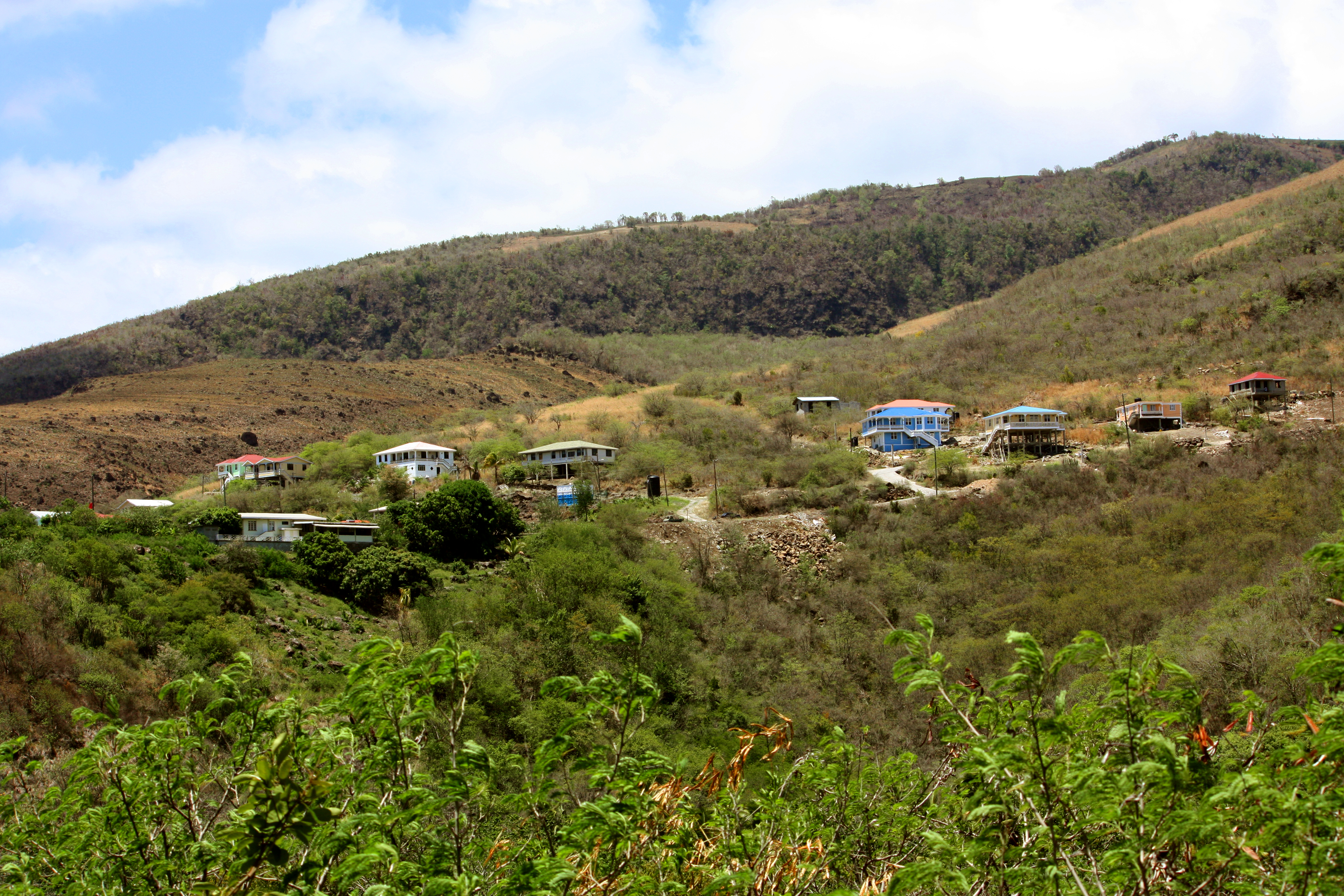
Houses in Morne Rachette, Dominica.

Morne Rachette or Morne Raquette is a village on the west coast of Dominica, in the northwest corner of Saint Joseph Parish. It is located on the slopes of Morne Jalousie, above Coulibistrie to its immediate north and Batalie Bay. The village of Salisbury is south of Morne Rachette.

The name "Rachette" derives from the French word for prickly pear cactus, which grows wild there. The Carib name for the prickly pear, bata, also once named the settlement immediately below Morne Rachette, Batali(e) Estate, and is still reflected in the name of Batalie Bay.

Morne Rachette is part of the Salisbury constituency in the Dominica House of Assembly, in which it is represented by Hector John (UWP) as of the 2009 general election. The village is locally governed by the Coulibistrie/Morne Rachette village council.
