= John Fabien =

Dominican politician

John Fabien (died 22 June 2012) was a Dominican politician.

== Biography ==
Fabien was elected to the House of Assembly in an April 2004 by-election in the Grand Bay constituency, following the death of Prime Minister Pierre Charles. He was elected on the Dominica Labour Party (DLP) ticket. He won 1,155 votes out of 1,408. He was re-elected in the 2005 election. Following re-election, Prime Minister Roosevelt Skerrit appointed him as minister for health and social security. He did not run for re-election in the 2009 election, and was succeeded by Justina Charles.

Fabien received the Sisserou Award of Honour in November 2011.

Fabien died of cancer on 22 June 2012 at Princess Margaret Hospital. He received an official funeral on 7 July.
