= Bentley Royer =

Dominican politician

Julien Bentley Royer (born 1955) is a Dominican politician in the Dominica Labour Party and a former schoolteacher. He served briefly as a senator in the Dominica House of Assembly in 2010, and has twice been an unsuccessful candidate for an elected seat.

Royer was born in Salisbury, Dominica. He graduated from the Dominica Teacher's Training College and also studied in Jamaica. Royer taught auto mechanics at the Goodwill Secondary School and has served as a board member of the Salisbury Credit Union.

Royer contested the Salisbury constituency on the Labour Party ticket in the 2009 general election. He lost to the opposition United Workers Party candidate Hector John on 18 December 2009, with 512 to John's 817 votes (38.1% to 60.7%). Royer was then appointed to serve as a senator in the House of Assembly on 4 February 2010. Royer resigned his seat to again contest the Salisbury constituency in a by-election, after John's seat was declared vacant due to the UWP boycott of the House of Assembly. Royer again lost to John on 9 July 2010, with 415 votes to John's 772 (34.6% to 64.4%).

He is married and has five children.
