= Layou (disambiguation) =

Layou may refer to:

- Layou, a town on the island of Saint Vincent in Saint Vincent and the Grenadines
- Layou River, a river in Dominica
- Layou, Dominica, a village in Dominica
