= Prime Minister Charles =

Prime Minister Charles may refer to:

- Eugenia Charles (1919–2005), 2nd prime minister of Dominica
- Pierre Charles (Dominican politician) (1954–2004), 5th prime minister of Dominica
