= 2025 in Dominica =

- Decades: 2000s; 2010s; 2020s
- See also: Other events of 2025; Timeline of Dominican history

Events in the year 2025 in Dominica.

== Incumbents ==
- President: Sylvanie Burton
- Prime Minister: Roosevelt Skerrit

== Events ==
- March 19 – Opposition parties protest against an electoral reform bill.
- March 21 – Hector John, Former MP for Salisbury, is arrested. He is released on bail on March 24.
- 1 October – An agreement allowing absolute freedom of movement for nationals of Barbados, Belize, Dominica and Saint Vincent and the Grenadines travelling between their countries comes into effect.
- 16 December – US President Donald Trump issues a proclamation imposing partial travel restrictions on Dominican nationals travelling to the United States.

== Holidays ==
- 1 January – New Year's Day
- 3–4 March – Carnival
- 18 April – Good Friday
- 21 April – Easter Monday
- 5 May – Labour Day
- 9 June – Whit Monday
- 4 August – Emancipation Day
- 3 November – Independence Day
- 4 November – Community Service Day
- 25 December – Christmas Day
- 26 December – Boxing Day

== Deaths ==
- 16 October – Edward Joseph Gilbert, 88, American-born Roman Catholic prelate, bishop of Roseau (1994–2001)

== See also ==
- 2020s
- 2025 Atlantic hurricane season
- 2025 in the Caribbean
