= Francois Barrie =

Dominican politician

Bernard "Francois" Barrie (1943 or 1944 – 3 September 2023) was a Dominican politician.

== Biography ==
Francois Barrie was born in 1943 or 1944. He worked as a teacher for 31 years. He once served on the West Indies Cricket Board.

Barrie was first elected to the House of Assembly on the United Workers' Party (UWP) ticket to represent the Salybia constituency in a by-election held on 20 December 1993. He was re-elected in the 1995 general election. Under Prime Minister Edison James, Barrie served as parliamentary secretary in the Ministry of Education and Sports from 1995 to 2000. In the 2000 general election, Barrie was defeated by Dominica Labour Party candidate Kelly Graneau.

Barried died in his home in the Kalinago Territory on 3 September 2023. He was survived by his wife, Mildred, his five biological children and his one adopted son. He was given an official funeral on 21 September.
