= Justina Charles =

Dominican politician

Member of Parliament for Grand Bay
- In office 2009–2019
- Preceded by: John Fabien
- Succeeded by: Edward Registe

Ministerial roles
- 2010-2018: Culture
- 2010-2019: Youth
- 2010-2019: Sports
- 2014-2019: Constituency Empowerment

Personal details
- Party: DLP
- Spouses: Pierre Charles (died 2004) Farley Riviere (m. 2019)
- Education: University of Technology, Jamaica

Justina Charles is a Dominican politician.

== Biography ==
Justina Charles is Roman Catholic. She is a registered nurse who trained in public health at the University of Technology in Jamaica. She previously worked at the Princess Margaret Hospital. She was married to Prime Minister Pierre Charles who died in office on 6 January 2004.

Charles was elected to represent the Grand Bay constituency in the House of Assembly in the 2009 general election. She ran with the ruling Dominica Labour Party (DLP). On 4 January 2010, Charles was sworn in as minister for culture, youth, and sports. She was re-elected in 2014. On 13 December 2014, Charles was sworn in as minister for youth, sports, culture, and constituency empowerment. In April 2018, Prime Minister Roosevelt Skerrit reshuffled his cabinet. Charles retained all of her cabinet appointments, except for as minister for culture.

On 17 February 2019, Prime Minister Skerrit announced the candidates for the DLP for the 2019 general election. Charles was not on the list of candidates. In April 2019, Charles remarried to deputy fire chief, Farley Riviere. She did not contest the 2019 election. In December 2019, following the election, Prime Minister Skerrit appointed his new cabinet.
