= People's Democratic Movement (Dominica) =

Political party in Dominica

The People's Democratic Movement was a minor political party in Dominica. The party was founded in 2007 and led by Williams Riviere, a former executive member of the Dominica Labour Party. In the 2009 elections it put forward three candidates. However, they received only 179 votes (0.49%) and failed to win a seat.
