= Lennox Linton =

Dominican politician

Leader of the Opposition
- In office 22 December 2014 – 6 December 2022
- Preceded by: Hector John
- Succeeded by: Jesma Paul

Member of Parliament for Marigot
- In office 8 December 2014 – 6 December 2022
- Preceded by: Edison James
- Succeeded by: Anthony S. Charles

Personal details
- Born: 25 November 1956 (age 69) Marigot, Dominica
- Party: United Workers' Party (Dominica)

Lennox Irving Linton (born 25 November 1956) is a Dominican politician in the United Workers' Party (UWP). He was first elected as the Representative for the Marigot constituency in the House of Assembly of Dominica on 8 December 2014. He served as Leader of the Opposition from 22 December 2014 until the 6 December 2022 snap general election and as Leader of UWP from 1 September 2013 until his resignation on 3 October 2022. He currently serves as President of the United Worker’s Party. He is a former journalist, radio presenter, party leader and corporate executive.

== Biography ==
Linton was born in Marigot, Dominica, where he attended the Marigot Government School and the Dominica Grammar School. He later studied broadcasting at the University of Texas at Austin during the 1980s.

Before entering politics Linton worked as a journalist. From 1982 to 1983 he was an announcer and news reporter at DBS Radio Dominica. He served as editor of The New Chronicle newspaper in Dominica from 1983 to 1984. In 2012, he was named The Chronicle‘s Man of the Year and was credited his “meticulous” chronicling of “the failings and manipulation of the justice system” and challenging and forcing the Integrity Commission “to live up to its statutory mandate to ensure integrity in public office.” Linton also served as senior producer at the Barbados-based Radio Service of the Caribbean News Agency, Host of MARPIN Television Show “What About”, Host of MARPIN Television News and Current Affairs Show “Good Morning Dominica” and was Manager of the Antiguan-based Observer Radio from 2004 to 2006.

Between 1997 and 2003, under the global education programme of a US fortune 500 company, Linton was trained as a frontline facilitator of various people development programs in strategic planning, goal alignment, leadership, performance management, customer service and logistics. Linton served as President of Dominica Association of Industry and Commerce and was an employee at Dominica Coconut Products and Colgate Palmolive Dominica where he served as Corporate Communications Manager, Human Resource Director, Customer Service/Logistics Director and Supply Chain Manager.

On September 1, 2013, Linton was elected Leader of the United Worker’s Party (UWP). On December 8, 2014, he was elected Parliamentary Representative for the Marigot Constituency and was sworn in as Leader of the Parliamentary Opposition later that month. Linton served as leader of UWP until his resignation on October 3, 2022. On November 6, 2022, Prime Minister Roosevelt Skerritt called a snap general election which took place on December 6, 2022. The United Worker’s Party made the decision not to contest the snap general election, opting to boycott instead. On November 22, 2022, Linton was named President of the party and Thomson Fontaine became the new leader of UWP. The December 6, 2022, snap general election resulted in an independent candidate, Anthony S. Charles, succeeding Linton as Parliamentary representative of the Marigot constituency.
