= Osborne Riviere =

Dominican politician (1932–2017)

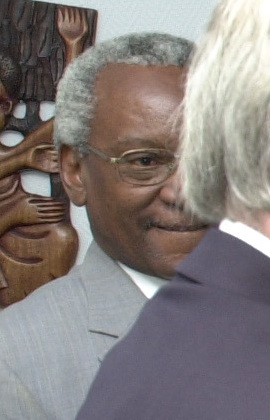

Acting Prime Minister of Dominica
- In office 6 January 2004 – 8 January 2004
- President: Nicholas Liverpool
- Preceded by: Pierre Charles
- Succeeded by: Roosevelt Skerrit

Member of Parliament for Colihaut
- In office 31 January 2000 – 12 May 2005
- Preceded by: Herbert Sabaroche
- Succeeded by: Gerard Philogene

Personal details
- Born: 1932 Dominica
- Died: 23 November 2017 (aged 84–85) Martinique

Francis Osborne Riviere (1932 – 23 November 2017) was Foreign Minister of Dominica. He became the foreign minister in 2001, replacing the prime minister, Pierre Charles. He acted as prime minister, after Pierre Charles' s death. He had previously been trade minister.

He acted as prime minister after the death of Pierre Charles until Roosevelt Skerrit assumed the prime ministership two days later. He decided to retire from active politics following the 2005 General Election. Riviere served as a member of the Dominica Labour Party. He died on 23 November 2017, aged 85.

Preceded by Pierre Charles	Prime Minister of Dominica (acting); 2004	Succeeded by Roosevelt Skerrit
