= Grand Bay (Dominica constituency) =

Electoral district in Dominica

- Constituency for the House of Assembly of Dominica
- Electorate: 3,934 (2016)

Current constituency
- Created: 1975
- Number of members: 1
- Representative: Vince Henderson (DLP)

Grand Bay is a parliamentary electoral district in Dominica. It includes the areas of Grand Bay, Bordieux and Montine. It came into effect in time for the 1975 Dominican general election. It has been represented by Vince Henderson of the Dominica Labour Party since the 2021 by-election.

== Constituency profile ==
The constituency was established prior to the 1975 Dominican general election. There was an electorate of 3,934 as of November 2016. It includes the areas of Grand Bay, Bordieux and Montine. The boundary extends from the western border of Saint Patrick Parish, from Soufriere Ridge to Micham River, along Geneva River to the sea.

== Representatives ==
This constituency has elected the following members of the House of Assembly of Dominica:

Election	Years	Member	Party	Notes
1975	24 March 1975 – 21 July 1980	Avon Casimir	DFP	
1980	21 July 1980 – 1 July 1985	Judiana Henderson	DFP	
1985	1 July 1985 – 2004	Pierre Charles	DLP	Died in office.
2004	2004 – 18 December 2009	John Fabien	DLP	
2009	18 December 2009 – 6 December 2019	Justina Charles	DLP	
2019	6 December 2019 – 1 September 2021	Edward Registe	DLP	Died in office.
2021	29 November 2021 – present	Vince Henderson	DLP	

== Election results ==
=== Elections in the 2010s ===
2019 general election: Grand Bay
Party	Candidate	Votes	%	±%
DLP	Edward Registe	1,538	87.89	
UWP	Nept Pecquette	211	12.11	
Majority		1,321	75.79	
Turnout		1,743		
DLP hold		Swing		

2014 general election: Grand Bay
Party	Candidate	Votes	%	±%
DLP	Justina Charles	1,426	81.35	
UWP	James Alexander	327	18.65	
Majority		1,099	62.69	
Turnout		1,753	43.81	
DLP hold		Swing		
