= Vince Henderson (politician) =

Dominican politician

Vince Henderson is a Dominican politician from the Dominica Labour Party.

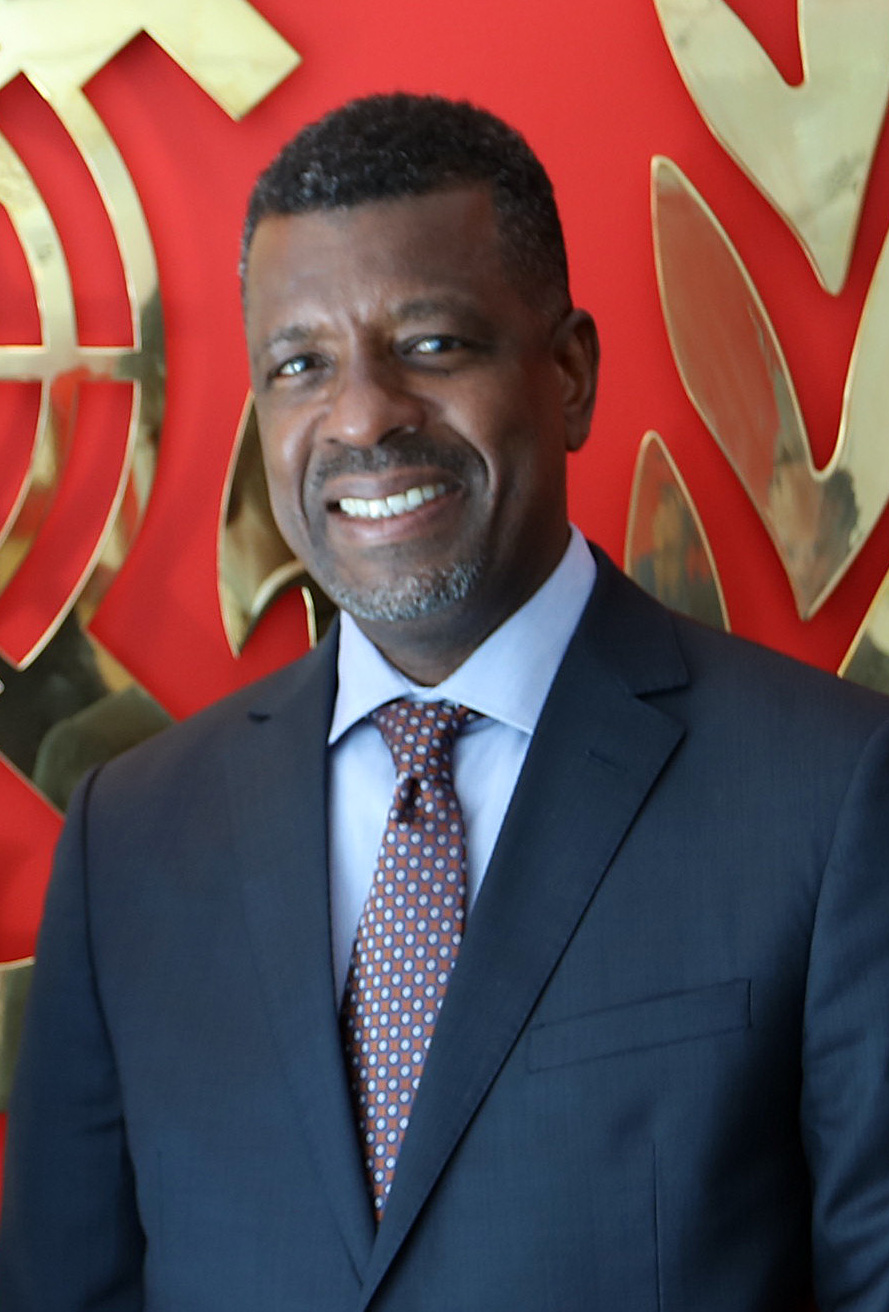
Vince Henderson

In the 2000 Dominican general election, he defeated Doreen Paul. From March 2010 to 2016, he was the Permanent Representative of Dominica to the United Nations and the United States.

In the 2021 by-election in November, Henderson was elected to represent the Grand Bay constituency in the House of Assembly. He was re-elected in the 2022 general election.

On 2 December 2021, he was sworn in as Minister for Planning, Economic Development, Climate Resilience, Sustainable Development, and Renewable Energy.

On 13 December 2022, he was sworn in as Minister of Foreign Affairs.
