= 2024 in Dominica =

- Decades: 2000s; 2010s; 2020s
- See also: Other events of 2024; Timeline of Dominican history

Events in the year 2024 in Dominica.

== Incumbents ==
- President: Sylvanie Burton
- Prime Minister: Roosevelt Skerrit

== Events ==
- 23 April - The High Court of Dominica strikes down a ban on consensual same-sex relations in the country as unconstitutional following a petition from a gay man.
- 3 August – Thea LaFond clinches Dominica's first ever Olympic medal after winning gold in the Women's triple jump at the 2024 Summer Olympics in Paris.

== Holidays ==
- 1 January - New Year's Day
- 12–13 February – Carnival
- 29 March – Good Friday
- 1 April - Easter Monday
- 1 May - May Day
- 20 May - Whit Monday
- 1 August - Emancipation Day
- 3 November – Independence Day
- 4 November – Community Service Day
- 25 December – Christmas Day
- 26 December – Boxing Day

== See also ==
- 2020s
- 2024 Atlantic hurricane season
- 2024 in the Caribbean
