= Brian George Keith Alleyne =

Dominican jurist (born 1943)

Sir Brian George Keith Alleyne KC
- Born: 28 April 1943 (age 83); Dominica
- Occupations: jurist; politician; judge
- Children: 3
- Father: Keith Alleyne

Sir Brian George Keith Alleyne KC (born 28 April 1943) is a Dominican jurist, politician and judge.

== Early life ==
Alleyne was born in Dominica to parents Hermia (née Shillingford) and Keith Alleyne. His father was the onetime attorney general of the Windward Islands and Attorney General of Grenada who was murdered in 1974. He attended the Dominica Grammar School, in Roseau, where he spent his formative years.

== Career ==
Alleyne served for 16 years in the House of Assembly of Dominica and in various capacities within the Dominican government under Eugenia Charles. He was Minister of Foreign Affairs from 1990 to 1995. He also served as Queen's Counsel (King's Counsel since 8 September 2022 when Queen Elizabeth II died) and as Attorney General of the Windward Islands.

Alleyne was elected as the political leader of Dominica Freedom Party in 1995, but lost the 1995 elections, and resigned as the political leader of the party in June 1996.

In July 1996, he was appointed a high court judge of the Eastern Caribbean Supreme Court. Beginning in 2005, he served as the Acting Chief Justice of the Eastern Caribbean Supreme Court, until retiring from the position in April 2008. He wassucceeded as Chief Justice by Hugh Anthony Rawlins. As Chief Justice, he was the supreme judicial officer of the courts of Anguilla, Antigua and Barbuda, the British Virgin Islands, Dominica, Grenada, Montserrat, Saint Kitts and Nevis, Saint Lucia, and Saint Vincent and the Grenadines.

He was knighted in 2007 as a Knight Bachelor.

Political offices
Preceded by Edison James	Leader of the Opposition (Dominica); 1995–1996	Succeeded by Rosie Douglas

== Personal life ==
Alleyne is married to Brenda Alleyne, with whom he has three children.
