= Layou, Dominica =

Village in Dominica

Coordinates: 15°23′N 61°26′W

Layou is a small village on the western coast of Dominica located near the mouth of the Layou River, after which it was named. The dominant trade in the area is fishing, though a few scattered farms are still active.

== History ==
The valley between Soltan and the sea was originally inhabited by the Kalinago, who were forced out of the area to the east to the village of Warner. The white colonists who moved into the area established three plantations in the valley, one of which was owned by a Mr. Greg and known to whites as Hillsborough estate and to the local population as Gwege, Dominican patios for his name. The plantation was located on the slopes above the village and was noted for its cacao, limes, sugar, tobacco, and slaves, which Greg cross-bred to produce specific attributes. There was a small garrison located near Hillsborough, used as a signal post. Because Dominica was disputed territory during the Seven Years' War, it was often the center of attack by the British and retaliation by the French. Forces at Layou would fire their cannon in a chained blast system stretching from Fort Shirley in the north to Fort Young in the south with each garrison notifying the next one via cannon blast.

The village was used to house the slaves who worked on the estate and housed two warehouses, one for Hillsborough and the other for the nearby Clark Hall estate. Goods were transported either by small boats on the river, or via larger boats which docked in the bayfront known as Boardlamer Gwege to be loaded and sent to Barbados or England.
