= Earl Williams (politician) =

Dominican politician

Earl Michael Williams

7th Leader of the Opposition
- In office 16 July 2007 – 30 July 2008
- Preceded by: Edison James
- Succeeded by: Ronald Green

Member of Parliament for Salisbury
- In office 28 May 1990 – 18 Dec 2009
- Succeeded by: Hector John
- Majority: 440 (65.9%)

Personal details
- Born: February 28, 1964 (age 62) Southall, England
- Party: UWP
- Children: Baggio Williams, Cherise Williams, Giovanni Williams, Amia Williams, Raja Williams
- Education: UWI
- Profession: Lawyer

Earl Michael Williams (born February 28, 1964) is a Dominican politician who was Leader of the Opposition in Dominica and political Leader of the United Workers' Party from 2007 to 2008.

== Early life and career ==
Williams was educated at the Salisbury Government School and the Community High School. He completed his A-Levels at the Sixth Form College.

Williams then served as a teacher at various schools on the island and participated in sports as a coach and player. He was an active member of the Credit Union movement not only in Salisbury but on the Island as well as the Caribbean. He served both on the Supervisory Committee and the board of the Salisbury Co-operative Credit Union as Well as Treasurer of the Dominica Credit Union League Movement and twice was one of Dominicas Delegates at the Caribbean Conference of Credit Unions.

== Political career ==
Williams was a member of the Young Freedom Movement, the youth arm of the Dominica Freedom Party which was important to the party's success. He was very active in his community, and he was rewarded for this when in the 1990 General Elections he was elected to Parliament for the Salisbury Constituency. By this time he was no longer associated with the Freedom Party and was now a member of the UWP.

The youngest ever parliamentarian on the island, he learned quickly and was a very vocal member of the opposition. In 1995 the UWP formed the government and Williams widened his margin of victory in the Salisbury (Barroui) Constituency, transforming it into a UWP stronghold. He was appointed Minister of Communications and Works and Housing. As a minister he was very instrumental in the liberalization of the telecoms market within the OECS states, by issuing a licence to telecoms provider Marpin Telecoms thereby opening up the sector for competition on the island. This decision had positive implications for the entire OECS since at that time there were plans on reforming the sector.

In the January 31, 2000, General Elections Williams comfortably retained his seat. However, the UWP did not retain enough seats in the Parliament and they again returned to the opposition. Williams then decided that he would attend the University of the West Indies to study Law. This provoked some criticism from government supporters, but generally his constituents were not angered by his decision.

In the May 5, 2005 Elections Williams again retained his seat by a wide margin, though his opponent did better than expected. The UWP put up a tough election campaign but they lost one seat in the parliament and remained in opposition. This second loss by the party evinced the need for a change of political leadership. Williams had become a very important member of the party, and he along with Julius Timothy were the main contenders for the leadership.

In October 2005, he was called to the bar and this enhanced his chances of becoming the party leader. In December 2005, Edison James stood down as political leader and Williams replaced him. His election alienated Julius Timothy, who as deputy leader under James thought he would have easily secured the leadership. This resulted in Timothy crossing the floor and joining the DLP government in September 2006.

In July 2007 Edison James resigned as leader of the opposition and Williams assumed that office.

In July 2008 Williams, in his capacity as an attorney, became embroiled in a controversy concerning a land deal.

=== Resignation ===
On July 30, 2008, in light of the controversy and in the interest of the party, Williams announced his resignation as Leader of the Opposition and as party leader of the United Workers' Party. However, he stated that after consultation with his constituents, he was "duty bound to honour the wishes of the people of Salisbury constituency" and continue as their Member of Parliament. This came days after Williams led an opposition boycott of Prime Minister Roosevelt Skerrit's budget address to highlight allegations of corruption against Skerrit.

Preceded by Edison James	Leader of the Opposition (Dominica); 16 July 2007 to 30 July 2008	Succeeded by Ronald Green
