= Saint Joseph Parish, Dominica =

Saint Joseph
- Parish
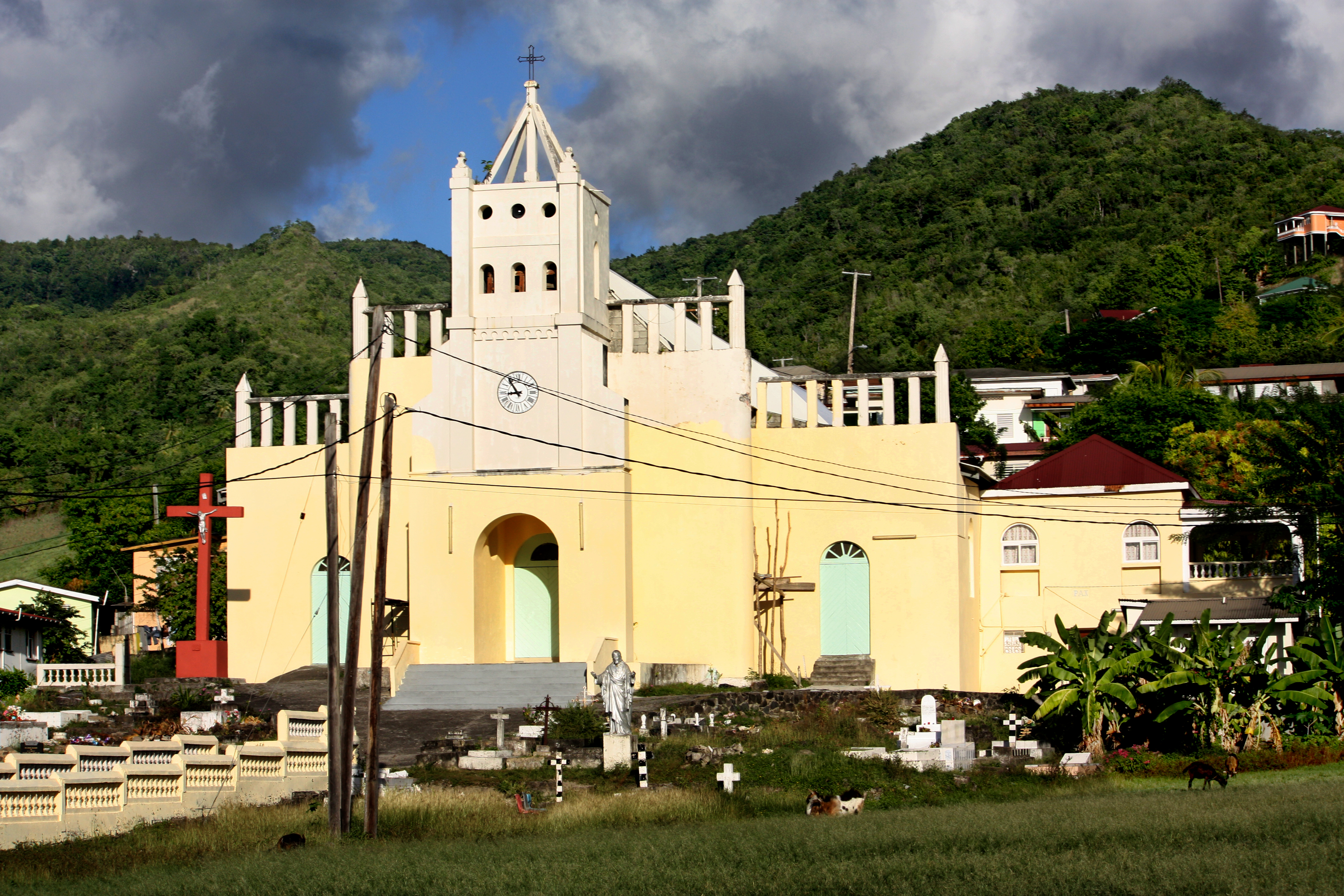
- Saint Joseph Parish Church. Saint Joseph, Dominica.

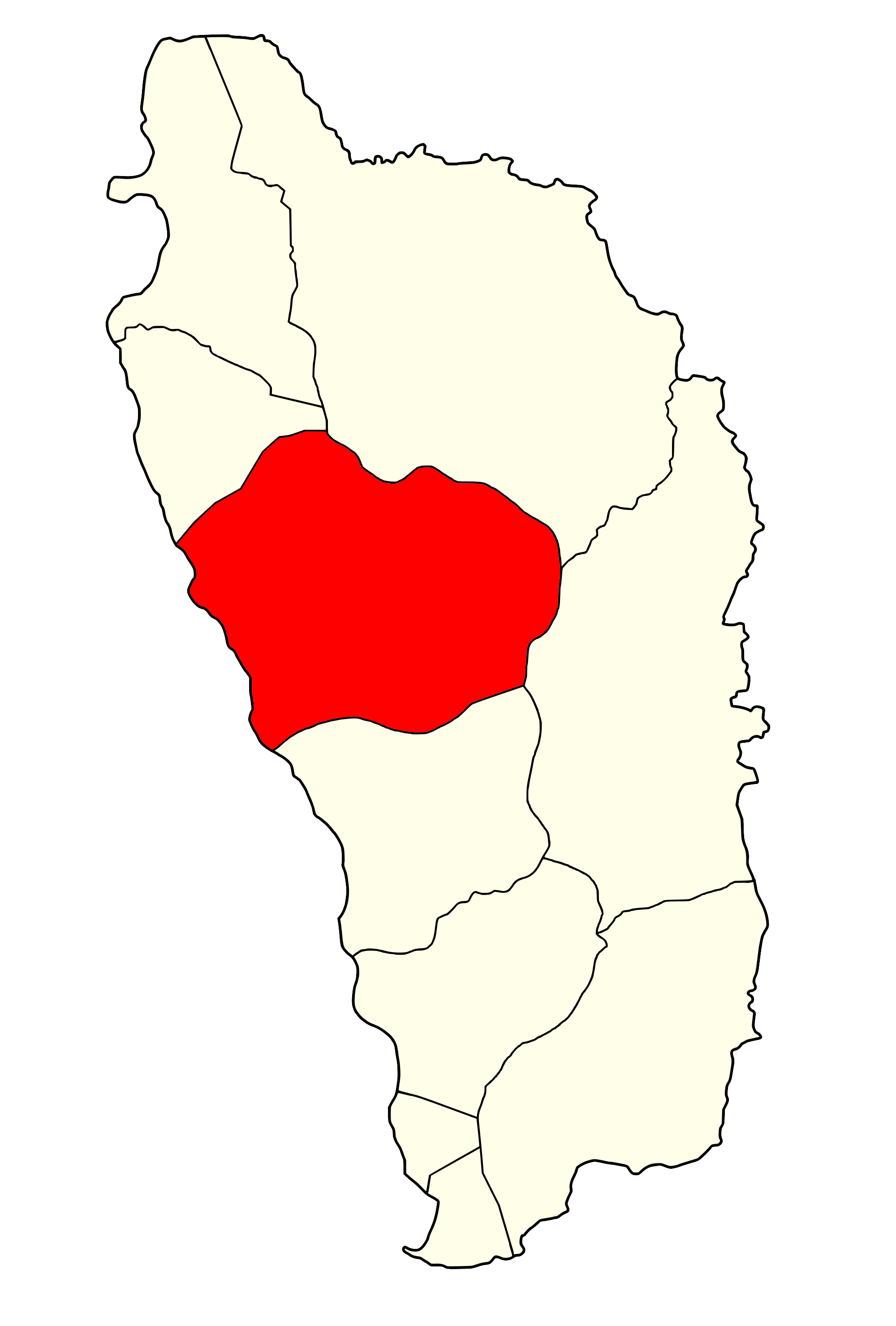
- Country: Dominica
- Capital: Saint Joseph

Area
  - Total: 121.2 km^{2} (46.8 sq mi)

Population (2011)
  - Total: 5,637
  - Density: 46.51/km^{2} (120.5/sq mi)
- Time zone: UTC-4
- ISO 3166-2: DM-06

Saint Joseph is one of Dominica's 10 administrative parishes. It is bordered by St. Peter to the north, St. Andrew to the northeast, St. David to the east, and St. Paul to the south. It has an area of 120.1 km^{2} (46.37 mi^{2}), and a population of 5,765.

Saint Joseph Village is the largest settlement in the parish; it was used as a filming location for 1988's The Seventh Sign. Most villages are located on the coast (Salisbury (also called Baroui), Coulibistrie, Mero and Morne Raquette), but another small village, Belles, is located in the interior. The parish is also home to the Layou River, the longest river on the island.
