= Rosie Douglas =

Prime Minister of Dominica in 2000

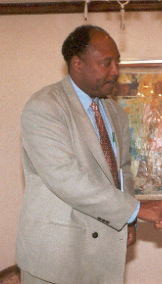

Prime Minister of Dominica
- In office 3 February 2000 – 1 October 2000
- President: Vernon Shaw
- Preceded by: Edison James
- Succeeded by: Pierre Charles

Personal details
- Born: Roosevelt Bernard Douglas; 15 October 1941 British Leeward Islands
- Died: 1 October 2000 (aged 58) Portsmouth, Dominica
- Party: Dominica Labour Party
- Other political affiliations: Progressive-Conservative (Canada)
- Education: Ontario Agricultural College; Sir George Williams University; McGill University

Roosevelt Bernard "Rosie" Douglas (15 October 1941 – 1 October 2000) was a politician and human rights activist from Dominica. He served as Prime Minister of Dominica from February 2000 until his death in office eight months later.

== Early life ==
Rosie Douglas was the son of the late Robert Bernard Douglas, a wealthy businessman, coconut farmer, and conservative politician who named his boys after world statesmen (he had brothers named Eisenhower, Attlee, and Adenauer). He was schooled in Dominica's capital, Roseau, before being accepted to study agriculture at the Ontario Agricultural College.

== In Canada ==
=== University ===
After growing frustrated with the bureaucratic delays in obtaining his visa to enter Canada, he made a phone call to then Canadian Prime Minister, John Diefenbaker. Mr. Diefenbaker was able to assist Douglas, aged 18 at the time, and sent local MP Bruce Robinson to collect him at the airport. Douglas became involved in politics as a member of the young Conservative Party of Canada, under the guidance of the right honourable John Diefenbaker. Upon completing his studies in agriculture, he moved to Montreal where he enrolled in political science at Sir George Williams University.

=== Student politics ===
While attending Sir George Williams, Douglas, who worked as a teachers assistant in the Political Science Department, became President of the Conservative Student Union becoming friends with Canadian political leaders including Pierre Trudeau and René Lévesque. Douglas used his platform within the Tory Party to advocate on behalf of Caribbean women who came to Canada under the domestic scheme, better housing conditions for blacks living in substandard conditions, particularly in North Preston, Nova Scotia, equal employment opportunities for blacks in Canada, and addressing racism in Canada as part of the Tories' national platform. However, Douglas left the conservatives when national student leader Joe Clark refused to address the issue of racism on a national level. His political views also changed radically when he went to live on Indian reserves in Quebec, and visited Nova Scotia's black communities in the 1960s. The impoverished conditions of black people there affected him to the point he decided "there and then" that he would devote his life to improving the lot of black people around the world. By the late 1960s, after hearing Martin Luther King Jr. speak at the Massey Lectures at the University of Toronto, Douglas had become an active supporter of the civil rights movement taking place in the United States, befriending the likes of King and Stokely Carmichael.

Douglas, along with community leaders like Vincentian cricketer and political activist Alphonso Theodore Roberts, Nova Scotian human rights activist Rocky Jones, and Antiguan political activist Tim Hector, organized The Montreal Congress of Black Writers. This group featured renowned black economists, scholars, and activists from around the world, including Guyanese Pan-Africanist Walter Rodney, Trinidadian Marxist C. L. R. James, American civil rights leader Angela Davis, and Black Panther Party leader Bobby Seale.

=== Sir George Williams affair and imprisonment ===
When black students began to protest racism at Sir George Williams University, Douglas had by then moved on to his master's program at McGill University. Meanwhile, he had developed strong leadership credentials in the Tory party, served as president of the Association of British West Indian Students, and was serving as Vice President of the Verdun Cricket Club. He emerged as the media-savvy leader of what has come to be known as the Sir George Williams affair of 1969. He, along with future Canadian Senator Anne Cools and others led an anti-racism sit-in at Sir George Williams University, Montreal, which resulted in the peaceful occupation of the computer centre as negotiations took place between the administration and the student leadership. However, once an agreement was reached, the riot police infiltrated the occupation, escalating the matter into a violent conflict and fire, resulting in mayhem and destruction of the computer centre. Douglas, maintained that the fire was set by agent provocateurs, but was identified as the ring leader and charged with obstructing the use of public property. He served 18 months in prison before being declared a national security risk by then Solicitor General Warren Almond setting the stage for his deportation in hand cuffs and leg irons, vowing that he would only return as "Prime Minister of my own country".

While in prison, Douglas wrote an extensive report on prison reform in Canada, set up literacy classes for prisoners, and wrote the book Chains or Change. According to Douglas, "I learned a lot about injustices in Canadian society when I went to jail...The truth is that I didn't become committed to the fight for equality in Dominica. I became committed to the movement in Canada." Upon his release from prison Douglas, who had embarked on a cross Canada black unity tour building solidarity with native Canadians, was placed under RCMP surveillance as revealed by the Royal Commission of Inquiry into Certain Activities of the RCMP and in 1976 the Solicitor General Warren Allmand signed an order declaring Douglas a dangerous risk to Canada's national security, forcing his deportation.

== Return to Dominica and international activities ==
After his deportation, Douglas pursued a broad range of political activity on the world stage getting involved with the Socialist International, building relations with Cuba, The People's Republic of China, and the Soviet Union securing hundreds of scholarships for Dominican students. Through his Dominica/China Friendship Association, Douglas led Dominica's first diplomatic mission to China in 1984 along with then Portsmouth mayor Renwick Jean Pierre securing a commitment from the Chinese Government of US$1 million for projects for the town of Portsmouth. In a press statement in 1984 Douglas wrote: "Attempts to build relations exclusively with Taiwan as is the case with the Government of the Commonwealth of Dominica is shortsighted, reactionary, and not in keeping with current political and economic relations on the world".

Douglas also became the Executive Chairman of the Libyan-based World Mathaba, a group that trained and advised guerrilla resistance movements worldwide. In this capacity he persuaded Colonel Gaddafi to begin negotiations with the British for the trial of suspects in the Lockerbie bombing, and supported anti-apartheid movements such as the African National Congress (ANC), which provided critical support to the toppling of apartheid and the freeing of Nelson Mandela. In Douglas's view, there was nothing extremist about his activities, centred as they were on defeating despots and freeing Nelson Mandela, who was steadfastly supported by the Gaddafi regime. “All Dominicans supported the freedom of Mandela,” he says. “And the freedom of Mandela wasn't a cakewalk on a Sunday morning - it was a revolutionary struggle in which people fought, died, and killed.” Douglas, in his capacity as Executive Chairman of the World Mathaba, was also part of a negotiating team seeking an Iraqi withdrawal from Kuwait to avert the Gulf War. Speaking at the anti-sanctions forum in New York on 20 January 1996, Douglas stated: "I visited Iraq in 1990. In fact, left Baghdad two days before the war really began, on probably the last flight out. They had first imposed sanctions in August 1990. So even at that time, children were already dying because of a lack of medicines. I visited hospitals and saw it. And that was six months into the sanctions and before the war actually began. So you can imagine how after five years, with a tightening of those sanctions, the children of Iraq are suffering. All children have a right to a decent life, all children have the right to benefit from the fruits and resources of their country. What is good for the children of America is also good for the children of Iraq, Iran, Cuba, Vietnam, China all over the world."

== National politics ==
Back at home, in his native Dominica, Douglas launched the Popular independence Committee which agitated for full political independence from Great Britain, helping to pave the way for Dominica to become an independent nation in 1978. After serving as a senator in the post-independence government, Douglas won the election for his Paix Bouche constituency, becoming an MP in 1985. He served as the International Secretary of the Dominica Labour Party, eventually becoming leader in 1992 after the death of his brother Michael Douglas. In a 1992 by-election, Rosie Douglas was elected to the House of Assembly to represent the Portsmouth constituency. He was re-elected in 1995 and 2000.

=== Prime minister ===
During his political career, Douglas appealed to the cause of socialist radical reformers. At the parliamentary elections on 31 January 2000, he led the DLP to victory against the governing United Workers' Party of Prime Minister Edison James. He formed a coalition with the moderate Dominica Freedom Party and began office on 3 February 2000.

True to his promise, in May 2000 Douglas returned to Canada on an official state visit as the Prime Minister of Dominica, holding bilateral talks with his Canadian counterparts. He was quoted in the Canadian press at the time as stating: "Yes, I feel the sacrifice was worth it," referring to his time in jail and deportation from Canada: "I feel exonerated."

As Prime Minister Douglas set out on an ambitious agenda of establishing transforming Dominica into a high-income economy. He signed a US$300 million MOU with the Chinese for the building of an international airport, sought to establish a special relationship with the European Union with Dominica being sandwiched between two Departments of France, built stronger ties with the British Labour Party of Tony Blair the French Socialist Party of Lionel Jospin, the German Social Democratic Party of Gerhard Schroder and other social democratic parties in Scandinavia, Italy and Portugal. Douglas also sought increased development spending from Canada, Swedish assistance in transforming Dominica into an information technology centre, foreign direct investment in eco-tourism and medical tourism, and increased economic cooperation with Africa. He appealed directly to African Americans to invest in Dominica, and for the Congressional Black Caucus to lobby for the Caribbean in Washington in same way American Jews did for Israel.

After only eight months in office, Douglas was found dead on 1 October 2000 in his house in Portsmouth. He had returned the day before from state visits to Australia, Taiwan, Canada and Libya for the reconvening for the World Mathaba. Among the leaders addressing the conference in Tripoli in addition to Douglas were President of Zimbabwe Robert Mugabe, Burkina Faso President Blaise Compaore, Namibia President Sam Nujoma, Chad President Idriss Deby, Mali President Alpha Oumar Konaré, Gambia President Yahya Jammeh, Senegal President Abdoulaye Wade, Nation of Islam Leader Louis Farrakhan, leader of the Sandinistian Liberation Front Daniel Ortega, and Colonel Muammar Gaddafi. Douglas, as the only Caribbean Mathaba leader, sought greater connections between Caribbean, African, and African-American groups to confront global political and economic challenges.

Pierre Charles was named as his successor, but died in office in January 2004, paving the way for Roosevelt Skerrit to assume the position as Prime Minister of Dominica.

== Legacy ==
The Dominican parliament passed a motion on 14 October 2025 to posthumously grant Douglas and Pierre Charles with the nation's highest honour, the Dominica Award of Honour on 3 November, Independence Day.

== See also ==
- History of Dominica

Government offices
Preceded by Brian Alleyne	Leader of the Opposition; 1996–3 February 2000	Succeeded by Edison James
Preceded by Edison James	Prime Minister of Dominica; 3 February 2000–1 October 2000	Succeeded by Pierre Charles
