= Saint Joseph, Dominica =

Human settlement in Dominica

Coordinates: 15°24′25″N 61°25′30″W

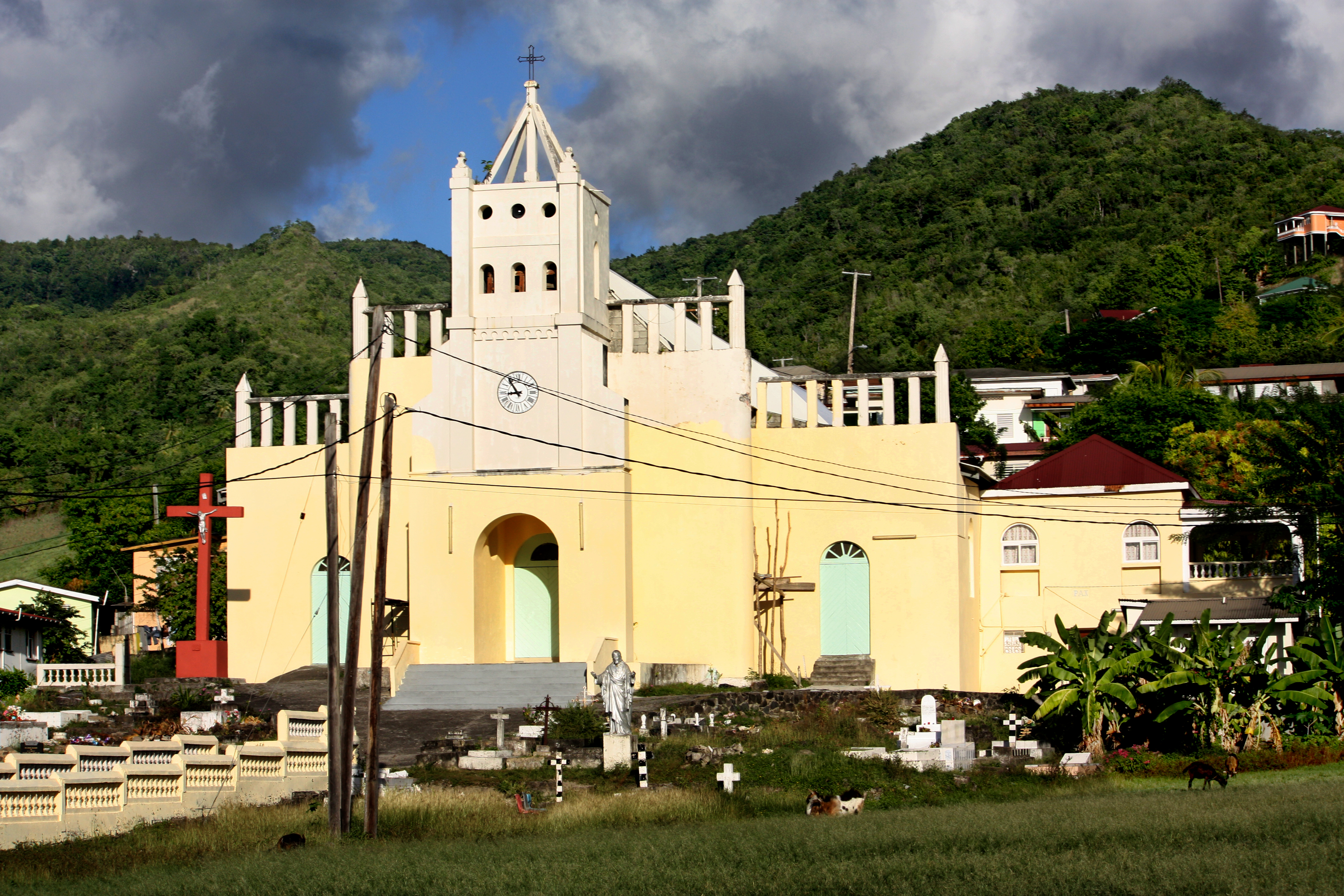
Saint Joseph Parish Church, in the village of Saint Joseph.

Saint Joseph is the chief settlement of Dominica's St. Joseph Parish. Its population is 2,029.

== Notable people ==
- Adis King, politician
