= 2009 Dominican general election =

- 18 December 2009

21 of the 30 seats in the House of Assembly 11 seats needed for a majority
- Registered: 66,923
- Turnout: 55.11% (▼3.98pp)
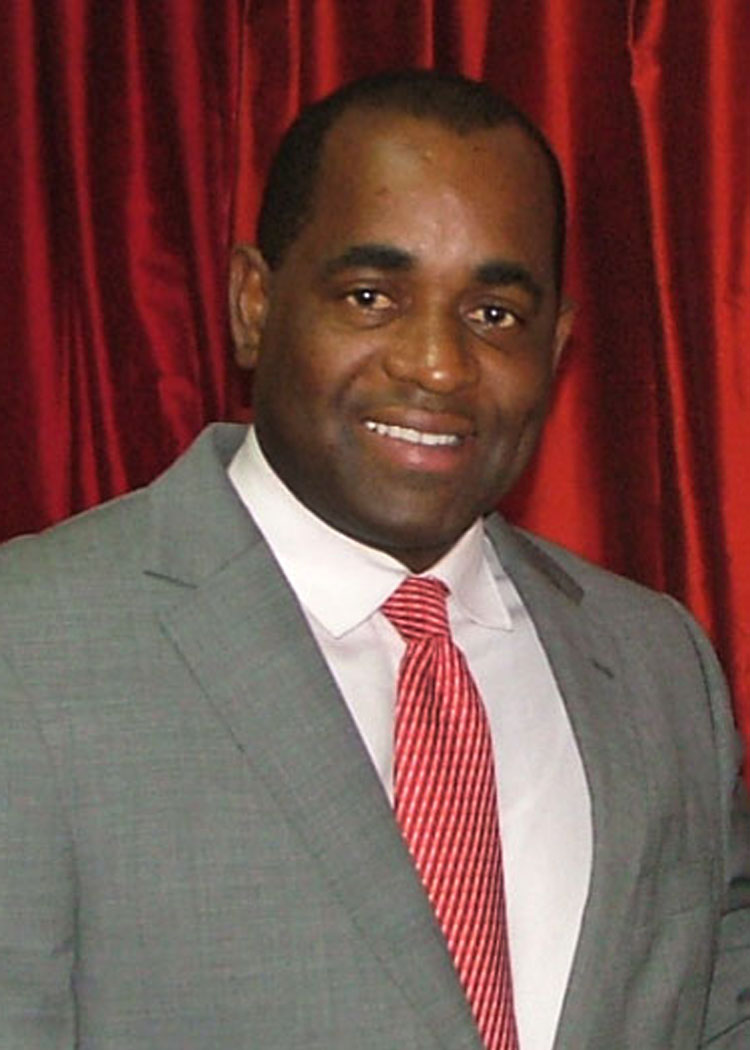
	First party	Second party
		UWP
Leader	Roosevelt Skerrit	Ronald Green
Party	DLP	UWP
Last election	52.07%, 12 seats	43.60%, 8 seats
Seats won	18	3
Seat change	▲6	▼5
Popular vote	22,187	12,684
Percentage	61.13%	34.95%
Swing	▲9.06pp	▼8.65pp
- Results by constituency
Prime Minister before election
Roosevelt Skerrit
DLP
Elected Prime Minister
Roosevelt Skerrit
DLP

General elections were held in Dominica on 18 December 2009, to elect the 21 Representatives of the House of Assembly. The incumbent Dominica Labour Party increased its majority to 18 of 21 seats, winning a third term.

== Results ==
Party	Votes	%	Seats	+/–
Dominica Labour Party	22,187	61.13	18	+6
United Workers' Party	12,684	34.95	3	–5
Dominica Freedom Party	870	2.40	0	0
People's Democratic Movement	180	0.50	0	New
Dominica Progressive Party	19	0.05	0	0
Independents	354	0.98	0	–1
Total	36,294	100.00	21	0
Valid votes	36,294	98.40		
Invalid/blank votes	589	1.60		
Total votes	36,883	100.00		
Registered voters/turnout	66,923	55.11		
Source: Caribbean Elections

=== By constituency ===
Castle Bruce	Candidate	Party	Votes	%
1534 ballots counted 39 ballots rejected	Johnson Drigo†	Dominica Labour Party	841	54.8
1534 ballots counted 39 ballots rejected	Bernard Wiltshire	United Workers' Party	686	44.7
1534 ballots counted 39 ballots rejected	Jacqueline Laurent Theodore	Independent	7	0.5
Colihaut	Candidate	Party	Votes	%
846 ballots counted 13 ballots rejected	Ronald Toulon††	Dominica Labour Party	632	74.7
846 ballots counted 13 ballots rejected	Herbert (Sabee) Sabaroche	Dominica Freedom Party	211	24.9
846 ballots counted 13 ballots rejected	Delroy Sebastian	Dominica Progressive Party	3	0.4
Cottage	Candidate	Party	Votes	%
1331 ballots counted 10 ballots rejected	Reginald Victor Austrie††	Dominica Labour Party	969	85.7
1331 ballots counted 10 ballots rejected	William Emmanuel Riviere	People's Democratic Movement	162	14.3
Grand Bay	Candidate	Party	Votes	%
1497 ballots counted 37 ballots rejected	Justina Charles†	Dominica Labour Party	1350	90.2
1497 ballots counted 37 ballots rejected	Leanthia Pacquette Lewis	United Workers' Party	119	7.9
1497 ballots counted 37 ballots rejected	Harian Martin Henry	Dominica Freedom Party	19	1.3
1497 ballots counted 37 ballots rejected	Lyndon Peters	Dominica Progressive Party	9	0.6
La Plaine	Candidate	Party	Votes	%
1446 ballots counted 13 ballots rejected	Petter Saint-Jean	Dominica Labour Party	724	50.1
1446 ballots counted 13 ballots rejected	Ron Green††	United Workers' Party	722	49.9
Mahaut	Candidate	Party	Votes	%
3649 ballots counted 36 ballots rejected	Rayburn John Blackmoore††	Dominica Labour Party	2136	58.5
3649 ballots counted 36 ballots rejected	Ronald (Ronnie) Isidore	United Workers' Party	1457	39.9
3649 ballots counted 36 ballots rejected	Johnson (Bosso) Boston	Dominica Freedom Party	56	15.3
Marigot	Candidate	Party	Votes	%
1063 ballots counted 8 ballots rejected	Edison Chenfil James††	United Workers' Party	835	78.6
1063 ballots counted 8 ballots rejected	Dayton Baptiste	Dominica Labour Party	228	21.4
Morne Jaune/Riviere Cyrique	Candidate	Party	Votes	%
1071 ballots counted 15 ballots rejected	Ivor Stephenson	Dominica Labour Party	528	48.8
1071 ballots counted 15 ballots rejected	Abraham Browne††	United Workers' Party	523	48.8
1071 ballots counted 15 ballots rejected	Benjamin Pascal	Dominica Freedom Party	20	1.9
Paix Bouche	Candidate	Party	Votes	%
1308 ballots counted 82 ballots rejected	Matthew Joseph Walter††	Dominica Labour Party	1157	88.5
1308 ballots counted 82 ballots rejected	John C. Bruno	United Workers' Party	151	11.5
Petite Savanne	Candidate	Party	Votes	%
1511 ballots counted 12 ballots rejected	Kenneth Melchoir Darroux†	Dominica Labour Party	1243	82.3
1511 ballots counted 12 ballots rejected	Samuel Raphael	Independent	268	17.7
Portsmouth	Candidate	Party	Votes	%
1434 ballots counted 14 ballots rejected	Ian Douglas††	Dominica Labour Party	1251	87.2
1434 ballots counted 14 ballots rejected	Murphy Wallace	Dominica Freedom Party	91	6.3
1434 ballots counted 14 ballots rejected	Errol Moir Hill	Independent	61	4.3
1434 ballots counted 14 ballots rejected	Albert Cecil Severin	Independent	18	1.3
1434 ballots counted 14 ballots rejected	Julian Stephen Brewster	People's Democratic Movement	13	0.9
Roseau Central	Candidate	Party	Votes	%
1786 ballots counted 54 ballots rejected	Norris "Prevo" Prevost††	United Workers' Party	839	47.0
1786 ballots counted 54 ballots rejected	Alvin "Aloe" Bernard	Dominica Labour Party	836	47.0
1786 ballots counted 54 ballots rejected	Judith Pestaina	Dominica Freedom Party	109	6.1
1786 ballots counted 54 ballots rejected	Leonard "Pappy" Baptiste	Democratic Progressive Party	2	0.1
Roseau North	Candidate	Party	Votes	%
3291 ballots counted 82 ballots rejected	Julius C. Timothy††	Dominica Labour Party	1655	50.3
3291 ballots counted 82 ballots rejected	Daniel Andrew Lugay	United Workers' Party	1538	46.7
3291 ballots counted 82 ballots rejected	Henry Babs Dyer	Dominica Freedom Party	95	2.9
3291 ballots counted 82 ballots rejected	Michael Wright	Dominica Progressive Party	3	0.1
Roseau South	Candidate	Party	Votes	%
3355 ballots counted 22 ballots rejected	Ambrose George††	Dominica Labour Party	2049	61.1
3355 ballots counted 22 ballots rejected	Bobby A. C. Frederick	United Workers' Party	1130	33.7
3355 ballots counted 22 ballots rejected	Oliver A. St. John	Dominica Freedom Party	176	5.2
Roseau Valley	Candidate	Party	Votes	%
1614 ballots counted 14 ballots rejected	John Collin McIntyre	Dominica Labour Party	936	58.0
1614 ballots counted 14 ballots rejected	Norris Charles††	United Workers' Party	658	40.8
1614 ballots counted 14 ballots rejected	Michael Anthony Astaphan	Dominica Freedom Party	20	1.2
Salisbury	Candidate	Party	Votes	%
1345 ballots counted 25 ballots rejected	Hector "Spags" John†	United Workers' Party	817	60.7
1345 ballots counted 25 ballots rejected	Julien B. "Tolo" Royer	Dominica Labour Party	512	38.1
1345 ballots counted 25 ballots rejected	Nettisha Walsh	Dominica Freedom Party	16	1.2
Salybia	Candidate	Party	Votes	%
1701 ballots counted 18 ballots rejected	Ashton Graneau†	Dominica Labour Party	1013	59.6
1701 ballots counted 18 ballots rejected	Claudius Sanford	United Workers' Party	684	40.2
1701 ballots counted 18 ballots rejected	Christabelle Auguiste	Independent	4	0.2
St. Joseph	Candidate	Party	Votes	%
1936 ballots counted 24 ballots rejected	Kelver Dwight Darroux†	Dominica Labour Party	1138	58.8
1936 ballots counted 24 ballots rejected	Henry John Abraham	United Workers' Party	788	40.7
1936 ballots counted 24 ballots rejected	Marcella Boatswain	Dominica Progressive Party	5	0.3
1936 ballots counted 24 ballots rejected	Roland Mitchel	People's Democratic Movement	5	0.3
Soufrière	Candidate	Party	Votes	%
2044 ballots counted 35 ballots rejected	Sam Edward Martin†	Dominica Labour Party	1214	59.4
2044 ballots counted 35 ballots rejected	Glen Etienne	United Workers' Party	777	38.0
2044 ballots counted 35 ballots rejected	Felita Paul Thomas	Dominica Freedom Party	53	25.9
Vieille Case	Candidate	Party	Votes	%
1189 ballots counted 15 ballots rejected	Roosevelt Skerrit††	Dominica Labour Party	1041	87.6
1189 ballots counted 15 ballots rejected	Maynard (MJ) Joseph	United Workers' Party	148	12.4
Wesley	Candidate	Party	Votes	%
1543 ballots counted 21 ballots rejected	Gloria Marilyn Shillingford	Dominica Labour Party	809	52.4
1543 ballots counted 21 ballots rejected	Ezekiel Bazil†	United Workers' Party	734	47.6
Source: Electoral Office
