= COVID-19 pandemic in Dominica =

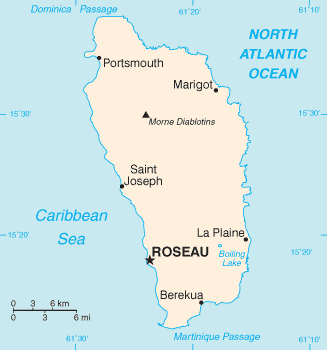
- Disease: COVID-19
- Pathogen: SARS-CoV-2
- Location: Dominica
- First outbreak: Wuhan, China
- Arrival date: 22 March 2020 (6 years, 6 months, 1 week and 5 days)
- Confirmed cases: 197 (8 July)
- Active cases: 5 (8 July)
- Recovered: 192 (8 July)
- Deaths: 1 (17 August)

Government website
- dominica.gov.dm/corona

The COVID-19 pandemic in Dominica is part of the ongoing worldwide pandemic of coronavirus disease 2019 (COVID-19) caused by severe acute respiratory syndrome coronavirus 2 (SARS-CoV-2). The virus was confirmed to have reached Dominica on 22 March 2020.

== Background ==
On 12 January 2020, the World Health Organization (WHO) confirmed that a novel coronavirus was the cause of a respiratory illness in a cluster of people in Wuhan City, Hubei Province, China, which was reported to the WHO on 31 December 2019.

The case fatality ratio for COVID-19 has been much lower than SARS of 2003, but the transmission has been significantly greater, with a significant total death toll.

== Timeline ==
Cases

Deaths

=== March 2020 ===
- On 22 March, the country's first case of COVID-19 was announced, a 54-year-old man who returned from the United Kingdom.

=== September 2020 ===
- On 8 September, it was announced that Dominica has confirmed two more active cases of COVID-19, bringing the total active cases to six.
- On 17 September, it was announced that Dominica has confirmed one more active cases of COVID-19, bringing the total to four.
- As of 19 September, total number of cases in Dominica was 24, with 6 active cases. 18 cases have recovered from Covid.

=== October to December 2020 ===
- As of 4 October, total number of cases in Dominica was 31, with 7 active cases. 24 cases have recovered from Covid.
- As of 6 October, total number of cases in Dominica was 32, with 8 active cases. 24 cases have recovered from Covid.
- As of 20 October, total number of cases in Dominica was 33, with 4 active cases and 29 cases have recovered from Covid.
- As of 21 October, total number of cases in Dominica was 35, with 6 active cases and 29 cases have recovered from Covid.
- As of 29 October, total number of cases in Dominica was 42, with 9 active cases and 33 recoveries.
- As of 31 October, total number of cases in Dominica was 50, with 17 active cases and 33 cases have recovered.
- As of 6 November, total number of cases in Dominica was 58, with 25 active cases and 33 cases have recovered.
- As of 11 November, total number of cases in Dominica was 68, with 27 active cases and 41 cases that have recovered.
- As of 18 November, total number of cases was 72, with 17 active cases and 55 cases that have recovered.
- As of 21 November, the Government of Dominica announced the total number of cases was 77, with 14 active cases and 63 cases that have recovered.
- As of 2 December, the Government of Dominica announced the total number of cases was 85, with 13 active cases and 72 cases that have recovered.
- As of 13 December, the Government of Dominica announced the total number of cases was 88, with 5 active cases and 83 recoveries.
- As of 21 December, the Government of Dominica announced the total number of cases was 96, with 9 active cases and 87 recoveries.

=== January to March 2021 ===
- As of 6 January 2021, the Government of Dominica announced the total number of cases was 105, with 8 active cases and 97 cases that have recovered.
- As of 11 January 2021, the Government of Dominica announced the total number of cases was 109, with 8 active cases and 101 recovered to date.
- As of 19 January 2021, total number of cases in Dominica was 110, with 8 active cases and 102 recovered to date.
- As of 21 January 2021, total number of cases in Dominica was 113, with 9 active cases and 104 recovered to date.
- As of 25 January 2021, total number of cases in Dominica was 113, with 8 active cases and 105 recovered to date.
- As of 28 January 2021, total number of cases in Dominica was 117, with 11 active cases and 106 have cured.
- As of 7 February 2021, total number of cases in Dominica was 121, with 11 active cases and 110 have recovered.
- As of 16 February 2021, total number of cases in Dominica was 134, with 13 active cases and 121 recoveries.
- As of 23 February 2021, total number of cases in Dominica was 141, with 15 active cases and 126 cures.
- As of 6 March 2021, total number of cases in Dominica was 144, with 14 active cases and 130 have recovered.
- As of 22 March 2021, total number of cases in Dominica was 156, with 15 active cases and 141 recoveries.
- As of 29 March 2021, total number of cases in Dominica was 161, with 8 active cases and 153 cures.

=== April to June 2021 ===
- As of 1 April 2021, total number of cases in Dominica was 164, with 7 active cases and 157 recovered to date.
- As of 4 April 2021, total number of cases in Dominica was 165, with 6 active cases and 159 recovered to date.
- As of 1 May 2021, total number of cases in Dominica was 174, with 2 active cases and 172 recoveries.
- As of 8 May 2021, total number of cases in Dominica was 175, with no active case and 175 recoveries.
- As of 13 May 2021, total number of cases in Dominica was 178, with 2 active cases and 176 recoveries.
- As of 25 May 2021, total number of cases in Dominica was 184, with 8 active cases and 176 have cured.
- As of 17 June 2021, total number of cases in Dominica was 191, with 2 active cases and 189 have recovered to date.

=== July to September 2021 ===
- As of 13 July 2021, total number of cases in Dominica was 199, with 5 active cases and 194 have been cured.
- As of 30 August 2021, total number of cases in Dominica was 1638, with 638 active cases, 996 recoveries and 4 deaths.
- As of 10 September 2021, total number of cases in Dominica was 2280, with 417 active cases, 1857 recoveries and 6 fatalities.
- As of 22 September 2021, total number of cases in Dominica was 3134, with 548 active cases, 2575 cures and 11 deaths.
- As of 28 September 2021, total number of cases in Dominica was 3293, with 598 active cases, 2680 cures and 15 deaths.

=== October to December 2021 ===
- As of 9 October 2021, total number of cases in Dominica was 4006, with 443 active cases, 3537 have been cured and 26 deaths.
- As of 19 November 2021, total number of cases in Dominica was 5589, with 416 active cases, 5138 have been cured and 35 deaths.
- As of 29 December 2021, total number of cases in Dominica was 6520, with 303 active cases, 6173 have been cured and 44 deaths.

=== January to March 2022 ===
- As of 4 January 2022, total number of cases in Dominica was 7073, with 482 active cases, 6544 have been cured and 47 deaths.
- As of 8 January 2022, total number of cases was 7299, with 649 active cases, 6603 have been recovered and 47 deaths.
- As of 21 January 2022, total number of cases was 8421, with 766 active cases, 7606 cures and 49 deaths.
- As of 25 January 2022, total number of cases was 8567, with 735 active cases, 7533 have been cured and 49 fatal cases.
- As of 4 February 2022, total number of cases was 9621, with 946 active cases, 8624 recoveries and 51 deaths.
- As of 11 February 2022, total number of cases was 10414, with 1107 active cases, 9254 have been cured and 53 fatal cases.
- As of 21 February 2022, total number of cases was 10801, with 797 active cases, 9947 have been cured and 57 deaths.
- As of 25 February 2022, total number of cases was 11016, with 396 active cases, 10563 have been recovered and 57 deaths.
- As of 3 March 2022, total number of cases was 11148, with 206 active cases, 10881 have been cured and 61 deaths.
- As of 14 March 2022, total number of cases was 11529, with 325 active cases, 11142 have been cured and 62 deaths.
- As of 18 March 2022, total number of cases was 11643, with 251 active cases, 11330 have been cured and 62 fatalities.

=== April to June 2022 ===
- As of 7 April 2022, total number of cases was 11953, with 133 active cases, 11757 have been cured and 63 deaths.
- As of 25 April 2022, total number of cases was 12011, with 22 active cases, 11926 have been cured and 63 deaths.
- As of 1 May 2022, total number of cases was 12161, with 73 active cases, 12025 have been cured and 63 have died.
- As of 11 May 2022, total number of cases was 12685, with 299 active cases, 12323 have recovered and 63 deaths.
- As of 26 May 2022, total number of cases was 14194, with 344 active cases, 13775 have been cured and 65 fatal cases.
- As of 13 June 2022, total number of cases was 14638, with 287 active cases, 14284 have been cured and 67 deaths.
- As of 23 June 2022, total number of cases was 14781, with 264 active cases, 14450 recoveries and 67 deaths.

=== July to December 2022 ===
- As of 8 July 2022, total number of cases was 14852 in Dominica, with 231 active cases, 14553 recoveries and 68 deaths.
- As of 18 July 2022, total number of cases was 14852, with 230 active cases, 14554 recoveries and 68 deaths.
- As of 26 August 2022, total number of cases was 14852, with 230 active cases, 14554 recoveries and 68 deaths. There wasn't any change in the Covid numbers reported by Dominica since the beginning of this quarter.

=== January 2023 ===
- As of 30 January 2023, total number of cases was 15760, with 13 active cases, 15673 recoveries and 74 fatal cases.

== See also ==
- COVID-19 pandemic in North America
- COVID-19 pandemic by country and territory
- Caribbean Public Health Agency
- 2020 in the Caribbean
- Influx of disease in the Caribbean
- HIV/AIDS in Latin America
- 2013–2014 chikungunya outbreak
- 2009 swine flu pandemic
- 2019–2020 dengue fever epidemic
