= History of Dominica =

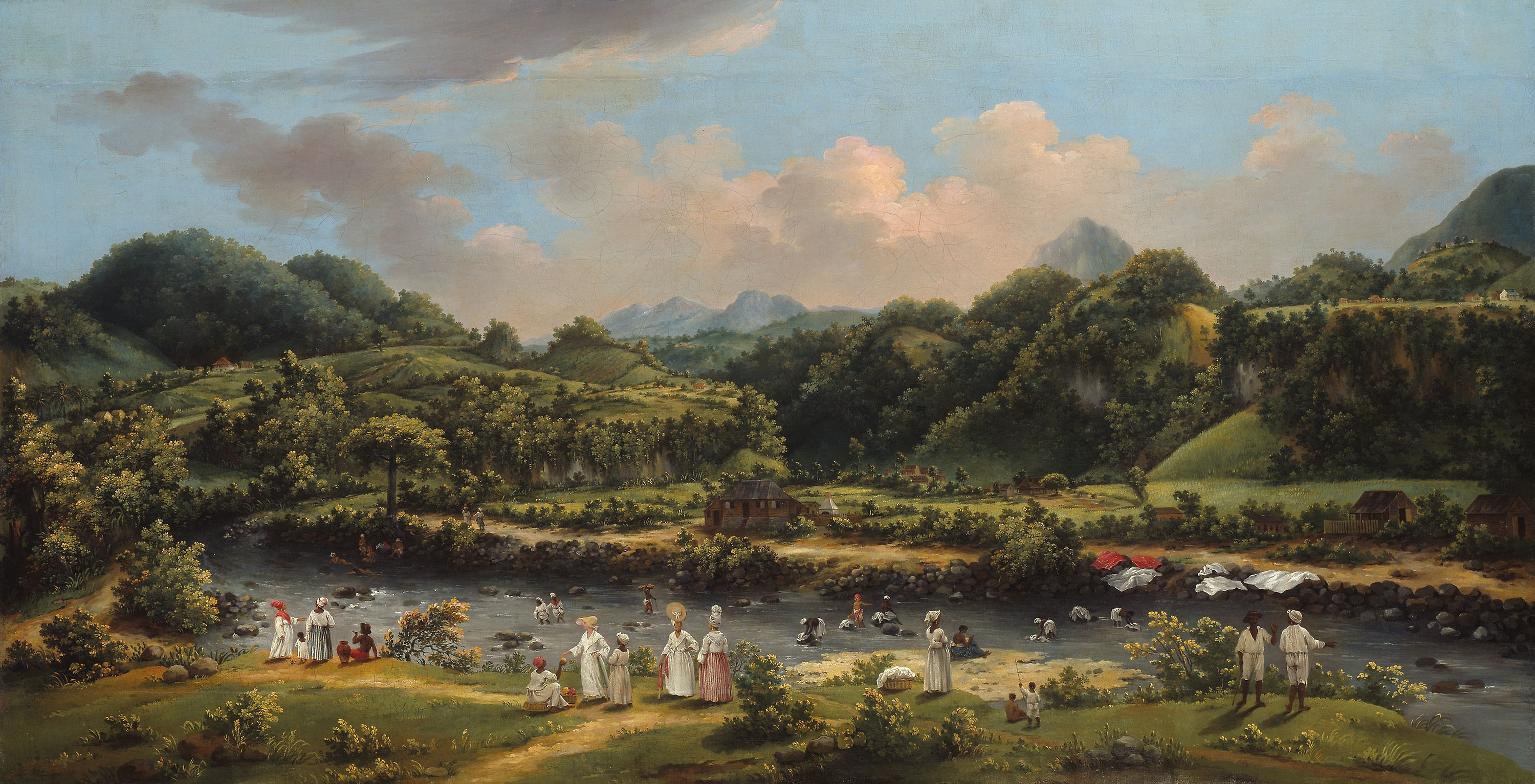
1770s painting of the Roseau River by Agostino Brunias

The first written records in the history of Dominica began in November 1493, when Christopher Columbus spotted the island. Prior to European contact, Dominica was inhabited by the Arawak. Dominica was a French colony from 1715 until the end of the Seven Years' War in 1763, and then became a British colony from 1763 to 1978. It became an independent nation in 1978.

== Pre-colonial ==
The Arawak were guided to Dominica, and other islands of the Caribbean, by the South Equatorial Current from the waters of the Orinoco River. These descendants of the early Taínos were overthrown by the Kalinago tribe of the Caribs. The Caribs, who settled here in the 14th century, called the island Wai‘tu kubuli, which means "Tall is her body."

== Early European contacts ==
Christopher Columbus named the island after the day of the week on which he spotted it – a Sunday ('Dominica' in Latin) – which fell on 3 November 1493 on his second voyage. Daunted by fierce resistance from the Caribs and discouraged by the absence of gold, the Spanish did not settle the island. Many of the remaining Carib people live in Dominica's Carib Territory, a 3,700-acre (15 km^{2}) district on Dominica's east coast. In 1632, the French Compagnie des Îles de l'Amérique claimed Dominica along with all the other 'Petite Antilles' but no settlement was attempted. Between 1642 and 1650 a French missionary Raymond Breton became the first regular European visitor to the island. In 1660 the French and English agreed that both Dominica and St. Vincent should not be settled, but instead left to the Caribs as neutral territory. Dominica was officially neutral for the next century, but the attraction of its resources remained; rival expeditions of English and French foresters were harvesting timber by the start of the 18th century.

== French colony: 1715–1763 ==
Spain had little to no success in colonising Dominica and in 1690, the French established their first permanent settlements in Dominica. French woodcutters from Martinique and Guadeloupe begin to set up timber camps to supply the French islands with wood and gradually become permanent settlers. They brought the first enslaved people from West Africa to Dominica. In 1715, a revolt of "poor white" smallholders in the north of Martinique, known as La Gaoulé, caused an exodus of them to southern Dominica. They set up smallholdings. Meanwhile, French families and others from Guadeloupe settled in the north.

In 1727, the first French commander, M. Le Grand, took charge of the island with a basic French government; Dominica formally became a colony of France, and the island was divided into districts or "quarters". Already installed in Martinique and Guadeloupe and cultivating sugar cane, the French gradually developed plantations in Dominica for coffee. They imported African slaves over the next 70 years to fill the labour demands. In 1761, during the Seven Years' War, a British expeditionary force under Andrew Rollo, 5th Lord Rollo captured and occupied Dominica along with several other French Caribbean colonies.

== British colony: 1763–1978 ==
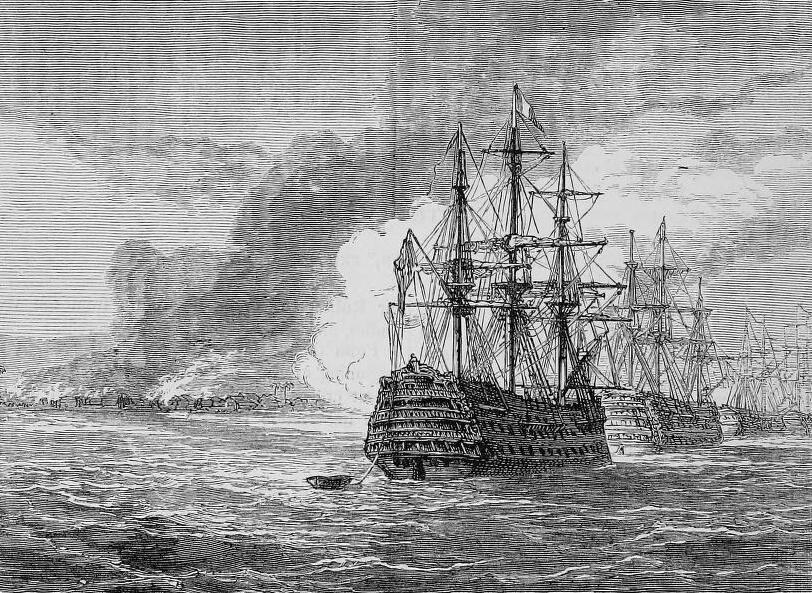
1873 illustration of the French burning Roseau in 1805

As part of the 1763 Treaty of Paris that ended the Seven Years' War, the island was ceded to Britain. In the same year, Dominica's new colonial authorities established a legislative assembly which exclusively represented the colony's white population. During the American Revolutionary War, the French recaptured Dominica in 1778 with the active cooperation of local inhabitants, who were largely Francophone. However, the 1783 Treaty of Paris, which ended the war, returned the island to Britain. French invasions in 1795 and 1805 ended in failure, though on 22 February 1805 the French Navy burned much of Roseau to the ground.

In 1831, reflecting a liberalisation of government racial attitudes, the Brown Privilege Bill conferred political and social rights on free nonwhites. Three Blacks were elected to the legislative assembly the following year. The abolition of slavery in 1834 enabled Dominica by 1838 to become the only British West Indian colony to have a Black-controlled legislature in the 19th century. Most Black legislators were landowners or merchants who held economic and social views diametrically opposed to the interests of the colony's comparatively small white planter class. Reacting to a perceived threat, the planters lobbied for more direct rule from London. In 1865, after much agitation and tension, the Colonial Office replaced the elective assembly with one composed of one-half elected members and one-half appointed. The elected legislators were outmaneuvered on numerous occasions by planters allied with colonial administrators. In 1871, Dominica became part of the Leeward Island Federation. The power of the Black population progressively eroded. Crown Colony government was re-established in 1896.

Following World War I, an upsurge of political consciousness throughout the Caribbean led to the formation of the representative government association. Marshaling public frustration with the lack of a voice in the governing of Dominica, this group won one-third of the popularly elected seats of the legislative assembly in 1924 and one-half in 1936. Shortly thereafter, Dominica was transferred from the Leeward Island Administration and was governed as part of the Windwards until 1958, when it joined the short-lived West Indies Federation. In 1961, a Dominica Labor Party government led by Edward Oliver LeBlanc was elected. After the federation dissolved, Dominica became an associated state of the United Kingdom on 27 February 1967, and formally took responsibility for its internal affairs. LeBlanc retired in 1974 and was replaced by Patrick John who became the islands' first Prime Minister.

== Independence: 1978 to present day ==
On 3 November 1978, the Commonwealth of Dominica was granted independence by the United Kingdom.

In August 1979, Hurricane David, packing winds of 150 mph (240 km/h), struck the island with devastating force. Forty-two people were killed and 75% of the islanders' homes were destroyed or severely damaged.

Independence did little to solve problems stemming from centuries of economic underdevelopment, and in mid-1979, political discontent led to the formation of an interim government, led by Oliver Seraphin. It was replaced after the 1980 elections by a government led by the Dominica Freedom Party under Prime Minister Eugenia Charles, the Caribbean's first female prime minister. Within a year of her inauguration she survived two unsuccessful coups and in October 1983, as chairperson of the Organisation of East Caribbean States, endorsed the US Invasion of Grenada.

Chronic economic problems were compounded by the severe impact of hurricanes in 1979 and in 1980. By the end of the 1980s, the economy had made a healthy recovery, which weakened in the 1990s due to a decrease in banana prices.

In 1995 the government was defeated in elections by the United Workers Party of Edison James. James became prime minister, serving until the February 2000 elections, when the Dominica United Workers Party (DUWP) was defeated by the Dominica Labour Party (DLP), led by Rosie Douglas. He was a former socialist activist, and many feared that his approach to politics might be impractical. However, these were somewhat quieted when he formed a coalition with the more conservative Dominica Freedom Party. Douglas died suddenly after only eight months in office, on 1 October 2000, and was replaced by Pierre Charles, also of the DLP. In 2003, Nicholas Liverpool was elected and sworn in as president, succeeding Vernon Shaw. On 6 January 2004, Prime Minister Pierre Charles, who had been suffering from heart problems since 2003, died. He became the second consecutive prime minister of Dominica to die in office of a heart attack. The foreign minister, Osborne Riviere immediately became prime minister, but the education minister, Roosevelt Skerrit succeeded him as prime minister and became the new leader of the Dominica Labour Party. Elections were held on 5 May 2005, with the ruling coalition maintaining power.

In 2017, Hurricane Maria struck Dominica and was the most powerful and devastating hurricane ever recorded in Dominica.

President Charles Angelo Savarin was re-elected in 2018.

In the 2019 general elections The Dominica Labour Party (DLP) was given another overwhelming mandate – for a record fifth consecutive five-year term. The party's charismatic but often maligned leader, Roosevelt Skerrit, will serve a new five-year term as the Prime Minister of Dominica.

== See also ==
- British colonisation of the Americas
- French colonisation of the Americas
- History of the Americas
- History of the British West Indies
- History of North America
- History of the Caribbean
- List of prime ministers of Dominica
- Politics of Dominica
- Spanish colonisation of the Americas
