= Hector John =

Dominican politician

Leader of the Opposition
- In office 19 July 2010 – 8 December 2014
- Preceded by: Ronald Green
- Succeeded by: Lennox Linton

Member of Parliament for Salisbury, Dominica
- In office 18 December 2009 – 6 December 2022
- Preceded by: Earl Williams (politician)
- Succeeded by: Jesma Paul

Personal details
- Born: 22 October 1970 (age 55) Salisbury, Dominica
- Party: United Workers' Party
- Education: Monroe College

Hector John (born 22 October 1970) is a Dominican politician in the United Workers' Party (UWP). He was the Leader of the Opposition, from 2010 to 2014 and was the youngest ever to hold that position. He was first elected as a Representative to the House of Assembly in 2009.

== Biography ==
John was born in Salisbury, Dominica. He graduated from the St. Joseph Campus of Dominica Grammar School, and then earned a B.A. in Information Technology from Monroe College in New York.

Hector worked in the banana industry for over 16 years, as a statistics officer and information technology assistant. He was active in the Salisbury community as a leader of several organizations, including the Salisbury Catholic Youth Movement and the Salisbury Improvement Committee.

John entered politics as a candidate for the Salisbury parliamentary constituency in the 2009 general election, on the ticket of the opposition United Workers' Party. John won against the Labour Party candidate Bentley Royer on 18 December 2009, with 817 to 512 votes (60.7% to 38.1%); the overall results left the UWP with only three of the twenty-one seats.

John subsequently joined the UWP boycott of the House of Assembly, in protest against alleged election irregularities. After John did not attend three consecutive sessions, Speaker of the House Alix Boyd Knights declared his and another UWP seat vacant in April, and a by-election was scheduled for 9 July 2010. John again ran and won against Royer for the Salisbury constituency in the by-election, with 772 votes to Royer's 415 (64.4% to 34.6%).

John was sworn in as Leader of the Opposition on 19 July 2010.

Preceded by Ronald Green	Leader of the Opposition (Dominica); 19 July 2010 to present	Succeeded by incumbent
