= Pierre Charles (Dominican politician) =

Dominican politician

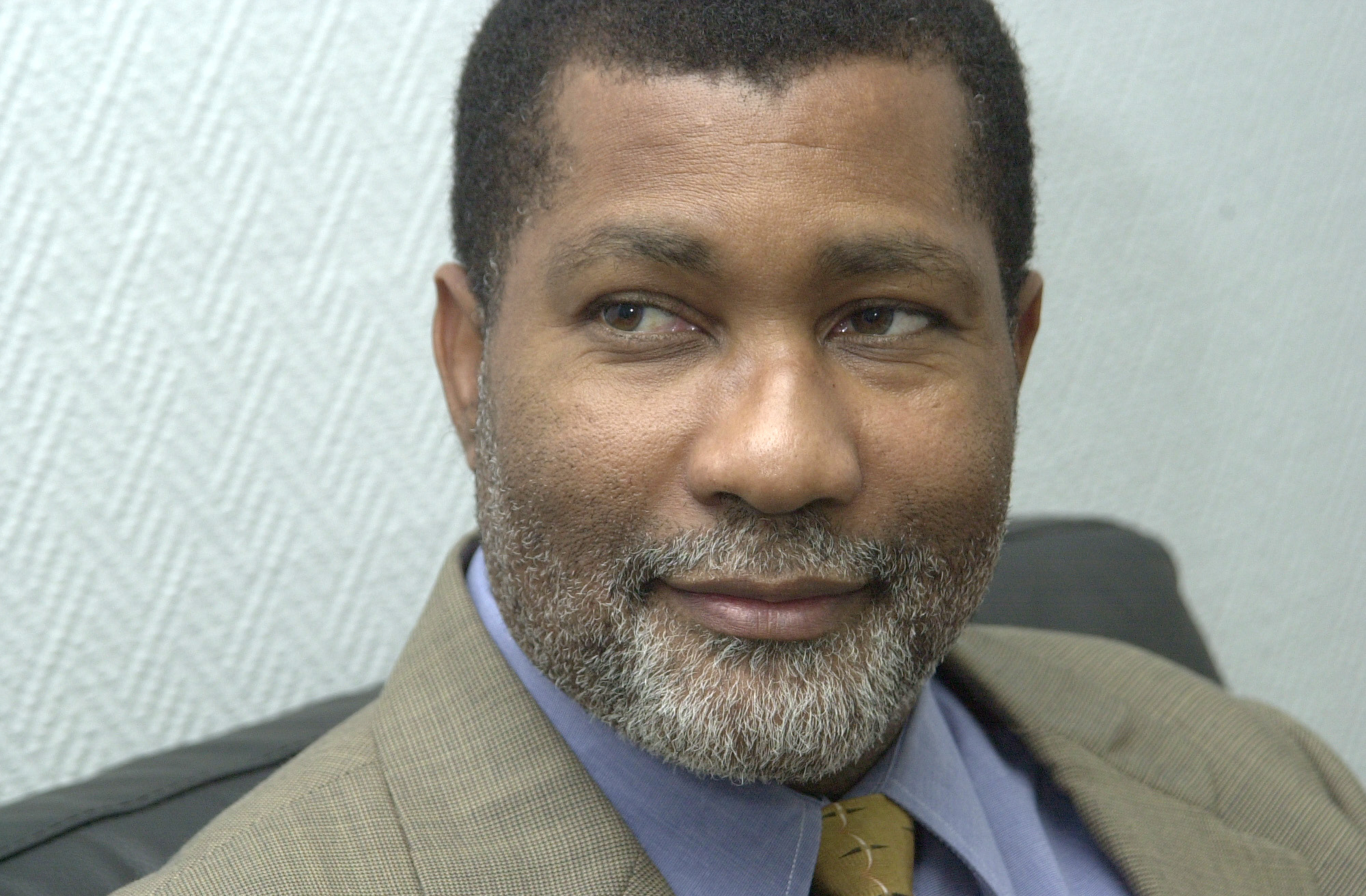
- Charles in 2003

5th Prime Minister of Dominica
- In office 3 October 2000 – 6 January 2004
- President: Vernon Shaw; Nicholas Liverpool
- Preceded by: Roosevelt Douglas
- Succeeded by: Osborne Riviere (acting)

Member of Parliament for Grand Bay
- In office 11 March 1985 – 6 January 2004
- Succeeded by: John Fabien

Personal details
- Born: June 30, 1954 Grand Bay, British Windward Islands
- Died: January 6, 2004 (aged 49) Roseau, Dominica
- Party: DLP
- Spouse: Justina Charles
- Children: Amilcar T. Charles, Faiza A. Charles, Camilo C. Charles, McClaren M. Simon

Pierre Charles (30 June 1954 – 6 January 2004) was a Dominican politician who served as Prime Minister of Dominica from 2000 to his death in 2004. At the time of his death, he was also serving as Member of Parliament for Grand Bay since 1985.

== Biography ==
Charles was born in Grand Bay in Saint Patrick parish. He began his high-school education at the Dominica Grammar School and completed it at the St. Mary's Academy before pursuing studies at the local teachers' college. He served as a teacher and community organizer before entering elective office.

He became ill in February 2003, and had angioplasty surgery. Concerns about his health led to calls for him to step down. However, he continued to serve as prime minister until his death, which occurred during a medical leave of absence. Osborne Riviere acted as Prime Minister in Charles' stead. However, upon return from his medical leave of absence, Charles succumbed at the age of 49 to a heart attack while being driven home from a Cabinet meeting.

== Political ascendancy ==
In 1979, at the age of 25, Charles was appointed a Senator in Dominica’s Parliament. In the general elections of 1985, he contested the Grand Bay seat, and won, though his Dominica Labour Party (DLP) – led by Rosie Douglas’s brother Michael Douglas – lost to the incumbent Dominica Freedom Party (DFP) under the leadership of the formidable Dame Eugenia Charles (no relation), Dominica's longest serving head of government at the time. For the next 15 years, Pierre Charles remained in that position, as irremovable from Grand Bay as Rosie Douglas was from Portsmouth.

When the DLP (in coalition with the DFP) came to power in 2000 under the leadership of Rosie Douglas, Charles was appointed Minister of Public Works and Communications. During the eight months of Douglas’s rule, Charles was often called upon to function as the acting Prime Minister. When Douglas suddenly died in October 2000, Charles was elevated as Douglas’s successor. He continued in office until his sudden death in January 2004.

Charles was an Honorary Member of The International Raoul Wallenberg Foundation.

== Legacy ==
The Dominican parliament passed a motion on 14 October 2025 to posthumously grant Charles and Rosie Douglas with the nation's highest honour, the Dominica Award of Honour on 3 November, Independence Day.

Government offices
Preceded by Rosie Douglas	Prime Minister of Dominica; October 2000–January 2004	Succeeded by Roosevelt Skerrit
