= Marigot, Dominica =

Marigot
- Village
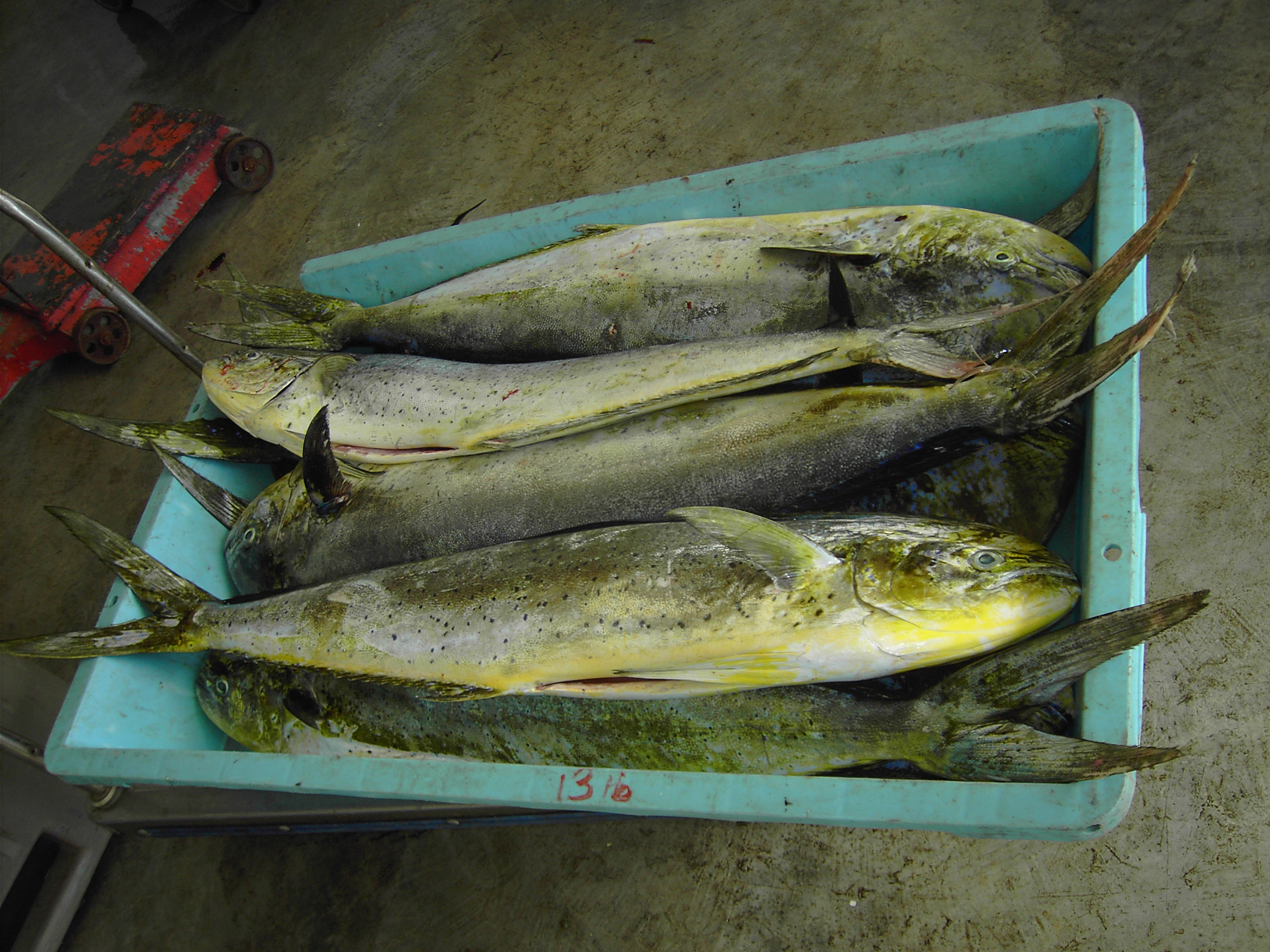
- Coryphaena hippurus at Marigot fishing port

- Location on Dominica
- Coordinates: 15°32′N 61°18′W
- Country: Dominica
- Parish: Saint Andrew

Population (2001)
  - Total: 2,676
- Time zone: UTC-4 (AST)

Marigot is the largest settlement of Saint Andrew Parish in northeastern Dominica. The village has a population of 2,676 people, and is home to a Fisheries Complex as well as the island's main airport. Kokoy is the main language spoken in the village, a dialect of Antiguan and Barbudan Creole brought to the village by Antiguan and Montserratian settlers.

It is the birthplace of Wills Stratmore Stevens, a local Educationist and B.O Robinson, a former education officer. Along with Doctor Watts and local politician Edison James, (former Prime Minister) and cricket umpire Billy Doctrove. Marigot served as the leading community in Dominica at one point, with its people serving in all aspects of government and local community development. Former police Commissioner O N Philip and Customs Comptroller Victoria Watty are also from the village of Marigot. Marigot can boast of being the leader in job creation, agriculture and entrepreneurship. Marigot is also the home of former Government Senator Allan Jerry E Samuel, the youngest member to serve in parliament in the entire Caribbean region. It is also home to current leader of the Opposition Lennox Linton.

== History ==
The village of Marigot was developed around the plantation of John Weir, deputy provost Marshall in Dominica, who brought laborers to Dominica from Antiguan and some Leeward Islands. The present day village extends from Pagua Bay to Melville Hall. There are several small districts within the village, including one called Weirs after the former plantation owner.

The former Melville Hall Estate was owned by Robert Melville, Governor of the ceded Islands, or Tobago, Dominica, Grenada, and St. Vincent, which were the British Empire's first Caribbean acquisition after a century. Melville was a member of the noble Melville family, he was related to the Earls of Leven and Earls of Melville. All of Mellville's purchased land had originally been granted to someone else. John Weir had been granted a number of plots of land in the area, including 230 acres in February 1768, that later appeared in the appraisement of Melville Hall Estate in May 1769. By 1770, Robert Melville's Melville Hall Estate consisted of 1027 acres and was valued at £33,190 16s 0d (equivalent to approximately £25–£35 million today when measured against average earnings). This included an enslaved population of 128, stock, and crops. The Estate was inherited by his cousin's son, Robert Whyte Melville, who was the owner until his death, after which his brother, John Whyte Melville, inherited the estate. In 1832 William Greig registered 135 enslaved persons, as lessee of the Melville Hall estate. Following emancipation, William Greig was awarded £997 19s 10d in compensation as owner of 50 enslaved people that he had placed on the Melville Hall estate. John Whyte Melville was awarded £2781 14s 10d in compensation as the owner of 131 enslaved people.

Like Wesley, Marigot has a strong Methodist influence due to the introduction of free labourers into the estates of the north-east from Antigua, Montserrat, and other Leeward Islands to replant the sugar estates. The people of the Wesley-Marigot area speak an English-lexicon basilectal Creole, referred to as Kokoy.

== Climate ==
Climate data for Douglas–Charles Airport (1991–2020)
Month	Jan	Feb	Mar	Apr	May	Jun	Jul	Aug	Sep	Oct	Nov	Dec	Year
Record high °C (°F)	30.9 (87.6)	31.9 (89.4)	32.3 (90.1)	33.1 (91.6)	33.0 (91.4)	33.6 (92.5)	33.2 (91.8)	34.3 (93.7)	34.3 (93.7)	33.9 (93.0)	32.8 (91.0)	32.0 (89.6)	34.3 (93.7)
Mean daily maximum °C (°F)	28.5 (83.3)	28.5 (83.3)	28.8 (83.8)	29.5 (85.1)	30.1 (86.2)	30.5 (86.9)	30.7 (87.3)	31.0 (87.8)	31.1 (88.0)	30.8 (87.4)	29.9 (85.8)	29.0 (84.2)	29.8 (85.6)
Daily mean °C (°F)	25.3 (77.5)	25.3 (77.5)	25.5 (77.9)	26.2 (79.2)	27.1 (80.8)	27.7 (81.9)	27.8 (82.0)	27.8 (82.0)	27.5 (81.5)	27.2 (81.0)	26.6 (79.9)	25.8 (78.4)	26.6 (79.9)
Mean daily minimum °C (°F)	22.3 (72.1)	22.1 (71.8)	22.1 (71.8)	22.9 (73.2)	24.0 (75.2)	25.0 (77.0)	24.9 (76.8)	24.7 (76.5)	24.0 (75.2)	23.7 (74.7)	23.3 (73.9)	22.7 (72.9)	23.4 (74.1)
Record low °C (°F)	18.0 (64.4)	17.7 (63.9)	17.2 (63.0)	17.7 (63.9)	20.6 (69.1)	20.4 (68.7)	20.7 (69.3)	20.9 (69.6)	20.0 (68.0)	17.2 (63.0)	18.8 (65.8)	16.9 (62.4)	16.9 (62.4)
Average precipitation mm (inches)	142.6 (5.61)	85.1 (3.35)	110.5 (4.35)	179.3 (7.06)	203.3 (8.00)	189.9 (7.48)	235.3 (9.26)	267.9 (10.55)	298.4 (11.75)	322.5 (12.70)	347.1 (13.67)	206.9 (8.15)	2,569.2 (101.15)
Average precipitation days (≥ 1 mm)	19.0	14.8	14.4	16.2	16.5	17.3	20.8	21.7	19.0	21.6	20.6	19.8	221.7
Mean monthly sunshine hours	213.4	215.4	243.6	243.2	250.6	226.2	237.2	252.9	221.5	221.6	198.1	197.3	2,721
Source: NOAA
