= Edison James =

Dominican politician

Edison Chenfil James
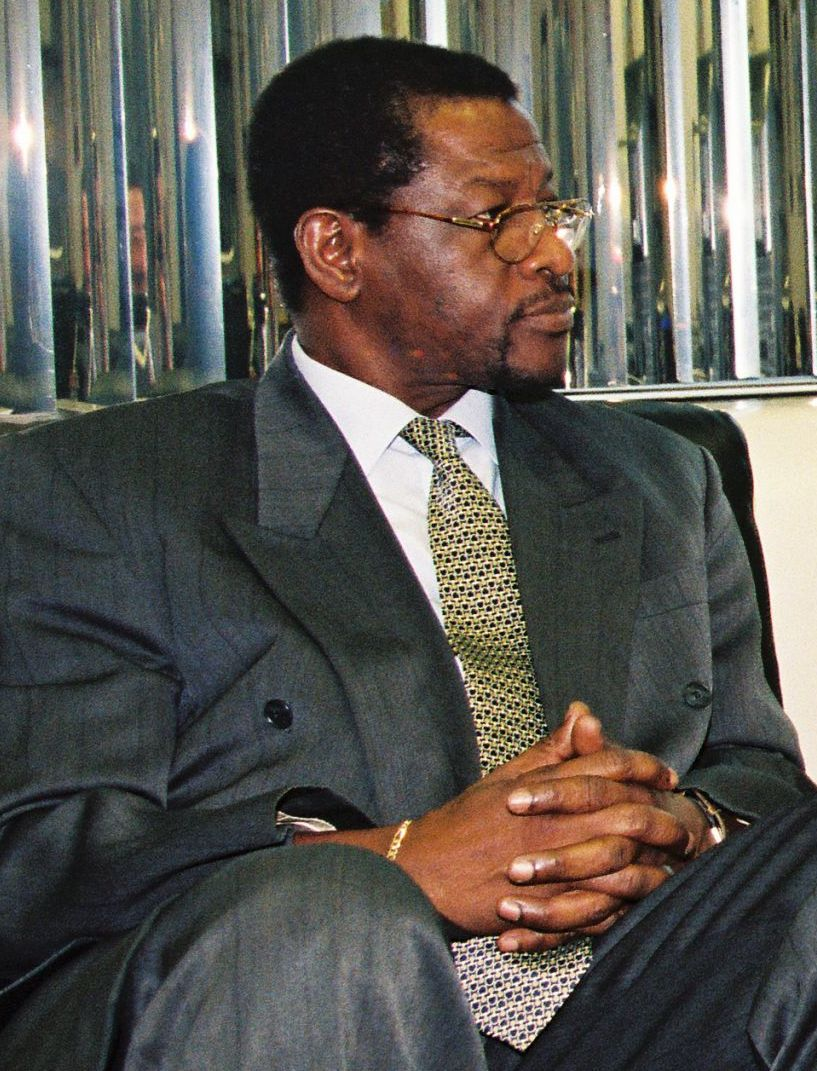
- James in 1998

3rd Prime Minister of Dominica
- In office 14 June 1995 – 3 February 2000
- President: Crispin Sorhaindo; Vernon Shaw
- Deputy: Julius Timothy
- Preceded by: Eugenia Charles
- Succeeded by: Roosevelt Douglas

Member of Parliament for Marigot
- In office 28 May 1990 – 8 December 2014
- Preceded by: Pattison A.S. Stevens
- Succeeded by: Lennox Linton
- Majority: 825 (65.6%)

Personal details
- Born: 18 October 1943 (age 82) Marigot, Dominica
- Party: United Workers' Party
- Education: University of East London; University of Reading

Edison Chenfil James (born 18 October 1943) is a Dominican politician who was the prime minister of Dominica from June 14, 1995, to February 3, 2000, as well as the member of parliament for the Marigot constituency from 1990.

He graduated from the Dominica Grammar School. He has a BSc degree in botany from the University of East London, a MSc degree in biochemistry from the University of Reading and a post graduate diploma in crop protection technology from Imperial College.

He worked in a number of local and regional institutions including the Caribbean Development Bank, but it was as manager of the Dominica Banana Marketing Company that he rose to prominence on the island. He was instrumental in resuscitating the island's critical banana industry which had been decimated by Hurricane David. James has been active in regional cricket as an administrator and was the manager of the Windward Islands cricket team and the Combined Islands cricket team. He is a member of the Rotary Club.

== Career ==
=== 1988–1999 ===
In 1988, he headed a committee which founded the United Workers' Party and became its first political leader. From its inception, the party was assailed as a group of "disgruntled businessmen" or "greedy businessmen" as described by the established parties but, in 1990, the party won six seats in the 21 seat House of Assembly and James became the Leader of the Opposition. As leader of the opposition, he criticized the ruling Dominica Freedom Party for instituting an economic-citizen programme whereby persons could become citizens of the island for a fee. In the run-up to the 1995 elections, James accused the Eugenia Charles-led government of bugging his party's offices. A commission formed to investigate the matter concluded that the allegations were baseless.

On June 12, 1995, elections he led the party to victory with 11 out of 21 seats with fewer votes than the incumbent Freedom Party and became prime minister. By then, the banana industry was no longer vibrant and so the James-led government embarked on an ambitious program of economic diversification. It passed legislation allowing the creation of off-shore business. In addition, it sought to allow an Australian mining company to conduct exploratory drilling on the island but that move was subsequently abandoned due to criticisms that it would sully the island's reputation as "The Nature Isle". When the UWP government divested its shares in the island's only power company, the move was met with vociferous condemnation by the opposition. The opposition was also aroused to indignation by the government's decision to offer asylum to the Saudi dissident Mohammad al-Massari, a decision which James later admitted was based on a hope of increased British aid. The government was also pilloried for the economic citizenship program which it had re-engineered and enlarged when it came into office; some thought that the island could become a haven for criminal elements. This criticism was fuelled by the revelation that the Australian fugitive Christopher Skase had used the programme to become a citizen of the island. Trying to increase the number of stay-over visitors to the island, the UWP government sought to build an international airport, but this was again met with a cacophony of criticism as some thought that the country would not be able to pay back the debt which would have had to be contracted. The government purchased the requisite lands for the airport but did not have time to physically begin the project. The James-led government was dogged by charges of corruption and these allegations only increased as its term progressed.

James' government did produce some significant achievements. There was a proliferation in the number of scholarships available for secondary and college education. There was some success in diversifying the island's monocrop agricultural sector away from bananas and towards other crops. It also increased public spending on capital projects including roads, schools and sea walls. These projects had a visible impact on the economy and the economy grew every year under his leadership. This sort of economic program was branded "tou-pas-touism", a Creole word meaning "everywhere". However, the opposition argued that the growing economy was only being financed by debt. Feeling confident with his government's achievements, James called a snap election six months before it were due in order to quell the allegations of corruption.

=== 2000–present ===
In the January 2000 elections, the party suffered a surprise defeat. Though it won the most votes as a block, the party lost three seats and its majority in parliament. No party won enough seats to form a government on its own. Dominica's other two major parties, the Dominica Freedom Party and the Dominica Labour Party, had agreed to a co-operation agreement to win the election and it was no surprise when they made a coalition against the Workers' Party. James was replaced as prime minister by Roosevelt Douglas.

In February 2000, James returned to the office of leader of the opposition. Back in opposition, he called on the government to prosecute the charges of corruption in order to clear his party's name, but the government never charged any members of his party with wrongdoing. He was sued for libel by Eugenia Charles as a result of the bugging allegations; he agreed to compensate as well as to publicly apologise to Dame Eugenia.

In the May 2005 elections, the party conducted a vigorous campaign but it lost one seat in parliament. James continued as leader of the opposition. In July 2005, he was appointed to the CARICOM leaders of government and parliamentary opposition parties committee. However, in December 2005, he did not seek re-election as party leader and he was replaced by Earl Williams. In July 2007, he ceded the office to Williams.

A February 2007 poll conducted by Caribbean Development Research Services Inc (CADRES) found that, though he is no longer leader of the United Workers' Party, he still enjoyed considerable support. 32% of respondents favored his leadership, compared to 58% for the prime minister, Skerrit, and 6% for the current United Workers' Party leader, Williams. James was president of the UWP for three years, and then was re-elected political leader of the party at its January 2012 convention.

Preceded by Eugenia Charles	Prime Minister of Dominica; 14 June 1995 to February 3, 2000	Succeeded by Rosie Douglas

Preceded by Michael Douglas	Leader of the Opposition; June 1, 1990 to June 14, 1995	Succeeded by Brian Alleyne

Preceded by Rosie Douglas	Leader of the Opposition; 3 February 2000 to 16 July 2007	Succeeded by Earl Williams
