= Salisbury, Dominica =

Salisbury Barroui, Bawi
- Village
- Location in Dominica
- Coordinates: 15°26′9″N 61°26′13″W
- Country: Dominica
- Parish: Saint Joseph Parish
- Elevation: 50 m (160 ft)

Population (2010)
  - Total: 2,590
- Time zone: UTC-4 (UTC)

Salisbury is a town on the west coast of the small Caribbean island nation of Dominica. It is located at 15°26′9″N 61°26′13″W and is a part of the country's St. Joseph administrative division. Its population is 2,129.

The Creole name for the town is Barroui (pronounced as "bah-wee"; also spelled Baroui or Bawi). During English colonization and the increasing Anglicizing of the nation that occurred during the 1900s, Salisbury became an equally accepted name. For the first half of the 20th century, the town was little more than a small village of thatched-roof huts along the shore, with the only significant building being the local Catholic Church (constructed 1929). During the 1950s and 1960s, however, the banana industry began to use the town as a port where bananas could be transferred from feeder roads into the island's interior to "banana boats" exporting the nation's produce. In recent years, the community, which was heavily dependent on agriculture, remains a significant contributor towards agricultural development on the island. After private land was put up for sale, the town snapped it up and grew to the north.

On August 29, 1976, the Dominican premier, Patrick Roland John, introduced the idea of independence to the nation. There, he signed the Salisbury Declaration: a document citing the intentions of what was then an island colony of Britain to become an independent state.

The first elected parliamentary representative to serve in the community was Bryson Louis, who won the 1975 general election on a Labour Party ticket. Prior to that, Clarence Louis was appointed by Edward Oliver LeBlanc to serve as a nominated member of parliament. In the 1980 general election, Dennison John, on a Freedom Party ticket, received the mandate. Following this term, James Royer was elected in 1985. During the 1990 election, Earl Williams was elected parliamentary representative, running for the United Workers' Party. Hector John is the village's current parliamentary representative.
