= List of heads of government of Dominica =

This article lists the heads of government of Dominica.

The Prime Minister of Dominica is the head of government under the system implemented by the Constitution of 1978, the year of Dominica's independence.

The current Prime Minister of Dominica is Roosevelt Skerrit, since 8 January 2004.

== List of officeholders ==
Political parties

Dominica United People's Party (DUPP)
Dominica Labour Party (DLP)
Dominica Democratic Labour Party (DDLP)
Dominica Freedom Party (DFP)
United Workers' Party (UWP)

Status

Denotes acting prime minister

Symbols

^{†} Died in office

=== Chief ministers of Dominica (1960–1967) ===
No.	Portrait	Name (Birth–Death)	Election	Term of office			Political party
No.	Portrait	Name (Birth–Death)	Election	Took office	Left office	Time in office	Political party
1		Frank Baron (1923–2016)	—	1 January 1960	21 January 1961	1 year, 20 days	DUPP
2		Edward Oliver LeBlanc (1923–2004)	1961; 1966	21 January 1961	1 March 1967	6 years, 39 days	DLP

=== Premiers of Dominica (1967–1978) ===
No.	Portrait	Name (Birth–Death)	Election	Term of office			Political party
No.	Portrait	Name (Birth–Death)	Election	Took office	Left office	Time in office	Political party
1		Edward Oliver LeBlanc (1923–2004)	1970	1 March 1967	27 July 1974	7 years, 148 days	DLP
2		Patrick John (1938–2021)	1975	28 July 1974	2 November 1978	4 years, 97 days	DLP

=== Prime ministers of Dominica (1978–present) ===
No.	Portrait	Name (Birth–Death)	Election	Term of office			Political party
No.	Portrait	Name (Birth–Death)	Election	Took office	Left office	Time in office	Political party
1		Patrick John (1938–2021)	—	3 November 1978	25 June 1979	234 days	DLP
—		Oliver Seraphin (born 1943)	—	25 June 1979	21 July 1980	1 year, 26 days	DDLP
2		Eugenia Charles (1919–2005)	1980; 1985; 1990	21 July 1980	14 June 1995	14 years, 328 days	DFP
3		Edison James (born 1943)	1995	14 June 1995	3 February 2000	4 years, 234 days	UWP
4		Rosie Douglas (1941–2000)	2000	3 February 2000	1 October 2000^{[†]}	241 days	DLP
5		Pierre Charles (1954–2004)	—	1 October 2000	3 October 2000	3 years, 97 days	DLP
5		Pierre Charles (1954–2004)	—	3 October 2000	6 January 2004^{[†]}	3 years, 97 days	DLP
—		Osborne Riviere (1932–2017)	—	6 January 2004	8 January 2004	2 days	DLP
6		Roosevelt Skerrit (born 1972)	2005; 2009; 2014; 2019; 2022	8 January 2004	Incumbent	22 years, 12 days (as of 20 January 2026)	DLP

== Timeline ==
This is a graphical lifespan timeline of the prime ministers of Dominica. They are listed in order of first assuming office.

The following chart lists prime ministers by lifespan (living prime ministers on the green line), with the years outside of their tenure in beige.

== See also ==
- List of presidents of Dominica
- Premier of Dominica
- Prime Minister of Dominica
- Lists of office-holders
