= Edward Oliver LeBlanc =

Dominican politician (1923–2004)

1st Premier of Dominica
- In office 1 March 1967 – 27 July 1974
- Deputy: Nicholson Ducreay; Ronald Armour
- Succeeded by: Patrick John

Chief Minister of Dominica
- In office 21 January 1961 – 1 March 1967
- Monarch: Elizabeth II
- Preceded by: Frank Baron

Personal details
- Born: 3 October 1923 Vieille Case, Dominica
- Died: 29 October 2004 (aged 81) Vieille Case, Dominica
- Party: Dominica Labour Party
- Spouse: Ethel Patrick (m. 1949)

Edward Oliver LeBlanc (3 October 1923 – 29 October 2004) was a Dominican politician who served as the chief minister from January 1961 to 1 March 1967 and as the first premier from 1 March 1967 to 27 July 1974. Born in Vieille Case, a village in the north of the island, LeBlanc attended the local school and studied agriculture at the Imperial College of Tropical Agriculture in Trinidad. He worked in the civil service and became a member of the Dominica Trade Union. An early member of the Dominica Labour Party (DLP), he served as a representative in the country's Legislative Council representing the constituency of Portsmouth between 1957 and 1958, and as a representative of Dominica in the Federal Parliament of the West Indies Federation upon its foundation in 1958. LeBlanc left the federation in 1960 to run for election to the national legislature.

In the 1961 general election, LeBlanc was elected to the constituency of Roseau South and was sworn in as the chief minister and minister of finance. He was dedicated to representing the working class, particularly developing the nation's infrastructure, education and culture. He worked to develop Dominica's roads system and championed the native dance bélé, the Kwéyòl language and the country's national day. On 1 March 1967, Dominica was granted associated statehood and LeBlanc became the first premier. The DLP began to face challenges from the newly established Dominica Freedom Party and the growing youth and Rastafarian movements. In the 1970 general election, LeBlanc was challenged by three of his ministers, Nicholson Ducreay, W. S. Stevens and Mabel Moir James, but he formed a new party for the election, the LeBlanc Labour Party and succeeded in winning eight of the eleven seats in the legislature.

LeBlanc resigned as premier on 27 July 1974 and was replaced by his deputy premier Patrick John. He was a delegate at the Constitutional Conference in May 1977 but otherwise retired from public life, returning to his hometown in Vieille Case. LeBlanc was honoured with the Dominica Award of Honour in 1976 and he has been described as "father of the nation".

== Early life ==
LeBlanc was born on 3 October 1923 in Vieille Case, a village on the north coast of Dominica. Growing up in a rural environment, where the village was not connected to the rest of the island by roads, significantly shaped his political leanings. Later in life, LeBlanc would often speak about his own informal education, which led to his contempt for those he considered intellectuals. He attended the local government school but when he applied for a scholarship for university, he was rejected for lacking a secondary school education. LeBlanc studied agriculture at the Imperial College of Tropical Agriculture (now part of the University of the West Indies) in Trinidad, graduating in 1944. In 1948, he received a London matriculated certificate. He joined the civil service in Dominica, working as an agricultural instructor, and often travelled through the rural portions of the island. A member of the Dominica Trade Union (DTU), he later began working for the Dominica Banana Growers Association and was elected to the local town council. In 1949, he married his wife Ethel and the couple had five children: Ewart, Erin, Einstar, Earlsworth and Eustace.

== Political career ==
LeBlanc joined the Dominica Labour Party (DLP) in 1957, which had been established on 24 May 1955 by the trade unionist Emmanuel Christopher Loblack and the writer Phyllis Shand Allfrey. He was elected to the Legislative Council in the 1957 general election to represent the constituency of Portsmouth, beating R. B. Douglas with 46.9% of the vote. Douglas was a powerful adversary, as a businessman who controlled trade between Portsmouth and the capital in Roseau, but LeBlanc captured public interest due to his charisma and for campaigning in patois. Despite LeBlanc's success, the DLP suffered many losses in its first election, including Allfrey's loss to Elkin Henry.

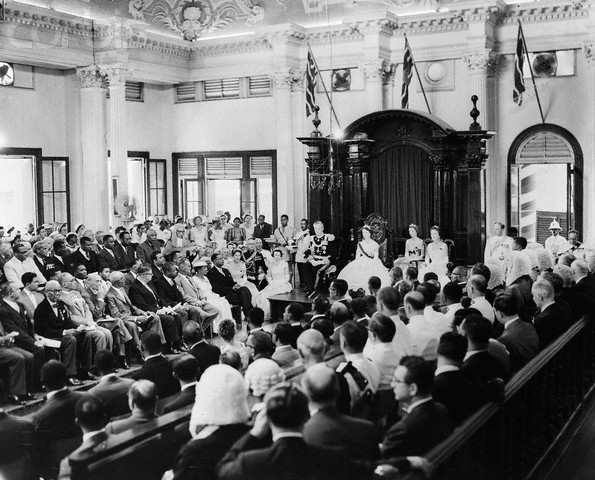
Inauguration of the West Indies Federation in 1958

When Dominica joined the nascent West Indies Federation the following year, LeBlanc resigned from the legislative council and ran in the March 1958 federal elections to represent Dominica in the federation's legislative body, the Federal Parliament of the West Indies Federation. He was elected alongside Allfrey, with both DLP candidates receiving the most votes in the election. The elections were a Labour landslide, largely because the country's middle class saw no future in the federation and, believing it would soon collapse, did not field a strong candidate to oppose them. The federation – composed of ten member states, including Trinidad and Tobago, Jamaica and the former members of the Windward Islands – was intended to strength relationships in the region and was considered by some politicians to be a step towards independence. Based in Trinidad, the Federal House of Representatives was led by a small majority by the West Indian Federal Labour Party, with which the DLP had allied itself. The union was short-lived and the federation dissolved in 1962 when Jamaica and Trinidad and Tobago both decided to leave.

LeBlanc returned to Dominica in 1960 after resigning from the federal parliament. Ahead of the 1961 general election, Allfrey challenged LeBlanc for leadership of the DLP on the basis of their ideological split; LeBlanc pushed for independence from the British Empire and increased separation from the DTU, while Allfrey preferred changes within the existing colonial structure. LeBlanc won the leadership and expelled Allfrey and, later, Loblack from the party in 1964. In the election on 17 January 1961, he won one of the eleven seats in the legislature, defeating Frank Baron to represent the Roseau South constituency. The DLP was challenged in the election by the Dominica United People's Party (DUPP), which had been founded by Baron and R. H. Lockhart the same year. The DLP won 47.5% of the vote and 7 seats in the legislature, with the DUPP winning 25.6% of the vote and 4 seats. This was the party's first major electoral victory and LeBlanc was sworn in as the chief minister and minister of finance. He was the first person of his background – being described as the "little boy from the country" – to have become the head of government for the country.

=== Chief minister (1961–1967) ===
Following the election, LeBlanc and his allies shifted the focus of the DLP to suit the issues that he had campaigned for – the party moved away from its role as the political arm of the DTU and colonial politics to become a working class party that was open to middle class intellectuals. While the DLP under Allfrey and Loblack had a socialist lean which continued under LeBlanc, he felt that they had not gone far enough. LeBlanc was committed to achieving independence from Britain and to helping poor workers, whom he called "little men", a catchphrase that still remains in Dominican politics. He had a strong relationship with the working class and black communities, who felt represented in government for the first time, although his focus on rural citizens was frequently contrasted with his contempt for those that he considered elite, notably those from Roseau who had historically held political power, which were often described by the DLP as the "mulatto gros bourg". LeBlanc was described by the writer Selwyn Ryan as "a radical populist who sought to govern Dominica on behalf of the black masses. He was a man of the people and a leader to whom the masses and the petit bourgs had ready access and who could speak their language". One of his first acts as chief minister was to insist that local people should be invited to state functions, rather than British expatriates.

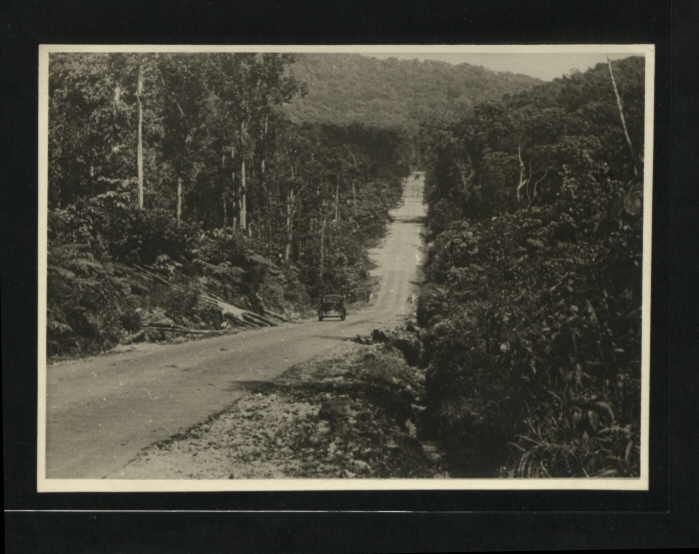
Newly constructed Layou Valley Road in the late 1950s

As chief minister, LeBlanc was focused on infrastructure, education and national pride. One significant accomplishment was expanding the nation's roads system, which benefited the agricultural industry. LeBlanc was often frustrated by leading a country still under colonial British rule. During the early 1960s, he was focused on infrastructure development, as much of the island was still unconnected by roads but the colonial administrators refused to pay to build any major roads as they claimed not to have the funds, although they would build feeder roads. In response, LeBlanc established a system to divide the roads that he wanted constructed into sections and request funds from the British government to construct each section separately. Using this strategy, he succeeded in building a road to connect the coastal villages to the ports in Roseau and Portsmouth. The LeBlanc government mandated a primary school education for local children and constructed the Dominica Grammar School, which included a technical training programme, Portsmouth Secondary School and Clifton Dupigny Technical College. It established a National Providence Fund, to provide pensions, funded affordable housing in Canefield and helped to re-vitalise village councils.

LeBlanc retained his working-class roots as chief minister and refused to wear a suit jacket and tie, used by middle class Dominicans to distinguish themselves from those of a lower class, to state functions or other formal events. Despite the criticism that he faced for this decision, it led to a change in social norms and the typical formal wear on the island became a loose white shirt described as an "Afro-Jacket". The use of patois in a formal setting was also discouraged, with many middle class Dominicans pretending not to understand it and schools forbidding it to be taught. LeBlanc was a strong champion of the Kwéyòl language, the local Creole dialect, and often used it in his campaign meetings. Through these efforts, it became an important part of the nation's cultural heritage, being used in the country's motto and spoken on the national radio station. This focus on cultural nationalism was crucial to LeBlanc's legacy. He commissioned the magazine Dies Dominica and a work titled Aspects of Dominican History. LeBlanc helped to promote the country's national day as a cultural festival, with dance, music and art contests, and encouraged the revival of the native dance bélé and funded the choral singers Siffleur Montagne.

In the 1966 general election, the DUPP were soundly defeated by the DLP, retaining only one seat in the legislature, and following the resignation of Baron, the party dissolved. The DLP was essentially without an opposition party between 1961 and 1968. Even middle class voters, who had previously opposed the party, began to support the DLP after 1965. There was a popular tale in Dominica during LeBlanc's time in power that he could run a broomstick as a DLP candidate and still win the election.

=== Premiership (1967–1974) ===
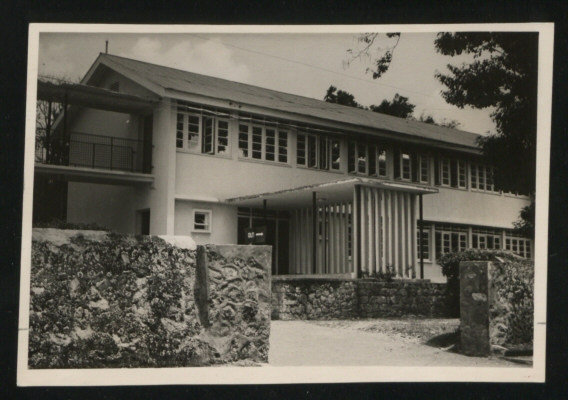
The Ministerial Building in the late 1950s

After the dissolution of the West Indies Federation, talks began between various Windward and Leeward Islands to establish a new federation, the "Little Eight". The discussions carried on for four years, with LeBlanc expressing that the new federation "would preserve democracy in the area", but no results ever materialised and Dominica was ultimately left to determine its own constitutional change. In April 1966, London hosted the Windward Islands Constitutional Conference, which established a plan for the British to grant Dominica associated statehood. On 1 March 1967, the Dominica Constitutional Order 1967 came into force and under the new structure, a governor would act as the executive, advised by a cabinet comprising a premier and government ministers serving in the House of Assembly. Under this new structure, LeBlanc became the first premier. This arrangement meant that Dominica had control over its own internal politics and policies, while Britain would handle the country's foreign affairs and national defense. LeBlanc often expressed his dissatisfaction with this arrangement, believing that Dominica should be given the same independence as Grenada, which would expand the country's national government and grant it a seat at the United Nations General Assembly.

The DLP received its first challenge since the dissolution of the DUPP in 1968, when a speech criticising the government for supposed communist policies was reported in the Dominica Herald. A group of newspaper editors, including Allfrey of the Dominica Star, Stanley Boyd of the Chronicle and Edward Scobie of the Herald, increased their criticism of a government that faced no significant political challenge. The government, led by LeBlanc, reacted by passing legislation intended to restrict media criticism, the Seditious and Undesirable Publications Act, which was nicknamed the "Shut-Your-Mouth Bill". These editors, led by the barrister Eugenia Charles, founded a group called the Freedom Fighters, composed of upper-class merchants and professionals. The Freedom Fighters held rallies and infiltrated the House of Assembly to disrupt debates on the legislation but despite these efforts, the act was passed. A petition to repeal the act received over 3,000 signatures and led to a rally on 23 September 1968, where LeBlanc was said to have stated, "We are here to rule and rule we will". Although the act was not repealed, the law was never enforced and several leaders of the Freedom Fighters, including Charles, Allfrey and Loblack, joined to form a new political party, the Dominica Freedom Party (DFP), to contest the 1970 general election.

The 1970 elections were the first under Dominica's new political system. Aside from facing a challenge from the new DFP, LeBlanc was confronted by dissent within his own party. Ahead of the election on 26 October 1970, LeBlanc was challenged by three of his ministers – Nicholson Ducreay, W. S. Stevens and Mabel Moir James – who intended to remove LeBlanc from the DLP on the basis that he was an autocrat. Speaking on this issue, LeBlanc said "he cannot involve the Opposition because in the British tradition, which Dominica follows, Edward Heath does not send Harold Wilson to negotiate issues which Heath's Government is involved in." Patrick L. Baker suggested that part of their concern was that Ronald Armour was gaining too much influence over LeBlanc, while Imaobong Umoren wrote that their challenge was influenced by LeBlanc's nationalism and opposition to foreign investment. In response to this challenge, LeBlanc established the LeBlanc Labour Party only days before the election and won eight of the eleven seats in the legislature, with the DLP retaining one seat and the DFP picking up two seats. LeBlanc was elected to the north-western constituency with 1,537 votes.

The country's close links with Guyana, particularly the People's National Congress led by the prime minister Forbes Burnham, began to gather notice. LeBlanc was committed to strengthening Dominica's connections with other countries in the region, including hosting the Expo 1969 Trade Fair. In 1971, LeBlanc met with leaders of Guyana and other Caribbean states and was the first to sign the Grenada Declaration on 25 July 1972, which was intended to strength relationships in the region, but it was politically controversial in Dominica. That same year, the DFP won the local Roseau elections and the LeBlanc government reacted by introducing the Roseau Town Council (Dissolution and Interim Commissioner) Bill to replace the town council with a commissioner. A demonstration led by the Freedom Fighters and Louis Benoit of the Waterfront and Allied Workers' Union occupied the House of Assembly, drawing a response from the Dominica Defense Force (a successor to the Dominica Volunteer Force founded by LeBlanc).

In 1973, there began to be another split in the country's government, exacerbated by the growing youth and Rastafarian movements. A radio announcer, Daniel Cauderion, was transferred to a desk job due to his negative comments about the LeBlanc government. In response, the country's civil service, led by the Civil Service Association, went on strike. The country declared a state of emergency, which would involve police brutality against civilians. During this time, LeBlanc's deputy premier Armour resigned on 13 July 1973 and was subsequently blamed for the circumstances leading to the state of emergency. These movements, led by the Dreads and the Four Corner Boys, only continued to grow more influential as the Movement for a New Dominica gained power. Violence continued into 1974, including between police and civilians at the 1974 Carnival celebrations in Grand Bay. LeBlanc's deputy premier Patrick John gained prominence in the party for his radio appearances calling for an aggressive response.

LeBlanc stepped down as the DLP leader in July 1974. He then resigned his position as premier and his seat in the House of Assembly by sending a letter of resignation to the governor Louis Cools-Lartigue two weeks later, on 27 July 1974. John, who had won a party convention to replace LeBlanc as party leader, was sworn in as premier two days later. There are several theories as to why LeBlanc decided to resign, including that he was influenced by the economic or political position in the country, as the 1970s oil crisis impacted finances and traction of the youth and Rastafarian movements, or that he was impacted by colonial politics.

== Death and legacy ==
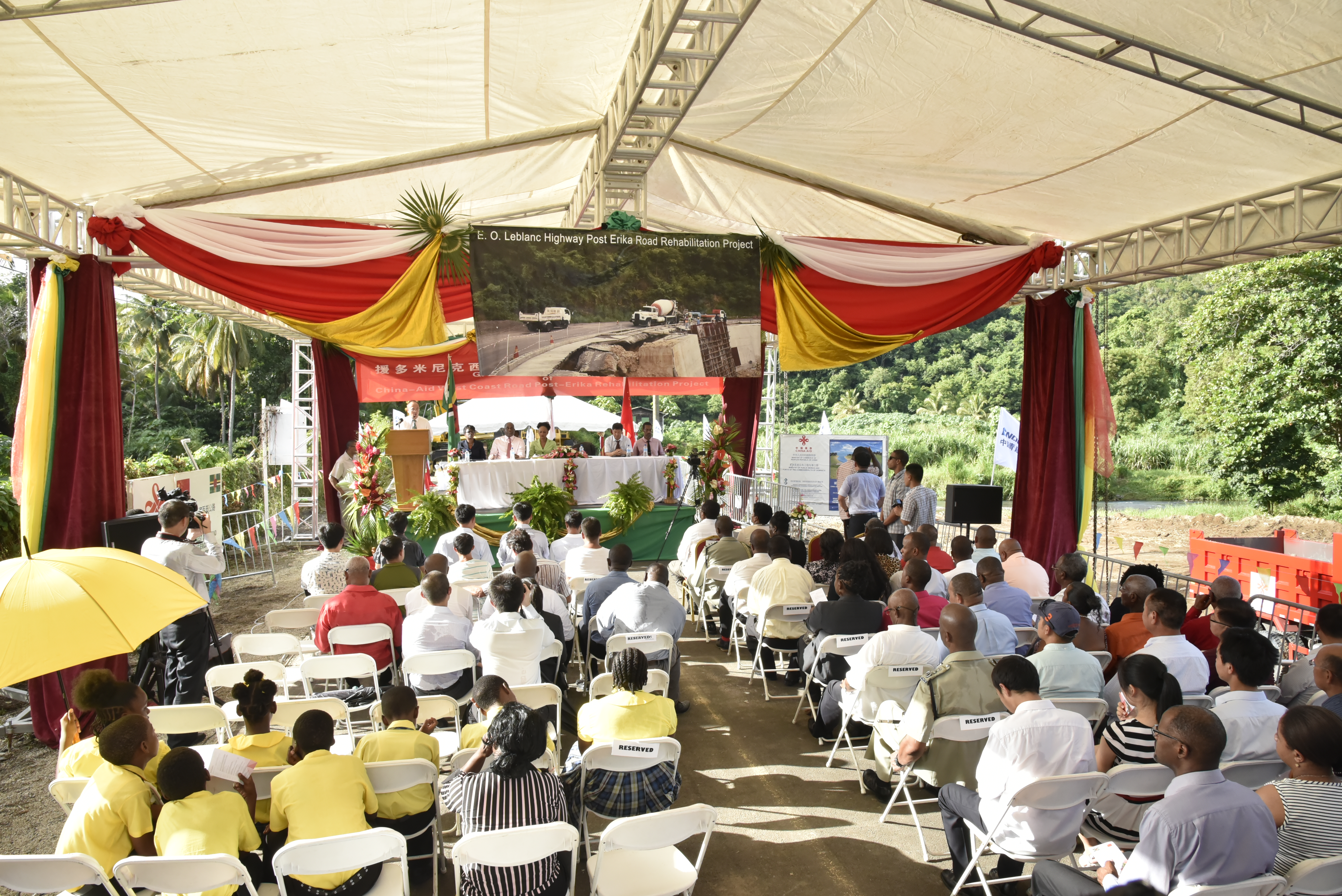
Groundbreaking for the Edward Oliver Leblanc Highway in 2017

LeBlanc returned to Vieille Case after resigning from government. He was a delegate at the Constitutional Conference in May 1977 but after the conference, he left public life. LeBlanc was honoured with the Dominica Award of Honour in 1976. He died in Vieille Case on 29 October 2004 at the age of 81. The West Coast Road, connecting Portsmouth and Roseau, was renamed the Edward Oliver Leblanc Highway in 2012.

Since his death, LeBlanc has been described as "father of the nation" and he has been honoured in his country as a hero, gaining the prefix "papa" and "uncle" before his name. His legacy has been associated with his work in the 1960s to improve national infrastructure and for standing for "the little man" and supporting the country's working class by improving education opportunities and encouraging a strong national culture. He has been criticised for his attitude as head of government, which has been described as divisive, and for leaving behind a legacy of "victimhood".

Preceded by Frank Baron	Chief Minister of Dominica; 1961–1967	Succeeded by Himself as Premier
Preceded by Himself as Chief Minister	Premier of Dominica; 1 March 1967 – 27 July 1974	Succeeded by Patrick John
