= Nicholson Ducreay =

Dominican politician

Deputy Premier of Dominica
- In office March 1967 – 1970
- Premier: Edward Oliver LeBlanc
- Succeeded by: Ronald Armour

Personal details
- Party: Dominica Labour Party

Nicholson Alexander Nathaniel Ducreay (20 December 1930 – 1 July 2017) was a Dominican politician.

== Early life ==
Ducreay was born on 20 December 1930 in Wesley. His mother, Enid Matilda Ducreay, was from Cochrane and her family owned the Stewart Hall Estate. His father, Nicholson Thomas, was headteacher of Wesley Primary School. Ducreay attended Dominica Grammar School in Roseau between 1944 and 1949. After graduation, he worked as a teacher at the Cochrane Primary School for three years, before establishing his own lumber business in Roseau.

== Political career ==
There was a turning point in Dominican politics on 24 May 1955 when Emmanuel Christopher Loblack and Phyllis Shand Allfrey established the new Dominica Labour Party (DLP). Ducreay was by this time well known in Roseau, particularly for his public speaking. Allfrey approached him in 1957 to ask him to join the DLP and run as a candidate for the Roseau North constituency in the 1957 Dominican general election. Ducreay won his election on 15 August and took his place in the legislature with two other DLP members: Edward Oliver LeBlanc and R. P. St. Luce. There were only eight constituencies at the time and the other five seats were held by the governing party, Frank Baron's Dominica United People's Party (DUPP).

In July 1960, DUPP legislators Lionel Laville and L. C. Didier resigned, forcing a new general election on 17 January 1961. Ducreay won re-election and the DLP won a majority of the increased eleven constituencies. In the newly-formed government, Ducreay was appointed Minister of Trade and Production, under LeBlanc as chief minister. He held the position for five years, during which time the banana and citrus producers thrived and many new infrastructure projects were funded by the British Colonial Development and Welfare Fund. This included bringing "roads, ports, new schools, health clinics and water supply systems among other developments to the island for the first time".

The DLP was re-elected to government in a landslide on 7 January 1966, carrying ten of the eleven constituencies. The government quickly began to face issues, with internal dissension and the formation of the nascent Dominica Freedom Party (DFP) in 1968. In his role as a cabinet minister, Ducreay would sometimes step in for LeBlanc in foreign commitments, including representing Dominica at the 1968 establishment of the Caribbean Free Trade Association, a precursor to CARICOM. He was appointed Deputy Premier of Dominica on 1 March 1967.

Ahead of the 26 October 1970 general election, Ducreay and two other ministers, W. S. Stevens and Mabel Moir James, formed a new bloc to remove LeBlanc from the DLP on the basis that he was an autocrat. In response, LeBlanc established the LeBlanc Labour Party and beat all of his opponents in the election, with the exception of Stevens. Having lost the election, Ducreay left politics to return to his business. He later spoke favourably about the formation of the United Workers' Party in 1988. After the 2000 general election, a new generation of politicians sought out Ducreay's advice and he became an active supporter of the DLP again, as well as a radio commentator and platform speaker.

== Personal life ==
Ducreay built his own house in lower Goodwill. He died on 1 July 2017 at his home in Roseau, at the age of 87. Prior to his death, he had suffered from kidney complications and hypertension.
