= Soufrière (Dominica constituency) =

Electoral district of Dominica

- Constituency for the House of Assembly of Dominica
- Electorate: 3,460 (2022)

Current constituency
- Party: Dominica Labour Party
- Representative: Denise Charles-Pemberton

Soufrière is one of the 21 electoral districts of the House of Assembly of Dominica. It contains the areas of Pointe Michel, Scotts Head, and Soufrière. It is currently represented by Dominica Labour Party MP Denise Charles-Pemberton.

== Electorate ==
The following is a list of the number of eligible voters in the Soufrière constituency at the time of each election provided by the Electoral Office of Dominica.

Year	Electorate	Notes
1975	1,935	
1980	1,892	
1985	2,095	
1990	2,188	
1995	2,596	
2000	2,689	
2005	3,149	
2014	3,426	
2016	3,431	
2019	3,463	
2022	3,460	

== List of representatives ==
Election	Years	Member	Party (Note: Indicates party the MP was running with during their election.)	Notes
1975	1975 – 1985	Anthony Moise	DFP	
1985	1985 – 2000	Charles Maynard	DFP	
2000	2000 – 2005	Frederick Baron	DFP	
2005	2005 – 2009	Ian Pinard	DLP	
2009	2009 – 2014	Sam Martin	DLP	
2014	2014 – 2016	Ian Pinard	DLP	Resigned.
2016 (Note: By-election)	2016 –	Denise Charles-Pemberton	DLP	

== Electoral history ==
The following is a list of election results from the Electoral Office of Dominica. The election results lack spoiled and rejected ballots.

2009 Soufrière general election
Candidate	Party	Votes	%
Sam Martin	Dominica Labour Party	1,214	59.39
Glen Etienne	United Workers' Party	777	38.01
Felita Paul Thomas	Dominica Freedom Party	53	2.59
Total		2,044	100.00
DLP hold			

2014 Soufrière general election
Candidate	Party	Votes	%
Ian Pinard	Dominica Labour Party	1,326	61.73
Higgs Adams	United Workers' Party	822	38.27
Total		2,148	100.00
DLP hold			

2016 Soufrière by-election
Candidate	Party	Votes	%
Denise Charles-Pemberton	Dominica Labour Party	1,345	70.53
Higgs Adams	United Workers' Party	562	29.47
Total		1,907	100.00
DLP hold			

2019 Soufrière general election
Candidate	Party	Votes	%
Denise Charles-Pemberton	Dominica Labour Party	1,352	69.19
Samuel Christian	United Workers' Party	602	30.81
Total		1,954	100.00
DLP hold			

2022 Soufrière general election
Candidate	Party	Votes	%
Denise Charles-Pemberton	Dominica Labour Party	1,257	94.09
Tahira Blanchard	Independent	79	5.91
Total		1,336	100.00
DLP hold			
