= Mabel Moir James =

Dominican politician

Mabel Moir James (1912–2010) was the first woman political minister in Dominica. She was active in women's rights movements and founded the Women's Guild in Dominica.

== Early life ==
Moir James was born in 1917 to a Scottish father and mother of African descent.

== Career ==
Before entering politics, she worked with her husband, a pharmacist, in a drug store. She became a member of the Dominica Labour Party and unsuccessfully contested the 1961 general election. She won a seat for the Western District in the 1966 general election. She was appointed as the Minister of Communications and Works, the first woman to be a government minister of Dominica (as Phylis Shand Allfrey was a minister of the Federation of the West Indies). She helped to found the Women's Guild in Dominica.

In 1967, Dominica received associated statehood from Britain, and Moir-James became the Minister of Home Affairs the same year. In this role, she focused on domestic violence, child support, sick leave, affordable housing and women's rights. Alongside Nicholson Ducreay and Wills Stevens, she challenged Edward Oliver LeBlanc as leader of the party prior to the 1970 general election. They were concerned that LeBlanc opposed foreign investment in the country. LeBlanc formed the LeBlanc Labour Party in response and Ducreay and Moir James both lost re-election.

== Personal life ==
Moir James was married, her husband was a pharmacist.

== Legacy ==
Moir James received a state funeral on 1 February 2010. She was buried at the Roseau Public Cemetery.
