= Reginald Austrie =

Dominican politician

Reginald Victor Austrie
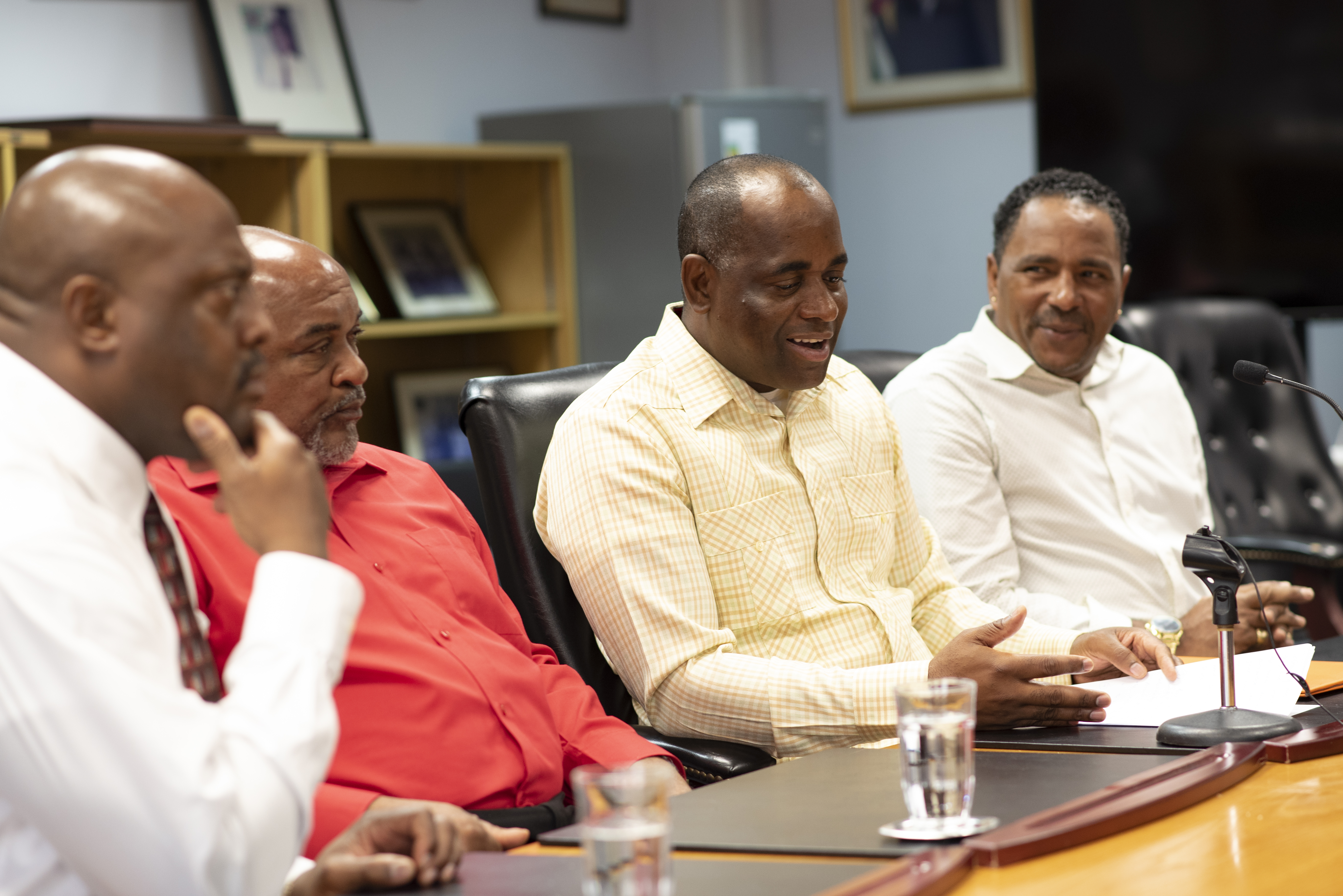
- Austrie is second from left in red shirt

Deputy Prime Minister of Dominica
- In office 11 April 2018 – 17 December 2019
- Prime Minister: Roosevelt Skerrit
- Preceded by: Ambrose George
- Succeeded by: Irving McIntyre

Personal details
- Party: Dominica Labour Party

Reginald Austrie is a Dominican politician from the Dominica Labour Party.

He was elected to the House of Assembly of Dominica in 1995 from Cottage constituency. He was re-elected in 2000, 2005, 2009, 2014, 2019.

In 2000, Austrie was appointed minister responsible for small business development. He was minister for communications and works in 2005. In 2005 he was appointed minister of housing, lands and water. He was minister of housing, lands, settlements and water from 2007 to 2014. Austrie was appointed acting Prime Minister of Dominica for Roosevelt Skerrit for example in 2014. He was appointed minister of housing, lands and water from 2014 to 2018.

Austrie was appointed Deputy Prime Minister of Dominica and minister of agriculture in April 2018. He lost the title in a cabinet reshuffle in December 2019, and continued as senior minister and minister of housing.

Austrie retired from political arena in 2022. He was awarded Dominica Award of Honour in November 2022.
