= Charles Maynard (Dominican politician) =

Dominican politician (1934–2012)

Deputy Prime Minister of Dominica
- In office 1985 – 1991 or later
- Prime Minister: Eugenia Charles
- Preceded by: Anthony Moise

Personal details
- Party: Dominica Freedom Party

Charles Maynard was a Dominican politician and cabinet minister from Dominica Freedom Party.

Maynard was born on 18 January 1934 in Roseau. He was educated in the University of the West Indies, the University College of Wales at Aberystwyth and the University of Oxford, England. Back in Dominica, he worked as civil servant.

During the summer 1979 political turmoil, Maynard was appointed minister of education in the cabinet of Oliver Seraphin. He resigned from the cabinet in January 1980.

When Dominica Freedom Party (DFP) led by Eugenia Charles won the elections of 1980, Maynard was asked to join the cabinet as minister of education. In the elections of 1985 Maynard succeeded Anthony Moise as the representative of Soufrière in the House of Assembly as a member of DFP. He was a member of the legislature for fifteen years. Maynard was also appointed Deputy Prime Minister of Dominica up until at least 1991. He was later minister of agriculture and tourism. In 1993 he ran in the leadership elections of DFP to succeed Eugenia Charles, but eventually he lost to Brian Alleyne.

Maynard was later appointed by the Dominica Labour Party government as ambassador to CARICOM. He died on 8 May 2012.
