= 1985 Dominican general election =

Election in Dominica

- 1 July 1985

21 of the 30 seats in the House of Assembly 11 seats needed for a majority
- Registered: 45,018
- Turnout: 74.56% (▼5.65pp)
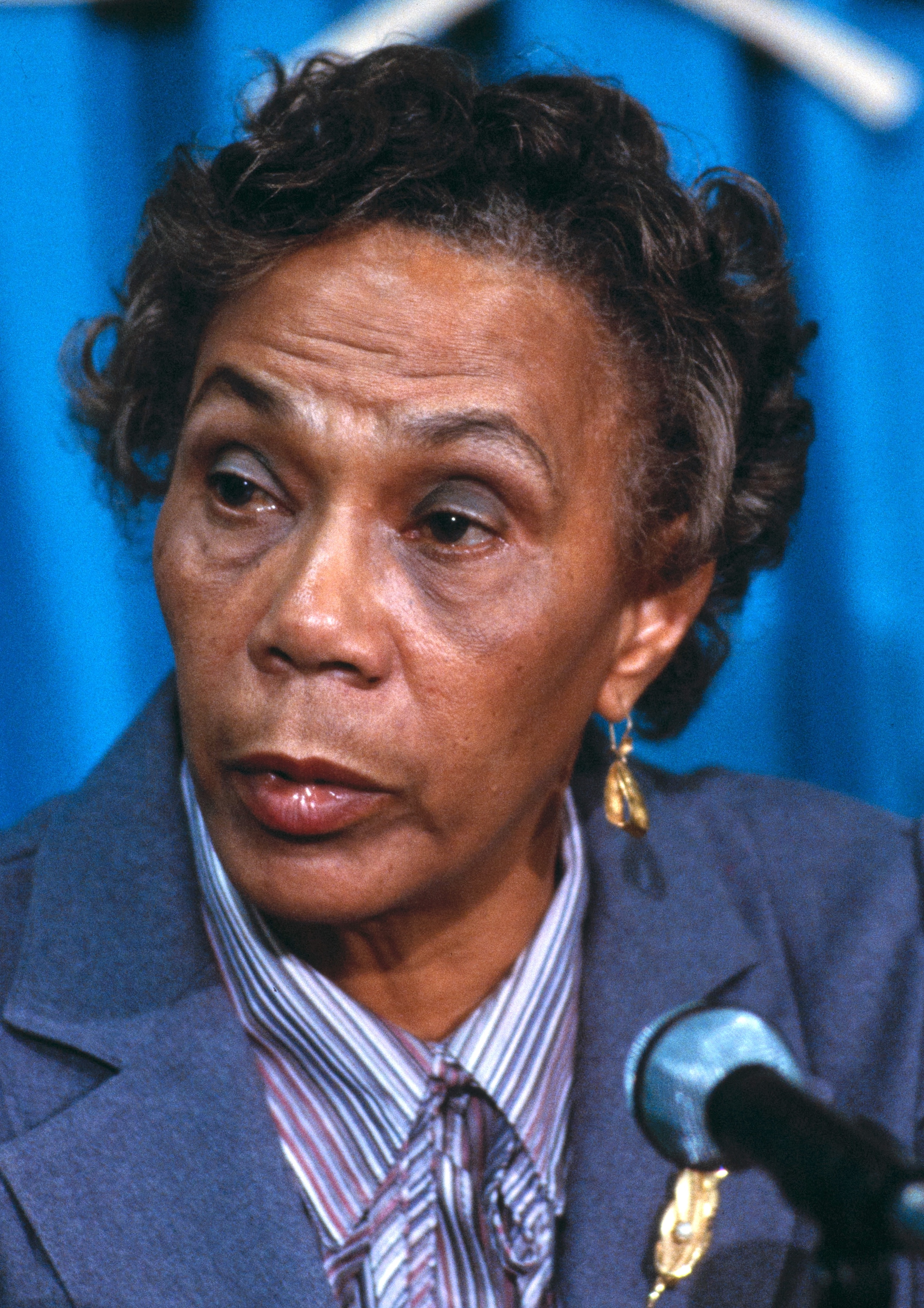

	First party	Second party	Third party
Leader	Eugenia Charles	Oliver Seraphin	Michael Douglas
Party	DFP	DLP	UDLP
Last election	51.34%, 17 seats	16.75%, 0 seats	–
Seats won	15	5	1
Seat change	▼2	▲5	New
Popular vote	18,865	13,014	558
Percentage	56.68%	39.10%	1.68%
Swing	▼5.34pp	▲22.35pp	New
- Results by constituency
Prime Minister before election
Eugenia Charles
DFP
Elected Prime Minister
Eugenia Charles
DFP

General elections were held in Dominica on 1 July 1985. The result was a victory for the Dominica Freedom Party, which won 15 of the 21 seats. Voter turnout was 74.6%.

== Results ==
Party	Votes	%	Seats	+/–
Dominica Freedom Party	18,865	56.68	15	–2
Dominica Labour Party	13,014	39.10	5	+5
United Dominica Labour Party	558	1.68	1	New
Dominica Progressive Force	78	0.23	0	New
Independents	766	2.30	0	–2
Total	33,281	100.00	21	0
Valid votes	33,281	99.15		
Invalid/blank votes	284	0.85		
Total votes	33,565	100.00		
Registered voters/turnout	45,018	74.56		
Source: Nohlen

=== List of elected members ===
Constituency	Party	Elected member
Castle Bruce	DLP	Eden Durand
Colihaut	DFP	Clem Shillingord
Cottage	DFP	Alleyne Carbon
Grand Bay	DLP	Pierre Charles
La Plaine	DFP	Heskeith Alexander
Mahaut	DFP	Brian Alleyne
Marigot	DFP	Pattison Stevens
Morne Jaune/Riviere Cyrique	DFP	Conrad Cyrus
Paix Bouche	UDLP	Rosie Douglas
Petite Savanne	DFP	Stanley Fadelle
Portsmouth	DLP	Michael Douglas
Roseau-Central	DFP	Eugenia Charles
Roseau-North	DFP	Allan Guye
Roseau-South	DFP	Ronan David
Roseau-Valley	DFP	Henry George
Salisbury	DFP	James Royer
Salybia	DFP	Ann Timothy
St. Joseph	DLP	Patrick John
Soufrière	DFP	Charles Maynard
Vieille Case	DFP	Alexis Williams
Wesley	DLP	Robert Elford Henry
Source: Electoral Office
