= Michael Douglas (politician) =

Dominican politician

Deputy Prime Minister of Dominica
- In office June 1979 – July 1980
- Prime Minister: Oliver Seraphin
- Preceded by: Henckell Christian
- Succeeded by: Anthony Moise

Personal details
- Party: Dominica Labour Party

Michael Douglas (1940 – 30 April 1992) was a politician from Dominica. He served as Member of Parliament for the Portsmouth constituency since 1975 and as well as a cabinet minister for a number of years, including as Minister of Finance from 1979 to 1980 and also Deputy Prime Minister.

Douglas was elected to the House of Assembly in the 1980 elections under the banner of Dominica Democratic Labour Party. Douglas formed United Dominica Labour Party in 1981. His party merged back with Dominica Labour Party in 1985. Douglas was then elected as the political leader of the Dominica Labour Party, and Leader of the Opposition from 1985 to 1990. He resigned from party leadership position in early 1992 due to an inoperable cancer. He was temporarily succeeded as party leader by the deputy leader Pierre Charles, until November 1992, when his brother Roosevelt Douglas was elected as the party chairman.

== Early and personal life ==
Douglas was born in 1940 in Portsmouth, which was then part of the British Leeward Islands. He was the son of a wealthy entrepreneur named Bernard Douglas who was previously a coconut farmer and a conservative politician. Douglas got a degree in mechanical engineering before joining the Dominica Labour Party.

He was brother to the Prime Minister of Dominica Roosevelt Douglas and father of current Cabinet Minister Ian Douglas.

== Political career ==
In March 1975 he was elected to the Dominica House of Assembly representing the Portsmouth constituency. Shortly after he was elected an MP, he was appointed Minister of Agriculture, Lands, Fisheries and Co-operatives in Patrick John's cabinet. The following year, 1976, during a government reshuffle, he became Minister of Communications, Works, and Hydraulics. However, he was dismissed by John afterwards, who accused Douglas of being a communist.

== Legacy ==
- Michael Douglas Boulevard in Portsmouth is named after him.
