= Thomas Etienne =

Dominican politician

Deputy Premier of Dominica
- In office July 1974 – 31 March 1975
- Premier: Patrick John
- Preceded by: Patrick John
- Succeeded by: Henckell Christian

Personal details
- Born: Thomas P. Etienne; 15 December 1930 LaRoche, Delices
- Died: 12 June 2025 (aged 94)
- Party: Dominica Labour Party; United Workers' Party

Thomas P. Etienne (15 December 1930 – 12 June 2025) was a Dominican politician and cabinet minister from Dominica Labour Party.

Etienne was born on 15 December 1930 in Delices. He studied in Dominica Grammar School, Woolwich Polytechnic, and other institutions in the United States, Trinidad, and Canada. He emigrated to England, and became an active trade unionist. He later returned to Dominica and worked as farmer.

In the 1970 elections Etienne won the House of Assembly seat for Southern District. Etienne was appointed Minister of Agriculture, Land, Fisheries and Trade in the cabinet of Edward Oliver LeBlanc from 1970 to 1974. In July 1974 he was appointed as Deputy Premier, and Minister of Agriculture, Trade and Natural Resources in the cabinet of Patrick John until he was sacked in March 1975.

Later Etienne was the first chairman and a founding member of the United Workers' Party (UWP), and one of the appointed UWP members of the House of Assembly of Dominica from 1990 to 1995.

He died on 12 June 2025.
