= The Prohibited and Unlawful Societies and Associations Act =

Law in Dominica

The Prohibited and Unlawful Societies and Associations Act, also known as The Dread Act, was a 1974 Dominica law that was designed to combat Rastafari.

== Origins ==
Rastafari was brought to Dominica in the early 1970s by students returning from studying abroad in the United States and Trinidad. The Rasta ideology spread through the ranks of educated young men and then down into the lower classes. Government officials became alarmed by the movement's anti-Catholic stance, use of marijuana and acceptance of socialism.

== Provisions ==
According to the law, adherents of Rastafari wearing their hair in dreadlocks (referred to as "Dreads") were subject to arrest without a warrant, were not permitted bail and could be held without charges for at least 48 hours. The law also prohibited the prosecution of any individual who killed or injured a "Dread" inside a place of residence.

== Legislative history ==
Prime Minister Patrick John and the Dominica Labour Party spearheaded the effort to pass the bill in the House of Assembly of Dominica. The bill was passed unopposed by members of the Dominica Freedom Party.

== Impact ==
As a result of the act, Dominica residents and law enforcement were granted immunity from prosecution for assaulting or murdering Rastafarians. During the years the act was in effect, Rastafarians were arrested, beaten and killed. Some sources also report that adherents had their dreadlocks forcibly cut off during this time, while others cut their own hair and left the movement to avoid persecution. Many Rastafarians fled into the rainforest to escape the effects of the Dread Act.

In 1975, the government announced an amnesty for "Dreads" living in the forests. However, these groups did not trust the government and refused to accept. The government then established an eight-person task force to decide on the matter. The committee, led by Reverend A. Didier, concluded that the majority of Dominica's "Dread" population was made up of peaceful activists and that the Dread Act should be annulled and replaced by a new law designed to combat terrorism. However, the government rejected the committee's findings.

== Repeal ==
Eugenia Charles voiced opposition to the bill shortly after it was passed, but took no steps to repeal it during her tenure as a House representative. When Charles became prime minister in 1980, she initially decided not to repeal the act. However, after "Dreads" living in the woods kidnapped a prominent citizen, the government decided to revamp the strict parameters of the Dread Act.

On February 16, 1981, the House of Assembly passed the Prevention of Terrorism Temporary Provisions Act, finally acting on the recommendation of the Didier Committee. Section 18 of the new legislation repealed the Dread Act.
