= UDLP =

UDLP may refer to:

- United Defense LP, former American defense company
- United Dominica Labour Party
