= Minister of Finance (Dominica) =

Minister of Finance of Dominica is the head of the Ministry of Finance (currently Ministry of Finance, Economic Development, Climate Resilience and Social Security). The Ministry of Finance is located on Kennedy Avenue, Roseau.

Name	Premier/Prime Minister	Took office	Left office	Notes
Frank Baron	Frank Baron	1960	January 1961	
Edward Oliver LeBlanc	Edward Oliver LeBlanc	January 1961	1970	
Ronald Armour	Edward Oliver LeBlanc	1970	July 1973	
Patrick John	Edward Oliver LeBlanc	1973	July 1974	
Victor Riviere	Patrick John	March 1975	June 1979	
Michael Douglas	Oliver Seraphin	June 1979	1980	
Eugenia Charles	Eugenia Charles	July 1980	February 1995	
Julius Timothy	Edison James	June 1995	February 2000	
Ambrose George	Rosie Douglas / Pierre Charles	February 2000	2001	
Pierre Charles	Pierre Charles	2001	2004	
Roosevelt Skerrit	Roosevelt Skerrit	January 2004	December 2022	
Irving McIntyre	Roosevelt Skerrit	December 2022	Incumbent	
