= Roseau South (Dominica constituency) =

Electoral district of Dominica

- Constituency for the House of Assembly of Dominica
- Electorate: 7,548 (2022)

Current constituency
- Party: Dominica Labour Party
- Representative: Chekira Lockhart Hypolite

Roseau South is one of the 21 electoral districts of the House of Assembly of Dominica. It contains the areas of Bath Estate, Elmshall, Giraudel, Kings Hill, Loubiere, Morne Bruce, and Newtown. It is currently represented by Dominica Labour Party MP Chekira Lockhart Hypolite.

== Electorate ==
The following is a list of the number of eligible voters in the Roseau South constituency at the time of each election provided by the Electoral Office of Dominica.

Year	Electorate	Notes
1980	2,464	
1985	2,848	
1990	4,254	
1995	4,974	
2000	5,200	
2005	6,038	
2014	6,962	
2019	7,503	
2022	7,548	

== List of representatives ==
Election	Years	Member	Party (Note: Indicates party the MP was running with during their election.)	Notes
1980	1980 – 1990	Ronan A. David	DFP	
1990	1990 – 2000	Ossie F. Walsh	DFP	
2000	2000 – 2014	Ambrose George	DLP	
2014	2014 – 2019	Joshua Francis	UWP	
2019	2019 –	Chekira Lockhart Hypolite	DLP	

== Electoral history ==
The following is a list of election results from the Electoral Office of Dominica. The election results lack spoiled and rejected ballots.

2009 Roseau South general election
Candidate	Party	Votes	%
Ambrose George	Dominica Labour Party	2,049	61.07
Bobby A. C. Frederick	United Workers' Party	1,130	33.68
Oliver A. St. John	Dominica Freedom Party	176	5.25
Total		3,355	100.00
DLP hold			

2014 Roseau South general election
Candidate	Party	Votes	%
Joshua Francis	United Workers' Party	2,185	52.87
Ambrose George	Dominica Labour Party	1,948	47.13
Total		4,133	100.00
UWP gain from DLP			

2019 Roseau South general election
Candidate	Party	Votes	%
Chekira Lockhart Hypolite	Dominica Labour Party	2,194	53.10
Joshua Francis	United Workers' Party	1,938	46.90
Total		4,132	100.00
DLP gain from UWP			

2022 Roseau South general election
Candidate	Party	Votes	%
Chekira Lockhart Hypolite	Dominica Labour Party	1,751	81.52
Wayne Norde	Independent	313	14.57
Davidson K. Julien	Independent	84	3.91
Total		2,148	100.00
DLP hold			
