= Ronald Armour =

Dominican politician (1940–2017)

Ronald O. P. Armour

Deputy Premier of Dominica
- In office 1970 – July 1973
- Premier: Edward Oliver LeBlanc
- Preceded by: Nicholson Ducreay
- Succeeded by: Patrick John

Personal details
- Born: Ronald Oliver Paul Armour; 17 June 1940
- Died: August 2017 (aged 77)
- Party: Dominica Labour Party
- Relations: Jenner Armour (brother)
- Nickname: R. O. P. Armour

Ronald Oliver Paul Armour (17 June 1940 – August 2017) was a Dominican politician and cabinet minister from Dominica Labour Party.

== Biography ==
=== Early life and education ===
Armour was born on 17 June 1940. He was Jenner Armour's brother. He graduated with a law degree from University of London in 1961 and with a diploma from London School of Economics in 1963, and then returned to Dominica and joined Dominica Labour Party.

=== Career ===
In the 1966 elections Armour won the House of Assembly seat for Roseau South. In March 1967 he was appointed minister of communications and works in the cabinet of Edward Oliver LeBlanc.

In the 1970 elections Armour won the seat for South Roseau. He was then appointed Deputy Premier by Edward Oliver LeBlanc from 1970 to July 1973. He was also Minister of Finance from 1970 to 13 July 1973, when he resigned from the cabinet under pressure from Patrick John. In July 1974 Armour ran to succeed Edward Oliver LeBlanc as the leader of Dominica Labour Party, but lost to Patrick John.

Armour lost his seat in the House of Assembly in the 1975 elections when he ran under the banner of Progressive Labour Party against DLP's Eustace Hazelwood Francis, who was a Patrick John's ally. That election ended his political career. He then practiced law in Portsmouth.

=== Death ===
He died on 6 August 2017 or 7 August 2017.
