= All Island Industrial and Farmers Party =

Political party in Dominica

The All Island Industrial and Farmers Party was a political party in Dominica. It contested the 1961 general elections, receiving 8% of the vote but failing to win a seat. It did not run in any subsequent elections.
