= Aurelius Marie =

Second President of Dominica (1904–1995)

2nd President of Dominica
- In office 25 February 1980 – 19 December 1983
- Prime Minister: Oliver Seraphin; Eugenia Charles
- Preceded by: Jenner B. M. Armour
- Succeeded by: Clarence Seignoret

Personal details
- Born: Aurelius John Lamothe Marie; 23 December 1904 Portsmouth, Dominica
- Died: 28 September 1995 (aged 90)

Aurelius John Lamothe Marie (23 December 1904 – 28 September 1995) was a Dominican politician and jurist who served as the second President of Dominica from 1980 to 1983.

== Political career ==
He served as a magistrate and jurist before his election. On 25 February 1980, the House of Assembly then elected Aurelius Marie as president. Marie took the Oath of Office the following day before Justice Cecil Hewlett. He served as president until 1983.
