= Deputy Prime Minister of Dominica =

- Coat of arms of Dominica

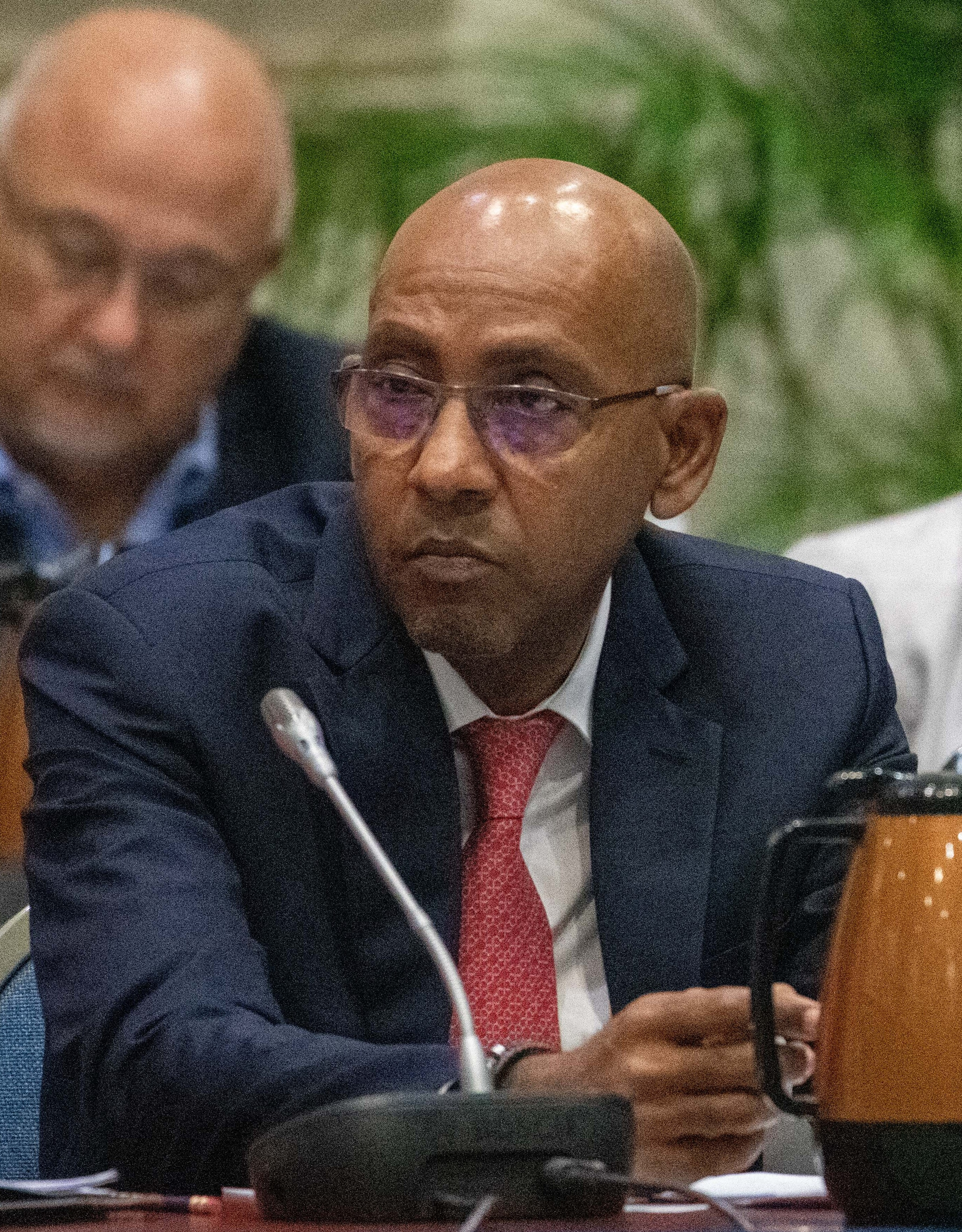
- Incumbent; Irving McIntyre since 13 December 2022
- Appointer: Prime Minister of Dominica

Deputy Prime Minister of Dominica is an informal cabinet-level position in Dominica. The position is not outlined in the Constitution of Dominica.

The deputy prime minister is appointed by the prime minister. The tasks have been outlined as ... who shall not only act as Prime Minister in my absence from the country, but who shall also be tasked with several administrative functions in the harnessing and coordination of the various ministries.

== Deputy Premiers 1967-1978 ==
Name	Premier	Took office	Left office	Notes
Nicholson Ducreay	Edward Oliver LeBlanc	March 1967	1970	
Ronald Armour	Edward Oliver LeBlanc	1970	July 1973	
Patrick John	Edward Oliver LeBlanc	July 1973	July 1974	
Thomas Etienne	Patrick John	July 1974	31 March 1975	
Henckell Christian	Patrick John	31 March 1975	November 1978	

== Deputy Prime Ministers ==
Name	Prime Minister	Took office	Left office	Notes
Henckell Christian	Patrick John	November 1978	June 1979	
Michael Douglas	Oliver Seraphin	June 1979	July 1980	
Anthony Moise	Eugenia Charles	July 1980	1985	
Charles Maynard	Eugenia Charles	1985	1991 - ?	
?	Eugenia Charles	1991 - ?	June 1995	
Julius Timothy	Edison James	June 1995	February 2000	
Vacant	Rosie Douglas	February 2000	October 2000	
Vacant	Pierre Charles	October 2000	January 2004	
Vacant	Osborne Riviere	January 2004	January 2004	
Vacant	Roosevelt Skerrit	January 2004	11 April 2018	
Reginald Austrie	Roosevelt Skerrit	11 April 2018	17 December 2019	
Vacant	Roosevelt Skerrit	17 December 2019	13 December 2022	
Irving McIntyre	Roosevelt Skerrit	13 December 2022	Incumbent	

== See also ==
- Prime Minister of Dominica
