= Emmanuel Christopher Loblack =

Dominican trade unionist (1898–1995)

Emmanuel Christopher Loblack OBE
- Born: 29 August 1898; Grand Bay, Dominica
- Died: 3 June 1995 (aged 96)
- Organisations: Dominica Trade Union; Dominica Labour Party; Dominica Freedom Party

Emmanuel Christopher Loblack OBE (29 August 1898 – 3 June 1995) was a Dominican trade unionist and politician.

== Trade union ==
Loblack was raised in the community of Grand Bay, Dominica, where he was born in 1898. He was a mason and builder by trade; he was employed by the Public Works Department in 1939, and this job was the impetus that would begin his long political career.

In 1939, Loblack met with London's Moyne Commission, who were visiting the island to investigate conditions in Dominica. He, along with several other people, appeared before the commission and took its members to view areas of Roseau. He made complaints about wage rates and the working conditions that tenant farmers were working in. One member of the commission, Lord Citrine, encouraged the establishment of a trade union, which he had also suggested done in other territories.

On 11 January 1945, Loblack, with the assistance of Austin Winston and Ralph Nicholls, launched the Dominica Trade Union. The union grew quickly, largely through changing work hours of most Dominicans from 6 a.m.–6 p.m. to 8:00 a.m.–4:00 p.m. It soon grew to 26 branches around the island.

As leader of this trade union, Loblack, represented Dominica in Britain at the International Confederation of Trade Unions in 1949. It was at this meeting that Loblack successfully lobbied for electricity, bridges, and roads, which were all needed in many parts of the country.

== Political career ==
In May 1955, with longtime Dominican political activist Phyllis Shand Allfrey, he created the Dominica Labour Party. However, at the same time, the visions of new Trade Union members and Loblack began to differ, and in 1957 he left.

His perseverance and commitment towards the Dominica Labour Party garnered him a nominated seat in the legislative council when the Dominica Labour Party won the 1961 general elections. However, with the expulsion of co-founder of the party Phyllis Shand Allfrey, in September 1962 Loblack removed himself from the party.

In 1968, with much political clout Loblack, along with Edward Scobie, Anthony Moise, Mary Eugenia Charles, and several others founded the Dominica Freedom Party, and were known as Freedomites.

== Late career and death ==
For the final 27 years of his life, Loblack championed for the success of the Dominica Freedom Party. He received a Meritorious Service Award from the State and a Certificate of Commendation from the University of the West Indies. With his death Dominica also recognized his outstanding achievements and Loblack was given a state funeral on 10 June 1995. To honour his achievements and vision, the government of Dominica renamed Dominica's Roseau East Bridge to the E.C. Loblack Bridge.
