= Denise Charles-Pemberton =

Politician in Dominica

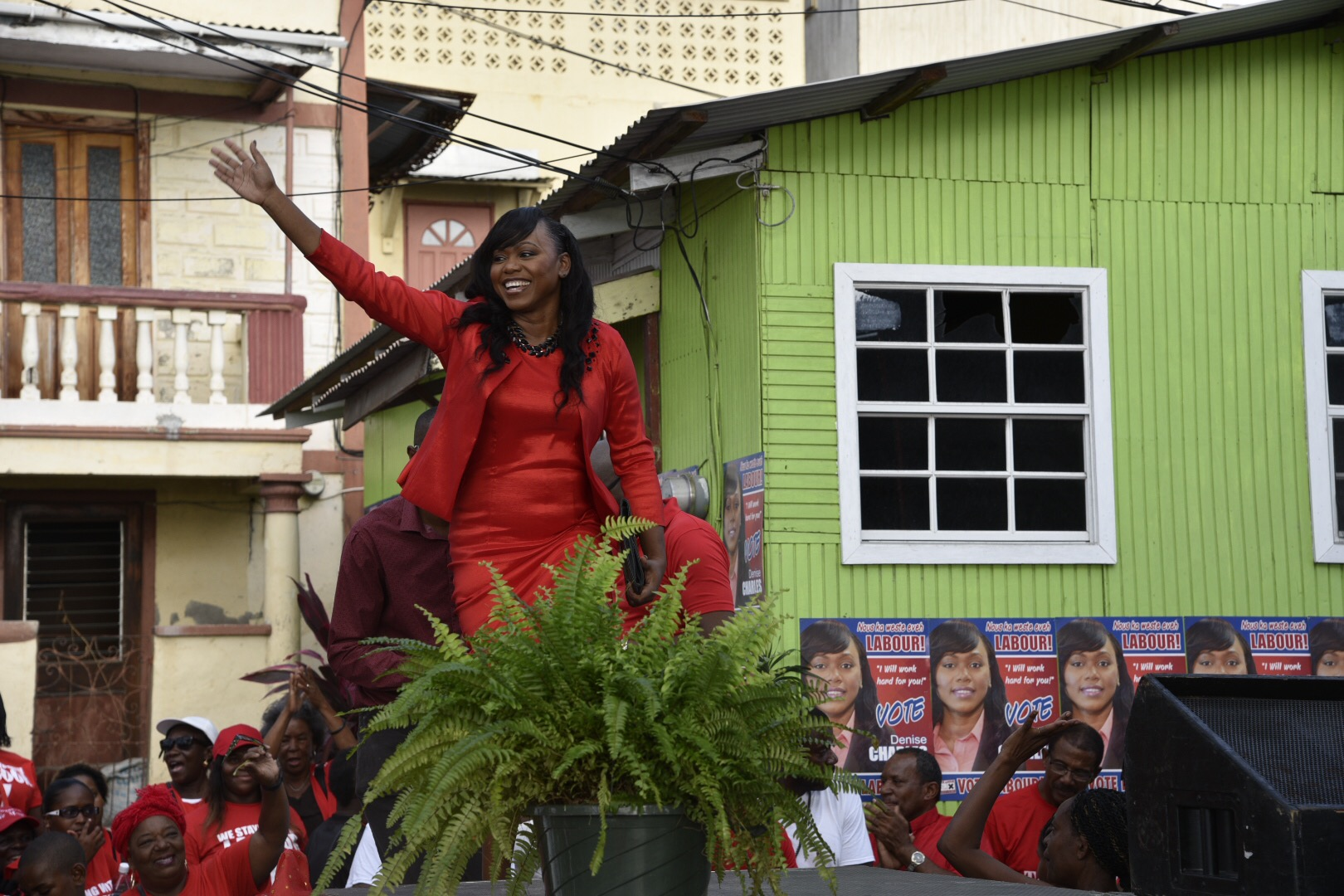

Minister for Tourism, International Transport and Maritime Initiatives
- Incumbent
- Assumed office 2019

Member of Parliament for Soufriere
- Incumbent
- Assumed office 2016
- Preceded by: Ian Pinard

Chair of the Organisation of Eastern Caribbean States Council Of Ministers Of Tourism
- Incumbent
- Assumed office 2022

Personal details
- Party: Dominica Labour Party
- Spouse: Daniel Pemberton

Denise Charles-Pemberton, formerly Denise Charles, is a politician from Dominica, who in 2019 was appointed Minister for Tourism, International Transport and Maritime Initiatives for the Government of Dominica. Key issues for her ministry to address is the recovery of the country's tourism sector after the impact of COVID-19, as well as the impact of climate change.

On 21 July 2022, Charles was appointed Chair of the Organisation of Eastern Caribbean States Council Of Ministers Of Tourism. A former accountant, Charles first stood for parliament in 2016, retaining the constituency for the Dominica Labour Party with 70% of the vote. She is Member of Parliament for Soufriere Constituency. She was re-elected in 2019.

In November 2023, she married and took the name of Denise Charles-Pemberton.
