= Peasant and Workers Movement =

Defunct political party in Dominica

The Peasant and Workers Movement was a political party in Dominica. It contested the 1961 general elections, receiving only 3% of the vote and failing to win a seat. It did not run in any subsequent elections.
