= 1970 Dominican general election =

Election in Dominica

General elections were held in Dominica on 26 October 1970. Prior to the elections, the ruling Dominica Labour Party split, with a faction led by Prime Minister Edward Oliver LeBlanc contesting the elections as the 'LeBlanc Labour Party' and the other faction contesting under the DLP name and led by N.A.N. Ducreay. The LeBlanc faction won 8 of the 11 seats. Voter turnout was 82%.

== Results ==
Party	Votes	%	Seats	+/–
LeBlanc Labour Party	9,877	49.95	8	–
Dominica Freedom Party	7,578	38.32	2	New
Dominica Labour Party	1,387	7.01	1	–
Independents	933	4.72	0	0
Total	19,775	100.00	11	0
Valid votes	19,775	93.62		
Invalid/blank votes	1,347	6.38		
Total votes	21,122	100.00		
Registered voters/turnout	25,899	81.56		
Source: Caribbean Elections

=== List of elected members ===
Constituency	Party	Elected member
Eastern	LLP	Henckell Christian
Northern	LLP	J. L. Royer
North-Eastern	DLP	W. S. Stevens
North-Western	LLP	Edward Oliver LeBlanc
Portsmouth	LLP	E. A. Leslie
Roseau-Northern	LLP	Patrick John
Roseau-Southern	LLP	Ronald Armour
Southern	DFP	Ralph Stanley Fadelle
South-Eastern	LLP	Thomas Etienne
South-Western	DFP	Anthony Moise
Western	LLP	E. J. Shillingford
Source: Electoral Office
