= Jenner Armour =

Dominican barrister and politician

Jenner B. M. Armour
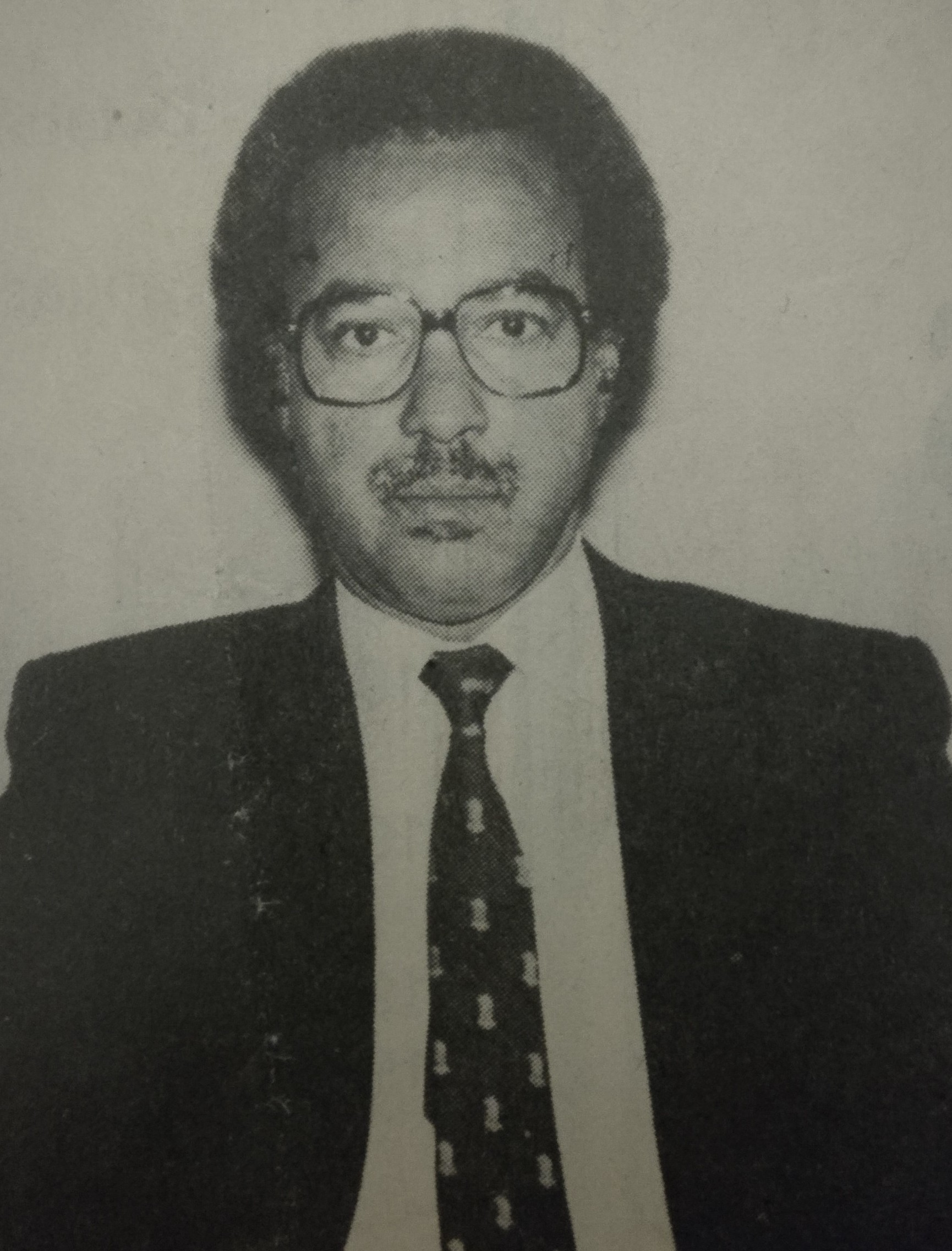

President of Dominica (acting)
- In office 21 June 1979 – 25 February 1980
- Prime Minister: Oliver Seraphin
- Preceded by: Louis Cools-Lartigue (acting)
- Succeeded by: Aurelius Marie

Personal details
- Born: Jenner Bourne Maude Armour; 15 November 1932 Portsmouth, Dominica
- Died: 25 July 2001 (aged 68)
- Party: Progressive Labour Party; Dominica Freedom Party
- Relations: Ronald Armour (brother)

Jenner Bourne Maude Armour (15 November 1932 – 25 July 2001) was a politician and barrister from Dominica who served as the interim (acting) President of Dominica from 1979 to 1980.

== Biography ==
Armour was born in Portsmouth, Dominica to Trinidadian father Dr. Reginald F. Armour and his wife Margery (née Bryant). He was Ronald Armour's brother. He earned a Master of Laws degree in 1959 at the University of London and began practice in 1960. He was a barrister for over 40 years and worked in other countries such as Saint Kitts and Nevis, Trinidad and Tobago, Anguilla. He led Progressive Labour Party following its split from Dominica Labour Party.

Following a constitutional crisis and the departure of president Fred Degazon, he became an interim head of state. After Degazon's formal resignation in February 1980, he turned his function over to newly elected Aurelius Marie. He then served as a minister in the government of Eugenia Charles. In 1985 he became deputy speaker of parliament. He was elected as a member of House of Assembly of Dominica as a candidate of Dominica Freedom Party and Dominica's Attorney General between 1990 and 1995. Jenner B. M. Armour died on 25 July 2001 at the age of 68.
