= Henckell Christian =

Dominican politician (1910–1998)

Deputy Prime Minister of Dominica
- In office November 1978 – 16 June 1979
- Prime Minister: Patrick John
- Succeeded by: Michael Douglas

Deputy Premier of Dominica
- In office 31 March 1975 – November 1978
- Premier: Patrick John
- Preceded by: Thomas Etienne

Personal details
- Born: Henckell Lochinvar Christian; 1910
- Died: 1998 (aged 87–88)
- Party: Dominica Labour Party
- Children: Pearle Christian
- Relatives: Lemuel McPherson Christian (brother)
- Education: London University

Henckell Lochinvar Christian MBE (1910 – 1998) was a Dominican politician from the Dominica Labour Party.

== Biography ==
H. L. Christian studied sociology at the University of London. He worked as a teacher and later as a social worker.

Christian was elected to the House of Assembly of Dominica in 1970 and 1975. He was minister of education and health in the 1970s in the cabinet of Edward Oliver LeBlanc. Patrick John appointed him as the Deputy Premier in 1975, and Christian continued as the Deputy Prime Minister since independence in November 1978. He resigned alongside acting president Sir Louis Cools-Lartigue on 16 June 1979.

Christian published his memoirs (1920–1992) Gatecrashing into the Unknown in 1992.

Married to Muriel, née Mathew, H. L. Christian was the father of Pearle Christian (third of the couple's four daughters), and the brother of Lemuel McPherson Christian, the composer of Dominica's national anthem "Isle of Beauty, Isle of Splendour".
