= Dominica Liberation Movement Alliance =

Political party in Dominica

The Dominica Liberation Movement Alliance was a political party in Dominica. It contested the 1980 general elections, receiving 8.4% of the vote but failing to win a seat. It did not contest any subsequent elections. The party merged with Dominica Labour Party in 1985.
