= Ian Pinard =

Dominican politician (1971/1972–2026)

Ian Pinard (1971 or 1972 – 17 April 2026) was a Dominican politician. He was elected in 2005 to parliament and did not run again in 2009. In 2014, he was again elected to parliament and was appointed a government minister. In 2016, he resigned first as minister then as MP in response to allegations of inappropriate relations with a minor.

== Life and career ==
Ian Pinard was born in either 1971 or 1972.

Pinard was first elected to the House of Assembly in the 2005 election. He was elected to represent the Soufrière constituency on the ruling Dominica Labour Party (DLP) ticket. In 2009, Pinard declined to seek re-election due to health-related reasons. Sam Martin succeeded him in parliament.

He was elected to parliament again in the 2014 election. His candidacy was endorsed by Martin. On 12 December 2014, Pinard was sworn in as minister for public works and ports. On 2 March 2016, Pinard resigned as government minister due to, as Caribbean360 explained, "allegations that he had inappropriate conduct with an under-aged girl." The Sun Dominica described the incident as a "sex scandal" and as "an alleged relationship with a schoolgirl." On 26 April, Pinard also resigned as MP due to the same allegations. Pinard had been arrested in relation to the allegations and subsequently went on bail. Following his resignation, Prime Minister Roosevelt Skerrit publicly announced he "vowed to stand by" Pinard despite the allegations, as reported by Dominica News Online.

In the by-election which resulted from Pinard's resignation, Denise Charles was chosen as the DLP candidate. She had previously worked on Pinard's campaign. On 15 May, Pinard endorsed Charles's candidacy. He also worked on her campaign. The opposition United Workers' Party focused their campaign on the issue of child abuse due to the allegations surrounding Pinard. Charles was ultimately elected.

After resigning, he served as acting general manager at Petro Caribe Dominica. In November 2024, Pinard was elected as vice president of the DLP. In December 2024, Pinard was appointed CEO of the Dominica Air and Sea Ports Authority.

Pinard died on 17 April 2026, at the age of 54. His funeral was held in Pointe Michel on 8 May, which was declared a national day of mourning.
