= Dominica Democratic Party =

Political party in Dominica

The Dominica Democratic Party was a political party in Dominica. It contested the 1961 general elections, receiving only 125 votes (0.8%) and failing to win a seat. It did not run in any subsequent elections.
