= 2016 Soufrière by-election =

By-election in Dominica

The 2016 Soufrière by-election was held on 7 June. It was triggered by the resignation of Ian Pinard. The election was won by ruling party candidate Denise Charles.

== Background ==
Ian Pinard was first elected to the House of Assembly in the 2005 election, to represent the Soufrière constituency. He gave up the seat in 2009 due to health reasons, but was again elected to it in 2014. On 2 March 2016, Pinard resigned as ports and public works minister due to, as Caribbean360 explained, "allegations that he had inappropriate conduct with an under-aged girl." The Sun Dominica described the incident as a "sex scandal". On 26 April, Pinard also resigned as MP due to the same allegations. Pinard had been arrested in relation to the allegations and subsequently went on bail. On 9 May, Prime Minister Roosevelt Skerrit announced that the resultant by-election would be held on 7 June.

By 28 April, news had reported that Denise Charles had been tipped to run on the ruling Dominica Labour Party (DLP) ticket. She was elected to be the DLP nominee on 9 May. Charles was an accountant from Pointe Michel. She had worked on Pinard's campaign before 2014. The DLP launched Charles's candidacy on 14 May in Pointe Michel. She was endorsed by Pinard on 15 May. By 10 May, Hidges "Higgs" Adams was selected as the candidate for the opposition United Workers' Party (UWP). He had unsuccessfully contested the seat in the 2014 election. Candidate nomination day was 20 May.

The UWP held a major campaign rally in Pointe Michel on 21 May. The UWP asked supporters ahead of the event to wear purple as a symbol against child abuse. At the rally, UWP Leader Lennox Linton called for the DLP to drop out of the race after Pinard had "disgraced" the constituency. The UWP's campaign for the by-election centered on the issue of child abuse, due to the allegations against Pinard.

It was reported that the DLP expended more resources than the UWP on the by-election campaign. Dominica News Online said the DLP had "poured resources into the constituency in the run-up to the polls." Linton described the DLP tactic as using taxpayer money for "blatant vote buying." The Sun Dominica reported that Charles was expected to win over Adams.

Chief Elections Officer Steven LaRocque said there had been 50 new voter registrations ahead of the by-election.

== Aftermath ==
The election was held on 7 June. Preliminary results showed Charles had won with 1,342 votes to Adams's 560. Charles was sworn in on 27 June.

== Results ==
The following are the results for the 2016 by-election from the Electoral Office.

2016 Soufrière by-election
Candidate	Party	Votes	%
Denise Charles	Dominica Labour Party	1,345	70.53
Hidges Adams	United Workers' Party	562	29.47
Total		1,907	100.00
Valid votes		1,907	98.55
Invalid/blank votes		28	1.45
Total votes		1,935	100.00
Registered voters/turnout		3,431	56.40
DLP hold			
