= 1980 Dominican general election =

Election in Dominica

- 21 July 1980

21 of the 30 seats in the House of Assembly 11 seats needed for a majority
- Registered: 38,452
- Turnout: 80.21% (▲1.25pp)
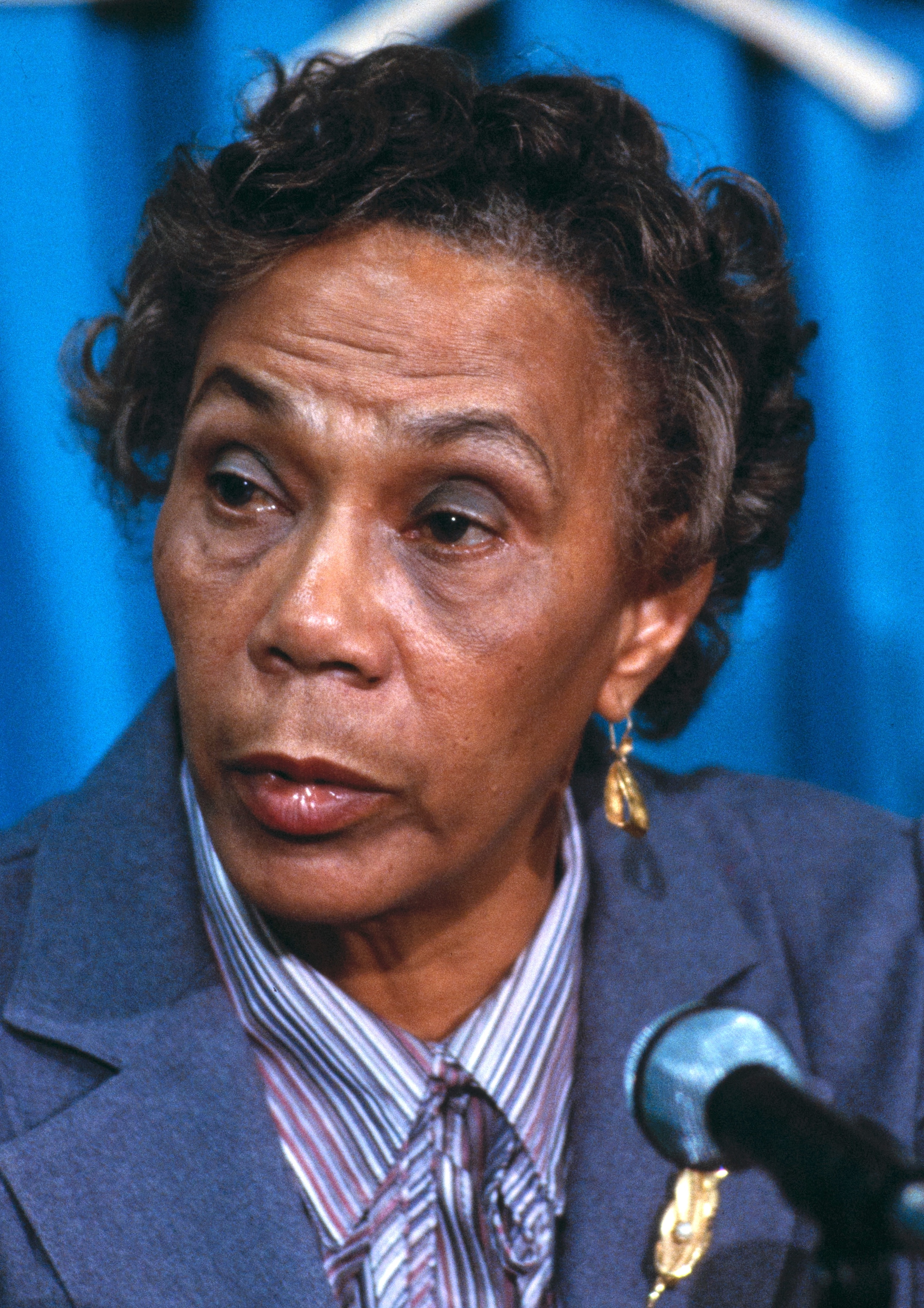

	First party	Second party	Third party
Leader	Eugenia Charles	Oliver Seraphin	Patrick John
Party	DFP	DDLP	DLP
Last election	32.43%, 3 seats	–	49.32%, 16 seats
Seats won	17	2	0
Seat change	▲14	New	▼16
Popular vote	15,706	6,034	5,126
Percentage	51.34%	19.72%	16.75%
Swing	▲18.91pp	New	▼32.57pp
- Results by constituency
Prime Minister before election
Oliver Seraphin
DDLP
Elected Prime Minister
Eugenia Charles
DFP

General elections were held in Dominica on 21 July 1980. The result was a victory for the Dominica Freedom Party, which won 17 of the 21 seats, whilst the ruling Dominica Labour Party lost all 16 seats after nineteen years in power. Voter turnout was 80.2%.

== Results ==
Party	Votes	%	Seats	+/–
Dominica Freedom Party	15,706	51.34	17	+14
Dominica Democratic Labour Party	6,034	19.72	2	New
Dominica Labour Party	5,126	16.75	0	–16
Dominica Liberation Movement Alliance	2,575	8.42	0	New
Independents	1,154	3.77	2	0
Total	30,595	100.00	21	0
Valid votes	30,595	99.20		
Invalid/blank votes	247	0.80		
Total votes	30,842	100.00		
Registered voters/turnout	38,452	80.21		
Source: Nohlen

=== List of elected members ===
Constituency	Party	Elected member
Castle Bruce	DFP	Oliver A. Sanderson
Colihaut	DFP	Alvin Armantrading
Cottage	DFP	Alleyne J. Carbon
Grand Bay	DFP	Judiana Henderson
La Plaine	DFP	Heskeith Alexander
Mahaut	DFP	Brian Alleyne
Marigot	DFP	Pattison A. S. Stevens
Morne Jaune/Riviere Cyrique	IND	Conrad W. Cyrus
Paix Bouche	IND	Jenner Armour
Petite Savanne	DFP	Ralph S. Fadelle
Portsmouth	DDLP	Michael Douglas
Roseau-Central	DFP	Eugenia Charles
Roseau-North	DFP	Henry G. Dyer
Roseau-South	DFP	Ronan A. David
Roseau-Valley	DFP	Henry George
Salisbury	DFP	Dennison John
Salybia	DDLP	Matthew Joseph
St. Joseph	DFP	Kelleb Laurent
Soufrière	DFP	Anthony Moise
Vieille Case	DFP	Alexis E. Williams
Wesley	DFP	Kenneth Williams
Source: Electoral Office
