= Frank Baron (politician) =

Dominican politician (1923–2016)

Chief Minister of Dominica

Personal details
- Born: Franklin Andrew Merrifield Baron; 19 January 1923
- Died: 9 April 2016
- Children: Francine Baron
- Parent: A. A. Baron (father)

Franklin Andrew Merrifield Baron (19 January 1923 – 9 April 2016) was the first Chief Minister of Dominica.

When the ministerial system of government was introduced in Dominica in March 1956, Baron was appointed as Minister for Trade and Production. In 1957 he founded the Dominica United People's Party (DUPP).

Baron became the first Chief Minister of Dominica and Minister for Finance in January 1960. When he lost his seat in the 1961 elections, he quit active politics and returned to private business for tourism and real estate.

He was the son of Alexander Arthur "A. A." Baron, who served on the legislative council from 1925 into the 1930s.

Baron's daughter Francine Baron is the current Minister of Foreign and CARICOM Affairs of Dominica.

== See also ==
- List of heads of government of Dominica
