= Dominica Public Service Union =

Dominican trade union

DPSU
- Dominica Public Service Union
- "Strength of Many, The Power of One"
- Founded: 1939
- Type: Trade union
- Headquarters: Roseau
- Location: Dominica
- Field: Public sector
- Key people: Steve Joseph, president
- Affiliations: CTUC
- Website: dpsu.org

The Dominica Public Service Union is a trade union in Dominica. It was founded in 1939 as the Dominica Civil Service Association, registering as a trade union in 1961.
