= Ambrose George =

Dominican politician and cabinet minister

Ambrose George is a Dominican politician and cabinet minister. He is the deputy leader of the Dominica Labour Party.

George is an agricultural engineer. He was elected as a member of the House of Assembly of Dominica for the Roseau South Constituency in February 2000. He lost his seat in the 2014 elections.

George served as Minister of Finance from 2000 to 2001 In November 2008, Prime Minister Roosevelt Skerritt announced a cabinet reshuffle in which George was not included. He was replaced by the MP for the Mahaut constituency Hon. Rayburn Blackmore as Minister of Public Works and Infrastructural Development. He served as Minister of Public Works and Infrastructural Development in 2010. He also held the portfolios of minister of agriculture, public works and infrastructural development. He was also acting Prime Ministers on several occasions (before the appointment of Deputy Prime Minister).

He was appointed as the ambassador to Venezuela in 2019.
