= Dominica Trade Union =

Trade union in Dominica

DTU
- Dominica Trade Union
- Founded: 1945
- Headquarters: Roseau, Dominica
- Location: Dominica
- Key people: Harold Sealy, president Leo J. Bernard Nicholas, general secretary
- Affiliations: ITUC

The Dominica Trade Union (DTU) is a trade union in Dominica. Founded in 1945 by Emmanuel Christopher Loblack, the DTU has declined from membership of 8000 down to several hundred members. It is affiliated with the International Trade Union Confederation.
