= Premier of Dominica =

The Premier of Dominica was responsible for chairing Cabinet meetings in Dominica following the passage of the West Indies Associated States Act. Under this act, the Cabinet had responsibility for domestic affairs, while foreign affairs were determined out of London.

The Premier was appointed by the Governor. Edward Oliver LeBlanc and Patrick John both held the position. The position of Premier was succeeded by that of Prime Minister upon Dominica's independence, on 3 November 1978.
