= Anthony Moise =

Dominican politician (1905/06–??)

Deputy Prime Minister of Dominica
- In office July 1980 – 1985
- Prime Minister: Eugenia Charles
- Preceded by: Michael Douglas
- Succeeded by: Charles Maynard

Personal details
- Party: Dominica Freedom Party

Anthony Moise was a Dominican politician and cabinet minister from Dominica Freedom Party.

Moise was 74 years old in August 1980, so he was born about 1905–1907. He was a farmer and builder from the southern village of Soufrière.

Moise was first elected to the Legislative Council of Dominica in 1961 as an independent and 1966 as a Dominica United People's Party candidate. He was one of the founders of Dominica Freedom Party in 1968. He was elected to the House of Assembly in 1970 under the banner of Dominica Freedom Party. In 1975 and 1980 he was re-elected from Soufrière constituency. Moise was appointed the Leader of the Opposition from 1970 until April 1975 when he was replaced by Eugenia Charles.

When Eugenia Charles became Prime Minister of Dominica, Moise was appointed Deputy Prime Minister in July 1980. He served until 1985, when he stood down and was succeeded in Soufrière constituency by Charles Maynard.
