= Progressive Labour Party (Dominica) =

Political party in Dominica

The Progressive Labour Party was a political party in Dominica. It contested the 1975 general elections, receiving 4% of the vote, but failing to win a seat. The party was led by Jenner Armour. It did not run in any subsequent elections.
