= United Dominica Labour Party =

Political party in Dominica

The United Dominica Labour Party (UDLP) was a political party in Dominica.

== History ==
The party was formed by Michael Douglas in 1981 as a split from the Dominica Labour Party. It contested the 1985 general elections, receiving 1.7% of the vote and winning one seat, with Rosie Douglas elected in Paix Bouche. Later in the same year the party merged back into Dominica Labour Party (DLP), with UDLP leader Michael Douglas becoming DLP leader the following year.
