= Waterfront and Allied Workers' Union =

Dominican trade union

WAWU
- Waterfront and Allied Workers' Union
- Headquarters: Roseau, Dominica
- Location: Dominica
- Members: 1000
- Key people: Kertist Augustus, president
- Affiliations: ITUC

The Waterfront and Allied Workers' Union (WAWU) is a trade union in Dominica. It is affiliated with the International Trade Union Confederation.
