= Patrick John =

Dominican politician (1938–2021)

Patrick Roland John

1st Prime Minister of Dominica
- In office 3 November 1978 – 21 June 1979
- President: Fred Degazon
- Deputy: Henckell Christian
- Preceded by: Office created
- Succeeded by: Oliver Seraphin (interim)

Premier of Dominica
- In office 28 July 1974 – 2 November 1978
- Deputy: Thomas Etienne; Henckell Christian
- Preceded by: Edward LeBlanc

Deputy Premier of Dominica
- In office July 1973 – July 1974
- Premier: Edward Oliver LeBlanc
- Preceded by: Ronald Armour
- Succeeded by: Thomas Etienne

Personal details
- Born: 7 January 1938 Roseau, Dominica
- Died: 6 July 2021 (aged 83) Roseau, Dominica
- Party: Dominica Labour Party
- Spouse: Desiree Johnson

Patrick Roland John (7 January 1938 – 6 July 2021) was the first Prime Minister of Dominica as well as its last Premier. He led Dominica to independence from the United Kingdom. He was leader of the Waterfront and Allied Workers' Union and mayor of Roseau before being elected to the legislature in 1970. He became Premier in 1974 following the resignation of Edward Oliver LeBlanc. After mass protest forced him to resign, John unsuccessfully attempted in 1981 to overthrow the government of Prime Minister Eugenia Charles with the backing of white supremacist groups (in what became dubbed "Operation Red Dog"). As a result, he was jailed for twelve years, of which he served five years.

On 6 July 2021, John died at the Dominica China Friendship Hospital in Roseau, Dominica, at the age of 83.

== Premiership (1974–1978) ==
John was elected to the House of Assembly from Roseau North Electoral District / Roseau North Constituency from 1 November 1970. He was appointed Deputy Premier and Minister of Finance in 1973. After the resignation of Edward O. LeBlanc in 1974, John succeeded him as Premier of Dominica. The Labour Party administration led by John founded Dominica's National Commercial & Development Bank, and rid the capital city of Roseau of many shanty-type dwellings and replaced them with modern housing developments at Bath Estate and River Estate. John's government also opened a new deepwater harbour at Fond Cole and started the Dominica Social Security system.

However, division grew in Dominica following the murder of a number of tourists in the mid-1970s and the emergence of a black power movement. John introduced legislation so broadly drawn that it even regulated acceptable modes of dress. Later, he indicated that revolutionary groups would not be tolerated. His reign as Premier and Prime Minister was regarded as one of the most tumultuous periods in Dominica's history. He was responsible for the infamous Prohibited and Undesirable Societies Act or "Dread Act", which was passed in 1974 and was meant to combat the lawlessness of countless Dominican youth. That act made it legal to arrest any "Dread" without a warrant and deny bail to anyone wearing "a badge of the society" i.e. dreadlocks.

== Prime Ministership (1978–1979) ==
John became the first Prime Minister of Dominica on 3 November 1978 when the country was granted independence from Britain.

John was the honorary commander of Dominica's 80-strong defense force and was in favor of a mixed economy. Internationally, he showed interest in development that saw the island's future linked with the West. One of his first acts after independence was to establish diplomatic relations with South Korea.

=== Crisis phase and resignation ===
Sentiment against the Labour Party government led by John continued to grow after the implementation of the Dread Act. On 29 May 1979, John's attempts to quell opposition to his leadership led to a clash outside parliament in which a young man named Phillip Timothy and another individual were killed, and a dozen others wounded. Resistance to his rule strengthened as public servants went on strike and the country was completely shut down. The Committee for National Salvation, led by Charles Savarin, called for a general strike and the resignation of John and the government.

One by one, Labour Party parliamentarians resigned their positions in the cabinet and they were often aided by a rain of stones from protesters. The first Labour Party minister to resign was Oliver Seraphin who then went on to become interim Prime Minister until elections in July 1980. On June 11, 1979, President Frederick Degazon fled to Britain. John was voted out of office by the House of Assembly on June 20, 1979, and the general strike ended the next day.

== Later political life ==
John led the rump Labour Party in the 1980 general election, however, he lost his seat in the Dominica House of Assembly.

Dominica Democratic Labour Party merged back to Labour Party in 1983, and Oliver Seraphin was elected party leader and John as his deputy. He was replaced as deputy party leader by Seraphin in 1985. John was elected again into the House of Assembly from St. Joseph constituency, from 1 July 1985 to 20 February 1986. He was jailed in February 1986. He resigned from the Labour party in 1988, claiming that it was exploiting him. He was freed from jail after the 1990 Dominican general election.

== Coup attempt ==
In 1981 John was among seven individuals including former commander of the DDF Major Frederick Newton, who were arrested for alleged plots to overthrow the government. That year there were two attempted coups d'état. Disaffected Dominica Defense Force (DDF) members, aided by a group of Dreads (Rastafarians) near Giraudel, and foreign mercenaries sought to overthrow the duly elected Dominica Freedom Party government led by Prime Minister Mary Eugenia Charles. The attempts at a coup d'état were discovered, thwarted, and the plotters both in Dominica and the United States were exposed.

Under emergency powers, John and others were arrested in 1981 for their involvement in Operation Red Dog, which had the aim of restoring John to power with the aid of Canadian and American citizens, largely affiliated with white supremacist and Ku Klux Klan groups. In court cases which followed, the trial judge found that John was initially released, but the State appealed and the Court of Appeal ordered a new trial to take place. On October 23, 1985, John was found guilty and sentenced to 12 years' imprisonment for conspiring to overthrow the government. John was later pardoned by the same Prime Minister Mary Eugenia Charles he sought to overthrow, and he was released from prison on May 29, 1990.

== Sports ==
Following his release from prison, John, formerly a member of the Dominica national football team, became a local football administrator. In 1992, he was elected President of the Dominica Football Association (DFA). Under his leadership the DFA became a FIFA affiliate in 1994. He served as President until 2006, when he was voted out of office by the local football fraternity. In 2007, he was inducted into the CONCACAF Hall of Fame. In May 2008, he was re-elected as President of the DFA. The DFA administrative headquarters is named "Patrick John Football House" in honour of him. In November 2011, John was banned by FIFA from the sport for two years and fined $3,300, for his part in an alleged bribery scheme involving FIFA presidential candidate Mohamed bin Hammam.

== See also ==
- Luciano Bivar

| Preceded by Edward Oliver LeBlanc | Premier of Dominica; July 28, 1974 to November 2, 1978 | Succeeded by Himself as Prime Minister |
| Preceded by Himself as Premier | Prime Minister of Dominica; November 3, 1978 to June 21, 1979 | Succeeded by Oliver Seraphin |
