= Oliver Seraphin =

Dominican politician and former acting Prime Minister

Oliver James Seraphin

Prime Minister of Dominica
- In office June 25, 1979 – July 21, 1980
- President: Jenner Armour; Aurelius Marie
- Deputy: Michael Douglas
- Preceded by: Patrick John
- Succeeded by: Eugenia Charles

Personal details
- Born: August 2, 1943 (age 82) Roseau, Dominica
- Party: Democratic Labour Party of Dominica (1979–1983); Dominica Labour Party (before 1979 and after 1983)

Oliver James "O. J." Seraphin (or Seraphine; born August 2, 1943) is a former Dominican politician. He served as the Minister of communication and works and housing for the Labour Party government from 1975 to 1979 and acting Prime Minister of Dominica from 25 June 1979 until 21 July 1980.

== Early life ==
Seraphin grew up in Roseau, Dominica, the capital, and received primary and secondary education at Roseau Mixed School and Dominica Grammar School; later in life, he studied at the Carnegie Institute in the United States and in Cuba. Prior to politics, he worked in the insurance industry.

== Government Minister ==
He served in the socialist Dominica Labour Party government of Prime Minister Patrick John from 1975 to 1979. Seraphin originally held the posts of Minister of Communications, Works, and Housing, but in a cabinet reshuffle, the Prime Minister made him Minister of Agriculture, Lands, Fisheries and Caricom Affairs. During this time, the Commonwealth of Dominica gained its independence from the United Kingdom. When violent crowds opposed to the John government protested outside the House of Assembly, Seraphin resigned.

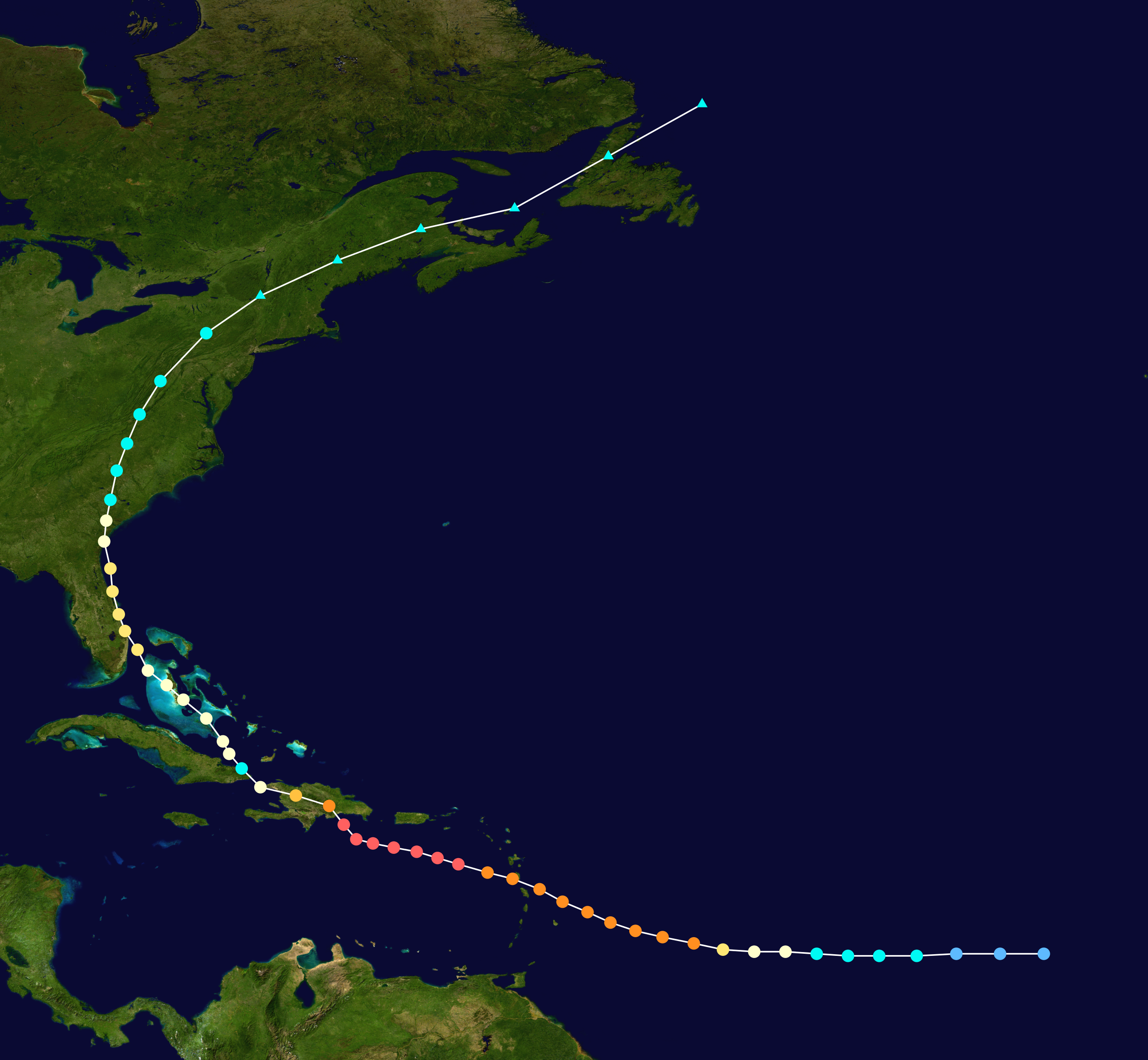
The path of Hurricane David. Dominica is obscured by an orange dot.

== Prime minister ==
Seraphin became prime minister on June 25, 1979, at the request of the Committee of National Salvation. In August 1979, Dominica was hit by Hurricane David, which killed over 76 people, and devastated much of the island. Seraphin was preoccupied with rescue and rebuilding efforts. He traveled to Barbados, Canada, France, the United States, and Venezuela to seek financial aid for rebuilding his country's infrastructure, in which he did. He was known to also help and rebuild homes for the homeless financing it all from his own personal account. He restored the island and helped create jobs. In his one plus year in office, he is said to have helped over half of the population of the island in the biggest hurricane Dominica has faced.

Seraphin formed Democratic Labour Party of Dominica (DLPD), and stood as its leader in the 1980 general election. However, he lost his seat, and Dominica Freedom Party led by Eugenia Charles won the election.

In 1983 Seraphin merged Dominica Democratic Labour Party back to Dominica Labour Party, and was elected as the leader of Dominica Labour Party with Patrick John as deputy leader. In 1985 he became the deputy party leader under Michael Douglas.

== Life after politics ==
Seraphin's government is commonly referred to as the "Interim Government." Since leaving politics, he has returned to business, especially that which is tourism-related, and maintains a public profile.

He is married to Lily Seraphin.

Preceded by Patrick John	Prime Minister of Dominica; 25 June 1979–21 July 1980	Succeeded by Eugenia Charles
