= 1957 Dominican general election =

Election in Dominica

General elections were held in Dominica on 15 August 1957. No political parties contested the elections and all candidates ran as independents. Voter turnout was 75.6%.

== Results ==
Party	Votes	%	Seats	+/–
Independents	16,626	100.00	8	0
Total	16,626	100.00	8	0
Valid votes	16,626	94.26		
Invalid/blank votes	1,013	5.74		
Total votes	17,639	100.00		
Registered voters/turnout	23,348	75.55		
Source: Nohlen
