= 1966 Dominican general election =

Election in Dominica

General elections were held in Dominica on 7 January 1966. The result was a victory for the Dominica Labour Party, which won 10 of the 11 seats. Voter turnout was 80.3%.

== Results ==
Party	Votes	%	Seats	+/–
Dominica Labour Party	11,735	64.77	10	+3
Dominica United People's Party	5,815	32.10	1	–3
Independents	568	3.14	0	0
Total	18,118	100.00	11	0
Valid votes	18,118	93.20		
Invalid/blank votes	1,322	6.80		
Total votes	19,440	100.00		
Registered voters/turnout	24,147	80.51		
Source: Caribbean Elections
