= Dominica Democratic Labour Party =

Dominican political party

The Dominica Democratic Labour Party was a political party in Dominica created by a split of the Dominica Labour Party in 1979. It was led by Oliver Seraphin. It contested the 1980 general elections, finishing second behind the Dominica Freedom Party with 19.7% of the vote and two of the 21 seats. The party merged with Dominica Labour Party in 1983. It did not contest any subsequent elections.
