= Dominica United People's Party =

Political party in Dominica

The Dominica United People's Party was a political party in Dominica. It first contested elections in 1961, when it finished second behind the Dominica Labour Party and won four of the eleven seats with 25.6% of the vote. In the 1966 elections it increased its share of the vote to 32.2%, but won only a single seat. It did not contest the next elections in 1970 then the Dominica Freedom Party became the main opposition party.
