= Soufrière, Dominica =

Soufrière
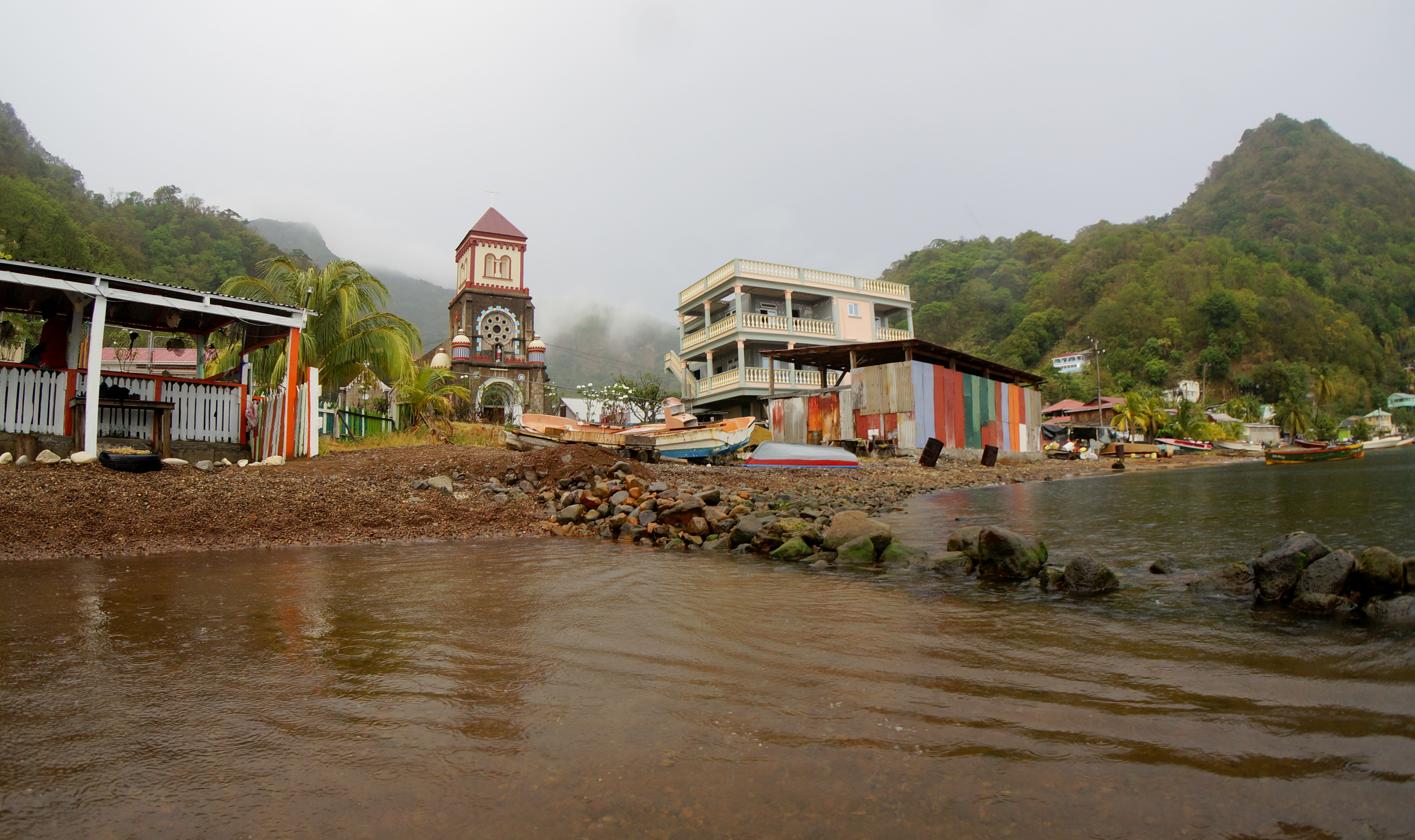
- Roman Catholic Church of St. Mark. Soufrière, Dominica.

- Location in Dominica
- Coordinates: 15°13′56″N 61°21′35″W
- Country: Dominica
- Parish: Saint Mark Parish
- Elevation: 48 m (157 ft)

Population (2011)
  - Total: 973
- Time zone: UTC-4 (UTC)

Soufrière is a village on the southwest coast of Dominica. It is the capital of Saint Mark Parish and has a population of 973 people.

== Gallery ==
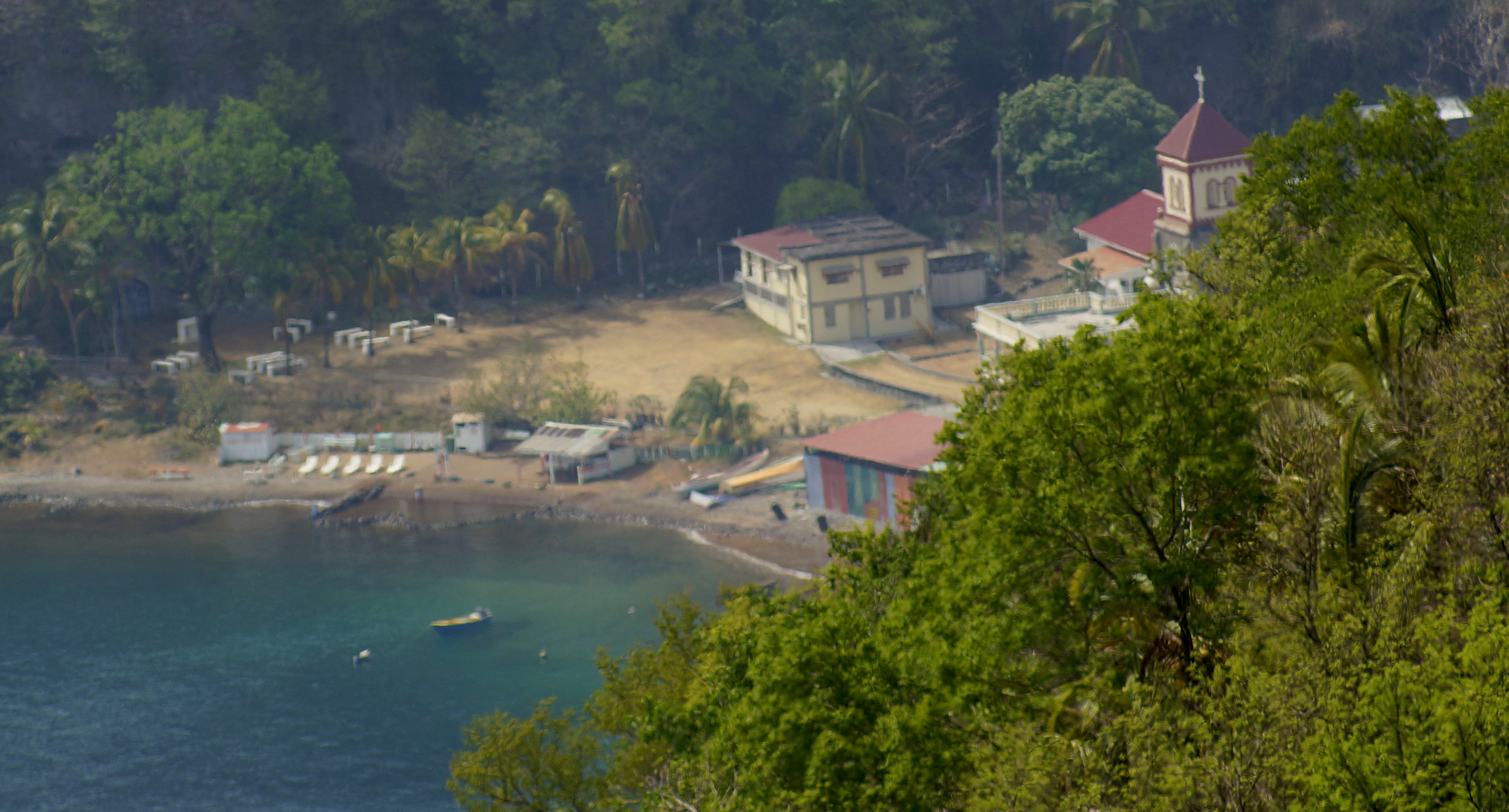
Aerial View of Soufrière

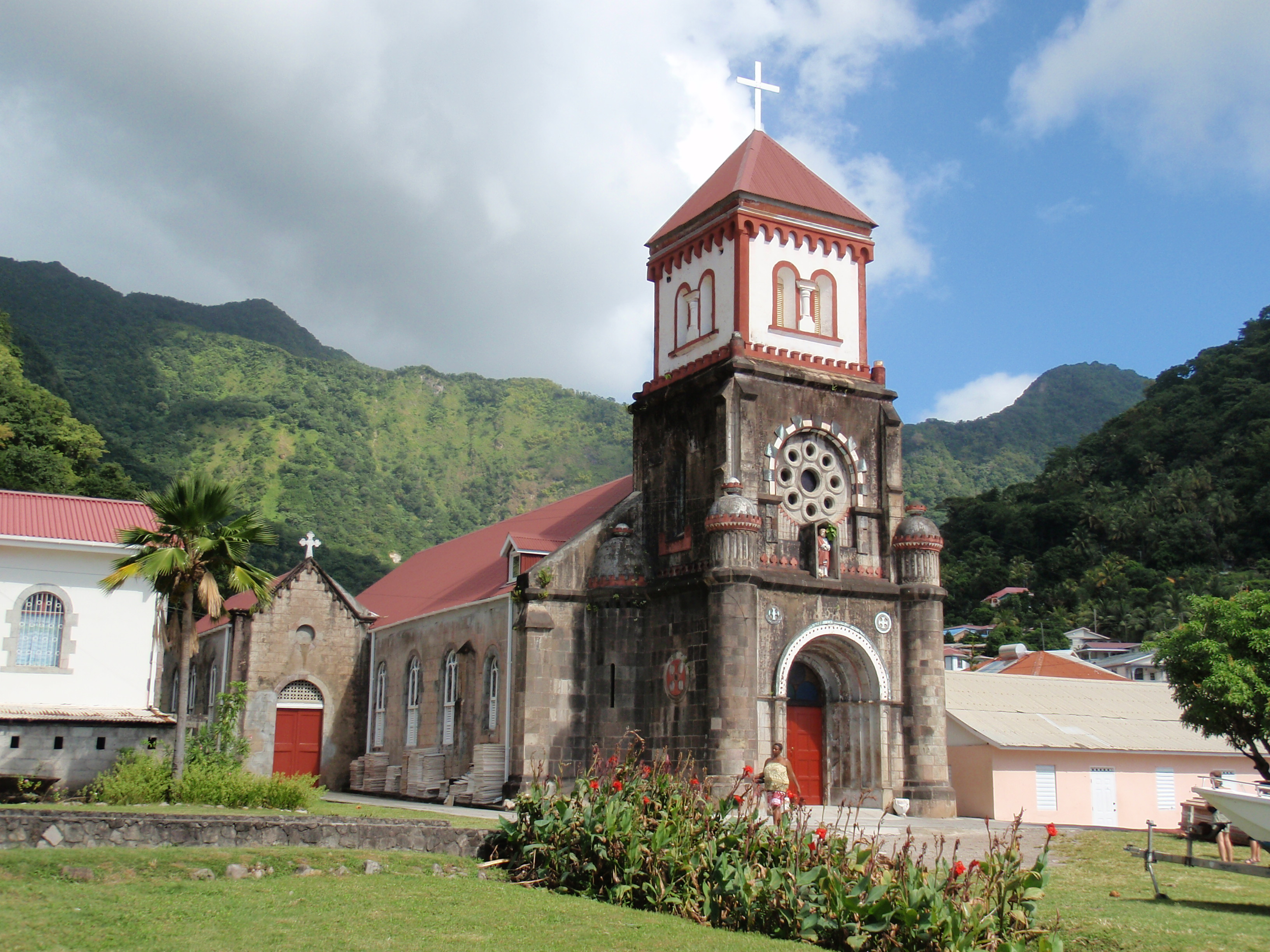
Soufriere Church

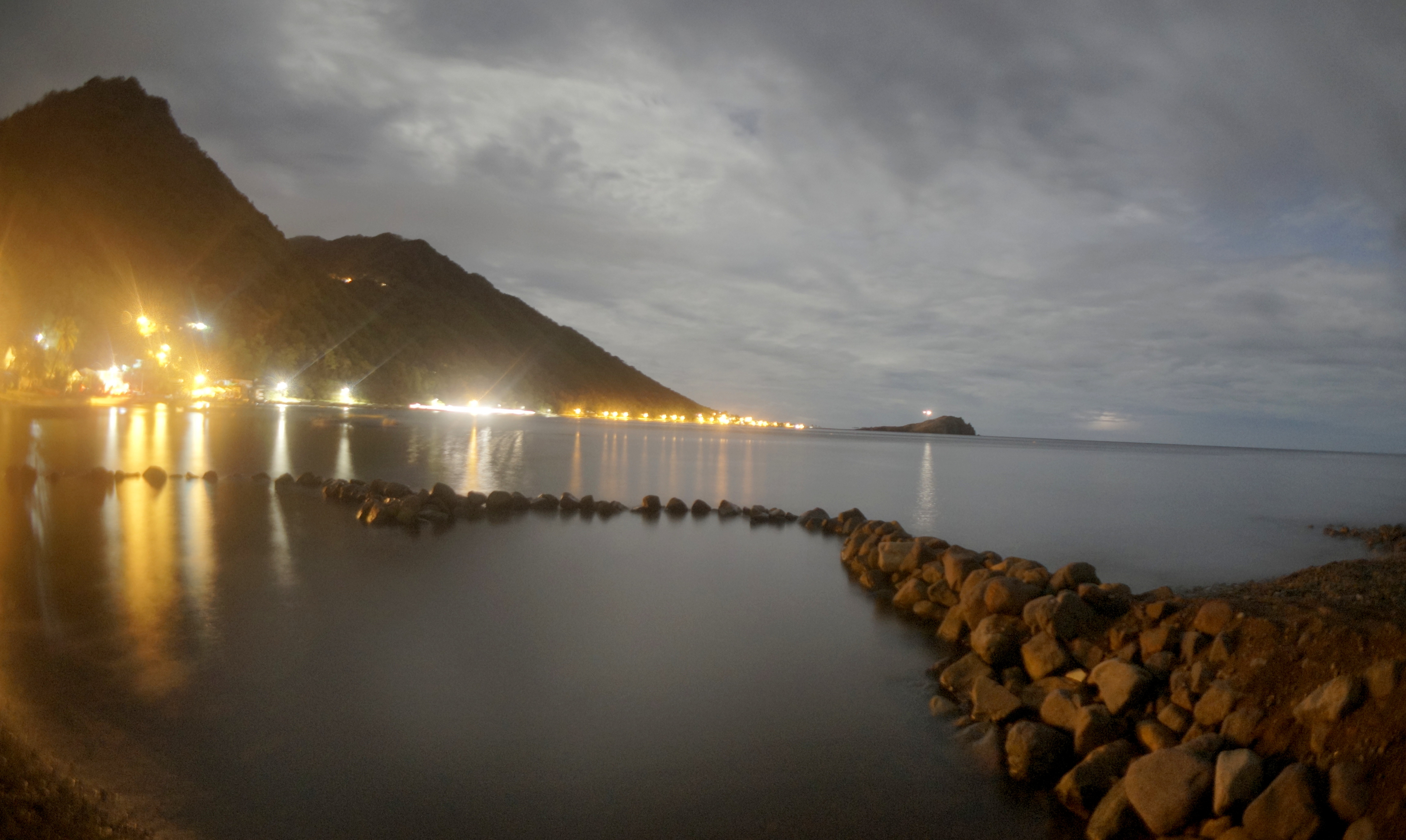
Soufrière Bay At Night
