= Eugenia Charles =

Prime Minister of Dominica from 1980 to 1995

Dame Eugenia Charles DBE
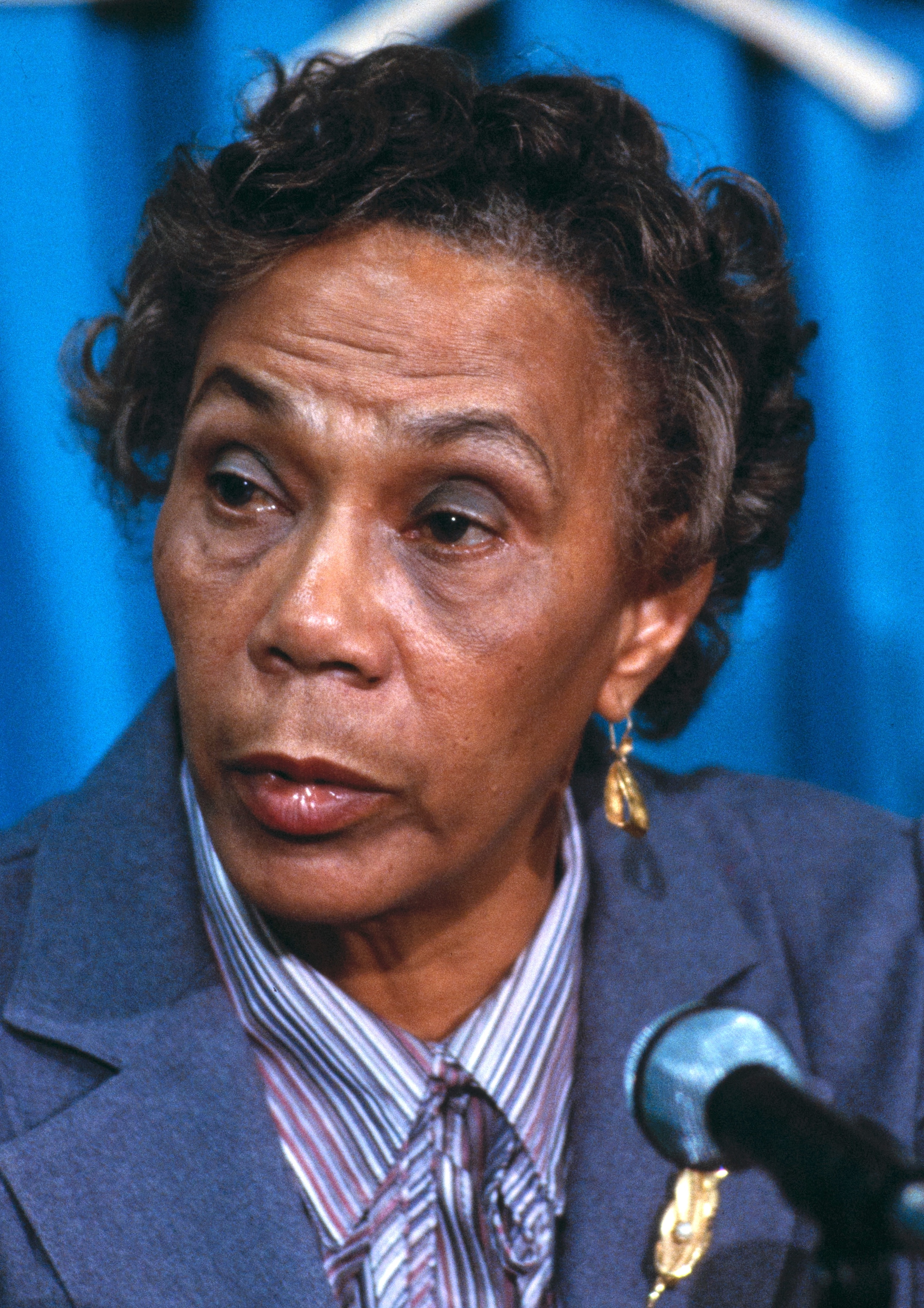
- Charles in 1985

2nd Prime Minister of Dominica
- In office 21 July 1980 – 14 June 1995
- President: Aurelius Marie; Clarence Seignoret; Crispin Sorhaindo
- Deputy: Anthony Moise; Charles Maynard
- Preceded by: Oliver Seraphin
- Succeeded by: Edison James

Member of Parliament for Roseau Central
- In office 24 March 1975 – 14 June 1995
- Succeeded by: Charles Savarin

Personal details
- Born: 15 May 1919 Pointe Michel, Dominica
- Died: 6 September 2005 (aged 86) Fort-de-France, Martinique
- Resting place: Pointe Michel, Dominica
- Party: Freedom Party
- Education: University of Toronto; London School of Economics
- Occupation: Politician; lawyer

Dame Mary Eugenia Charles (15 May 1919 – 6 September 2005) was a Dominican politician who served as the prime minister of Dominica from 21 July 1980 until 14 June 1995. She was the first woman lawyer in Dominica. After being nominated to a seat in the House of Assembly of Dominica and subsequently serving as leader of the opposition, she became Dominica's first, and to date only, woman prime minister.

She is best known for her actions during the leadup to the United States invasion of Grenada, when she appealed to the US for intervention. She was also known for her efforts to attract foreign aid and her initiation of the Dominica citizenship by investment programme. She was known as the "Iron Lady of the Caribbean" and nicknamed "Mamo Charles".

== Early life and career ==
Eugenia Charles was born on 15 May 1919, in the fishing village of Pointe Michel in Saint Luke Parish, Dominica. She was the daughter of John Baptiste Charles and Josephine Charles (née Delauney), and the youngest of four children. Her family was considered part of the "colored bourgoisie", descendants of free people of color who had become wealthy landowners. Her father was a mason who became a wealthy landowner and had business interests in export-import. He also served as Mayor of Roseau and as a Senator for Dominica.

On her first day of school, she refused to sit in her assigned seat, instead sitting next to her playmate; London School of Economics librarian Sonia Gomes posits that this is characteristic of her "lifelong determination". She attended the Convent High School in Roseau, which was then the island's only girls' secondary school, and St Joseph's Convent in Grenada. Afterward Charles became interested in law while attending the colonial magistrate's court. She worked for many years as assistant to then-colonial magistrate Alastair Forbes. Charles attended the University of Toronto in Canada, receiving her LL.B. in 1947. She then moved to the United Kingdom to attend the London School of Economics, where she earned her LL.M. in 1949. She was an honorary member of the sorority Sigma Gamma Rho. She trained as a barrister at the Inner Temple and was called to the bar in London in 1947.

She passed the bar and returned to Dominica, where she became the island's first female lawyer. She established a practice specializing in property law. She served as President of the Dominica Bar Association during the 1970s. She also worked as a director of the Dominican Cooperative Bank, which had been established by her father, and instituted the country's first student loan scheme. She never married nor had children.

== Political career ==
Charles began her political career in the 1960s, when she began campaigning against restrictions on press freedom. She wrote anonymous newspaper columns for The Herald and The Star criticising the Dominica Labour Party government. In 1967, she became involved in the Freedom Fighters, an advocacy group which opposed the Seditious and Undesirable Publications Act. In October 1968, the group merged with the National Democratic Movement of Dominica to become the Dominica Freedom Party (DFP). The party held its first convention in June 1969 and Charles was appointed as its leader, a position she would hold until 1995.

Charles contested the Roseau North seat in the 1970 general election but lost to Patrick John. However, the constitution allowed for one nominated member on the opposition side, and so she entered as a nominated member of the House of Assembly, where she sat from 1970 to 1975. She was elected to the House in the 1975 general election, representing the constituency of Roseau Central, and became the Leader of the Opposition. When the prime minister introduced a dress code act, she appeared at the House in a bathing suit in protest. Charles was a delegate at the 1977 constitutional conference at Marlborough House in London and actively supported Dominica gaining full independence from British rule in 1978. In 1979, she was a member of the Committee for National Salvation, which created an interim government after the resignation of Patrick John, where Oliver Seraphin took over. During this time, she used her power to expose government misspending.

=== Prime minister ===
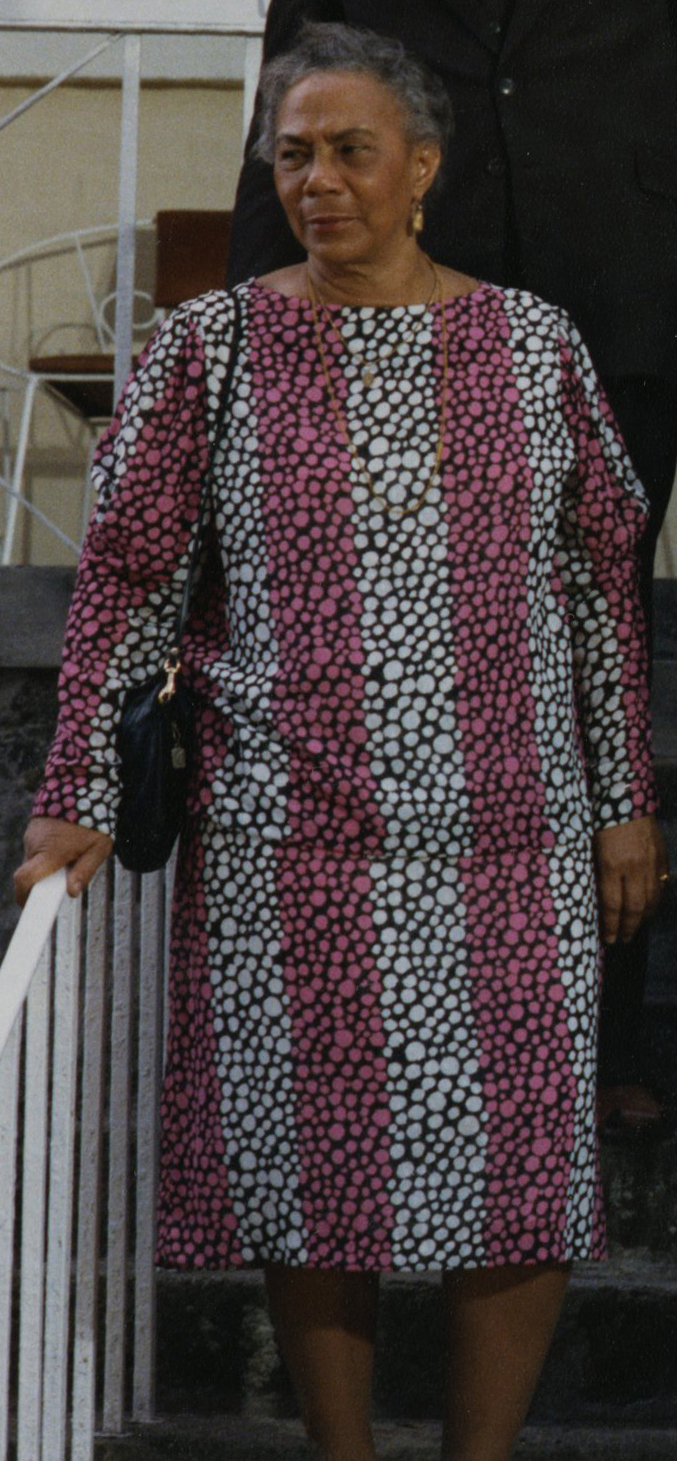
Charles in Grenada in 1986

Charles became prime minister when the DFP swept the 1980 general election, the party's first electoral victory. She took over from Oliver Seraphin. Her first term was focused on rebuilding infrastructure and disaster management as Hurricane David had hit Dominica on 29 August 1979. She additionally served as Dominica's Foreign Minister from 1980 to 1990, Minister of Finance from 1980 to 1995, and as chairperson of the Organisation of Eastern Caribbean States (OECS) in 1983.

In 1981, she faced two attempted coups d'état. In April 1981, a group of Canadian and American mercenaries, mostly affiliated with white supremacist and Ku Klux Klan groups, planned a coup, codenamed Operation Red Dog, to restore former Prime Minister Patrick John to power. The attempt was thwarted by American federal agents in New Orleans, Louisiana. That same year in November Frederick Newton, commander of the Military of Dominica, organized an attack on the police headquarters in Roseau, during which a police officer was killed. Newton and five other soldiers were found guilty in the attack and sentenced to death in 1983. The sentences of the five accomplices were later commuted to life in prison, but Newton was executed in 1986.

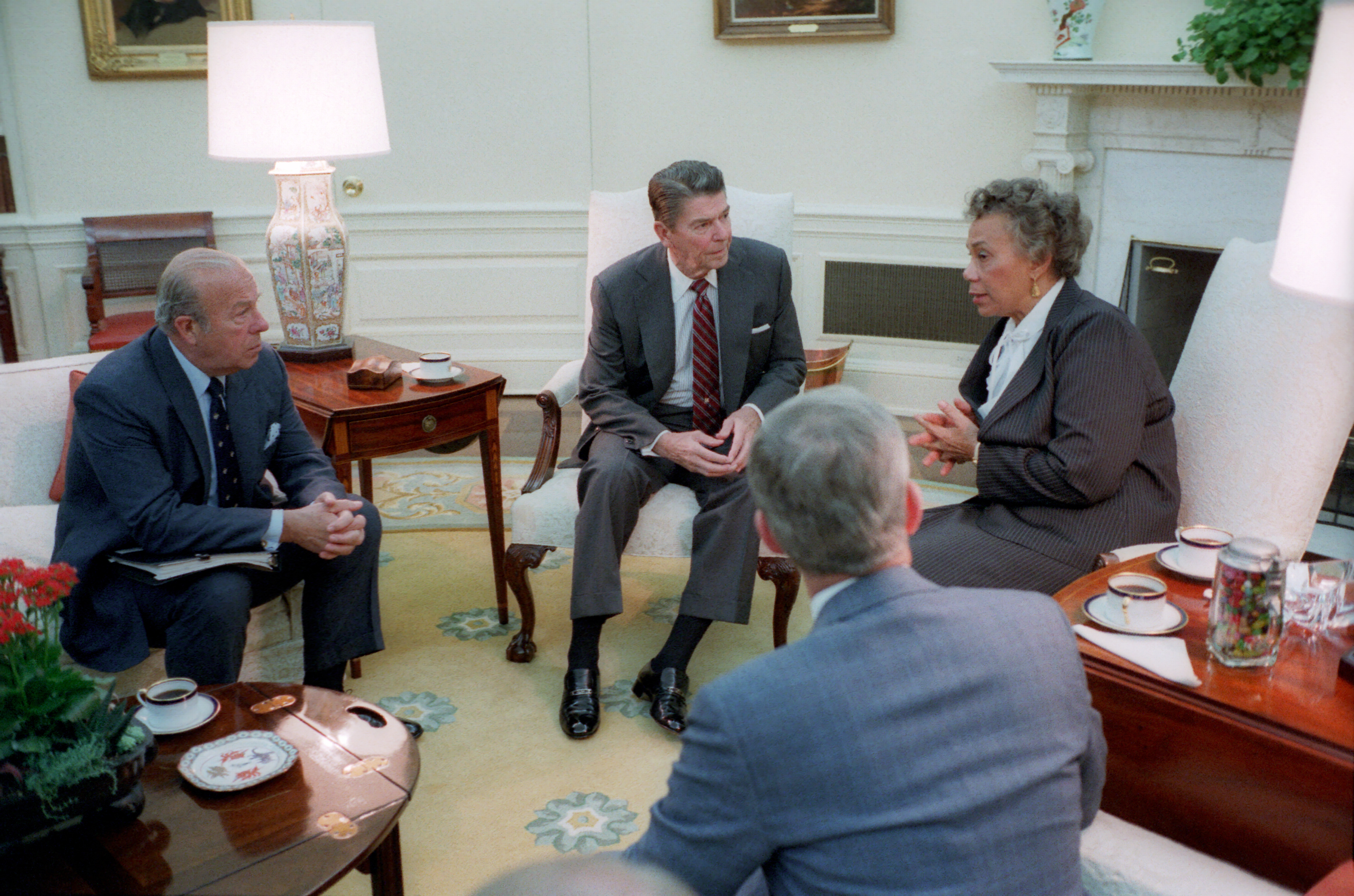
Charles meets with American President Ronald Reagan in the White House's Oval Office about ongoing events in Grenada

Charles became more widely known to the outside world for her role in the lead-up to the United States Invasion of Grenada on 25 October 1983. In the wake of the arrest and execution of Grenadian Prime Minister Maurice Bishop, Charles, then serving as chair of the OECS, appealed to the United States for intervention. She appeared on television with U.S. president Ronald Reagan, supporting the invasion and describing the OECS as "kith and kin" to support the idea that her appeal for help was "one region" asking for support and not an invasion. Journalist Bob Woodward reported that the U.S. paid millions of dollars to the Dominica government, some of which was regarded by the Central Intelligence Agency as a "payoff", for Charles's support of the intervention. Historians David Milne and Christopher Nichols attributed this decision to a broader plan by Charles to get the United States to pay more attention to the Caribbean. The intervention led to unrest, however, and was condemned 108-9 by the United Nations.

She was re-elected in the 1985 general election, during which time she also served as Minister of Defense, Minister of Foreign Affairs, Minister of Finance, and Minister of Economic Affairs. She was also re-elected in the 1990 general election. During her third term, however, her popularity declined, partially due to her control of the cabinet and partially due to her opinions on her successor. Some saw her as abrasive. She narrowly survived a no-confidence motion in 1991 by a vote of 11 to 10. In 1994, she declared a state of emergency in Dominica due to unrest after her government raised motor vehicle license fees.

Charles and her party have been considered conservatives. However, The Independent argues that this conservatism was merely "nominal", due to her work on anti-corruption laws, economic reform, and equal rights for women, which she began immediately after her election. For her uncompromising stance on these and other issues, she became known as the "Iron Lady of the Caribbean" (after the original "Iron Lady", Margaret Thatcher). She was also known as "Mamo Charles".

She initiated the Dominica citizenship by investment programme in 1991, during her third term as Prime Minister. It was the second-oldest citizenship by investment program in the Caribbean, after Saint Kitts and Nevis. That same year, she was made a Dame Commander of the Order of the British Empire (DBE). Her citizenship by investment programme, as of 2024, made up 37% of the economy of Dominica.

She was seen as a strong advocate for the island's banana industry. In 1992, she advocated for quotas for African, Caribbean, and Pacific bananas to counter the strength of Latin bananas. She once stated, however, that bananas and politics do not mix. She also became known for her efforts to attract foreign aid, which resulted in new schools, hospitals, power lines, roads, and airports, as well as a strengthened tourist industry. She balanced her reforms with preserving the island's ecology and identity.

== Later years and death ==
Charles retired in 1995. The DFP subsequently lost the 1995 general election and eventually collapsed. After retiring, Charles undertook speaking engagements in the United States and abroad. She became involved in former U.S. President Jimmy Carter's Carter Center, which promotes human rights and observes elections to encourage fairness. She was awarded the Order of the Caribbean Community by CARICOM in 2003.

On 30 August 2005, Charles entered a hospital in Fort-de-France, Martinique, for hip-replacement surgery. She died from a pulmonary embolism on 6 September, at the age of 86. She was buried in her home village of Pointe Michel on 14 September.

== Legacy ==
Her centenary in 2019 was honored with a retrospective by the London School of Economics. Her papers are also being integrated into the Nita Barrow Women and Development Specialist Collection at the University of the West Indies, together with those of Nita Barrow. Historians Eudine Barriteau and Alan Gregor Cobley have argued her public image as a "commanding, charismatic" figure has overshadowed assessments of her accomplishments.

She was the first woman prime minister in the Caribbean and the first woman in the Americas to be elected in her own right as head of government. She served for the second longest period of any Dominican prime minister.

== See also ==
- First women lawyers around the world

Political offices
Preceded by Oliver Seraphin	Prime Minister of Dominica; 1980–1995	Succeeded by Edison James
Preceded by Anthony Moise	Leader of the Opposition (Dominica); 1975–1980	Succeeded by Matthew Joseph
