= 1961 Dominican general election =

Election in Dominica

General elections were held in Dominica on 17 January 1961. The result was a victory for the Dominica Labour Party, which won 7 of the 11 seats. Voter turnout was 76.9%.

== Results ==
Party	Votes	%	Seats	+/–
Dominica Labour Party	7,848	47.38	7	New
Dominica United People's Party	4,233	25.55	4	New
All Island Industrial and Farmers Party	1,333	8.05	0	New
Peasant and Workers Movement	487	2.94	0	New
Dominica Democratic Party	125	0.75	0	New
Independents	2,539	15.33	0	–8
Total	16,565	100.00	11	+3
Valid votes	16,565	94.01		
Invalid/blank votes	1,056	5.99		
Total votes	17,621	100.00		
Registered voters/turnout	22,838	77.16		
Source: Caribbean Elections
