= Prime Minister of Dominica =

Head of government

Prime Minister of the Commonwealth of Dominica
- Coat of arms of Dominica

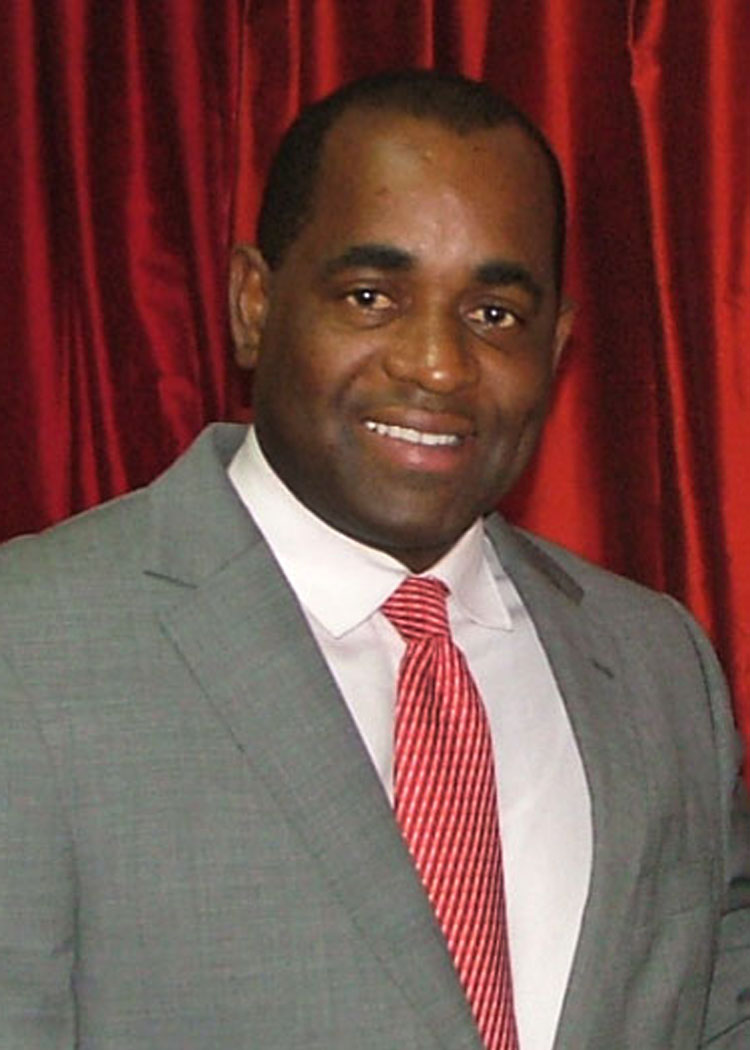
- Incumbent; Roosevelt Skerrit since 8 January 2004
- Residence: Financial Centre, Kennedy Avenue, Roseau
- Inaugural holder: Patrick John
- Formation: 3 November 1978
- Deputy: Deputy Prime Minister of Dominica
- Salary: EC$58,498 / US$21,666 annually
- Website: www.dominica.gov.dm

The prime minister of Dominica is the head of government in the Commonwealth of Dominica. Nominally, the position was created on November 3, 1978, when Dominica gained independence from the United Kingdom. Hitherto, the position existed de facto as Premier. Roosevelt Skerrit is the incumbent prime minister. He took office on 8 January 2004.

== Authority and duties ==
According to Chapter 59 of the Constitution of the Commonwealth of Dominica;

1. There shall be a Prime Minister of Dominica, who shall be appointed by the President.
2. Whenever the President has occasion to appoint a Prime Minister he shall appoint an elected member of the House who appears to him likely to command the support of the majority of the elected members of the House.

The President, acting in accordance with the advice of the Prime Minister, appoints the Cabinet of Minister. The Prime Minister supervises Cabinet meetings and in the spirit of the Westminster system is nominally 'Primus Inter Pares' or first among equals. However Prime Ministers of Dominica, like most Prime Ministers in Small-Island States, have generally governed in a presidential manner.

== See also ==
- List of presidents of Dominica
- Deputy Prime Minister of Dominica
- Politics of Dominica
- List of heads of government of Dominica
- List of Commonwealth heads of government
- List of Privy Counsellors (1952–2022)
