= Mahaut (Dominica constituency) =

- Constituency for the House of Assembly of Dominica
- Electorate: 7060 (2016)
- Major settlements: Canefield, Campbell, Massacre, Mahaut, Jimmit, Tarreau, Roger, Springfield, Warner

Current constituency
- Created: 1975
- Number of members: 1
- Representative: Cassanni Laville (DLP)

Mahaut is a parliamentary electoral district in Dominica. It came into effect in time for the 1975 Dominican general election. It has been represented by Cassanni Laville of the Dominica Labor Party since the 2022 general election.

== Constituency profile ==
There was an electorate of 7060 as of November 2016. It includes the areas of Canefield, Campbell, Massacre, and Mahaut.
