= Financial Service Unit of the Commonwealth of Dominica =

Financial supervisory authority

Financial Service Unit
Agency overview
- Formed: 2008
- Type: Regulates: Offshore banks, Credit unions, Insurance companies, Money services businesses, Financial entities
- Jurisdiction: Caribbean
- Headquarters: Caribbean
- Agency executive: Claudius Lestrade, Director
- Parent agency: Ministry of Finance
- Website: fsu.gov.dm

The Financial Service Unit of the Commonwealth of Dominica or (FSU) is the main financial supervisory authority in the Island of Dominica, it is one of the most stringent financial authorities in the Caribbean and is a major participant in the offshore regulatory framework. Dependent on the Ministry of Finance the Financial Service Unit regulates all Offshore Banks, Credit Unions, Insurance Companies, Money Service Businesses, Gaming Companies and Other Financial Entities.

The authority of the Financial Services Unit (FSU), which is a department within the Ministry of Finance, covers the financial sector in Dominica. The FSU supervises and regulates all the financial sector within the island with the exception of Commercial Banks and Securities Business

== History of the FSU ==
With the creation of the Financial Services Unit in 2008, supervision of the non-Commercial bank financial sector; to include Offshore Banking, Money Services Businesses, Insurances, Credit Unions etc. was significantly strengthened, an essential element in ensuring the safety and soundness of this sector. The FSU has developed an effective supervisory regime, where customer's confidence will increase accordingly to the benefit of all concerned.

In 2011, the FSU under section 7 of the Money Laundering Prevention Act. No. 8 became the Money Laundering Supervisory Authority The Financial Services Unit aims to ensure that every financial institution conducts a risk assessment, whereby policies, procedures and controls can be developed as to prevent/ mitigate the ML/TF risks identified.

The government of the Commonwealth of Dominica stated that confidence and stability in the financial sector is critical for the development of the overall economy. This is of even greater importance in today's turbulent economic times and the role of the Financial Services Unit therefore becomes even more significant. The Dominica Offshore Services Sector continues to grow in the jurisdiction and while Dominica is welcoming to this type of business, quality and not quantity remains the main denominator in this Jurisdiction.

== Mandate of the FSU ==
The mandate of the FSU stems from the FSU Act which gives it responsibility to monitor financial institutions operating in Dominica, take action against persons carrying on unlicensed financial services business, supervise licensees in accordance with the FSU Act and the financial services enactments, and administer the financial services enactments or any other relevant enactments.

== Functions of the FSU ==
Under Section 5 of the FSU Act (PDF 83.14KB), the Director of the Unit is responsible for the administration of that Act.

Legal Powers, Duties and Functions Section 3 of the Act establishes the Financial Services Unit. Section 5 of the Act states that the Director of the Unit shall be responsible for the general administration of the Act. The principal functions of the Director are specified in section 9 of the Act as follows:-

- Supervise licensees in accordance with this Act, the financial services enactments and regulatory Codes;
- Monitor, through onsite examinations, the compliance of regulated persons with the Money Laundering (Prevention) Act 2011 (PDF 93.87KB), the Suppression of the Financing of Terrorism Act 2003 (PDF 74.42KB) and any other Act, regulation, Code or Guidelines relating to the Money Laundering (Prevention) Act 2011 or the Suppression of the Financing of Terrorism Act 2003;
- Monitor financial institutions operating in or from Dominica and take action against persons carrying on unlicensed financial services business;
- Administer the financial services enactments or any other relevant enactments;
- Maintain and supervise the offshore registry;
- Monitor the effectiveness of the financial services enactments in providing for the regulation of financial services business in Dominica to internationally accepted standards;
- Advise the Minister on matters relating to financial services business;
- Make recommendations to the Minister on amendments or revisions necessary to be made to the financial services enactments or for the enactment of new legislation to regulate financial services;
- Encourage high professional standards within the financial services industry;
- Maintain contacts and forge relations with foreign regulatory authorities, international associations of regulatory authorities and other international associations or groups relevant to its functions and to provide regulatory assistance to foreign regulatory authorities in accordance with this Act;
- Provide such information and advice to licensees and the public or any section of the public concerning financial services as he considers appropriate;
- Discharge such other functions as may be assigned to him under this Act;
- Take such other measures as he considers appropriate to develop the financial services industry in Dominica;
- Liaise with the Financial Intelligence Unit;
- Liaise with the Central Bank with respect to supervising the functioning of the financial services business sector in Dominica;
- Make a Regulatory Code with the approval of the Minister;
- Inspect financial institutions to ensure that they comply with any Regulatory Code issued by the Central bank or the Minister;
- Develop and assist in the development of anti-money laundering and counter terrorism financing strategies for Dominica;
- Advise the Minister with regard to any matter relating to money laundering or terrorist financing.

== Regulated offshore banks by the FSU ==
- Asprofin Bank
- Cathedral Investment Bank
- Arton Bank Corporation
- Barnett Capital Bank
- Commonwealth Bank
- BBP Bandenia Private Bank Inc
- IBank Corporation
- Zuma Bank Corporation
- Interoceanic Bank of the Caribbean Inc
- Paxum Bank Limited
- Standard Commerce Bank
- AXIA Capital Bank Ltd.

== See also ==
- Commonwealth of Dominica
- Ministry of Finance
- Dominica
- Economy of Dominica
- List of financial supervisory authorities by country
