= Campbell, Dominica =

Village in Dominica

Coordinates: 15°22′30″N 61°22′20″W

Campbell Village is a small village in Dominica. It is located in the parish of Saint. Paul, near Mahaut Village and is notable for its hidden waterfalls.

== Notes ==
2. Dominica Population and Housing Census 2001
