= Grand Fond, Dominica =

Village in Dominica

Coordinates: 15°21′41″N 61°16′29″W

Grand Fond is a village in Saint David Parish, Dominica.

== History ==
Grand Fond Primary School was founded in 1952.

== See also ==
- List of towns and villages in Dominica
