= Economy of Dominica =

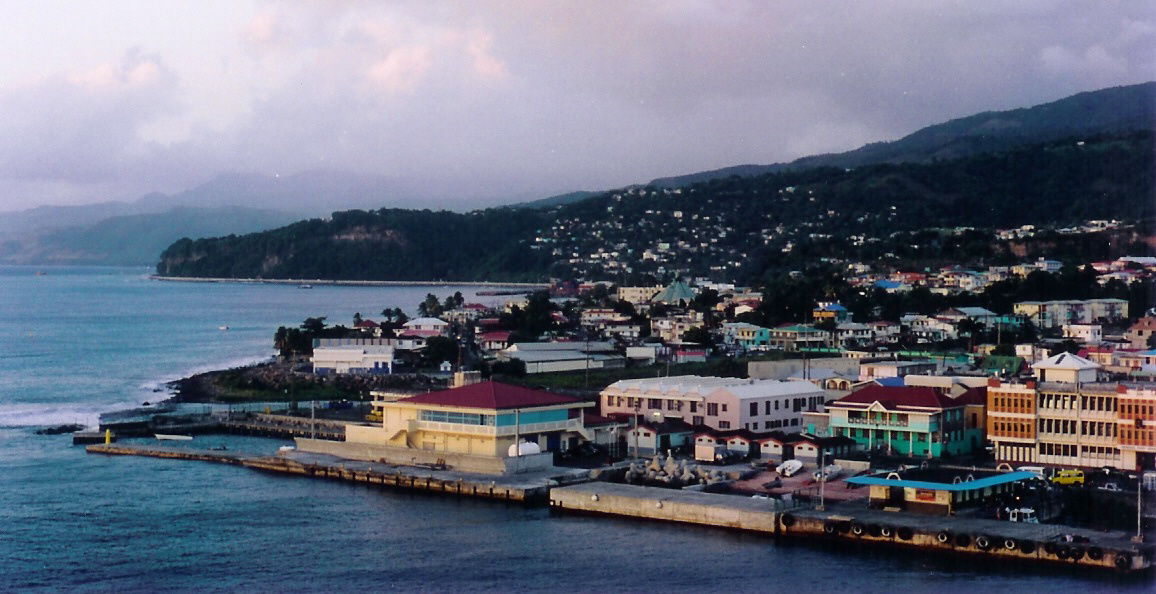
- Currency: East Caribbean Dollar
- Fiscal year: 1 July - 30 June
- Trade organisations: WTO, CARICOM

Statistics
- GDP: ▲$0.74 billion (nominal; 2025); ▲$1.47 billion (PPP; 2025)
- GDP rank: 187th (nominal; 2025); 188th (PPP; 2025)
- GDP growth: ▲4.7% (2023); ▲4.6% (2024); ▲4.2% (2025); ▲3.3% (2026f)
- GDP per capita: ▲$9,870 (nominal; 2025); ▲$19,580 (PPP; 2025)
- GDP per capita rank: 82nd (nominal; 2025); 95th (PPP; 2025)
- GDP by sector: agriculture (15.7%), industry (15.6%), services (68.7%) (2013)
- Inflation (CPI): 1.359% (2018)
- Population below national poverty line: 29% (2009)
- Labour force: 25,000 (2000)
- Labour force by occupation: agriculture 40%, industry 32%, services 28% (2002)
- Unemployment: 23% (2000)
- Main industries: soap, coconut oil, tourism, copra, furniture, cement blocks, shoes

External
- Exports: $160 million (2018 est.)
- Export goods: medical instruments, pharmaceuticals, low-voltage protection equipment, tropical fruits, bandages
- Main export partners: Bahamas 12.3%; South Korea 12.2%; Saudi Arabia 9.75%; Italy 8.12% (2024)
- Imports: $430 million (2018 est.)
- Import goods: refined petroleum, natural gas, crude petroleum, recreational boats, cars
- Main import partners: United States 18.9%; China 15.3%; Italy 11.4%; Trinidad and Tobago 9.74%; Guyana 6.93%; Taiwan 6.45% (2024)
- Gross external debt: 274.9 million (2013)

Public finance
- Foreign reserves: $90 million (31 December 2013 est.)
- Revenue: $148.1 million (2013)
- Spending: $185.2 million (2013)
- All values, unless otherwise stated, are in US dollars.

The economy of Dominica is reliant upon agriculture, particularly bananas, with the financial services industry and citizenship by investment scheme becoming increasingly the island's largest source of income. Banana production employs, directly or indirectly, upwards of one-third of the work force. This sector is highly vulnerable to weather conditions and to external events affecting commodity prices. The value of banana exports fell to less than 25% of merchandise trade earnings in 1998 compared to about 44% in 1994.

In view of the European Union's announced phase-out of preferred access of bananas to its markets, agricultural diversification is a priority. Dominica has made some progress, with the export of small quantities of citrus fruits and vegetables and the introduction of coffee, patchouli, aloe vera, cut flowers, and exotic fruits such as mangoes, guavas, and papayas. Dominica has also had some success in increasing its manufactured exports, with soap as the primary product. Dominica also recently entered the offshore financial services market.

Because Dominica is mostly volcanic and has few beaches, development of tourism has been slow compared with that on neighboring islands. Nevertheless, Dominica's high, rugged mountains, rainforests, freshwater lakes, hot springs, waterfalls, and diving spots make it an attractive destination. Cruise ship stopovers have increased following the development of modern docking and waterfront facilities in the capital. Eco-tourism also is a growing industry on the island.

Dominica is a member of the Eastern Caribbean Currency Union (ECCU). The Eastern Caribbean Central Bank (ECCB) issues a common currency (the East Caribbean dollar) to all eight members of the ECCU. The ECCB also manages monetary policy, and regulates and supervises commercial banking activities in its member countries. Dominica is a beneficiary of the U.S. Caribbean Basin Initiative (CBI). Its 1996 exports to the U.S. were $7.7 million, and its U.S. imports were $34 million. Dominica is also a member of the 15-member Caribbean Community (CARICOM) and of the Organisation of Eastern Caribbean States (OECS).

== Primary industries ==
=== Agriculture ===
About 22.6% of the total land area is arable. Agricultural production was on the decline even before the 1979 hurricane disaster. The main crop of Dominica is bananas, the output of which had fallen to 29,700 tons in 1978. As a result of Hurricane David, production hit a low of 15,700 tons in 1979. Agriculture suffered a further blow from Hurricane Allen in August 1980. However, after outside financial support began to rehabilitate the sector, production rose to 27,800 tons in 1981 and totaled 30,000 tons in 1999. Additionally, there are other products like citrus, coconuts, cocoa, herbal oils and extracts.

Agriculture accounts for about 20% of GDP and employs about 40% of the labor force. Agricultural exports amounted to $19.1 million in 2001. Most crops are produced on small farms, the 9,000 owners of which are banded together in about 10 cooperatives; there are also several large farms that produce mostly bananas for export. Other major crops are coconuts and citrus fruits which are grown in commercial quantities. Production for 1999 included coconuts, 11,000 tons; grapefruit, 21,000 tons; lemons and limes, 1,000 tons; and oranges, 8,000 tons. Fruits and vegetables are produced mostly for local consumption.

=== Animal husbandry ===
There are about 2,000 hectares (4,900 acres) of pasture land, comprising 2.7% of the total land area. The island does not produce sufficient meat, poultry, or eggs for local consumption so there are large imports of animal products. In 2001 there were an estimated 540 head of cattle, 9,700 goats, 7,600 sheep, and 5,000 hogs. In 2001, production of meat totaled 1,300 tons; and milk, 6,100 tons.

=== Fishing ===
Before Hurricane David, some 2,000 persons earned a living fishing in coastal waters, producing about 1,000 tons of fish a year and meeting only about one-third of the local demand. The hurricane destroyed almost all of the island's 470 fishing boats; afterward, only about a dozen vessels could be reconstructed for use. In 2000, the catch was 1,150 tons, up from 552 tons in 1991.

There is a relatively large fishing industry in Dominica, but it is not modernized and almost exclusively serves the domestic market. A successful experiment in fresh-water prawn farming, supported by Taiwanese aid, has produced substantial amounts of prawns for the domestic and local markets. Japan has provided support for a fish landing and processing plant in Roseau.

=== Forestry ===
Dominica has the potential for a lumber industry. Some 46,000 hectares (110,000 acres) are classified as forest, representing 61% of the total land area. In 1962, Canadian experts produced a study indicating that over a 40-year period the island could produce a yearly output of 22,000 cu m (800,000 cu ft) of lumber. Before Hurricane David, annual output had reached about 7,500 cu m (265,000 cu ft). There are some 280 hectares (690 acres) of government land allocated to commercial forestry and about 100 hectares (250 acres) of forestland in private hands. Commercially valuable woods include mahogany, blue and red mahoe, and teak. Total imports of forest products in 2000 amounted to $10.3 million.

=== Mining ===
Dominica's mining sector played a minor role in its economy. Pumice was the major commodity extracted from the island for export, and Dominica produced clay, limestone, volcanic ash, and sand and gravel, primarily for the construction industry. There is some mining potential in Dominica, especially in the island's northeast where there are believed to be deposits of copper.

== Secondary industries ==
Dominica's small manufacturing sector is almost entirely dependent on agriculture, and the island has built up a handful of successful industries specializing in soaps and other agricultural byproducts. The largest manufacturer is Dominica Coconut Products, controlled by Colgate-Palmolive, which produces soap from coconuts. The factory has an agreement to sell an estimated 3 million bars of soap each year to Royal Caribbean Cruise Lines. Dominican soap is also exported throughout the region, but has recently encountered intensified competition from other regional producers, especially in the important export markets of Jamaica and Trinidad and Tobago.

There are four plants to process limes and other citrus fruits; two bottling plants; two distilleries; four small apparel plants; and four small furniture factories. Dominica exports water to its Caribbean neighbors; shoes, cement blocks, furniture, and soap and toiletries are also exported. Home industries produce some leather work, ceramics, and straw products.

Since the 1990s, the small manufacturing sector has been expanding at a modest pace, including electronic assembly, rum, candles, and paints. The Trafalgar Hydro Electric Power Station is now operational, making the island virtually energy self-sufficient. Industry accounted for 23% of GDP in 2001.

Dominica has not yet been able to attract significant numbers of foreign manufacturers, partly because its wage rates are relatively high and partly because its infrastructure is not suited to high-volume manufacturing. Like other islands, it seeks to attract investors with tax concessions and other financial inducements, but several offshore manufacturing plants have closed after their duty-free concessions expired, normally a 10-year span.

== Tertiary industries ==
=== Tourism ===
Tourism in Dominica is mostly centered around Eco Tourism. It consists of hiking, bird watching, canyoning, kayaking etc. Being the Nature Isle of the Caribbean, it stands true to its name as there are numerous outdoor activities based in nature. With the impact of COVID-19, the island has halted its Carnival and Independence Celebrations since mid 2020, which are two of its largest financial contributors in the tourism sector.

=== Financial services ===
The Commonwealth of Dominica has become in recent years a major international financial hub, and is quickly becoming one of the largest banking centres in the world, and offshore services are also becoming its main source of income. There are a number of service providers. These include global financial institutions including Scotiabank, Royal Bank of Canada, First Caribbean International Bank;

The largest Financial sectors are "offshore banking, payment processing companies, and general corporate activities". Regulation and supervision of the financial services industry is the responsibility of the Financial Service Unit of the Commonwealth of Dominica (FSU) under the supervision of the Ministry of Finance.

Starting in the mid-late 1990s, offshore financial centres, such as the Commonwealth of Dominica, came under increasing pressure from the OECD for their allegedly harmful tax regimes, where the OECD wished to prevent low-tax regimes from having an advantage in the global marketplace. The OECD threatened to place the Commonwealth of Dominica and other financial centres on a "black list" and impose sanctions against them. However, the Commonwealth of Dominica successfully avoided being placed on the OECD blacklist by committing to regulatory reform to improve transparency and begin information exchange with OECD member countries about their citizens.

Dominica has tried to expand its base by building up offshore financial services. So far, a relatively small number of offshore banks and other international business companies have registered in Dominica, but the government is trying to attract more by making registration economical and easy. A Dominica-based International Business Company (IBC) can, for instance, be formed over the Internet, and the government has also granted operating licenses to several Internet gambling companies.

== Statistics ==
Exports of Dominica by product category (2019) Chemical products Transportation Machines Mineral products Plastics and rubbers Metals Foodstuffs Precious metals Textiles Instruments Animal products Vegetable products Paper goods Footwear and headwear Miscellaneous Stone and glass Wood products Animal and vegetable bi-products Animal hides Arts and antiques Weapons

GDP: purchasing power parity - $485 million (2006 est.)

GDP - real growth rate: 3.2% (2007 est.)

GDP - per capita: purchasing power parity - $3,800 (2005 est.)

GDP - composition by sector:
agriculture: 17.7%
industry: 32.8%
services: 49.5% (2004 est.)

Population below poverty line: 29% (2009 est.)

Household income or consumption by percentage share:
lowest 10%: NA%
highest 10%: NA%

Inflation rate (consumer prices): -0.1% (2005 est.)

Labor force: 25,000 (2000 est.)

Labor force - by occupation:
agriculture: 40%
industry: 32%
services: 28% (2006 est.)

Unemployment rate: 23% (2003 est.)

Budget:
revenues: $73.9 million
expenditures: $84.4 million (2001)

Industries: soap, coconut oil, tourism, copra, furniture, cement blocks, shoes

Industrial production growth rate: -10% (1997 est.)

Electricity - production: 80 million kWh (2005)

Electricity - production by source:
fossil fuel: 50%
hydro: 50%
nuclear: 0%
other: 0% (1998)

Electricity - consumption: 74.4 million kWh (2005)

Electricity - exports: 0 kWh (2005)

Electricity - imports: 0 kWh (2005)

Agriculture - products: bananas, citrus, mangoes, root crops, coconuts, cocoa; forest and fishery potential not exploited

Exports: $94 million f.o.b. (2006)

Exports - commodities: bananas 50%, soap, bay oil, vegetables, grapefruit, oranges

Exports - partners: United Kingdom 24.8%, Jamaica 12.3%, Antigua and Barbuda 9.8%, Guyana 8.3%, China 7.9%, Trinidad and Tobago 5.4%, Saint Lucia 4.5% (2006)

Imports: $296 million f.o.b. (2006)

Imports - commodities: manufactured goods, machinery and equipment, food, chemicals

Imports - partners: United States 25.3%, China 22.7%, Trinidad and Tobago 13.8%, South Korea 4.8% (2006)

Debt - external: $213 million (2004)

Economic aid - recipient: $15.17 million (2005 est.)

Currency: 1 East Caribbean dollar (EC$) = 100 cents

Exchange rates: East Caribbean dollars per US dollar - 2.7 (2007), 2.7 (2006), 2.7 (2005), 2.7 (2004), 2.7 (2003)

Fiscal year: 1 July - 30 June

== See also ==
- List of medical schools in the Caribbean
