= Benjamin Aislabie =

Slave plantation owner and cricket administrator (1774–1842)

- Mezzotint of Aislabie painted by Henry Dawe in 1838

Personal information
- Full name: Benjamin Aislabie
- Born: 14 January 1774; Newington Green, London
- Died: 2 June 1842 (aged 68); Regent's Park, London
- Batting: Right-handed
- Role: Batsman

Domestic team information
- Years: Team
- 1808–1841: Marylebone Cricket Club (MCC)
- 1808–1817: Surrey
- 1819: Hampshire
- 1823: Kent
- 1827: Sussex

Benjamin Aislabie (14 January 1774 – 2 June 1842) was an English wine merchant, slave plantation owner and cricket administrator. He was the first Honorary Secretary of Marylebone Cricket Club (MCC) and was influential in its early development. He also played between 1808 and 1841 as an amateur but was, statistically, one of the worst players on record.

== Early life ==
Aislabie was descended from John Aislabie who had been Chancellor of the Exchequer during the South Sea Bubble. Aislabie's father, Rawson Aislabie, was a London soap and wine merchant who lived at Stoke Newington and owned plantations in Dominica in the British West Indies; he died around 1806 leaving a will worth £60,000.

Aislabie was born at Newington Green in London in 1774, the youngest child of Rawson and Frances Aislabie. He was educated at Sevenoaks School and possibly at Eton College. (Note: There is some doubt whether Aislabie attended Eton or not. His name, according to Etoniana in 1935, does not appear on the school roll although it is possible he was omitted, attended under a different name or was only at the school for a short period.) It is not known if he played at school, and he is first known to have played the sport for Homerton Cricket Club in 1795.

== Cricket ==
Aislabie joined the Marylebone Cricket Club (MCC) in 1802 and played for the club between 1808 and 1841. He was President of MCC in 1823 and was the first Honorary Secretary of the club, a role he fulfilled between 1822 and his death. He was a poor administrator with the club "lurching from crisis to crisis" during his time as Secretary, although he attempted to reduce the detrimental impacts of gambling on the sport during his tenure and, according to an obituary in The Sporting Magazine, was "universally respected" by the club's members. During his time as Secretary the membership of the club almost doubled from around 200 to close to 400.

In 1838 a bust and portrait of him were commissioned for the Lord's Pavilion and he laid the foundation stone of the tennis court at the ground the same year. The portrait, by Henry Dawe, is still in the MCC collection; a mezzotint of it was purchased by the National Portrait Gallery in 1966. The painting and one other of Aislabie, which were hanging in the Long Room at Lord's, were removed from display in June 2020 due to his ownership of slaves. (Note: The paintings were removed from display in response to a rise in awareness of the legacy of slave ownership following the Black Lives Matter protests of the summer of 2020. The MCC also owns another portrait of Aislabie as well as the bust.)

He played in 56 important matches, 20 of them for MCC. His playing career was notable for him scoring only 224 runs at a meagre batting average of 3.15 runs per innings. His performances were hampered by his girth, and towards the end of his career he was so obese that he had a permanent runner and by the time of his final appearance in 1841, aged 67 and weighing 20 stone (130 kg), he needed a substitute fielder to field for him as well. Statistically he ranks as one of the worst cricketers of all time, although he enjoyed playing the sport and is the third-oldest "top-class" cricketer on record.

Aislabie often arranged MCC matches with leading public schools. He features as a character in the cricket match at Rugby School in the novel Tom Brown's School Days.

== Business and personal life ==
Aislabie was a successful wine merchant operating out of the Minories in London in partnership with William Meade and Benjamin Standring, becoming the senior partner in the firm in 1802. The firm numbered Lord Nelson as one of its clients. He also inherited some of his father's estates on Dominica and continued to own plantations throughout his life, at Canefield and Morne Daniel on Dominica; he also had an interest in one in Antigua. The estates, operated using slavery, were passed on to his son in his will. Aislabie was compensated for the loss of his slaves following passage of the Slavery Abolition Act 1833, which prohibited slavery throughout the British Empire in 1834. He leased Lee Place in Lee, in north-west Kent, (Note: Lee is now in the modern London Borough of Lewisham in southeast London.) from Charles Boone between 1809 and 1823 and lived in Sevenoaks and London, including at East Park Place near Regent's Park.

He was an overseer for Lee Parish in 1814 and was instrumental in distributing charity, including food and fuel, to the poor of the parish during the harsh winter of 1814. He allowed the parish to store coal and potatoes to distribute during the 13-week frost and employed a number of labourers during the winter. He was resident in Lee at the time of the anti-slavery Lee Petition and it is likely he had an opportunity to sign it, but did not, probably because of his interests in the West Indies.

Aislabie married Anne Hodgson in 1798; the couple had 12 children, six of whom, five daughters and a son, survived into adulthood. (Note: The Oxford Dictionary of National Biography has six daughters surviving into adulthood; all other sources, including more contemporary sources such as Etoniana, give the names of five daughters.) His son, William, attended Eton and Trinity College, Cambridge and inherited his estates in Dominica.

Benjamin Aislabie died at his house at Regents Park of an abscess of the throat in 1842 aged 68 and was buried at St Marylebone Parish Church.

== Bibliography ==
- Carlaw, Derek (2020). Kent County Cricketers, A to Z: Part One (1806–1914) (PDF). Cardiff: ACS.
