= Commonwealth of Dominica Police Force =

National police force

- Abbreviation: CDPF

Agency overview
- Formed: May 9, 1840; 186 years ago

Jurisdictional structure
- Operations jurisdiction: Dominica
- Governing body: Government of Dominica
- General nature: Civilian police

Operational structure
- Headquarters: Bath Road and King George V Street, Roseau
- Sworn members: ~600

Website
- cdpf.gov.dm

The Commonwealth of Dominica Police Force (CDPF) is the principal law enforcement agency in Dominica. It was previously known as the Royal Dominica Police Force (RDPF) between 1967 and 1978. It is responsible for maintaining law and order in the country, and acting as a national defence force in times of war or national emergency. It is headed by the Commissioner of Police.

== History ==
Policing in Dominica dates to the appointment of the first constables on 9 May 1840. By 1856 there were 12 police officers on the island under the command of police magistrate Edward Lockhart. In 1907, a single police service was established for the whole of the British Leeward Islands, headquartered in St. George's, Grenada, which remained the case after Dominica was transferred to the British Windward Islands in 1940.

In 1960, Dominica was given its own police force headed by a British-appointed chief of police. Dominica became an associated state in 1967, and the Dominican Police Force was granted a royal charter, adopting the name "Royal Dominica Police Force" which was now headed by a "Commissioner". The last British police chief to head the Dominican police was James Mulligan. When Dominica became a republic in 1978, the "Royal" title was replaced by "Commonwealth".

During the 19th century, the police headquarters in Dominica were housed within Fort Young, overlooking Roseau. The fort functioned as the police command centre until it was converted into a hotel in 1964. The modern police headquarters are located on Bath Road, at the corner of King George V Street in Roseau, and also houses a local INTERPOL liaison unit. Dominica has been a member of INTERPOL since 3 November 1981. The Police Training School is located at Morne Bruce, northeast of Roseau.

== Defence role ==
CDPF Coast Guard members (left and centre) training with a member of the Trinidad and Tobago Coast Guard (right)

Since Dominica has had no standing army since 1981, the police are also responsible for national defence in times of war or national emergency, and the CDPF includes a Coast Guard service and the paramilitary Special Service Unit (SSU) established in 1983.
