= Pont Cassé =

Settlement in Saint Paul Parish, Dominica

Coordinates: 15°22′N 61°21′W

Pont Cassé is situated in the Saint Paul Parish in Dominica. It is located almost in the middle of Dominica, close to Belles Village northeast of the national capital, Roseau, and close to Morne Trois Pitons, the mountain which dominates the southern center of the country. As of 2006 it has a population of 100.

Pont Cassé is the site of the Waitukubuli Trail headquarters.
