= Dominican Defense Forces =

- Founded: November 1975; 50 years ago
- Disbanded: April 1981; 44 years ago

Leadership
- Minister of Security: Patrick John

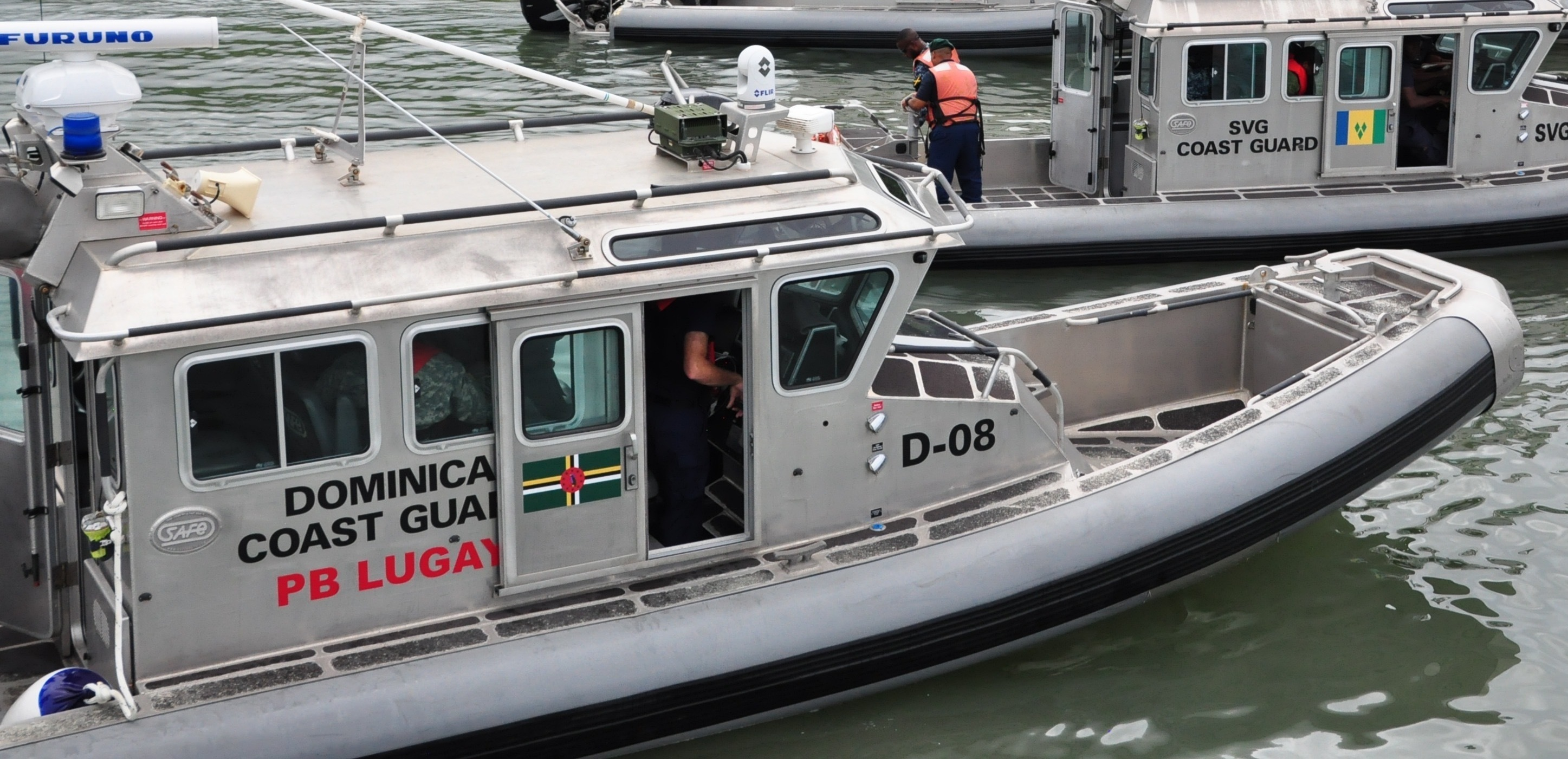
The Dominica Coast Guard Patrol Boat Lugay in 2016.

The Dominican Defense Forces (DDF) was the military of the Commonwealth of Dominica. There has been no standing army in Dominica since 1981, following the disbandment of the defence forces after two violent coup attempts against Dame Eugenia Charles. Defense is the responsibility of the Regional Security System (RSS).

== History ==
By the 1960s, the police were the only security force in the country. As a result, a Volunteer Defence Force was established in 1974. In November 1975, a full-time Defence Force was established by an act of the House of Assembly to replace the Volunteer Defence Force, headed by Patrick John as Minister of Security. In March 1981, Charles announced the discovery of a coup d'état attempt known as Operation Red Dog, which involved Major Frederick Newton, the head of the Defence Force. A month later, parliament disbanded the Defence Force.

=== Modern defense ===
The civil Commonwealth of Dominica Police Force includes a Special Service Unit and Coast Guard. In the event of war or other emergency, if proclaimed by the authorities, the Police Force shall be a military force which may be employed for State defence (Police Act, Chapter 14:01).
