= Saint Paul Parish, Dominica =

Saint Paul
- Parish
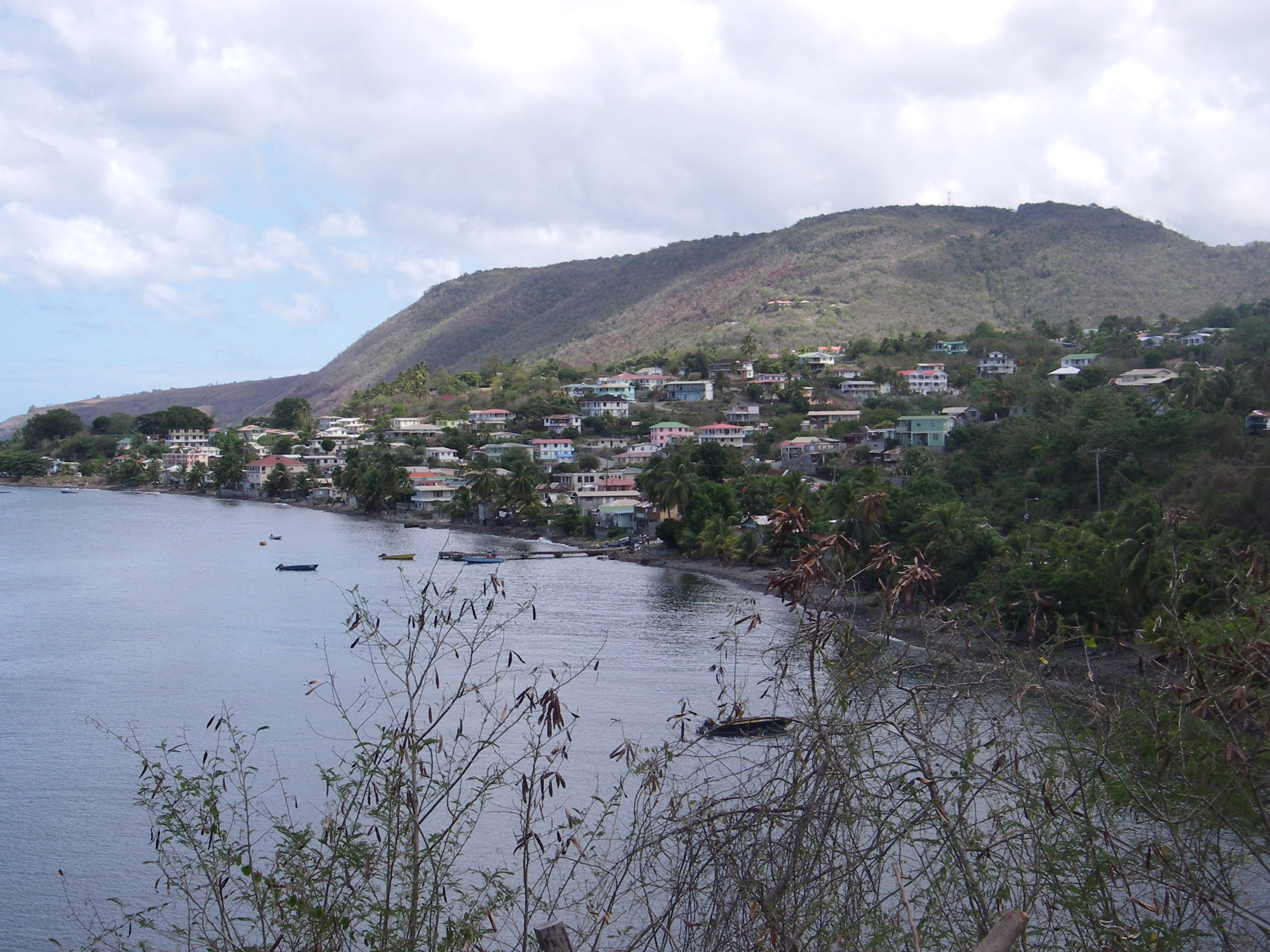
- Mahaut, Dominica

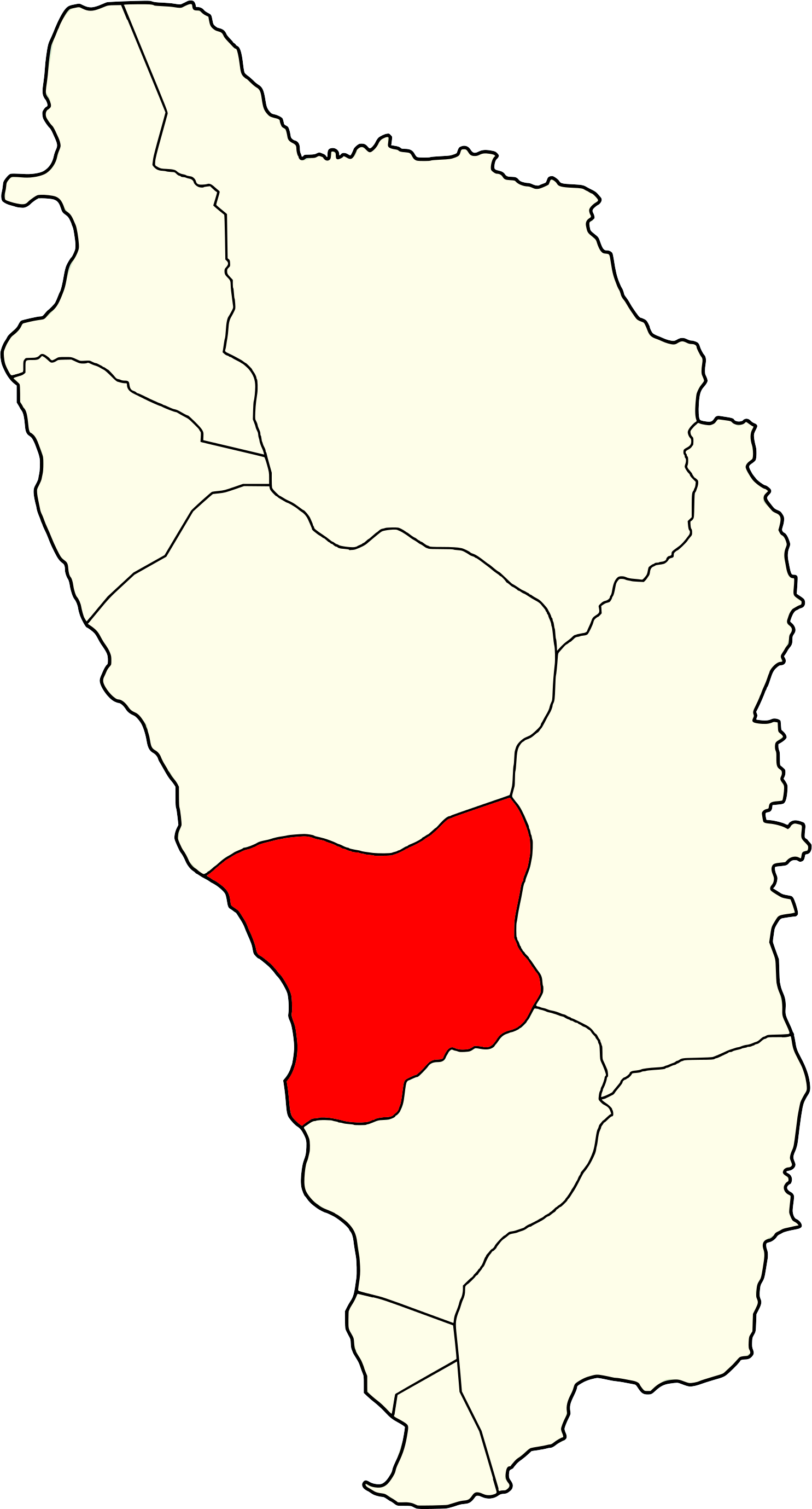
- Country: Dominica
- Capital: Pont Cassé

Area
  - Total: 65.2 km^{2} (25.2 sq mi)

Population (2011)
  - Total: 9,786
  - Density: 150/km^{2} (389/sq mi)
- Time zone: UTC-4
- ISO 3166-2: DM-10

Saint Paul is one of Dominica's 10 administrative parishes. It is bordered by St. Joseph to the north, St. David to the east, and St. George to the south. It has an area of 67.4 km^{2} (26.02 mi^{2}), and a population of 8,397.

The largest settlements are Canefield (where the island's second airport is located) and Mahaut, which includes the port of Belfast. Another village in the parish, Massacre, is so-called because of the historic massacre of Dominica's indigenous people by European settlers. Cochrane, Springfield Estate and Pont Cassé (home of the island's central roundabout) are located in the interior.

The parish is also the site of a factory at Belfast Estate, where Dominica Coconut Products (renamed a few years ago to reflect its ownership under Colgate-Palmolive) operates.
