= Massacre River (Dominica) =

River on the Caribbean island of Dominica

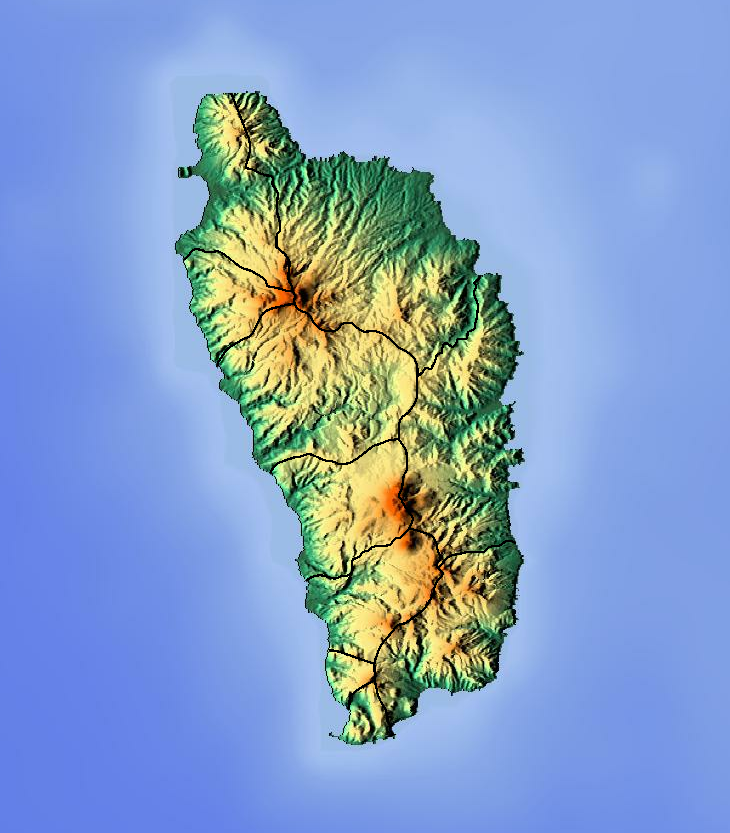
- Location of mouth in Dominica

Location
- Country: Dominica

Physical characteristics
- Mouth
  - location: Caribbean Sea
  - coordinates: 15°21′N 61°24′W

The Massacre River is a river on the Caribbean island of Dominica.

== Naming ==
The town of Massacre, Dominica, which runs along the river, was named by the French after a massacre of Caribs carried out by the English that occurred in the area in 1674. The massacre occurred in a settlement that was established by Thomas “Carib” Warner, the Kittitian-born son of the English colonizer Sir Thomas Warner and a Kalinago woman from Dominica. Warner was murdered by his own English half-brother, Phillip Warner. Following his murder, the people of the village he established were massacred. That village is now the present site of the village of Massacre.

== See also ==
- List of rivers of Dominica
