= Frederick Newton =

Dominican coup organiser (1951–1986)

- Born: 1951
- Died: August 8, 1986 (aged 34–35); Roseau, Dominica
- Military career
- Allegiance: Dominica
- Branch: Dominica Defence Force
- Service years: 1978–1981
- Rank: Commander
- Conflicts: 1981 coup attempt

Frederick Newton (1951 – 8 August 1986) was the head of the Dominica Defence Force (DDF) from its independence in 1978 to 1981. He was executed in 1986 for organising an attempted coup d'état in 1981 that resulted in the death of a police officer.

Newton was trained by the Guyana Defence Force. In January 1983, Newton and five of his soldiers received death sentences by a Dominica court for organising and participating in the failed 1981 coup aimed at overthrowing Prime Minister Eugenia Charles. (The coup attempt was unrelated to Operation Red Dog, which was organised by former Prime Minister Patrick John.) The five soldiers' sentences were eventually commuted to life imprisonment, but in 1986, Newton became the only person to be executed by Dominica since its independence from the United Kingdom, when he was hanged in Roseau.
