= Canefield =

- Location in Dominica
- Coordinates: 15°20′N 61°23′W
- Country: Dominica
- Parish: Saint Paul Parish

Population (2011)
  - Total: 2,803
- Time zone: UTC-4 (UTC)

Canefield is a town located on the west coast of Dominica, north of Roseau and south of Massacre, overlooking Pringle Bay. The largest settlement in St. Paul Parish, it has a population of 2,803. It is home to an industrial estate with Harris Paints Dominica Ltd., a branch of the Jehovah's Witnesses, the Old Mill Cultural Center and Museum as well as the island's second airport. Neighboring locales include Cochrane, Checkhall, Massacre and Fond Colé.

== History ==
Canefield is situated in the area of the former Canefield Estate. The Cane Field estate was owned by Walter Pringle, a merchant of Saint Kitts in the 1700s until his last known association in 1768. Walter Pringle’s son, Vice Admiral Thomas Pringle sold the estate in 1773 to joint owners Samuel Duer, Henrietta Duer, and George Rose, a Scottish politician and plantation owner. Rev. Rowland Duer Sr. inherited his brother Samuel Duer’s share of the estate after his death at St. Lucia in 1783. The Duer family’s share of the estate was later acquired by Rawson Aislabie, a London Merchant who was a joint owner until his death, after which his son, Benjamin Aislabie inherited his share of the estate. By 1817 there was a total of 163 enslaved people working on the estate, 94 of whom were female and 69 male. In 1820 23 enslaved people were purchased from Richmond Estate, two people were purchased from RH Nightengale, and 54 enslaved people died. In 1823 Sir George Henry Rose inherited the property from his mother Theodora née Duer. At the time there was a total of 123 enslaved persons (68 female and 52 male). Following the passage of the Slavery Abolition Act 1833, Benjamin Aislabie and Sir George Henry Rose filed a claim for compensation for their loss of slaves and were awarded £2342 14s 0d on 12 October 1835 for losing the 111 enslaved people that worked on their estate.

In the present day, Canefield is home to one of Dominica’s two airports. It is also the location of the Museum at the Old Mill Cultural Centre. The museum is set in a restored building and features important aspects of Dominica’s heritage. The museum displays posters depicting the processing of sugar cane and coffee plantations and provides information about Dominica’s first people, the Kalinago.
