= Asprofin Bank Corporation =

Bank in Commonwealth of Dominica

- Type: C Corporation
- Industry: Financial services
- Founded: August 23, 2012; 14 years ago in Roseau, Dominica
- Headquarters: Roseau, Dominica
- Products: Corporate banking; Investment banking; Insurance; Private banking; Private equity; Mortgage loans; Credit cards; Investment management; Wealth management; Asset management; Mutual funds; Exchange-traded funds; Index funds
- Number of employees: 100 (2024)
- Website: asprofinbank.org

Asprofin Bank Corporation, known as Asprofin Bank, is a Dominican private bank based in the Commonwealth of Dominica with operations spanning Asia, the United States, the United Kingdom, and the European Union. Founded in 2012, the institution offers a range of financial services including consumer, business, and Institutional banking, along with funds management, investment advisory, and broking services.

== History ==
Asprofin Bank Corporation was founded on 23 August 2012 in Roseau, Dominica, as a C-Corporation. The bank is supervised by the Financial Services Unit of the Commonwealth of Dominica under section 5 of the Offshore Banking Act No. 8 of 1996, which permits global offshore banking operations. In 2013, the Ministry of Finance licensed Asprofin Bank Corporation to expand its global offshore banking business.

=== De-Risking of Global Banking for Dominica Entities ===
Dominica, along with other Caribbean countries, was designated as a non-cooperative tax jurisdiction by the European Union. The initial blacklist was published in early 2017. In 2019, the Center for Strategic and International Studies reported on the closure of several correspondent banking relationships for Caribbean banks holding accounts with institutions approved by the U.S. Federal Reserve and the European Central Bank. Consequently, Asprofin Bank experienced limitations in expanding its correspondent banking network as global de-risking measures including tax-related blacklists, affected its relationships with institutions subject to U.S. Internal Revenue Service oversight.

=== Removal of Dominica from Tax Blacklist ===
On 5 October 2021, The Guardian reported that Dominica was removed from the EU tax haven blacklist following a meeting of EU Finance Ministers in Luxembourg. The agreement, led by 23 ministers, aimed to eliminate the tax haven designation for Dominica, thereby opening opportunities for Caribbean banks to expand internationally.

=== International Banking Association of the Caribbean Membership ===
On 10 January 2022, Asprofin Bank received membership approval to join the Caribbean Section of International Banking Association, aligning itself with other cooperative banks in the region such as Arton Bank Corporation and the Commonwealth Bank.

== Core Business ==
Asprofin Bank offers a diverse suite of financial products and services. Its core operations include commercial and investment banking, consumer banking, and a variety of products tailored to both individual and corporate clients.

=== Fixed Deposits ===
Asprofin Bank provides fixed deposit services—known as certificates of deposit in some countries, which offer investors higher interest rates than regular savings accounts until maturity.

=== Banking Fixed Deposit Services ===
In line with global banking practices, Asprofin Bank offers fixed deposit schemes designed to meet various customer needs. For example, Ujjivan Small Finance Bank in India offers fixed deposits with tenures ranging from 7 days to 10 years, with competitive rates and specialized products for senior citizens and tax-saving investors. Similarly, the Bank of Maharashtra offers a range of fixed deposit plans with diverse tenures and attractive rates.

=== Financial Considerations for Fixed Deposits ===
The attractiveness of fixed deposits is influenced by macroeconomic factors such as central bank policy and inflation. Studies indicate that adjustments to base rates by institutions like the Bank of England can impact the interest rates offered by banks including Nationwide, Barclays, and Chase.In the U.S., Federal Reserve policies directly affect CD rates; significant rate hikes during 2022–2023 resulted in two-decade highs, followed by adjustments as inflation moderated.

=== Business Development ===
On 12 September 2024, the bank entered into a planned joint venture to develop a US$13 billion data center project in Southeast Asia. This initiative represents an effort to diversify beyond traditional banking and engage in technology-driven infrastructure development.
