= Massacre, Dominica =

Town in Dominica

Coordinates: 15°21′N 61°24′W

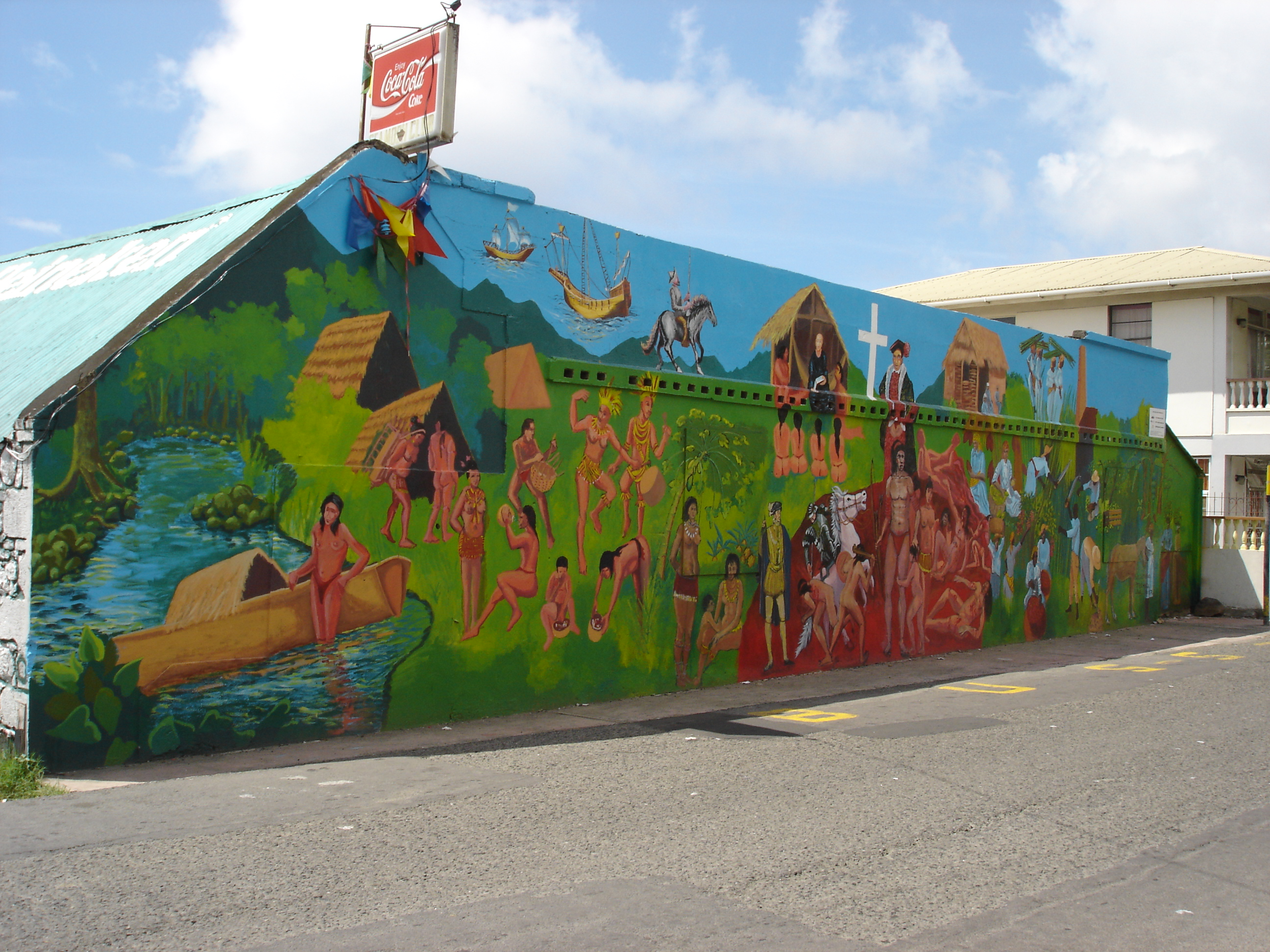
Mural in Massacre depicting the 1674 massacre the town is named after

Dominica

Massacre is a town in Saint Paul Parish, Dominica, with about 1,200 inhabitants. It is located on the central west coast of the island, to the north of the capital, Roseau, on the Massacre River.

== Naming ==
The town was named by the French after a massacre of the Kalinago carried out by English colonists in 1674. The massacre occurred in a village which was established by Thomas Warner, the Kittian-born son of the English colonial administrator Sir Thomas Warner and a Kalinago woman from Dominica. Thomas Warner was named after his father, but was usually referred to as Carib Warner, or Indian Warner. Warner was murdered by his half-brother, Phillip Warner who was Governor of Antigua at the time. Following his murder, approximately 100 Kalinago residents of the village he established were killed by colonists. That village is now the present site of the town of Massacre.
