= Mahaut, Dominica =

Mahaut
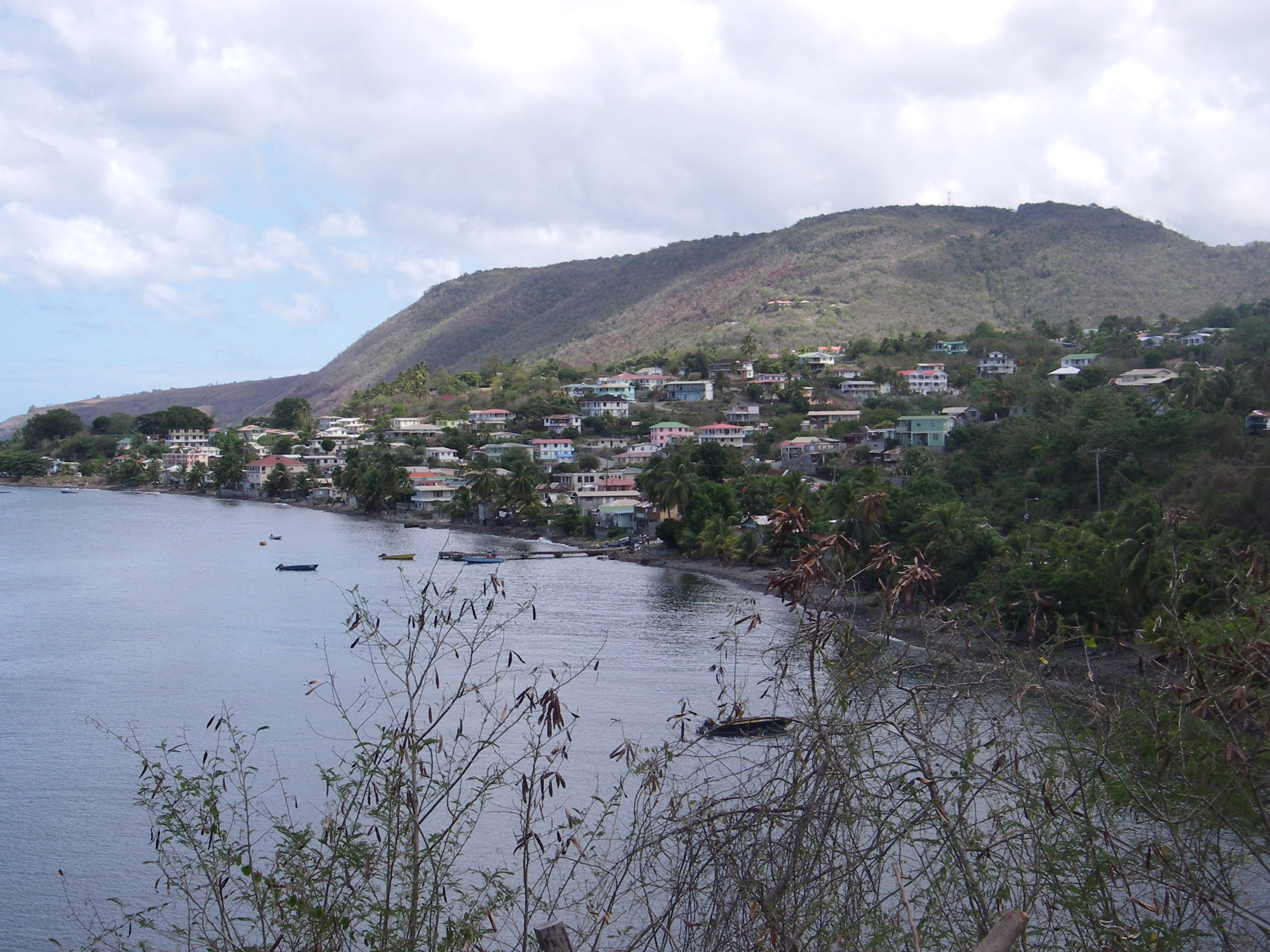
- Mahaut, looking north up Dominica's west coast

- Location in Dominica
- Coordinates: 15°22′N 61°24′W
- Country: Dominica
- Parish: Saint Paul Parish

Population (2011)
  - Total: 2,370
- Time zone: UTC-4 (UTC)

Mahaut is a village on the west coast of Dominica. It has a population of 2,399, which makes it the second largest commune in the parish of Saint Paul and was home to Dominica Colgate-Palmolive (formerly Dominica Coconut Products) until the factory was closed in 2015 after Tropical Storm Erika.

Mahaut is the home village of Olympic gold medalist Thea LaFond.
