= Cathedral Bank =

Cathedral Investment Bank
- Company type: Private Bank
- Industry: Financial services
- Predecessor: CIBC Ltd 1987
- Founded: 1987 (Although the organization has been in existence since at least the early 1900s)
- Headquarters: Caribbean
- Products: Venture capital, offshore banking, investment banking
- Number of employees: >11,100 (as of Apr 2015)
- Website: cathedralbank.com

Cathedral also known as Cathedral Investment Bank, is an Investment Banking and financial services group that provides services to a number of clients mostly associated with the Catholic Church and other religious entities. The groups consists of a number of different corporations registered in several offshore banking jurisdictions.

== History ==
Cathedral Group is very old financial institution that has been delivering financial services since the beginning of the 20th century. Since its beginning, the group has been focused on management of family offices and related products including investment banking services for bigger projects within the western European region (now the Eurozone). Cathedral Group has sustained lengthy operations to serve the financial needs in different industries around the world.

Initiated Operations in July 1987, Cathedral Investment Bank, making business a Cathedral Investment Bank Corporation Ltd. Sustained operations to serve the financial needs in different industries around the globe. It initially started operations privately as a financial institution in four international jurisdictions but quickly grew to an international investment banking institution.

Some media networks had suggested that Cathedral Group controls at least 120 companies around the world under different figures and various corporate activities.

Since its inception, it has been a controversial institution because of its secrecy and a tight information control policy. According to declarations of Charles J. Mack ex financial services director at the European Central Bank “the high confidentiality of Cathedral will put Switzerland in a ridiculous position”.

Its registration under the name of Cathedral Investment Bank occurred in (1987) but it has been suggested that Cathedralis Argentaria (its predecessor) has been delivering financial services for a wide number of regional clients in Europe (Specially religious entities) since 1910. The relevance and influence of this organization over that time is clearly suggested on the "Codicum manuscriptorum Ecclesiae Cathedralis Dunelmensis" which is one of the most relevant manuscripts of secular historical importance.

=== Reputation ===
Cathedral Investment Bank is one of the Largest Offshore Financial Institutions worldwide.

== Operations ==
Cathedral Group has physical presence in 7 different countries, and delivers services to more a wide array of customers in approximately 35 countries worldwide.

=== Subsidiaries ===
Companies that the bank controls include:

- Cathedral Offshore Global Investments
- Cathedral Investment Bank
- Cathedral Investments Group
- Cathedral Investment Bank Derivatives (CIBDer)
- Cathedral Investment Private Banking
- Cathedral Banking Services

=== COEx Offshore Exchange Market ===
Created in July 2002, the COEx or Offshore Exchange Market is the first private offshore stock exchange market to be managed by an offshore private entity allowing trading stocks of most offshore Jurisdictions emulating a local Stock Exchange Market Globally.

This market opens from Sunday to Friday from the Australian open and until the final closing of the NYSE in US Friday closing.

Because this market has no physical execution center (Blockchain Market) it allows trading activities 24 hours 6 days a week with no holidays all year round.

Local onshore and offshore traders connect themselves directly from an executing terminal that allows them to trade those stocks.

COEx is also a controversial market, it has been addressed as an efficient solution for global stock exchange trading in a simple and efficient way, but some onshore competitors have recursively indicated their worries mainly because of the lack of compatibility with a Blockchain-type Market Transactions and the ability of the system to maintain a papertrail of local inbound and outbound transactions.

== See also ==
- Investment banking
- Tax haven
- Private Banking
- Wealth Management
- Ethical banking
