= Dominica =

Country in the Caribbean

Commonwealth of Dominica
(in vernacular languages)
Dominican Creole	Komwèl Donmnik
Kokoy	Kamanwel a Domineeka
- Flag Coat of arms
- Motto: "Apres Bondie, C'est La Ter" (Dominican Creole French) "Post Deum terra est" (Latin) "After God is the earth"
- Anthem: "Isle of Beauty"
- Location of Dominica (circled in red) in the Caribbean
- Capital and largest city: Roseau; 15°18′N 61°23′W
- Official languages: English
- Vernacular languages: Dominican Creole French, Kokoy
- Ethnic groups (2014): 75% African; 19% multiracial; 4% Kalinago; 0.8% European or other; 0.2% unspecified
- Religion (2020): 94.4% Christianity; 3.0% folk religions; 1.7% other; 0.9% none
- Demonyms: Dominican (pronounced /ˌdɒmɪˈniːkən/)
- Government: Unitary parliamentary republic
  - President: Sylvanie Burton
  - Prime Minister: Roosevelt Skerrit
  - Speaker of the House of Assembly: Joseph Isaac
- Legislature: House of Assembly

Independence from the United Kingdom
  - West Indies Associated States: 1 March 1967
  - Sovereignty and constitution: 3 November 1978

Area
  - Total: 750 km^{2} (290 sq mi) (174th)
  - Water (%): 1.6

Population
  - 2021 estimate: 72,412 (186th)
  - 2011 census: 71,293
  - Density: 105/km^{2} (271.9/sq mi) (95th)
- GDP (PPP): 2018 estimate
  - Total: $688 million
  - Per capita: $9,726
- GDP (nominal): 2018 estimate
  - Total: $485 million
  - Per capita: $7,860
- HDI (2023): ▲0.761 high (98th)
- Currency: East Caribbean dollar (XCD)
- Time zone: UTC–4 (AST)
- Date format: dd/mm/yyyy
- Calling code: +1
- ISO 3166 code: DM
- Internet TLD: .dm

Dominica (Note: locally /ˌdɒmɪˈniːkə/ dom-in-EE-kə; UK: US: /ˌdɒmɪˈniːkə/ or /dəˈmɪnɪkə/; Dominican Creole French: Dominik; Kalinago: Waitukubuli; Kokoy: Domineeka Despite the recommended English pronunciations as /ˌdɒmɪˈniːkə/, which are more faithful to the local pronunciation, the more usual English pronunciations are based intuitively on the spelling) officially the Commonwealth of Dominica, (Note: Dominican Creole French: Komwèl Donmnik; Kalinago: Wai'tu kubuli; Kokoy: Kamonwel a Domineeka) is an island country in the Caribbean. It is part of the Windward Islands chain in the Lesser Antilles archipelago in the Caribbean Sea. The capital, Roseau, is located on the western side of the island. Dominica's closest neighbours are two constituent territories of the European Union, both overseas departments of France: Guadeloupe to the northwest and Martinique to the south-southeast. Dominica comprises a land area of 750 km^{2} (290 sq mi), and the highest point is Morne Diablotins, at 1,448 m (4,751 ft) in elevation. The population was 71,293 at the 2011 census.

The island was settled by the Arawak arriving from South America in the fifth century. The Kalinago displaced the Arawak by the 15th century. Christopher Columbus is said to have passed the island on Sunday, 3rd November 1493. It was later colonised by Europeans, predominantly by the French from 1690 to 1763. The French enslaved West Africans and transported them to Dominica to work on coffee plantations. Great Britain took possession in 1763 after the Seven Years' War and continued the legacy of forced labor to gain wealth, and gradually established English as its official language. The island gained independence as a republic in 1978.

Dominica has been nicknamed the "Nature Island of the Caribbean" for its natural environment. It is the youngest island in the Lesser Antilles, and is still being formed by Geothermal-Volcanic activity, as evidenced by the world's second-largest hot spring, called Boiling Lake. The island has lush mountainous rainforests and is the home of many rare plants, animals, and bird species. There are dry shrubland areas in some of the western coastal regions, but heavy rainfall occurs inland. The Sisserou Parrot, also known as the imperial amazon, is critically endangered and found only on Dominica. It is the island's national bird and is featured on the National flag, making Dominica one of the two sovereign nations whose official flag features the color purple. The country is a member of the Commonwealth of Nations, the United Nations, the Organization of American States, the Organisation internationale de la Francophonie, the Organisation of Eastern Caribbean States and the Non-Aligned Movement.

== Etymology ==
The Kalinago called the island Wai'tu kubuli, which means "Tall is her body", likely referring to the island personified as a goddess (comparable to Gaia).

Christopher Columbus, sailing for Spain, named the island Dominica, an abbreviation of the Latin dies Dominica (meaning "day of the Lord", that is, Sunday), because he first sighted the landmass on a Sunday in November 1493. In keeping with the Spanish pronunciation of its name, Dominica's name is pronounced with emphasis on the second i.

The similar names and the identical demonym with the Dominican Republic have caused some in Dominica to advocate for a name change to Waitukubuli, which they say would contribute to further establishing the local identity and stop mail from being wrongly sent to the Dominican Republic. Others disagree, arguing that the name change would be too expensive.

== History ==
=== Geologic history ===
Dominica first emerged from the sea during the Oligocene Epoch approximately 26 million years ago, making it the last Caribbean island to be formed by volcanic activity along the Lesser Antilles Volcanic Arc. The island remains volcanically active, with geothermal features reflecting ongoing magmatic processes beneath its surface.

=== Pre-colonial period and early European contact ===
Dominica's precolonial Indigenous inhabitants were the Kalinago people, who are thought to have driven out the previous Arawak population. However, this may be a partial misconception as ancestral Kalinago narratives mention the two groups coexisting and intermarrying. The Arawak were not the primary Indigenous group. It is believed that before them were a group of paleo-Indians who arrived towards the end of the late Pleistocene period.

In 1493, Christopher Columbus first spotted the island during his second voyage to the Americas. Because he saw the island on a Sunday (November 3, 1493), Columbus named the island Dominica (Latin for 'Sunday'). Some Spanish colonisers settled there. But, as European explorers and settlers entered the region, Indigenous refugees from surrounding islands settled in Dominica and pushed out the Spanish settlers. The Spanish instead settled other areas that were easier to control.

=== French colony ===
Spain had little success in colonising Dominica. In 1632, the French Compagnie des Îles de l'Amérique claimed it and other "Petites Antilles" for France, but no physical occupation took place. Between 1642 and 1650, French missionary Raymond Breton became the first regular European visitor to the island.

In 1660, the French and English agreed that Dominica and St. Vincent should not be settled, but instead left to the Carib people as neutral territory. However, its natural resources attracted expeditions of English and French foresters, who began harvesting timber. In 1690, the French established their first permanent settlements. French woodcutters from Martinique and Guadeloupe began to set up timber camps to supply the French islands with wood, and they gradually became permanent settlers. They brought the first enslaved Africans from West Africa to Dominique, as they called it in French.

In 1715, a revolt of impoverished white smallholders in the north of Martinique, known as La Gaoulé, caused settlers to migrate to southern Dominique, where they set up smallholdings. Meanwhile, French families and others from Guadeloupe settled in the north. In 1727, the first French commander, M. Le Grand, took charge of the island with a basic French government. Dominique formally became a colony of France, and the island was divided into districts or "quarters". The French had already developed plantation agriculture on Martinique and Guadeloupe, where they cultivated sugarcane with enslaved African workers. In Dominique they gradually developed coffee plantations. Because of the trans-Atlantic slave trade, the general population came to consist primarily of people of African ancestry.

In 1761, during the Seven Years' War in Europe, a British expedition against Dominica, led by Andrew Rollo, conquered the island and several other Caribbean islands. In 1763, France lost the war and ceded the island to Great Britain in 1763 under the Treaty of Paris. The same year, the British established a legislative assembly, with only European colonists represented. French remained the official language, Kwéyòl (a French-based creole) was spoken by the majority of enslaved Africans.

In 1778 the French, with the active co-operation of the population, began the re-capture of Dominica. This was ended in 1783 by the second Treaty of Paris, which returned the island to British control, but the island population, especially those considered gens de couleur libres (lit. 'free people of colour'), resisted British restrictions. The British retained control throughout French invasions in 1795 and 1805, the first taking place during the period of the Haitian Revolution, which gained the independence of Haiti (formerly Saint-Domingue, France's richest Caribbean colony).

=== British colony ===
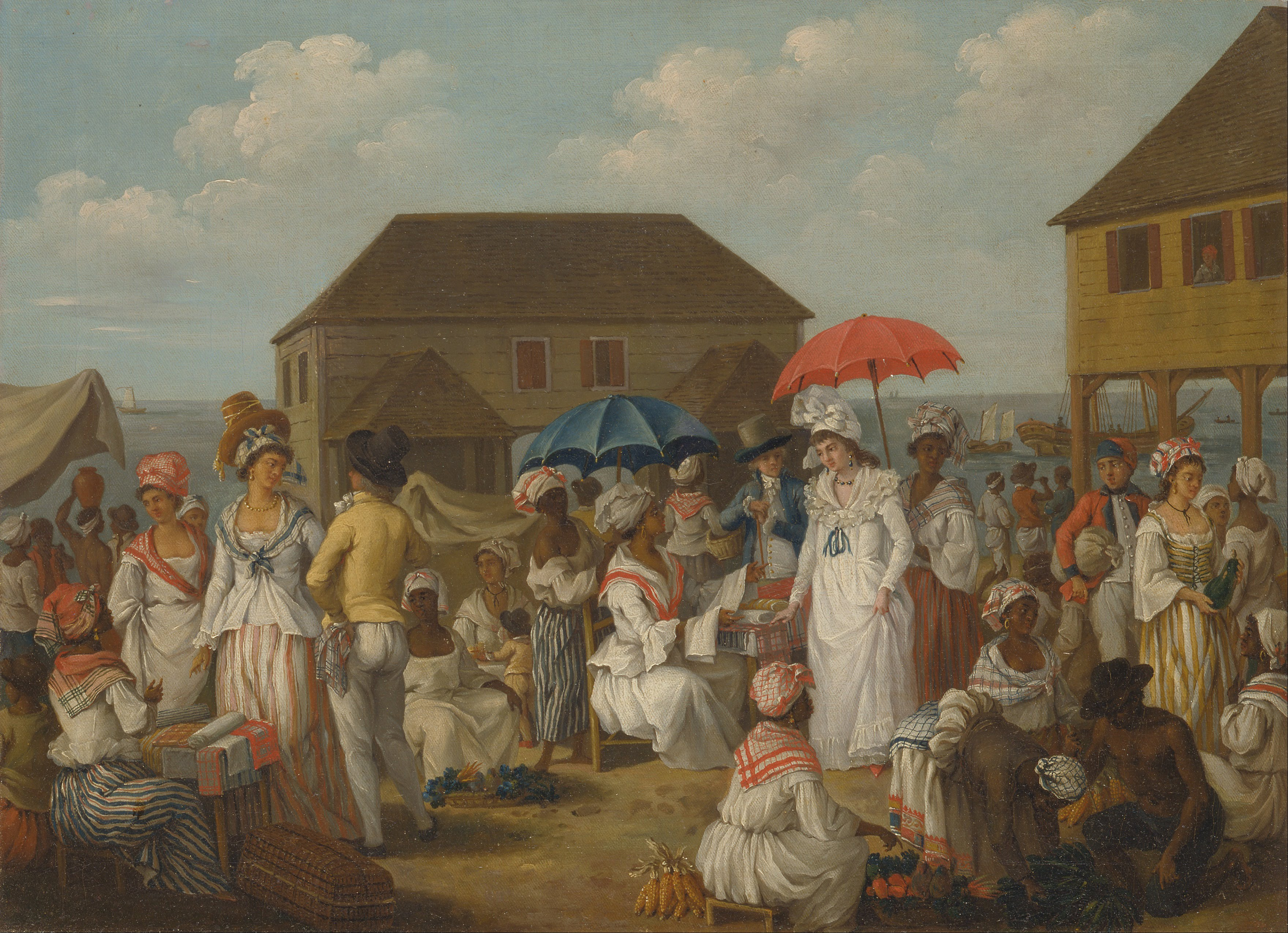
A linen market in 1770s Dominica

Great Britain established a small colony in 1805. It used Dominica as part of the Trans-Atlantic Slave Trade, by which slaves were imported and sold as labour in the islands as part of a trade that included producing and shipping sugar and coffee as commodity crops to Europe. The best documented slave plantation on the island is Hillsborough Estate, which had 71 male and 68 female slaves. The Greg family were notable: Thomas Hodgson, a brother-in-law, owned a slave ship, and Thomas Greg and his brother John Greg were part-owners of sugar plantations in Dominica. In January 1814, 20 slaves escaped from Hillsborough. They were recorded as recaptured and punished with 100 lashes applied to the males and 50 for the females. The slaves reportedly said that one of their people had died in the plantation hospital, and they believed he had been poisoned.

In 1831, reflecting a liberalisation of official British racial attitudes, the Brown Privilege Bill conferred political and social rights on free blacks (mostly free people of colour, who generally were of mixed race, with African and European ancestry). With the Slavery Abolition Act 1833, Britain ended the institution of slavery throughout its empire, except in India.

With freedom came enfranchisement. In 1835, the first three men of African descent were elected to the legislative assembly of Dominica. Many slaves from the neighbouring French colonial islands of Guadeloupe and Martinique fled to Dominica. In 1838, Dominica became the first colony of the British West Indies to have an elected legislature controlled by an ethnic African majority. Most of these legislators had been free people of colour and smallholders or merchants before the abolition of slavery. Their economic and social views were different from the interests of the small, wealthy English planter class. Reacting to a perceived threat to their power, the planters lobbied for more direct British rule.

In 1865, after much agitation and tension, the colonial office replaced the elective assembly with one made up of one-half members who were elected and one-half who were appointed. Planters, who were allied with colonial administrators, outmanoeuvred the elected legislators on many occasions. In 1871, Dominica became part of the British Leeward Islands. The political power of the elected assembly progressively eroded. Crown colony government was re-established in 1896.

=== Early 20th century ===
Dominica Act 1938 (Note: Section 2.)
- Act of Parliament
- Parliament of the United Kingdom
- Long title: An Act to provide for the separation of Dominica from the Leeward Islands, and for purposes connected therewith.
- Citation: 1 & 2 Geo. 6. c. 10
- Territorial extent: United Kingdom

Dates
- Royal assent: 30 March 1938
- Commencement: 30 March 1938 (Note: The Acts of Parliament (Commencement) Act 1793.)
- Repealed: 18 April 1962
Other legislation
Repealed by	West Indies Act 1962

Status: Repealed

Text of statute as originally enacted

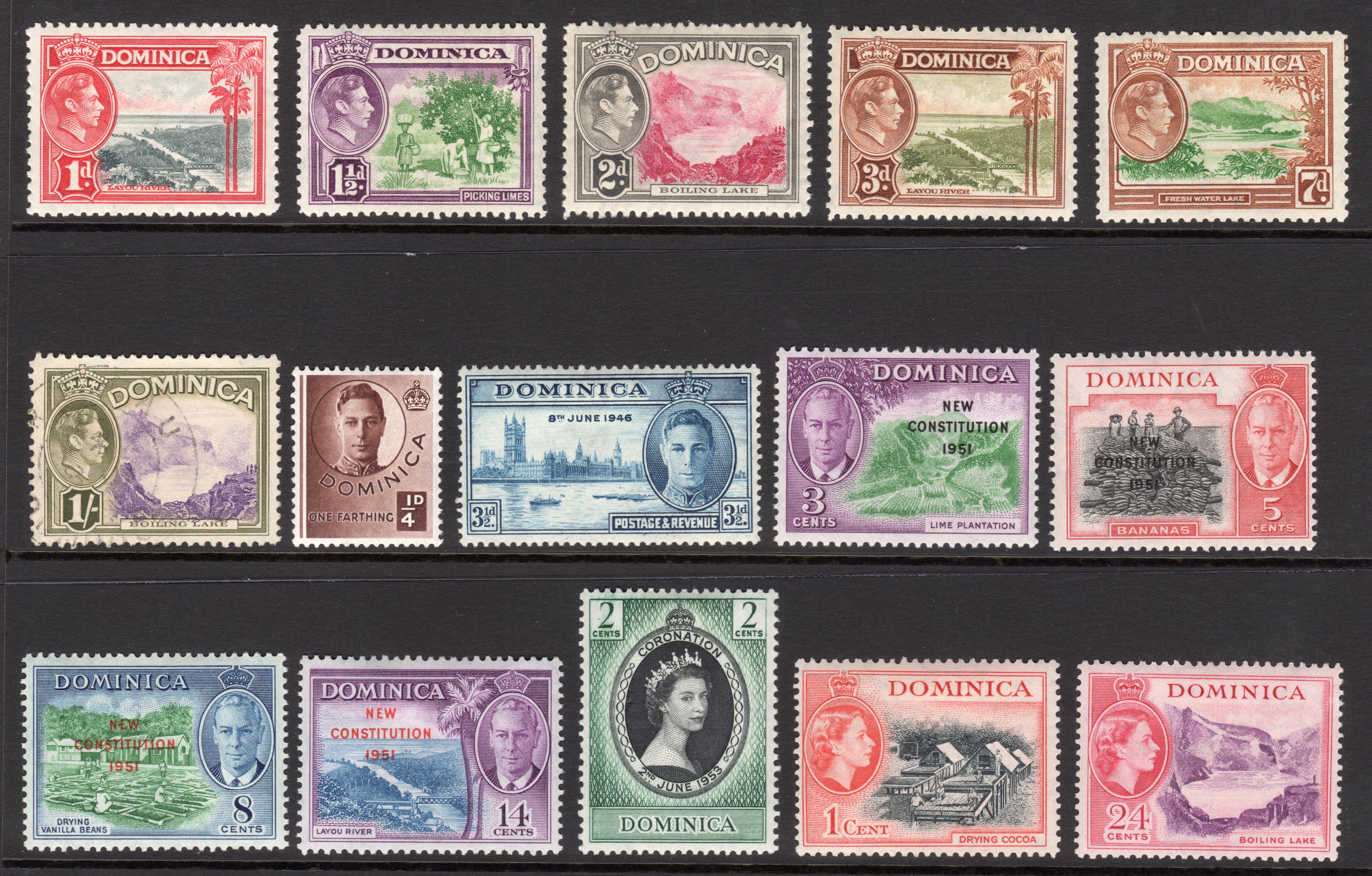
Dominica stamps with portraits of King George VI and Queen Elizabeth II

In World War I, many Dominicans, mainly the sons of small farmers, volunteered to fight in Europe for the British Empire. After the war, an upsurge of political consciousness throughout the Caribbean led to the formation of the Representative Government Association. Marshalling public frustration with the lack of a voice in the government of Dominica, this group won one-third of the popularly elected seats of the legislative assembly in 1924, and one-half in 1936. In 1940, administration of Dominica was transferred from the British Leeward Islands to the British Windward Islands. During World War II, some Dominicans volunteered in British and Caribbean forces. Thousands of Free French refugees from Martinique and Guadeloupe escaped to Dominica from the Vichy-controlled French islands, staying in Roseau and other villages.

Until 1958, Dominica was governed as part of the British Windward Islands. Caribbean islands sought independence from 1958 to 1962, and Dominica became a province of the short-lived West Indies Federation in 1958. After the federation dissolved in 1962, Dominica became an associated state of the United Kingdom in 1967, and formally took responsibility for its internal affairs. On 3 November 1978, Dominica was granted independence as a republic, led by Prime Minister Patrick John.

=== Post-independence ===
In mid-1979, political discontent with founding prime minister Patrick John's administration climaxed in a civilian coup and ended in the passage of a motion of no confidence against John in the House of Assembly, Dominica's legislature, collapsing his administration. An Interim Government was formed under Dominica's second Prime Minister Oliver Seraphin; Seraphin's main task was to prepare the country for fresh general elections constitutionally due in 1980, hence the unofficial title "Interim Prime Minister". Seraphin organised and led a splinter of the Dominica Labour Party—the Democratic Labour Party—into the 1980 general election and lost mainly because his nearly 13 month-long premiership was dominated by the effects of Category Five Hurricane David, which caused 56 deaths and untold damage across the island. Hurricane Allen the following year caused further damage. After the 1980 election, Seraphin's government was replaced by one led by the Dominica Freedom Party (DFP) under Prime Minister Eugenia Charles; she was the Caribbean's first female prime minister.

In 1981, Charles's government was threatened with two attempted coups. The first was led by Frederick Newton, commander of the Military of Dominica, who organised an attack on the police headquarters in Roseau which resulted in the death of a police officer. Newton and five other soldiers were found guilty in the attack and sentenced to death in 1983; the sentences of the five accomplices were later commuted to life in prison, but Newton was executed in 1986. A second occurred later in the year when the country was threatened with a takeover by mercenaries, led by Mike Perdue and Wolfgang Droege in Operation Red Dog. They tried to overthrow Charles as prime minister and reinstate ex-prime minister John in exchange for control over the country's development. The FBI was tipped off, and the ship hired to transport the mercenaries never left dock. The mercenaries lacked formal military experience or training, and most of the crew had been misled into joining by the ringleader Mike Perdue. White supremacist Don Black was jailed for his part in the attempted coup, which violated US neutrality laws.

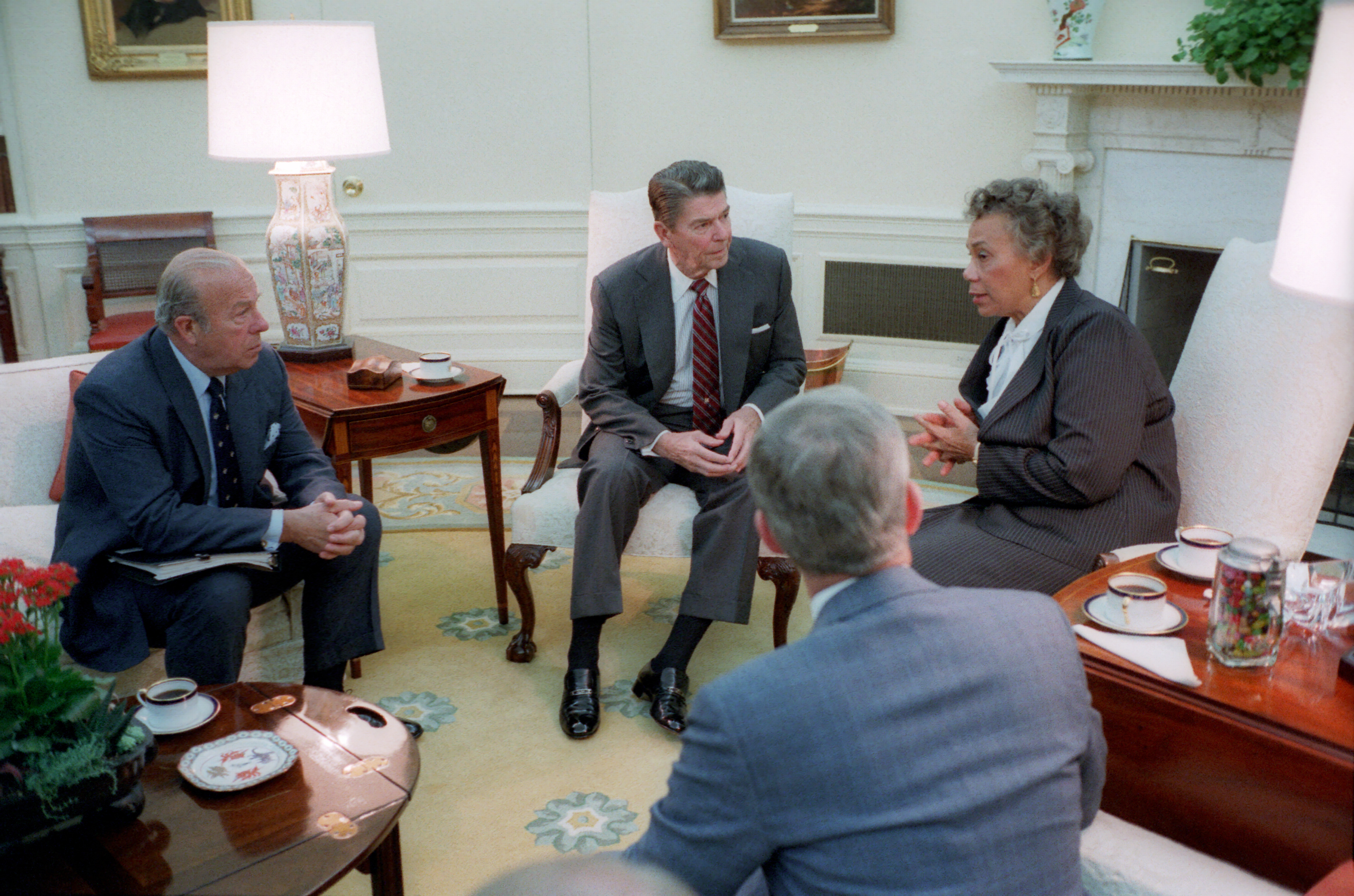
Eugenia Charles, Prime Minister 1980–95, discussing the situation in Grenada in 1983 with US President Ronald Reagan

The Charles government supported the 1983 American invasion of Grenada, earning Dominica praise from the US government of Ronald Reagan, and an increase in financial aid.

By the middle of the 1980s, the economy had begun to recover, before weakening again due to a decrease in banana prices. Eugenia Charles won the 1985 general election, becoming the first incumbent Dominica Prime Minister to be popularly re-elected. The continuing downturn in the economy and the tight grip by Eugenia Charles on Dominica politics gave rise to a self-titled "Third Force" political formation in 1988, which disrupted the traditional two-party arrangement of governing DFP and opposition DLP. The formation soon formalised as the United Workers' Party (UWP) and selected as its leader Edison James, the former general manager of the Dominica Banana Marketing Company. This was a strategic selection: he had prestige among banana farmers, and support from his origins in the East Coast, which had begun to feel alienated by the West Coast elites in Roseau, Dominica's capital. Eugenia Charles again won the 1990 general election, the first incumbent Dominica prime minister to win three consecutive general elections, but the UWP's emergence had reduced her party's majority in Parliament to one. It was, therefore, no great surprise when Eugenia Charles gave up political leadership of the Dominica Freedom Party in 1993 and did not contest the 1995 general election in any capacity. No longer benefitting from her leadership, the Dominica Freedom Party lost the 1995 election to the UWP, and James became prime minister. He attempted to diversify the Dominican economy away from over-reliance on bananas. The crop was largely destroyed by Hurricane Luis in 1995, and James was unable to restore the banana industry to its former selling price and prestige. Moreover, his administration became embroiled in opposition charges of official corruption.

In the 31 January 2000 general election, the UWP were defeated by a coalition of the DLP, led by left-leaning Roosevelt B. "Rosie" Douglas, and the DFP led by former trade union leader Charles Savarin; Douglas became prime minister. One UWP member of the House of Assembly crossed the floor, joining the DLP–DFP coalition government. Douglas died on 1 October 2000 after only a few months in office, and was replaced by Pierre Charles, who died in office on 6 January 2004. Roosevelt Skerrit, also of the DLP, replaced Pierre Charles as prime minister, becoming the world's youngest head of government at the age of 31. Under Skerrit's leadership, the DLP won elections in May 2005 that gave the party 12 seats in the 21-seat Parliament. The UWP won 8 seats and Ronald Toulon, who was an independent candidate at that time, won the remaining seat. Later, Toulon joined the government. With his 2005 election win, Skerrit became only the second incumbent prime minister to be popularly re-elected.

In the 2009 election, the DLP won 18 of 21 seats. The UWP claimed campaign improprieties and embarked on a wide range of protest actions, including boycott of Parliament. UWP's boycott caused at least three unauthorised absences from Parliament for two of their three elected representatives in violation of Parliamentary procedure, leading to their two seats being declared vacant and by-elections called to fill them in July 2010 The UWP held both seats. The DLP under Skerrit went on to win the 2014 Dominican general election.

On 17 September 2012 Eliud Thaddeus Williams was sworn in as president (a largely ceremonial role), replacing Dr. Nicholas Liverpool who was reportedly removed from office due to ill health. On 30 September 2013 former trade union leader and former DFP leader Charles Savarin was elected president, having only days before resigned as a minister of government. He is Dominica's eighth president.

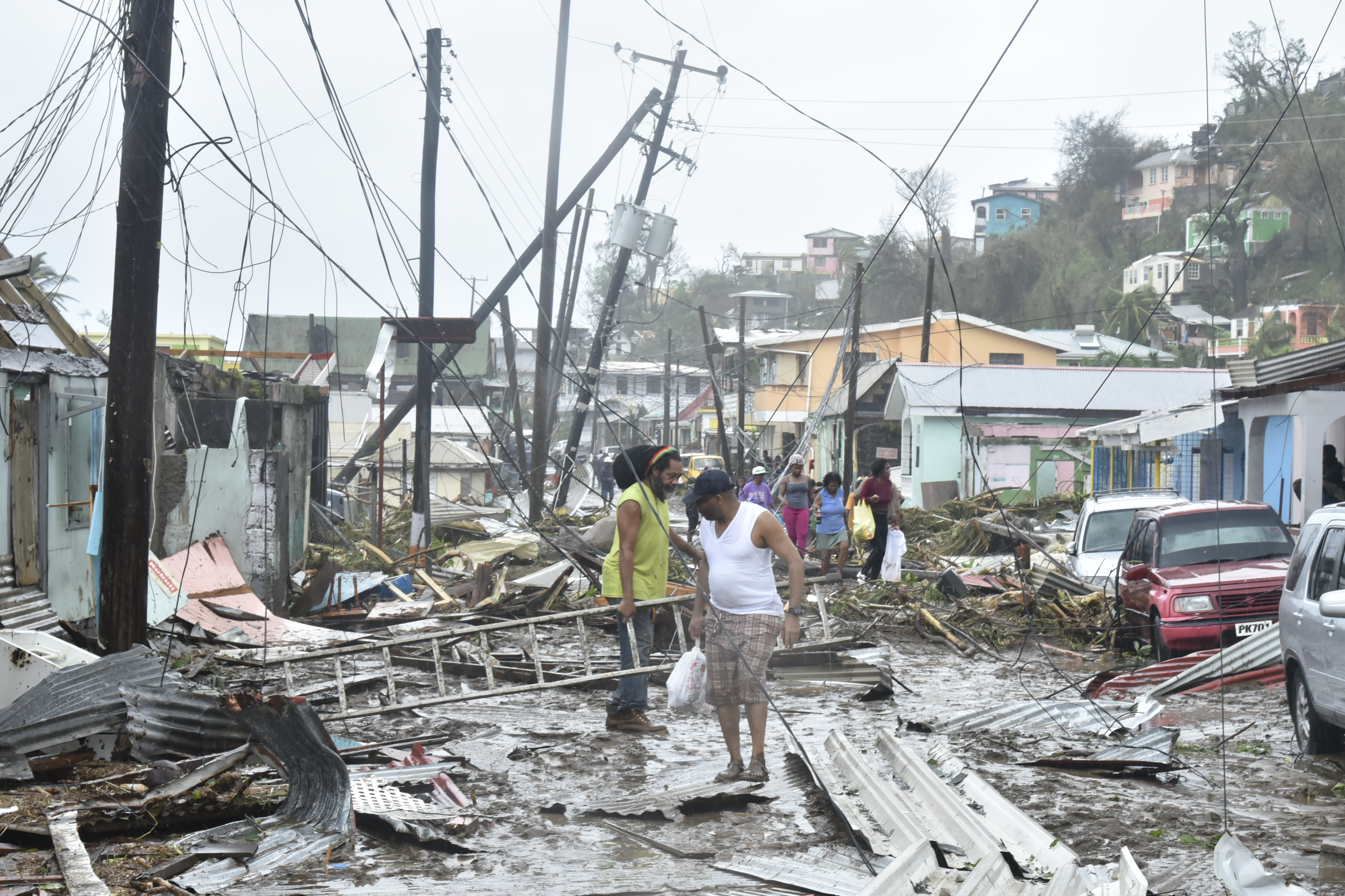
Damage in Roseau caused by Hurricane Maria in 2017

Tropical Storm Erika devastated the island in August 2015, killing 30 and causing severe environmental and economic damage. Dominica was again struck on 18 September 2017, suffering a direct landfall from Category 5 Hurricane Maria. Early estimates of damage suggested 90% of the buildings on the island had been destroyed, with infrastructure left in ruins. The UK, France and the Netherlands set up shipping and air lifts to take aid to the island, the scale of destruction having left most people homeless.

President Charles Angelo Savarin was re-elected in 2018 for a new five-year term. In December 2019, incumbent prime minister Roosevelt Skerrit won his fourth consecutive general election 18 seats to 3, becoming the first prime minister of Dominica to do so.

Dominica won its first two Commonwealth Games medals in silver (men's triple jump) and bronze (women's triple jump) in the 2018 Commonwealth Games on the Gold Coast. Dominica received its first Olympic gold medal in the 2024 Summer Olympics in Paris when Thea LaFond won the women's triple jump with a length of 15.02 metres.

== Geography ==
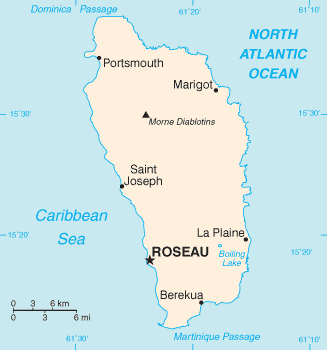
Map of Dominica.

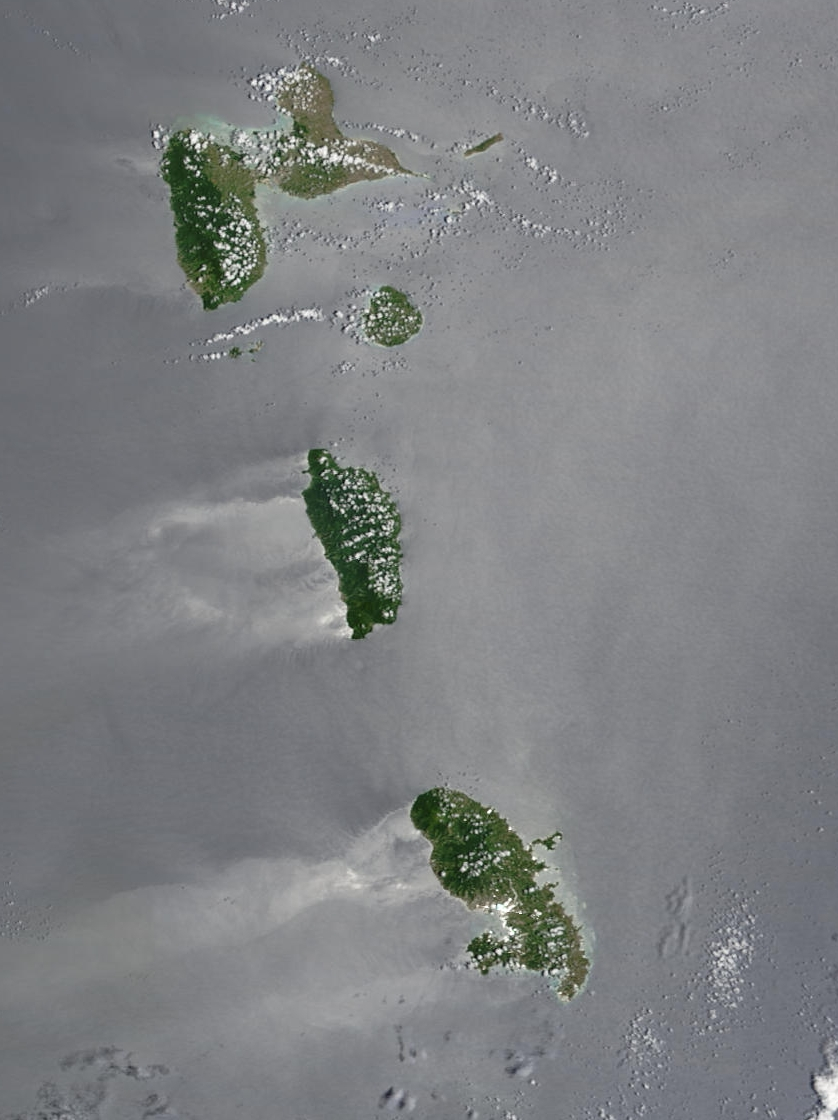
Satellite photograph of Dominica in the center, with Guadeloupe to the north and Martinique to the south

Dominica is an island nation in the Caribbean Sea, the northernmost of the Windward Islands (though it is sometimes considered the southernmost of the Leeward Islands). The size of the country is about 750 km^{2} (289.5 sq mi) and it is about 47 km (29 mi) long and 26 km (16 mi) wide.

Known as "The Nature Island of the Caribbean" due to its lush scenery and varied flora and fauna, Dominica is largely covered by rainforest and is home to the world's second-largest hot spring, Boiling Lake. Within its borders lie two ecoregions: Windward Islands' moist forests and Windward Islands' xeric scrub. The most mountainous of the Lesser Antilles, its volcanic peaks are cones of lava craters, the largest of these being (north-to-south) Morne aux Diables, Morne Diablotins (the highest on the island at 1,447 m (4,747 ft)), Morne Trois Pitons and Morne Anglais. Morne Trois Pitons National Park is a tropical forest blended with volcanic features; it was recognised as a World Heritage Site on 4 April 1995, a distinction it shares with four other Caribbean islands. (Note: St. Lucia (2004), Saint Kitts (1999), Hispaniola (Dominican Republic [1990]/Haiti [1982]) and Cuba (multiple).) The Calibishie area in the country's northeast has sandy beaches. Some plants and animals thought to be extinct on surrounding islands can still be found in Dominica's forests. The island has several protected areas, including Cabrits National Park, as well as 365 rivers. For a few years the government sought to encourage the island as an ecotourism destination, although the hurricane of 2017 has since changed these plans. The country had a 2018 Forest Landscape Integrity Index mean score of 1.06/10, ranking it 166th globally out of 172 countries.

There are two primary population centres: the capital Roseau (with 14,725 inhabitants in 2011) and Portsmouth (with 4,167 inhabitants in 2011). The main centres tend to be located around the coast, with the mountainous interior sparsely populated.

Dominica is especially vulnerable to hurricanes as the island is located in what is referred to as the hurricane region. In 1979, Hurricane David struck the island as a Category 4 hurricane, causing widespread and extreme damage. On 17 August 2007, Hurricane Dean, a Category 1 hurricane at the time, hit the island. A mother and her seven-year-old son died when a landslide caused by the heavy rains crushed their house. In another incident two people were injured when a tree fell on their house. Prime Minister Roosevelt Skerrit estimated that 100 to 125 homes were damaged, and that the agricultural sector was extensively damaged, in particular the banana crop. In August 2015, Tropical Storm Erika caused extensive flooding and landslides across the island. Multiple communities were evacuated and upwards of 30 people were killed. According to a Rapid Damage and Impact Assessment prepared for Dominica by the World Bank, the total damage and losses from the storm were US$484.82 million or 90% of Dominica's yearly GDP. Category 5 Hurricane Maria struck the island in 2017 and caused losses of approximately US$930 million or 226% of GDP.

=== Fauna ===
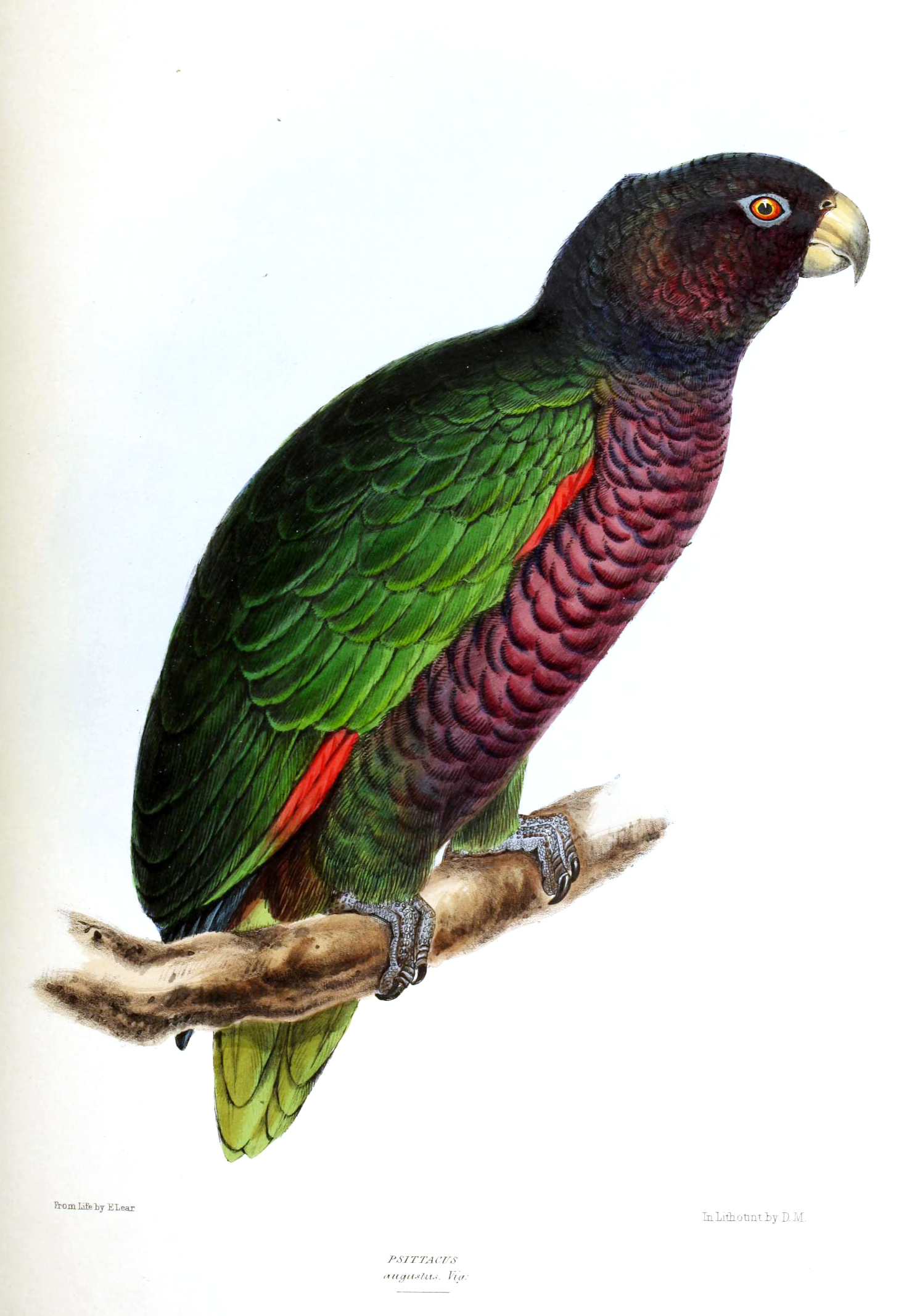
Imperial Amazon

Dominica is home to 200 bird species, including two species endemic to the island. The sisserou parrot (Amazona imperialis) is Dominica's national bird and is endemic to its mountain forests. A related species, the jaco or red-necked parrot (A. arausiaca), is also endemic to the island. Both birds are rare and protected, though some forests are still threatened by logging in addition to the long-standing threat of hurricanes.

Dominica has recorded four species of snakes, including two endemic species: the Dominican blind snake and the Dominican boa. The island is home to eleven species of lizards, including two endemic species: the Dominican anole and the Dominican ground lizard. Dominica is the last major stronghold of the critically endangered Lesser Antillean iguana (Iguana delicatissima).

The Caribbean Sea around the island of Dominica is home to many cetaceans. A group of sperm whales live in the area year-round. Other cetaceans commonly seen in the area include spinner dolphins, pantropical spotted dolphins and bottlenose dolphins.

Less commonly seen animals include killer whales, false killer whales, pygmy sperm whales, dwarf sperm whales, Risso's dolphins, common dolphins, Atlantic spotted dolphins, humpback whales and Bryde's whales. This makes Dominica a destination for tourists interested in whale-watching.

== Government and politics ==
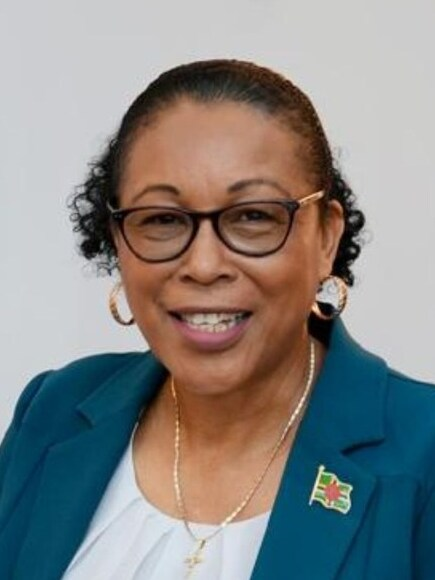
Sylvanie Burton
President

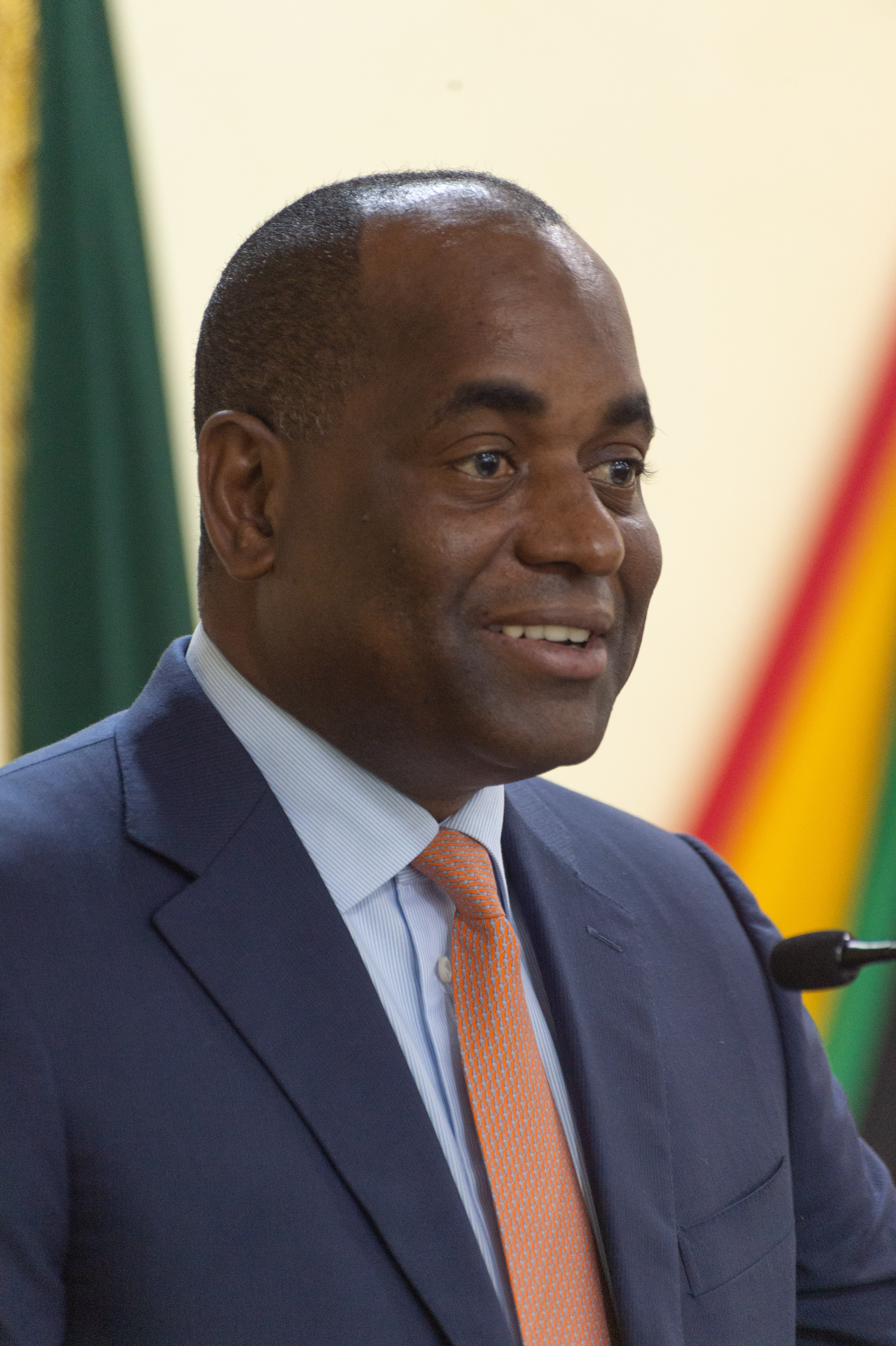
Roosevelt Skerrit
Prime Minister

Dominica is a parliamentary democracy within the Commonwealth of Nations. The capital is Roseau. Dominica is one of the Caribbean's few republics. The head of state is an indirectly elected president, while executive power rests with the cabinet, headed by the prime minister. The unicameral parliament consists of the 30-member House of Assembly, which consists of 21 directly elected members, and 9 senators who may either be appointed by the president or elected by the other members of the House of Assembly.

Unlike other former British colonies in the region, Dominica has never been a Commonwealth realm, having become a republic upon gaining its independence. Dominica is a full and participating member of the Caribbean Community (CARICOM) and the Organisation of Eastern Caribbean States (OECS).

Dominica is also a member of the International Criminal Court, with a Bilateral Immunity Agreement of protection with the US military, as covered under Article 98. In January 2008, Dominica joined the Bolivarian Alternative for the Americas.

In 2025, the government of Dominica signed a free movement cooperation agreement along with Barbados, Belize, and Saint Vincent and the Grenadines allowing each other's nationals to have free movement between their nations just by presenting their passport and indicating the intention to become a full national with intention to work at time of entry.

=== Administrative divisions ===

Dominica is divided into 10 parishes.

Parish populations in Dominica (2011 census)
Parish	Population
Saint Andrew Parish	9,471
Saint David Parish	6,043
Saint George Parish	21,241
Saint John Parish	6,561
Saint Joseph Parish	5,637
Saint Luke Parish	1,668
Saint Mark Parish	1,834
Saint Patrick Parish	7,622
Saint Paul Parish	9,786
Saint Peter Parish	1,430

=== Territorial disputes ===
Dominica is engaged in a long-running dispute with Venezuela over Venezuela's territorial claims to the sea surrounding Isla de Aves (literally Bird Island, but in fact called 'Bird Rock' by Dominican authorities), a tiny islet located 140 mi (225 km) west of the island of Dominica.

During a visit to Venezuela, Dominica's Prime Minister Roosevelt Skerrit, in June 2006, stated, "Aves Island belongs to Venezuela.", unofficially ending the territorial claim.

=== Military ===
There has been no standing army in Dominica since 1981 when the Dominican Defence Force was disbanded following two violent coup attempts against Eugenia Charles.

The civil Commonwealth of Dominica Police Force includes a Special Service Unit and Coast Guard. In the event of war or other emergency, if proclaimed by the authorities, the Police Force shall be a military force which may be employed for State defence (Police Act, Chapter 14:01).

Dominica is a member of the Regional Security System (RSS).

=== LGBT rights ===
Both male and female same-sex sexual activity were criminalised in Dominica in the 19th century during the colonial era. In April 2024, Dominican attorney-at-law Cara Shillingford persuaded the High Court of Justice to overturn the laws banning same-sex activity since they violated LGBT individuals' constitutional rights.

== Economy ==
Exports of Dominica by product category (2019) Chemical products Transportation Machines Mineral products Plastics and rubbers Metals Foodstuffs Precious metals Textiles Instruments Animal products Vegetable products Paper goods Footwear and headwear Miscellaneous Stone and glass Wood products Animal and vegetable bi-products Animal hides Arts and antiques Weapons

Dominica's currency is the East Caribbean Dollar. In 2008, Dominica had one of the lowest per capita gross domestic product (GDP) rates of Eastern Caribbean states. The country nearly had a financial crisis in 2003 and 2004, but Dominica's economy grew by 3.5% in 2005 and 4.0% in 2006, following a decade of poor performance. Growth in 2006 was attributed to gains in tourism, construction, offshore and other services, and some sub-sectors of the banana industry. Around this time the International Monetary Fund (IMF) praised the Government of Dominica for its successful macroeconomic reforms, but also pointed out remaining challenges, including the need for further reductions in public debt, increased financial sector regulation, and market diversification.

Agriculture, especially bananas, once dominated Dominica's economy, and nearly one-third of the labour force worked in agriculture in the early 2000s. The sector, however, is highly vulnerable to weather conditions and to external events affecting commodity prices. In 2007, Hurricane Dean caused significant damage to the agricultural sector as well as the country's infrastructure, especially roads. In response to reduced European Union (EU) trade preferences for bananas from the former European colonies after the 2009 WTO decision, the government has diversified the agricultural sector by promoting the production of coffee, patchouli, aloe vera, cut flowers, and exotic fruits such as mango, guava and papaya, while the economy has become increasingly dependent on tourism.

The expected increase of Dominica's Citizenship by Investment (CBI) fees has been suspended with no implementation date in sight, as announced by Prime Minister Roosevelt Skerrit, in the 2016 budget speech.

=== International trade ===
Dominica is a beneficiary of the Caribbean Basin Initiative (CBI) that grants duty-free entry into the United States for many goods. Dominica also belongs to the predominantly English-speaking Caribbean Community (CARICOM), the CARICOM Single Market and Economy (CSME), and the Organisation of Eastern Caribbean States (OECS).

=== Financial services industry ===
Dominica is becoming in recent years a major international financial centre, including offshore banking, payment processing companies, and general corporate activities. Regulation and supervision of the financial services industry is the responsibility of the Financial Service Unit of the Commonwealth of Dominica (FSU) under the supervision of the Ministry of Finance. There are a number of service providers. These include global financial institutions including Scotiabank, Royal Bank of Canada, Cathedral Investment Bank, First Caribbean International Bank, and The Interoceanic Bank of the Caribbean.

Starting in the mid-late 1990s, offshore financial centres, such as Dominica, came under increasing pressure from the OECD for their allegedly harmful tax regimes, where the OECD wished to prevent low-tax regimes from having an advantage in the global marketplace. The OECD threatened to place Dominica and other financial centres on a "black list" and impose sanctions against them. Dominica successfully avoided being placed on the OECD black list by committing to regulatory reform to improve transparency and begin information exchange with OECD member countries about their citizens.

Dominica supposedly offers tax-free status to companies relocating from abroad. It is not known how many companies benefit from the tax-free status because of the strict confidentiality the government enforces, although it is known many Internet businesses and hedge funds utilise Dominica for this reason. On 12 July 2012 Dominica signed an agreement with Poland to exchange tax information.

=== Economic immigrants ===
Dominica offers an official and legally mandated economic citizenship to those seeking a valid second citizenship. The nationality law of Dominica authorises the government to waive the normal requirement of seven years of legal residence to acquire citizenship in exchange for an investment into their country's economy. The required contribution for a main applicant starts at US$100,000 through the Economic Diversification Fund. Alternatively, since 2014, applicants can make a US$200,000 minimum investment in pre-approved real estate from island exclusive resorts or global brands like Marriott, Kempinski or Hilton. According to officials, the citizenship by investment (CBI) programme was an economic and fiscal "lifeline" in the aftermaths of Tropical Storm Erika in 2015 and Hurricane Maria in 2017, and its new investment option had become the main source of Foreign Direct Investment into Dominica by early 2016. Dominican citizens can travel without a visa, or obtain a visa upon entry, to nearly 140 countries and territories, including the UK and the Schengen Zone. Applying for Dominican citizenship requires interacting with official Government Approved Economic Citizenship Agents as the first step in the application process. This programme is valued at 16% of the government's total revenue as of 2018.

The government's management of the economic citizenship programme and an initial perceived lack of transparency in the use of the revenues generated are a frequent topic of heated domestic political controversy. Referring to the opposition, prime minister Skerrit in 2016 stated, "If they can discredit the Citizenship by Investment Program and make Dominica an unattractive place to obtain citizenship, then revenues would fall and the government would not be able to rebuild the country. Or, the government would then have to increase taxes on the people; making itself unpopular in their sight." Since then, the Government of Dominica has improved transparency of CBI funds. According to prime minister Skerrit's 2018–2019 Budget Address, the island's CBI Programme has helped develop a national health insurance pilot that provides Dominican children in critical medical conditions with overseas treatment. Because many residents were displaced by Hurricane Maria's impact on the small Caribbean island, the government pledged to build 5,000 hurricane-proof homes, of which the first batch of 125 houses were scheduled for occupancy in February 2019. The CBI Programme has also significantly helped to develop and create jobs in the island's ecotourism sector. Furthermore, the Skerrit administration set aside EC$5m every month for the construction of a new airport.

The Financial Times's Professional Wealth Management publication ranked Dominica as the world's best citizenship-by-investment programme in its annual CBI Index. According to the report, investors choose Dominica's citizenship because it has the most affordable investment threshold and, while the security checks each applicant is subjected to remain very strict, the application process is straightforward and streamlined.

=== Tourism ===
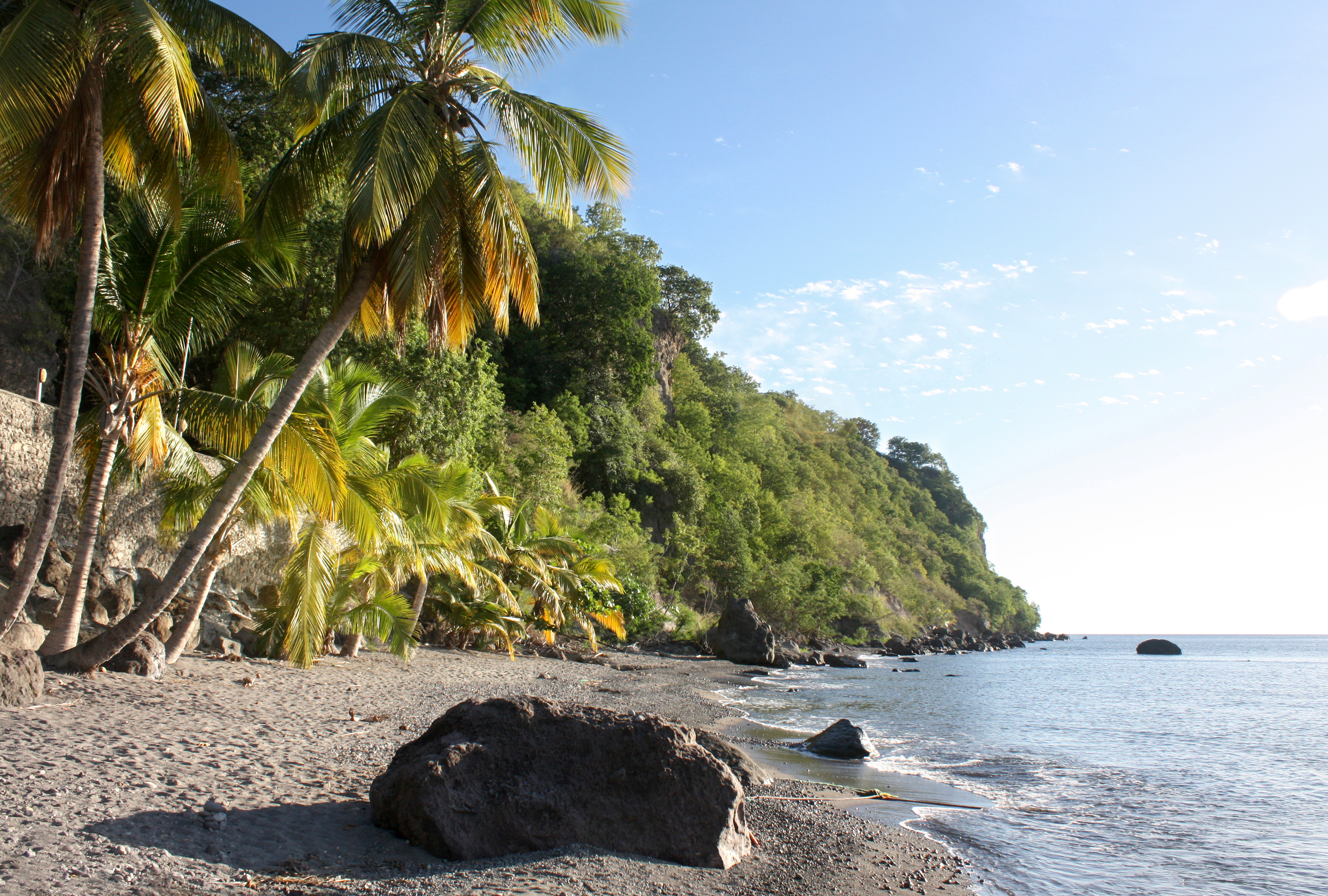
Batalie Bay, Dominica

Dominica is mostly volcanic and has few beaches, contributing to tourism developing more slowly than on neighbouring islands. Nevertheless, Dominica's mountains, rainforests, freshwater lakes, hot springs, waterfalls, and diving spots make it an attractive ecotourism destination. Cruise ship stopovers have increased following the development of modern docking and waterfront facilities in Roseau, the capital. Out of 22 Caribbean islands tracked, Dominica had the fewest visitors in 2008 (55,800 or 0.3% of the total). This was about half as many as visited Haiti. The volcanic nature of the island has attracted scuba divers.

=== Infrastructure ===
==== Air ====
There are two airports currently operating on the island. The primary airport, Douglas-Charles Airport (IATA airport code DOM), has direct flights from Miami and Newark. It is on the northeast coast and is about a 45-minute drive from Portsmouth (1 hour from Roseau). Douglas-Charles Airport is suitable for limited use of commercial jets because of runway length. A runway extension and service upgrade project began at Douglas-Charles Airport around 2006 and was finished in 2010. A second airport, Canefield Airport (DCF), is about 15 minutes from Roseau on the southwest coast. Canefield Airport primarily serves domestic, charter, and general aviation flights, complementing commercial operations at Douglas-Charles Airport. A third, Dominica International Airport, is currently under construction in Wesley and is expected to be completed in 2026.

==== Roads ====
Dominica's road network runs primarily along the coastline and along river valleys. Major roads are two-lane highways which connect the capital, Roseau, with Portsmouth (the Edward Oliver Leblanc Highway) and Douglas Charles Airport (the Dr Nicholas Liverpool Highway). It takes about 45 minutes to drive from Portsmouth to Roseau. These major roads were reconstructed from the early 2010s to 2015 with assistance from the People's Republic of China and the European Union. Private minibuses form the majority of the public transport system.

During Tropical Storm Erika in 2015, several road surfaces and bridges were damaged by flooding and landslides, including the just-completed Edward Oliver LeBlanc Highway (Roseau–Portsmouth) and Dr. Nicholas Liverpool Highway (Pont Cassé–Douglas Charles Airport). To alleviate this, the government announced that it intended to install emergency bridges in Roseau Valley near the Trafalgar Falls to Wotten Waven and in Emshall. Hurricane Maria of 2017 also damaged the road network.

==== Green energy ====
Dominica's electricity sector includes power from hydroelectricity, solar energy and geothermal energy. After the devastation caused by Hurricane Maria in September 2017, the Dominican government claimed it would invest in geothermal energy. In early March 2018, Dominica signed an International Solar Alliance framework agreement, in an attempt to exploit solar energy to power the country with a source of renewable energy. The government commissioned a geothermal power plant near Laudat in Roseau Valley in a public-private partnership with Ormat Technologies, with part of the funding coming from grants by various governments and non-governmental organisations. It is the second geothermal plant in the Caribbean region. The 10 MW plant entered commercial operations in 2026. In June 2026, it generated 43% of the electricity supply in Dominica, with a further 25% coming from hydropower. The geothermal plant is expected to generate 70% of Dominica's electricity by 2027.

== Demographics ==
Population and Annual Growth Rate
Year	Pop.	±% p.a.
1844	22,649	—
1871	27,178	+0.68%
1881	28,211	+0.37%
1891	26,841	−0.50%
1901	28,894	+0.74%
1911	33,863	+1.60%
1921	37,059	+0.91%
1946	47,624	+1.01%
1960	59,916	+1.65%
1970	69,549	+1.50%
1981	73,795	+0.54%
1991	71,183	−0.36%
2001	71,242	+0.01%
2011	69,325	−0.27%

As of Dominica’s 2011 official census, the island's population was 69,325. The UN's estimated population for 2026 is 65,511. The population growth of Dominica is very slow, due primarily to emigration to other countries.

=== Ethnicity ===
Most Dominicans are of African descent. There is a growing mixed population along with a small European-origin minority who are mostly descendants of French and British colonists and some people of Irish descent who were indentured servants. A small number of Lebanese, Syrians and East Asians also reside on the island. Dominica is the only eastern Caribbean island that still has a population of pre-Columbian native Kalinago (previously called Caribs), who were exterminated or driven from neighbouring islands. As of 2014 there are more than 3,000 Kalinago remaining, living in eight villages on the east coast of Dominica. This special Kalinago Territory (previously Carib Reserve) was granted by the British Crown in 1903.

=== Age ===
Dominica has a relatively large number of centenarians. In March 2007, there were 22 centenarians amongst the island's 70,000 inhabitants, three times the average incidence in developed countries. In September 2026, there were 15 centenarians on the island (11 women and 4 men). Dominica's high rate of centenarians was studied by researchers from Ross University School of Medicine in the early 2000s. The researchers pointed to reasons beyond just genetics to explain these long lives, including aerobic activity, nutrition, and social stimulation.

The island has an official "Centenarians Day" holiday, celebrated on September 23. The island also has a "Credit for Life" program, which provides registered centenarians with annual credits towards their electricity accounts.

=== Languages ===
Dominica is a member of both the English-speaking Commonwealth of Nations and the French-speaking La Francophonie.

English is the official language of Dominica, universally spoken and understood. It is the language of instruction in all schools.

Dominican Creole, also known as French Patois or Kwéyòl, is widely spoken. It is a form of Antillean Creole based on French It has its origins in French migration to the island starting in 1690, a majority French Creole-speaking population that resided on the island, and its location between the two French-speaking departments of Martinique and Guadeloupe. Since 1979, Dominica has been a member of La Francophonie. Dominican Creole is particularly used among the older generation, which also speaks a patois language. Because of a decline in the use of Creole by the younger generation, initiatives have begun to increase usage and promote this unique part of the nation's history and culture.

A dialect known as Kokoy (or Cockoy) is also spoken. It is a type of pidgin English which is a mix of Antiguan and Barbudan Creole and Dominican Creole, and is mainly spoken in the north-eastern villages of Marigot and Wesley, by the descendants of immigrants from Montserrat and Antigua. Dominica was partially integrated into the federal colony of the Leeward Islands in 1832. In 1871, Dominica became a full part of the Federation of the Leeward Islands. From the start it was a peculiar relationship, for previously Dominica had played no part in the political or cultural traditions of the other more Anglophone islands of the federation. As a Leeward Island, this much larger territory, with thousands of acres of forested unclaimed land, was open to the people of Montserrat and Antigua. At the beginning of the 20th century, the Rose's Company, which produced Rose's lime juice, saw demand for its product outgrow its ability to supply the product from Montserrat. Their response to the situation was to buy land in Dominica and encourage Montserrat farm labourers to relocate. As a result of these immigrations, Kokoy-speaking communities emerged in Dominica, specifically in Wesley and Marigot. Over time there has been much intermarrying, but there are still traces of difference in origin.

The Kalinago language, also known as Igneri (also Iñeri, Igñeri, Inyeri), was an Arawakan language historically spoken by the Kalinago of the Lesser Antilles in the Caribbean. The Kalinago lived throughout the southern Lesser Antilles such as Dominica, St Vincent and Trinidad, supposedly having conquered them from their previous inhabitants, the Igneri. Kalinago became extinct about 1920, but an offshoot survives as Garifuna, primarily in Central America.

=== Refugees ===
In 1902, on 8 May, the Mount Pelée volcano on Martinique erupted destroying the city of Saint-Pierre. Refugees from Martinique arrived in boats to the southern villages of Dominica and some remained permanently on the island.

During World War II, refugees came to Dominica from Martinique and Guadeloupe seeking escape from persecution and poor living conditions. This included refugees of African and Jewish descent fleeing antisemitism and racism under the pro-Nazi Vichy regime. It included refugees leaving the islands due to food shortages and lack of employment under the regime. It included French war refugees and freedom fighters coming to Dominica to join Free French Forces.

=== Religion ===
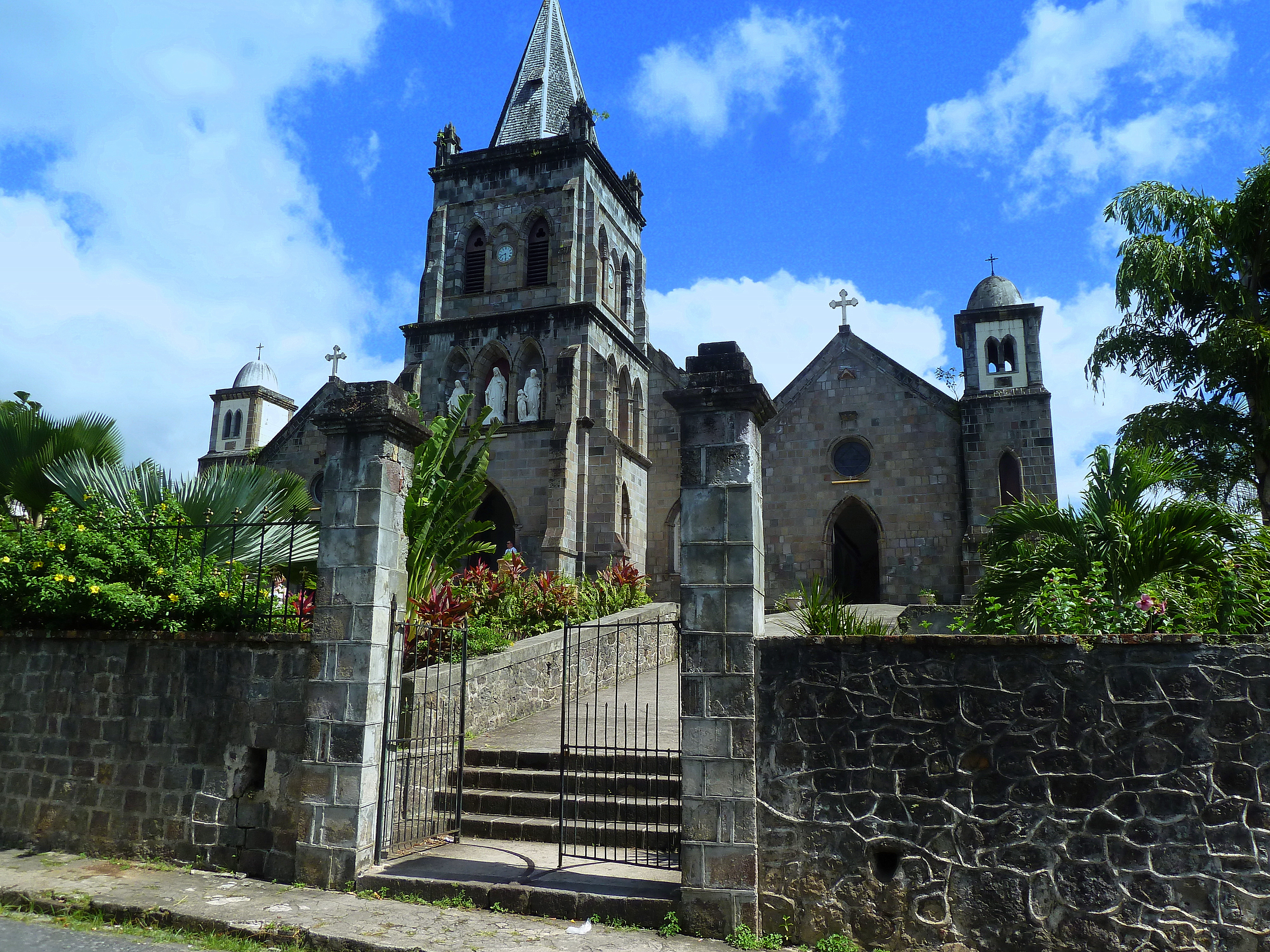
Roseau Cathedral in Dominica

61.4% of the population is Catholic, though in recent years a number of Protestant churches have been established. About 10–12% of the population belongs to one of the Seventh-day Adventist denominations, which includes Yahweh Congregation, Church of God (Seventh-Day), and the Seventh-day Adventist Church.

According to the Association of Religion Data Archives, in 2010 the World Christian Database reported that the largest non-Christian religious groups included: spiritualism followed by 2.6% of the population; Baháʼí followed by 1.7%; Buddhism, Hinduism, and Islam, each followed by 0.1%; and Chinese folk religion and Neoreligions were followed each one by a <0.1% of the population.

Non-believers (atheists and agnostics) are 6.1% of the population.

The second largest town on the island, Portsmouth, is home to Al-Ansaar Masjid, the first mosque to be built in Dominica. The mosque was constructed with the help of Muslim students from the since-relocated Ross University School of Medicine.

=== Education ===
Schooling in Dominica is mandatory up to secondary school. After pre-school, students attend primary school for six or seven years, and are admitted into secondary school on the basis of a Common Entrance Exam. After five years students take the Caribbean Secondary Education Certificate administered by the Caribbean Examination Council (a 15-member confederation of the Caribbean community (CARICOM)). The more advanced version of this examination, CAPE, can be taken upon completion of two years of community college. The island has its own Dominica State College, formerly named Clifton Dupigny Community College. Some Dominicans attend universities in Cuba on scholarships offered by its government; others go to the University of the West Indies or to universities in the UK, US or other countries.

Archbold Tropical Research and Education Center is a biological field station owned by Clemson University and is located at Springfield Estate between Canefield and Pont Cassé. In 2006 All Saints University School of Medicine opened in temporary facilities in Loubière, it was later located in Roseau, Dominica. A marine biology institute in Mahaut, the Institute for Tropical Marine Ecology, closed in 2009.

Ross University School of Medicine was located at Portsmouth. Ross had been operating in Dominica since the 1980s. Previously, a thousand medical students arrived each year from the US and Canada to study at Ross University, but the campus was permanently relocated to Barbados at the beginning of the 2019 Spring semester due to extensive hurricane damage suffered at the Dominican campus.

The Dominica Library and Information Service (DLIS) serves an integral role in the education of its citizens, provides service for the population of Dominica through three components: public library services, documentation and research services, and archival services. The institution was established in 1843 with the opening of reading rooms, the first public library in Dominica, Victoria Memorial. What began as a reading room evolved into public library that wasn't fully free: patrons were required to pay a subscription fee. Surviving religious and political discord, the Great Depression, and two world wars, the library finally came under the care of the government where funds were set aside for its upkeep. It is managed by the Ministry of Education and Human Resource Development. Ironically, the early stages of the library's history were dedicated to remove the "uncouth", and "barbarous patois", which is being preserved. However, it did achieve its goal of "diminishing the island's very high percentage of illiteracy". The historical library was demolished in the wake of Hurricane Maria in 2018 and is slated to be rebuilt with a more modern outlook.

== Culture ==
Dominica's east coast Carib Territory

Dominica was historically occupied by the Arawaks (Tainos) and Carib (Kalinago) tribes at the time European settlers reached the island. "Massacre" is a name of a river dedicated to the mass murder of the native villagers by English settlers on St. Kitts. The survivors were forced into exile on Dominica. Both the French and British claimed the island and imported slaves from Africa for labour. The remaining Kalinago live on a 3,700-acre (15 km^{2}) territory on the east coast of the island. They elect their own chief. This has produced the modern cultural mix.

Music and dance are important facets of Dominican culture. The annual independence celebrations display a variety of traditional song and dance. Since 1997, there have also been weeks of Creole festivals, such as "Creole in the Park" and the "World Creole Music Festival".

Dominica gained prominence on the international music stage in 1973, when Gordon Henderson founded the group Exile One and an original musical genre, which he called "Cadence-lypso" was born. This paved the way for modern Creole music. Other musical genres include "Jing ping" and "Cadence". Jing ping features the accordion and is native to the island. Dominica's music is a mélange of Haitian, Afro-Cuban, African and European traditions. Popular artists over the years included Chubby and the Midnight Groovers, Bells Combo, The Gaylords, WCK, and Triple Kay.

The 11th annual World Creole Music Festival was held in 2007, part of the island's celebration of independence from Great Britain on 3 November. A year-long reunion celebration began in January 2008, marking 30 years of independence.

Dominica is often seen as a society that is migrating from collectivism to individualism. The economy is a developing one that previously depended on agriculture. Signs of collectivism are evident in the small towns and villages which are spread across the island.

The novelist Jean Rhys was born and raised in Dominica. The island is obliquely depicted in her best-known book, Wide Sargasso Sea. Rhys's friend, the political activist and writer Phyllis Shand Allfrey, set her 1954 novel, The Orchid House, in Dominica.

Much of the Walt Disney film Pirates of the Caribbean: Dead Man's Chest (the second in the series, released in 2006), was shot on location on Dominica (though in the film it was known as "Pelegosto", a fictional island), along with some shooting for the third film in the series, At World's End (2007).

=== Media ===
Dominica has two major newspapers, The Sun and The Chronicle, and two national television stations. Radio stations include the Dominica Broadcasting Corporation and independent stations come and go. Digicel and FLOW operate mobile phone services on the island for the use of Dominica's wireless customers. Historical newspapers include The Dominican, The Dominica Guardian, and the Dominica Colonist, available for free in the Digital Library of the Caribbean.

=== Cuisine ===
Dominica's cuisine is similar to that of other Caribbean islands, particularly Jamaica, Saint Lucia, and Trinidad and Tobago. Like other Commonwealth Caribbean islands, Dominicans have developed a distinct twist to their cuisine. Breakfast is an important daily meal, typically including saltfish, dried and salted codfish, and "bakes" (fried dough). Saltfish and bakes are combined for a fast food snack that can be eaten throughout the day; vendors on Dominica's streets sell these snacks to passersby, together with fried chicken, fish and fruit and yogurt "smoothies". Other breakfast meals include cornmeal porridge, which is made with fine cornmeal or polenta, milk or condensed milk, and sugar to sweeten. Traditional British-influenced dishes, such as eggs and toast, are also popular, as are fried fish and plantains.

Common vegetables include plantains, tannias (a root vegetable), sweet potatoes, potatoes, rice and peas. Meat and poultry typically eaten include chicken, beef and fish. These are often prepared in stews with onions, carrots, garlic, ginger and herbs. The vegetables and meat are browned to create a rich dark sauce. Popular meals include rice and peas, brown stew chicken, stew beef, fried and stewed fish, and many different types of hearty fish broths and soups. These are filled with dumplings, carrots and ground provisions.

=== Sports ===
Cricket is a popular sport on the island, and Dominica competes in test cricket as part of the West Indies cricket team. In West Indies domestic first-class cricket, Dominica participates as part of the Windward Islands cricket team, although they are often considered a part of the Leeward Islands geographically. This is due to being part of the British Windward Islands colony from 1940 until independence; its cricket federation remains a part of the Windward Islands Cricket Board of Control.

On 24 October 2007, the 8,000-seat Windsor cricket stadium was completed with a donation of EC$33 million (US$17 million, €12 million) from the government of the People's Republic of China.

Netball, basketball, rugby, tennis and association football are gaining popularity.

International footballer Julian Wade, Dominica's all-time top goal scorer as of 2021, plays for Brechin City F.C. in Scotland.

During the 2014 Winter Olympics, a husband and wife team of Gary di Silvestri and Angela Morrone di Silvestri spent US$175,000 to register as Dominican citizens and enter the 15 km men's and 10 km women's cross-country skiing events, respectively. Angela did not start her race, and Gary pulled out several hundred meters into his race. As of 2022, they are Dominica's only Winter Olympic athletes.

Athlete Jérôme Romain won the bronze medal at the 1995 World Championships in Athletics triple jump competition. He also qualified for the finals at the 1996 Olympic Games; even though he had to pull out due to injury, until 2024 his 12th position was the best ever performance of a Dominican at the Olympics.

Sprinter Olympian Chris Lloyd won the bronze medal at the 2007 Pan American Games over 400m.

Triple Jump Olympian Thea LaFond became the first athlete to win a medal at the 2018 Commonwealth Games and an Olympic medal, earning gold at the 2024 Summer Olympics.

== Notable people ==
- Phyllis Shand Allfrey, writer, newspaper editor, activist, and politician
- Chelsea Connor, biologist, activist and birdwatcher
- Exile One, musicians
- Lennox Honychurch, historian and politician
- Jerelle Joseph, scientist and academic
- Thea LaFond, athlete
- Chris Lloyd, athlete
- Philip Potter, religious leader
- Jean Rhys, writer
- Jérôme Romain, athlete
- Edward Scobie, Dominican-born journalist, magazine publisher, politician and historian
- A. C. Shillingford, businessman
- Julian Wade, footballer
- Henry Wilcoxon, actor
- Asquith Xavier, Dominican-born Briton who ended a colour bar at British Railways in London in the 1960

== See also ==
- List of people from Dominica
- Outline of Dominica
