= Sylvanie Burton =

President of Dominica since 2023

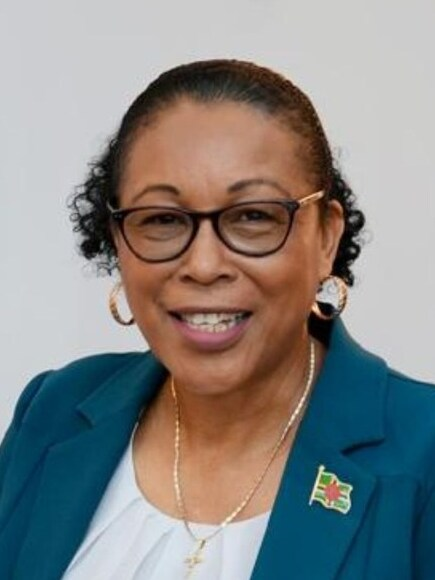
- Burton in 2025

9th President of Dominica
- Incumbent
- Assumed office 2 October 2023
- Prime Minister: Roosevelt Skerrit
- Preceded by: Charles Savarin

Personal details
- Born: 1964 or 1965 (age 61–62) OR 1956 (age 69–70) Salybia, Kalinago Territory, Dominica
- Party: Dominica Labour Party

External image
- Sylvanie Burton with the Pan-Commonwealth Forum on Sustainable Energy, 3–4 June 2019, London

Sylvanie Burton (born 1956?) is a Dominican politician who has served as the president of Dominica since 2023, after being elected in the 2023 Dominican presidential election. She is the first woman and first Indigenous (Kalinago) president of Dominica.

== Early life ==
Sylvanie Burton was born in the village of Crayfish River. She is a member of the Kalinago people. She holds a bachelor's degree in rural development and a master's degree in project management.

== Career ==
Brown has served as a justice of the peace and village council clerk.

Burton has served as permanent secretary in various ministries since 2014, within the ministries of Community Development, Environment, Rural Modernization, Kalinago Upliftment, and Constituency Empowerment, Foreign Affairs, Trade, Youth and Social Services. Burton has also previously held the position of Development Officer in the Ministry of Kalinago Affairs.

Burton was nominated by the DLP government led by Roosevelt Skerrit to succeed outgoing president Charles Savarin. Her nomination was rejected by the leader of the opposition, Jesma Paul Victor, leading to an election within parliament against the opposition's nominee.

Burton's first overseas trip as president was to Guadeloupe in December 2023.

== Personal life ==
Burton is a member of the Catholic Church. She married Gilbert Burton, with whom she had two children. She was 58 years old in August 2023 or born in 1956. She has a master's degree in project management from the University of Manchester, England, and a bachelor's degree in rural development from the St. Francis Xavier University, Canada.

Political offices
Preceded by Charles Savarin	President of Dominica; 2023–present	Incumbent
