= Worrel Sanford =

Dominican politician

Worrel Sanford is a Dominican politician and medical doctor.

== Biography ==
Worrel Sanford is Kalinago. He is a Cuban-trained dermatologist. He is married and has a son.

In the 1990 general election, Sanford was elected to represent the Salybia constituency in the House of Assembly, which contains the Kalinago Territory. He ran on the Dominica Labour Party (DLP) ticket. He resigned from office in 1993. He was succeeded in a December 1993 by-election by Francois Barrie.

Sanford left the DLP. By March 2019, it was speculated that Worrel Sanford would contest the Salybia constituency again with the opposition United Workers' Party (UWP). He announced his candidacy with the UWP in April 2019. On 16 August, Sanford withdrew his candidacy. He cited family matters as the reason for the decision. The UWP selected Anette Sanford to replace him as candidate. Worrel Sanford endorsed her candidacy. Anette Sanford was defeated in the 2019 general election by DLP candidate Cozier Frederick.
