= Claudius Sanford =

Dominican politician

Claudius Sanford (born 1974) is a Dominican politician in the United Workers' Party. He served in the House of Assembly of Dominica as an Opposition Senator from 2005 to 2009, and from August 2010 to October 2011.

Sanford is of Kalinago heritage and a resident of the Carib Territory. He earned a teaching certificate from the University of the West Indies. He also taught economics at the Dominica State College. He is married to Anette Sanford.

Sanford was appointed an Opposition Senator in the House of Assembly in 2005. He contested the Salybia constituency on the UWP ticket in the 2009 general election. He lost to Ashton Graneau of the Labour Party on 18 December 2009, with 684 votes to Graneau's 1,013 (59.6% to 40.2%). He was again appointed to serve as a Senator by the Opposition Leader Hector John on 5 August 2010. Sanford resigned his seat to pursue a master's degree overseas, and was replaced by Danny Lugay on October 25, 2011.
