= Kalinago =

Group of people who live in Venezuela and the Lesser Antilles

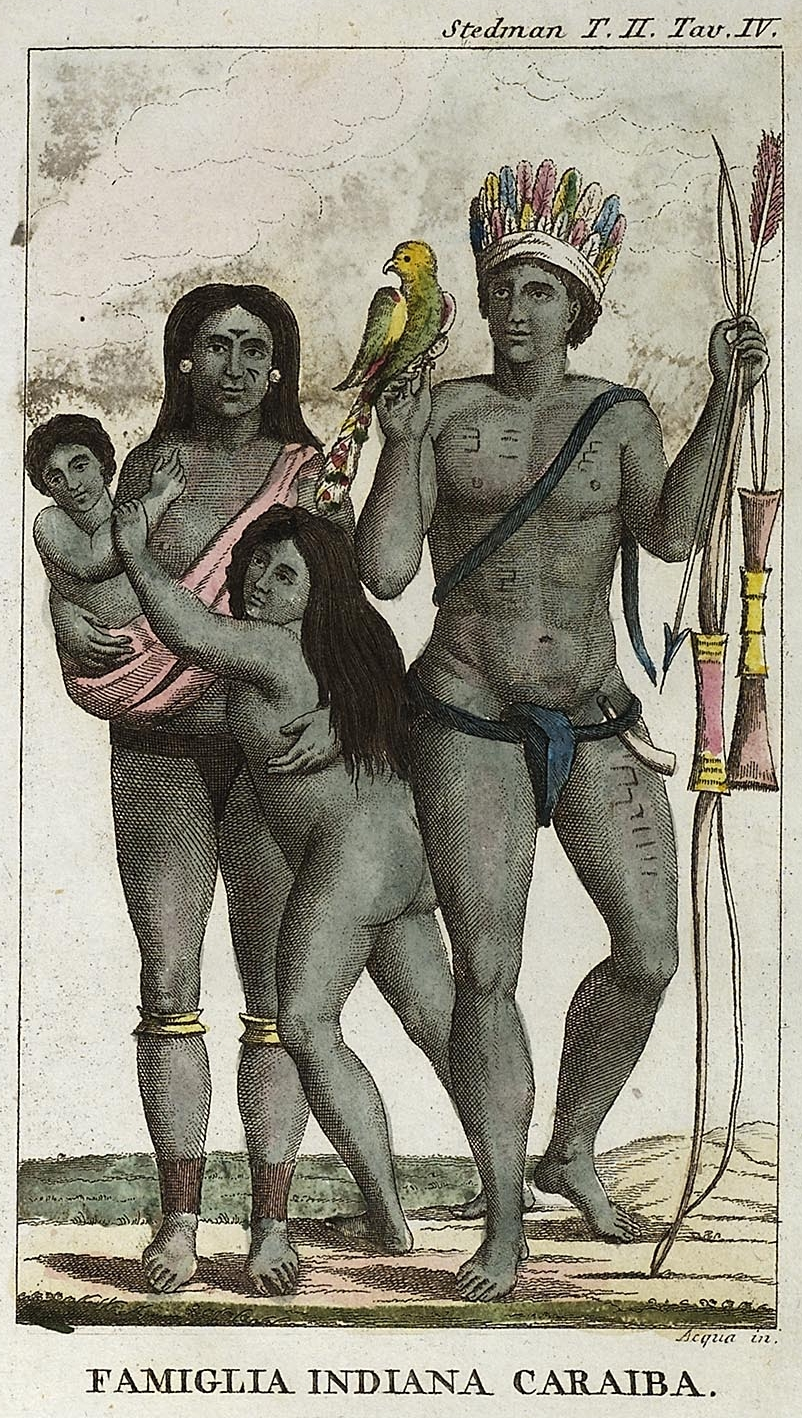
- Carib family (by John Gabriel Stedman 1818)

Total population
- Dominica: 3,000; Saint Vincent and the Grenadines: 3,000; Saint Lucia: Small number

Regions with significant populations
- Dominica, Saint Lucia, Saint Vincent and the Grenadines, formerly throughout the Lesser Antilles

Languages
- English, Dominican Creole French, formerly Kalinago

Religion
- Christianity, Indigenous religion

Related ethnic groups
- Garifuna (Black Carib), Taíno

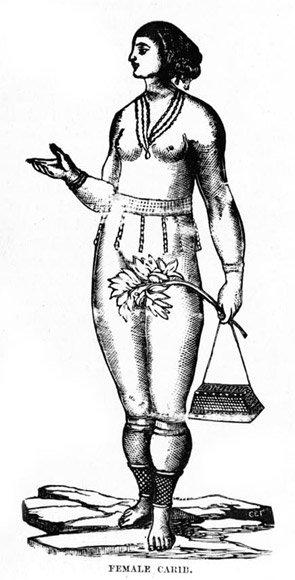
Drawing of a Carib woman (1888)

The Kalinago, also known as the Island Caribs or simply Caribs, are an Indigenous people of the Lesser Antilles in the Caribbean. They may have been related to the mainland Caribs or Kalina of South America, but they spoke an unrelated language known as Kalinago or Island Carib. They also spoke a pidgin language associated with the Kalina. While various Indigenous peoples of the Lesser Antilles are sometimes referred to as "Kalinago" because that is the preferred terminology of certain Indigenous communities in Dominica and Saint Vincent and the Grenadines, it may not be accurate to refer to all of the Indigenous peoples of the Lesser Antilles throughout history as "Kalinago".

At the time of Spanish contact, the Kalinago were one of the dominant groups in the Caribbean (the name of which is derived from "Carib", as the Kalinago were once called by Europeans). They lived throughout the Windward Islands, Dominica, and southern Leeward Islands, including Guadeloupe, and possibly Barbados. Historically, it was thought their ancestors were mainland peoples who had conquered the islands from their previous inhabitants, the Igneri. However, linguistic and archaeological evidence contradicts the notion of a mass emigration and conquest; the Kalinago language appears not to have been Cariban but like that of their neighbours, the Taíno. Irving Rouse and others suggest that a smaller group of mainland peoples migrated to the islands without displacing their inhabitants, eventually adopting the local language but retaining their traditions of a South American origin.

Recent archaeological research in Grenada has further refined this understanding, suggesting that the "Island Caribs" of the historic period may have been composed of two distinct groups: the "Caraïbe" (likely the long-term Indigenous inhabitants who produced Suazan Troumassoid pottery) and the "Galibis" (newer arrivals from the mainland who produced Cayo pottery).

In the early colonial period, the Kalinago had a reputation as warriors who raided neighbouring islands. According to the tales of Spanish conquistadors, the Kalinago were cannibals who regularly ate roasted human flesh. There is no hard evidence of the Kalinago eating human flesh, though one historian points out it might have been seldomly done as means of taunting or even frightening their Arawak enemies. The Kalinago and their descendants continue to live in the Antilles, notably on Dominica. The Garifuna, who share common ancestry with the Kalinago, also live principally in Central America.

== Name ==
The exonym Caribe was first recorded by Christopher Columbus. One hypothesis for the origin of Carib is that it means "brave warrior". Its variants, including the English word Carib, were then adopted by other European languages. Early Spanish explorers and administrators used the terms Arawak and Caribs to distinguish the peoples of the Caribbean, with Carib reserved for Indigenous groups that they considered hostile and Arawak for groups that they considered friendly.

The Kalinago language endonyms are Karifuna (singular) and Kalinago (plural). The name was officially changed from "Carib" to "Kalinago" in Dominica in 2015.

== History ==
William F. Keegan and Corinne L. Hofman have outlined two major models for the origin of the Kalinago. The traditional account, which is almost as old as Columbus, says that the Caribs were a warlike people who were moving up the Lesser Antilles and displacing the original inhabitants. Early missionary texts suggested the original inhabitants of the islands were the Igneri, while the Kalinago were invaders originating in South America (home to the mainland Caribs or Kalina) who conquered and displaced the Igneri. As this tradition was widespread in oral testimonies, and internally consistent, it was accepted as historical by Europeans.

Another model proposes that the Kalinago developed out of the Indigenous peoples of the Antilles. While the Caribs were commonly thought to have migrated from the Orinoco River area in South America to settle in the Caribbean islands around 1200 CE, an analysis of ancient DNA suggests that the Caribs had a common origin with contemporary groups in the Antilles. In this model, the transition from Igneri to Island Carib culture is theorised to have occurred around 1450.

Recent evidence from the Windward Islands supports a model of integration rather than displacement. In 1649, the French in Grenada distinguished between two groups: Caraïbes and Galibis. Archaeological findings link the Caraïbes to the Indigenous Suazan Troumassoid pottery tradition (developed in situ from earlier Saladoid populations) and the Galibis to the Cayo pottery tradition (derived from the mainland Koriabo complex). This suggests that the historic Kalinago or Island Carib identity was a political alliance or fusion of these two distinct groups, rather than a monolithic invasion.

=== Archaeological evidence ===
Archaeological evidence in support of the invasion model is sparse, with "no confirmed Carib sites [known] prior to the 1990s". However, Cayo-style pottery found in the Lesser Antilles and dated between AD 1000 and 1500 is similar to the Koriabo complex from which the mainland Carib or Kari'na pottery tradition is descended. Cayo pottery was once thought to have preceded Suazoid pottery (associated with the Igneri) in the Lesser Antilles, but more recent scholarship suggests that Cayo pottery gradually replaced Suazoid pottery in the islands. Cayo-style pottery has been found in the Lesser Antilles from Grenada to Basse-Terre and possibly Saint Kitts. Cayo pottery also shows similarities to the Meillacoid and Chicoid styles of the Greater Antilles, as well as to the South American Koriabo style.

In Grenada and Saint Vincent, radiocarbon dating indicates that Cayo pottery arrived around AD 1250, co-occurring with Suazan Troumassoid pottery until the historic period. The shift to the Troumassan and later Suazan ceramic styles (often associated with the rise of "Carib" culture) occurred during a period of regional drought (c. AD 730–900). Contrary to expectations of collapse, populations in the Windward Islands expanded during this time, likely due to an influx of Arauquinoid migrants from the mainland who integrated with local populations. This influx likely contributed to the development of the Suazan tradition, which persisted until European contact. Furthermore, settlement pattern analysis using the ideal free distribution model suggests that northern islands were settled earlier than southern ones like Grenada, supporting a "Southward Route" hypothesis for the initial colonisation of the Antilles, and contradicting the idea of the Windward Islands being the primary "stepping stones" from South America.

=== Arrival of Columbus ===
Upon his arrival in the Caribbean archipelago in 1492, the Maipurean-speaking Taínos reportedly told Christopher Columbus that Caribs were fierce warriors and cannibals who made frequent raids on the Taínos, often capturing women. According to Columbus, the Taínos said the Caribs had spent the last two centuries displacing the Taínos by warfare, extermination, and assimilation.

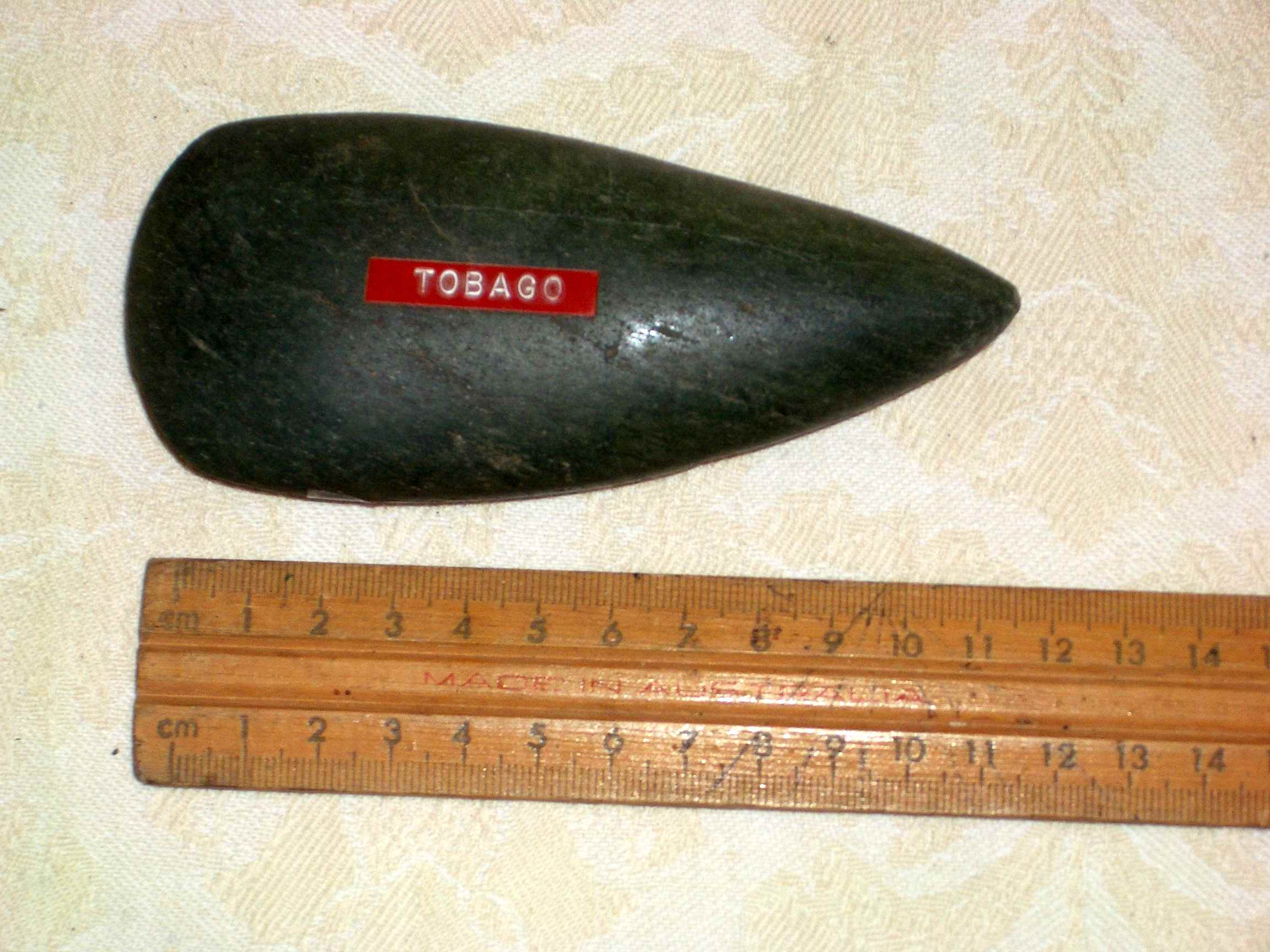
Greenstone ceremonial axe. From shell midden, Mt Irvine Bay, Tobago, 1957.

French missionary Raymond Breton arrived in the Lesser Antilles in 1635 and lived in Guadeloupe and Dominica until 1653. He took ethnographic and linguistic notes on the native peoples of these islands, including Saint Vincent, which he visited briefly. Breton was responsible for many of the early stereotypes about Kalinago. Other missionaries, such as Cesar de Rochefort, would refute the common conception of the Caribs as cannibals.

Later, the Kalinago occasionally allied with the Taínos to repel European invaders. When the Spanish attempted to colonise Puerto Rico, Kalinago from Saint Croix arrived to aid the local Taíno. Daguao village, initially slated to be the Europeans' capital, was destroyed by Taínos from the eastern area of Puerto Rico, with the support of Kalinago from neighbouring Vieques. By the middle of the 16th century, the resistance of Taínos and Kalinago alike was largely quashed across the Greater Antilles. The survivors were enslaved to work in agriculture or mining.

The Kalinagos were more successful in repelling the Spanish—and later the French and English—in the Lesser Antilles, retaining their independence. The lack of gold in the area and the large numbers of casualties inflicted upon the Spanish contributed to their survival.

=== Resistance to the English and the French ===
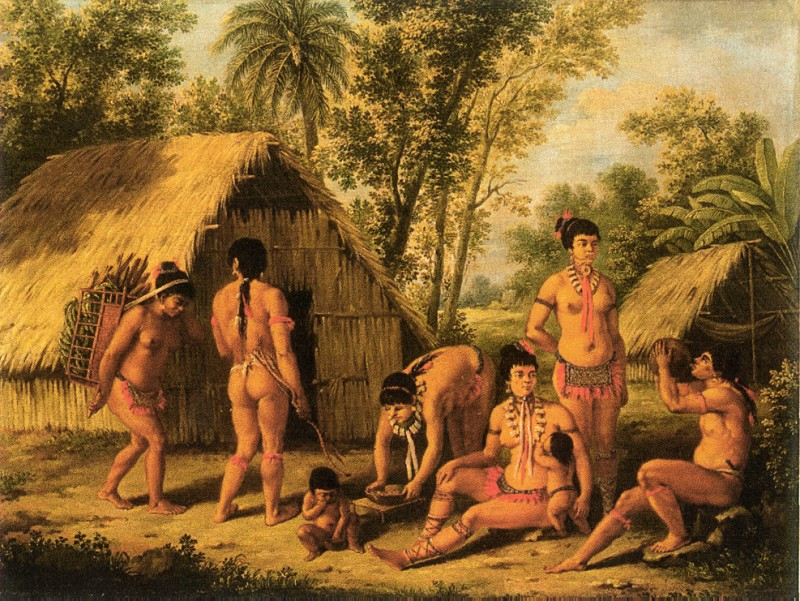
A Family of Carib natives drawn from life, by Agostino Brunias, c. 1765 – 1770s

In the 17th century, the Kalinago regularly attacked the plantations of the English and the French in the Leeward Islands. In the 1630s, planters from the Leewards conducted campaigns against the Kalinago but with limited success. The Kalinago took advantage of divisions between the Europeans, to provide support to the French and the Dutch during wars in the 1650s, consolidating their independence as a result. Such wars led to a geopolitical boundary separating the Lesser Antilles, inhabited by the Kalinago, from the Greater Antilles, inhabited by the Taíno. This boundary became known as the "poison arrow curtain".

In 1660, France and England signed the Treaty of Saint Charles with Island Caribs. It stipulated that the Kalinago would evacuate all the Lesser Antilles except for Dominica and Saint Vincent, which were recognised as reserves. However, the English ignored the treaty and campaigned against the Kalinago in succeeding decades.

By 1763, the British had annexed Saint Lucia, Tobago, Dominica and Saint Vincent. On Saint Vincent the Kalinago intermarried with free West African captives willingly, forming the 'Black Caribs' or Garifuna who were expelled to Honduras in 1797. The British colonial use of the term Black Carib, particularly in William Young's Account of the Black Charaibs (1795), has been described in modern historiography as framing the majority of the indigenous Saint Vincent population as "mere interlopers from Africa" who lacked claims to land possession in Saint Vincent.

== Present ==
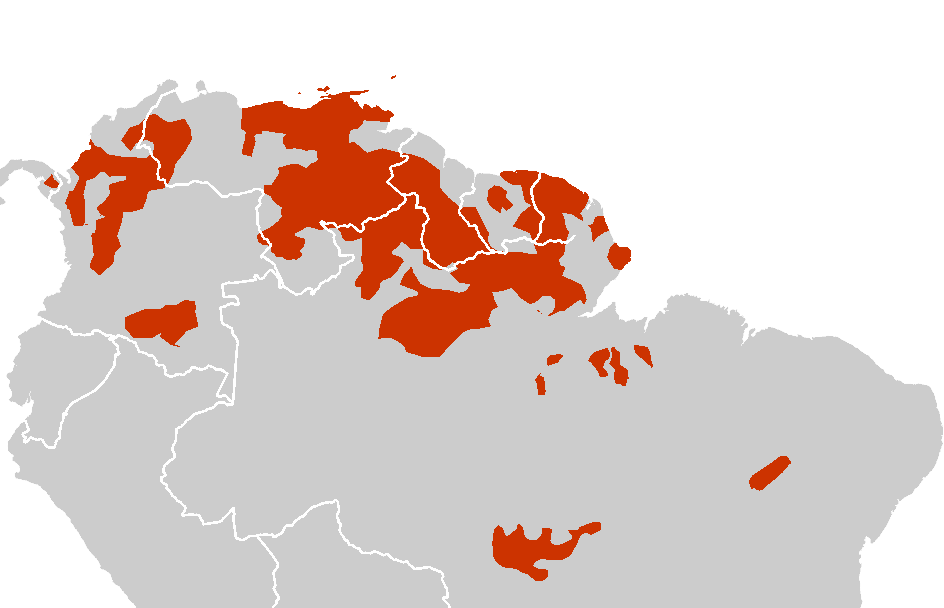
Distribution of Cariban languages in South America

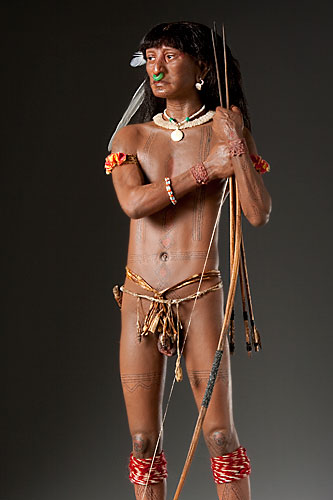
Carib Warrior (mixed media wax sculpture by artist George S. Stuart)

As of 2008, a small population of around 3,400 Kalinago survived in the Kalinago Territory in northeast Dominica, of whom some 70 "defined themselves as 'pure'". The Kalinago of Dominica maintained their independence for many years by taking advantage of the island's rugged terrain. The island's east coast includes a 3,700-acre (15 km^{2}) territory formerly known as the Carib Territory that was granted to the people by the British government in 1903. The Dominican Kalinago elect their own chief. In 2014 Charles Williams was elected Kalinago chief, succeeding Garnette Joseph.

During the beginning of the 18th century, the Island Carib population in Saint Vincent was greater than that in Dominica. Both the Island Caribs (Yellow Caribs) and the Black Caribs (Garifuna) fought against the British during the Second Carib War. After the end of the war, the British deported the Garifuna (a population of 4,338) to Roatan, while the Island Caribs (whose population consisted of 80 people) were allowed to stay on Saint Vincent. The 1812 eruption of La Soufrière destroyed the Carib territory, killing a majority of the Island Caribs. After the eruption, 130 Yellow Caribs and 59 Black Caribs survived on Saint Vincent. Unable to recover from the damage caused by the eruption, 120 of the Yellow Caribs, under Captain Baptiste, emigrated to Trinidad. In 1830, the Carib population numbered less than 100.

== Culture and society ==
=== Canoes ===
Canoes are a significant aspect of the Kalinago's material culture and economy. They are used for transport from the southern continent and islands of the Caribbean, as well as providing them with the ability to fish more efficiently and to grow their fishing industry. Canoes, constructed from the Burseraceae, Cedrela odorata, Ceiba pentandra, and Hymenaea courbaril trees, serve different purposes depending on their height and thickness of the bark. The Ceiba pentandra tree is not only functional but spiritual and believed to house spirits that would become angered if disturbed. Canoes have been used throughout the history of the Kalinago and have become a renewed interest within the manufacturing of traditional dugout canoes used for inter-island transportation and fishing.

In 1997 Dominica Carib artist Jacob Frederick and Tortola artist Aragorn Dick Read set out to build a traditional canoe based on the fishing canoes still used in Dominica, Guadeloupe and Martinique. They launched a voyage by canoe to the Orinoco delta to meet up with the local Kalinago tribes, re-establishing cultural connections with the remaining Kalinago communities along the island chain, documented by the BBC in The Quest of the Carib Canoe.

=== Language ===
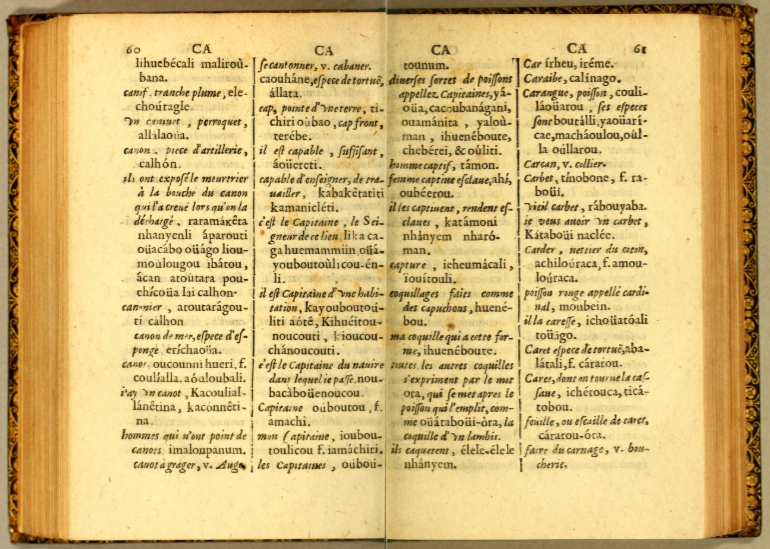
The term Calínago in Breton's Dictionaire francois-caraibe, 1666.

Historically, scholars assumed that Island Carib men and women spoke different languages. To explain this phenomenon, scholars proposed that the Island Caribs may have killed the men and kept the women, allowing the Igneri language to survive among women. This assumption arose from the fact that by at least the early 17th century, Carib men spoke a Cariban-based pidgin language in addition to the usual Arawakan language used by both sexes. This was similar to pidgins used by mainland Caribs when communicating with their Arawak neighbours. Berend J. Hoff and Douglas Taylor hypothesised that it dated to the time of the Carib expansion through the islands, and that males maintained it to emphasise their origins on the mainland.

Linguistic analysis in the 20th century determined that the main Island Carib language was spoken by both sexes, and was Arawakan, not Cariban. Scholars adopted more nuanced theories to explain the transition from the earlier Igneri to the later Island Carib societies in the Antilles. Irving Rouse proposed that a relatively small scale Carib force conquered but did not displace the Igneri, and the invaders eventually took on the Igneri language while still maintaining their identity as Caribs. Other scholars such as Sued Badillo doubt there was an invasion at all, proposing that the Igneri adopted the "Carib" identity over time due to their close economic and political relations with the rising mainland Carib polity. Both theories accept that the historical Island Carib language developed from the existing tongue of the islands, and thus it is also known as Igneri.

=== Medicine ===
By the early 21st century, a combination of bush medicine and modern medicine was used by the Kalinago of Dominica. For example, various fruits and leaves are used to heal common ailments. For a sprain, oils from coconuts, snakes, and bay leaves are used to heal the injury. Formerly the Caribs used an extensive range of medicinal plant and animal products.

=== Religion ===
The Caribs are believed to have practiced polytheism. As the Spanish began to colonise the Caribbean area, they wanted to convert the natives to Catholicism. The Caribs destroyed a church of Franciscans in Aguada, Puerto Rico and killed five of its members in 1579.

=== Cuisine ===
The Kalinago's cuisine is influenced by their location and the seasonal availability of ingredients. The Kalinago diet consists mainly of fish, complemented by meat, greens, root vegetables, and local herbs and spices. In contemporary Kalinago cuisine, fish is the preferred choice, followed by both domestic and imported meats, with wildlife such as crabs, crayfish, manicou, and agouti being less common. Other specialties include bwigo, chaloup, viyo, and chatou water, which are regarded as energy boosters. A traditional breakfast typically features vizou kann (cane juice) paired with cocoa and cinnamon, along with lêt koko (cocoa nut milk), roast plantains, or breadfruit served with roast meat or pweson boukanne accompanied by hot pepper and shieve. For lunch, a dish of sòs koko (cocoa nut cream) is served with pweson boukanné, seasoned with local herbs and spices, colored with roucou, and accompanied by a good ton ton and hot pepper. The quickest and most popular meal is the one pot, which includes root vegetables like dasheen, yams, tannia, and green bananas, along with fresh fish or smoked meat cooked in coconut cream, seasoned with local herbs and spices, and a touch of hot pepper. While herbal teas remain common among the Kalinago, they are slowly being supplanted by canned chocolate and milk.

== Representation ==
=== Cannibalism ===
Early European accounts describe the taking of human trophies and the ritual cannibalism of war captives among both Arawak and other Amerindian groups such as the Carib and Tupinambá, though the exact accuracy of cannibalistic reports still remains debated without skeletal evidence to support it. Scholars such as Hilary McD. Beckles have instead suggested that the stories of "vicious cannibals" may have comprised an "ideological campaign" against the Kalinago to justify "genocidal military expeditions" by European colonisers.

The Island Carib word karibna meant "person", although it became the origin of the English word "cannibal" after Columbus shared stories of flesh-eating Kalinago, apparently heard from their historic Taíno enemies. Among the Caribs, karibna was apparently associated with ritual eating of war enemies.

The Caribs reportedly had a tradition of keeping bones of their ancestors in their houses. Missionaries such as Père Jean Baptiste Labat and Cesar de Rochefort, described the practice as part of a belief that the ancestral spirits would always look after the bones and protect their descendants. The Caribs have been described by their various enemies as vicious and violent raiders. Rochefort stated they did not practice cannibalism.

During his third voyage to North America in 1528, after exploring Florida, the Bahamas, and the Lesser Antilles, Italian explorer Giovanni da Verrazzano was killed and allegedly eaten by Carib natives on what is now Guadeloupe, near a place called Karukera ("island of beautiful waters"). Historian William Riviere has described most of the cannibalism as related to war rituals.

=== Carib resistance ===
Chief Kairouane and his men from Grenada jumped off the "Leapers Hill" rather than face slavery under the French invaders, serving as an iconic representation of the Island Carib spirit of resistance.

== Notable people ==
- Irvince Auguiste – Former Chief of the Kalinago Territory in Dominica, and founder of Touna Auté living village.
- Sylvanie Burton – The first woman and first Kalinago president of Dominica, inaugurated in 2023.
- Nona Aquan – Artist and Carib Queen of the Santa Rosa First Peoples Community in Arima, Trinidad and Tobago.
- Anette Sanford – Dominican nurse, first female Kalinago Chief in Dominica in 400 years, and Senator in the Dominican House of Assembly.
- Claudius Sanford – Former Dominican Senator, resident of the Carib Territory, and husband of the Kalinago Chief Annette Sandford.
- Nasio Fontaine – Reggae artist from Dominica.
- Whitney Mélinard – Dominican activist and founder of the Kalinago Ripple Effect Initiative based in the Kalinago Territory.

== See also ==
- Kalinago Genocide of 1626
- Santa Rosa First Peoples Community

== Sources ==
- Keegan, William F.; Hofman, Corinne L. (2017). The Caribbean before Columbus (ebook ed.). New York: Oxford University Press. ISBN 978-0-19-064735-3.
