= Chief of the Kalinago Territory =

The Chief of the Kalinago Territory presides over the Kalinago Council, the local government of the Kalinago Territory (formerly known as the Carib Territory or Carib Reserve). The position is the equivalent of a village council chairperson elsewhere in Dominica. Beginning in the late 20th century, Kalinago Chiefs have also acted as a representative of the Kalinago Territory to other indigenous populations in the Caribbean region, and have worked with organizations including the Caribbean Organization of Indigenous Peoples and the United Nations Working Group on Indigenous Populations.

Historically, the Chief was the leader of the Kalinago, the indigenous inhabitants of Dominica. Under British colonialism, the title was officially recognized as a ceremonial position beginning in 1903, when the Carib Reserve was established. The colonial governor endowed the Carib Chief with a silver-headed staff and a sash embroidered with "The Chief of the Caribs" in gothic lettering. Colonial authorities suspended the position in 1930 after "The Carib War," a brief, but violent, civil disturbance. The position of Chief was finally reinstated in 1953, as part of an island-wide system of local council government. The territory name was changed from "Carib Reserve" to "Kalinago Territory" by an act of the House of Assembly in 2015.

== List ==
Name	Period
Thomas "Indian" Warner	Served 1667–74. Half-English, as a son of Sir Thomas Warner.
Petit François	Served sometime in the first half of the 18th century
(Popot) Wakanik	Served in the middle half of the 18th century
Joseph	Served sometime in the period 1850–75
Brunie	Served sometime in the period 1875–1900
Auguiste François	Served during the period when the Carib Reserve was officially established by the British government
Jules Benjamin Corriette	1916–26
Thomas "Jolly" John	1926–30
Simon John	1930 (six months)
Office suspended	1930–52
Whitney Frederick	1953–59
Jermandois Francis	1959–72
Masclem Frederick	1972–75
Faustulus Frederick	1975–79
Hilary Frederick	1979–84, 1994–98
Irvince Auguiste	1984–94
Garnet Joseph	1998–2004
Charles Williams	2004–09
Garnet Joseph	2009–2014
Charles Williams	2014–2019
Lorenzo Sanford	2019–2024
Anette Sanford	2024–
