= Francine Baron (Miss Dominica) =

Dominican beauty pageant winner

- Born: Bataka, Dominica
- Height: 171 cm (67 in)
- Beauty pageant titleholder
- Title: Miss Dominica 2014 (winner)
- Major competitions: Miss World 2014 (Did not compete)

Francine Tiffany Baron of Grand Bay, Dominica is Dominican model and beauty pageant titleholder who won Miss Dominica 2014.
