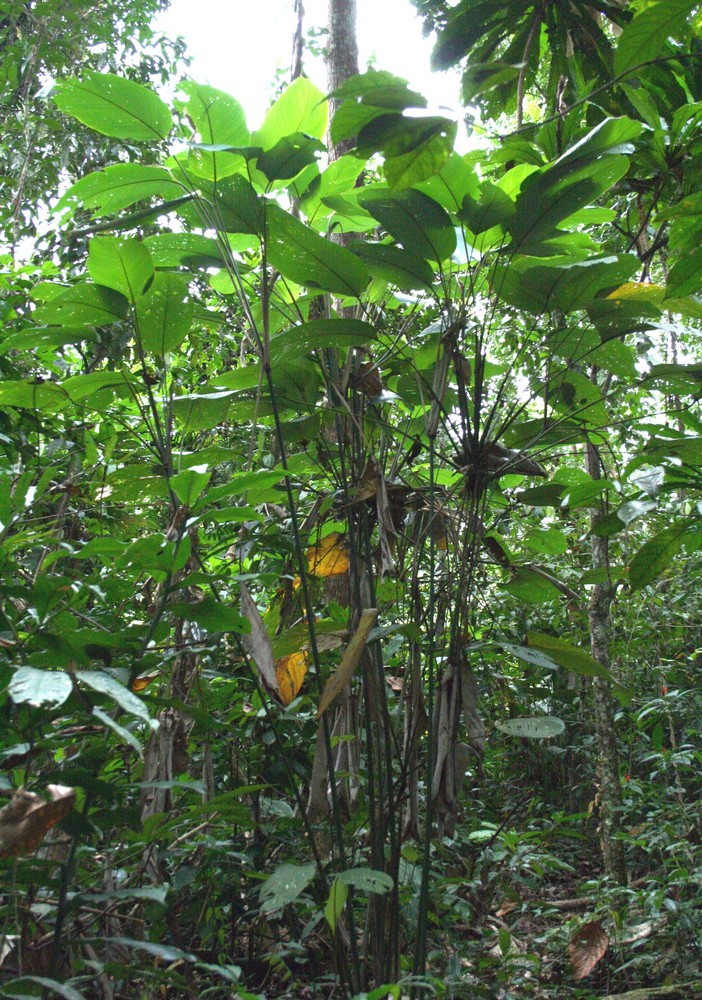

Scientific classification
- Kingdom: Plantae
- Clade: Tracheophytes
- Clade: Angiosperms
- Clade: Monocots
- Clade: Commelinids
- Order: Zingiberales
- Family: Marantaceae
- Genus: Ischnosiphon
- Species: I. obliquus

Binomial name
- Ischnosiphon obliquus (Rudge) Körn.

Synonyms
- Hymenocharis obliqua (Rudge) Salisb. ex Kuntze; Maranta obliqua Rudge

= Ischnosiphon obliquus =

Species of flowering plant

Ischnosiphon obliquus is a species of plant in the Marantaceae family. It is native to tropical South America.

Ischnosiphon obliquus is used locally for medicine and weaving.
