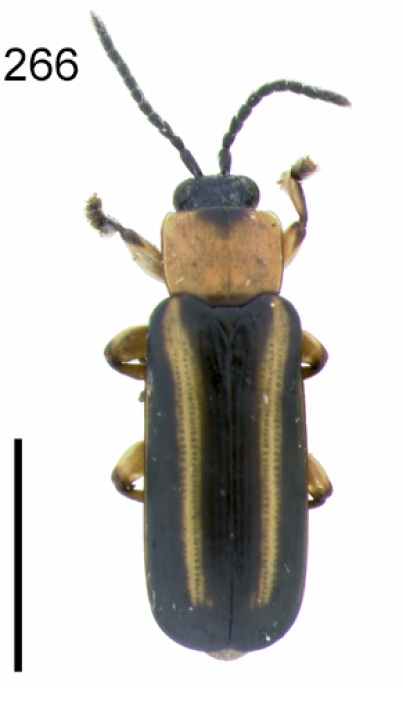

Scientific classification
- Kingdom: Animalia
- Phylum: Arthropoda
- Clade: Pancrustacea
- Class: Insecta
- Order: Coleoptera
- Suborder: Polyphaga
- Infraorder: Cucujiformia
- Family: Chrysomelidae
- Genus: Cephaloleia
- Species: C. vicina

Binomial name
- Cephaloleia vicina Baly, 1858

= Cephaloleia vicina =

Species of beetle

Cephaloleia vicina is a species of beetle of the family Chrysomelidae. It is found in Costa Rica, Guatemala, Mexico, Nicaragua and Panama.

== Description ==
Adults reach a length of about 5.9–6.7 mm. The head, antennae and scutellum are black, while the pronotum is yellow with a triangular black macula behind the head on the anterior margin. The elytron is black with narrow yellow vittae which become obsolete on the apical one-fifth.

== Biology ==
The recorded host plants are Heliconia species (including Heliconia latispatha and Heliconia imbricata), while adults also feed on Heliconia species (including Heliconia psittacurum), but also on Calathea and Ischnosiphon species.
