= Whitney Mélinard =

Dominican activist (born 2001)

Whitney Leah Mélinard (born 2001) is a Kalinago activist from Dominica. She is the founder of the Kalinago Ripple Effect Initiative to promote solutions to social issues in the Kalinago Territory.

== Biography ==
Mélinard is from the village of Mahaut River in the Kalinago Territory. She attended Sineku Primary School and Castle Bruce Secondary School. After sitting for the Caribbean Secondary Education Certificate exams in 2018, she entered the LEAD Institute to study law.

In 2017, Hurricane Maria damaged much infrastructure in Dominica; several parts of the island, including the Kalinago Territory, still lacked Wireless internet service in 2020. In spite of this limitation, the government mandated online learning for students during the COVID-19 pandemic. In June 2020, Mélinard released a video criticizing the unfairness of this situation. She pointed out that families in these areas were forced to rely on expensive mobile data plans, or to travel outside of the Territory. She also noted that internet service providers may be unwilling to invest in this part of the country due to systematic racism.

Mélinard's video received varying responses. The Minister of Education, Octavia Alfred, dismissed Mélinard's criticism since Mélinard was currently studying outside of the Territory. Oscar George, the Minister of State with responsibility for Telecommunications and Broadcasting, admitted that the Kalinago Territory had not been reconnected to the Internet; he still took issue with the charge of racism, saying that "Government is not mandated to develop telecommunication infrastructure and services". Craig Nesty, the Executive Director of the National Telecommunications Regulatory Commission (NTRC), attributed delays to business considerations of the telecom sector. However, both opposition Senator Ernie Jno Finn and the Minister for Rural Modernization Cozier Frederick voiced support for Mélinard. The CEO of Digicel Dominica contacted Mélinard personally to discuss ways to improve. In a December 2020 poll held by the Kalinago Association, Mélinard was voted the Most Inspiring Kalinago Youth (Female) of 2020.

Mélinard used her platform to bring attention to other issues facing the Kalinago. In an Inter Press Service interview, she proposed granting land titles for the Kalinago as a means of economic independence, and spoke of the need to consider indigenous viewpoints in international environmental accords. In January 2021, she founded the Kalinago Ripple Effect Initiative, a social advocacy group with six focus areas: combating child abuse, promoting disability rights, elder care, treating substance and alcohol abuse, increasing vocational training and employment, and promoting self-identity and leadership. She advocated improving the curriculum of Kalinago history and language taught in schools.

In March 2021, Mélinard wrote an open letter to the president of the National Youth Council of Dominica (NYCD). In her letter, Mélinard criticised the NYCD 1st Vice President Phael Lander for leading a youth rally for the ruling Dominica Labour Party. The NYCD is an explicitly nonpartisan NGO, and Lander's public partisanship contravened its Constitution. While the NYCD executive initially refrained from disciplining Lander, it eventually suspended him for three weeks in the face of public pressure.

In May 2021, Mélinard joined the Alternative Peoples' Party (APP) and became its 2nd Deputy Leader. She stated that she did not intend to run for political office, but rather to increase public awareness of Kalinago issues. Mélinard resigned in October 2021 to protest infighting among the party founders. In her resignation letter, she stated her plan to take a hiatus from politics and complete further education.
