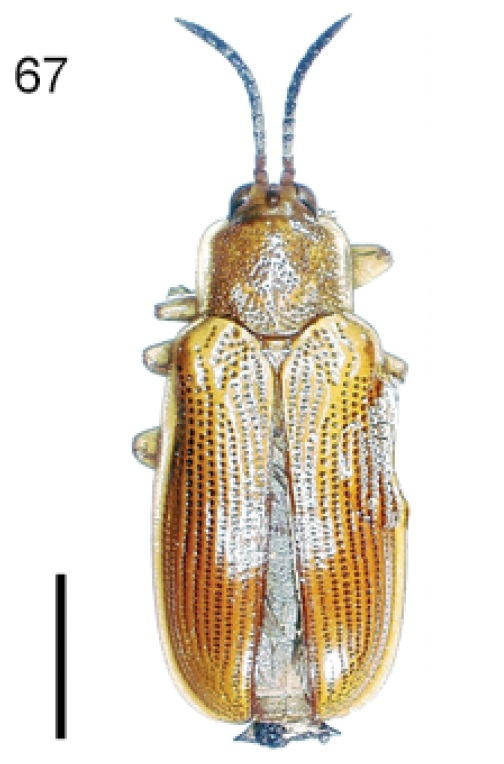

Scientific classification
- Kingdom: Animalia
- Phylum: Arthropoda
- Clade: Pancrustacea
- Class: Insecta
- Order: Coleoptera
- Suborder: Polyphaga
- Infraorder: Cucujiformia
- Family: Chrysomelidae
- Genus: Cephaloleia
- Species: C. affinis

Binomial name
- Cephaloleia affinis Baly, 1858

= Cephaloleia affinis =

Species of beetle

Cephaloleia affinis is a species of beetle of the family Chrysomelidae. It is found in Bolivia, Brazil (Amazonas, Pará, São Paulo), Colombia, Ecuador, French Guiana, Guyana, Peru, Suriname and Venezuela.

== Description ==
Adults reach a length of about 9–10.1 mm. They are reddish-yellow.

== Biology ==
The hostplant is unknown, but adults have been collected on Ischnosiphon or Monotagna species and Heliconia stricta.
