= 2023 Dominican presidential election =

- 27 September 2023
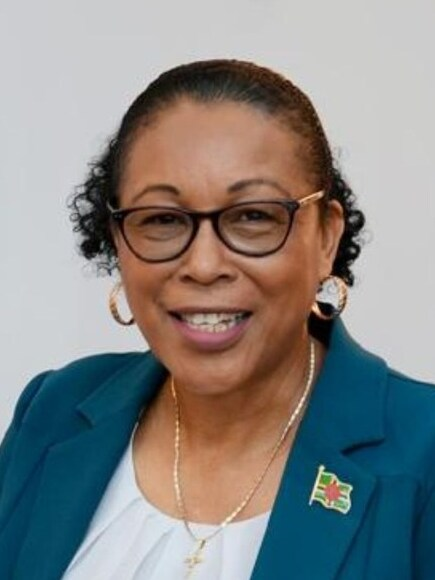

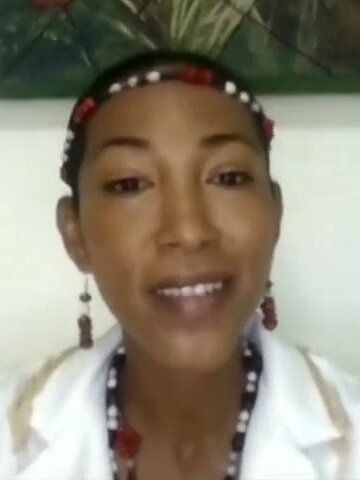
Nominee	Sylvanie Burton	Anette Sanford
Party	DLP	UWP
Electoral vote	20	5
Percentage	80%	20%
President before election
Charles Savarin
DLP
Elected President
Sylvanie Burton
DLP

An indirect presidential election was held on 27 September 2023 to elect the next President of Dominica.

President Charles Savarin was ineligible for re-election, the Constitution of Dominica prohibiting him from a third term.

Prime Minister of Dominica Roosevelt Skerrit of the Dominica Labour Party proposed Sylvanie Burton as a candidate, making her the likely first woman president and first of the indigenous Kalinago community.

Sylvanie Burton however did not receive the support of opposition leader Jesma Paul-Victor, making an election by unanimity impossible. Skerrit thus informed the parliament of the situation on 12 September, triggering an election two weeks later between Burton and the candidate of the opposition, Anette Sanford, who is also a Kalinago woman

Burton was elected on 27 September, and was sworn in on 2 October.

== Results ==
2023 Dominican presidential election
Candidate	Party	Votes	%
Sylvanie Burton	Dominica Labour Party	20	80.00
Anette Sanford	United Workers' Party	5	20.00
Total		25	100.00
Valid votes		25	100.00
Invalid/blank votes		0	0.00
Total votes		25	100.00
Registered voters/turnout		32	78.12
