= Indigenous peoples of Grenada =

The Indigenous peoples of Grenada were the original inhabitants of the island prior to European colonization. The Indigenous peoples of Grenada did not survive on the island following colonization. The Indigenous people who lived on Grenada are sometimes collectively referred to as "Kalinago", which is a term used by contemporary Indigenous communities in Dominica and Saint Vincent and the Grenadines, but the term may not be applicable to all Indigenous peoples throughout the Lesser Antilles throughout history. The French colonists noted two groups on Grenada, who they referred to as "Galibis" and "Caribs", but they may have been referring to the Kalinago people as "Galibis" and a non-Kalinago Arakawan-speaking people as "Caribs".

== History ==
Indigenous peoples from South America began arriving in Grenada around 200 to 300 BCE. Archaeologists called this first wave of people the Saladoid culture.

In 1649, the French in Grenada distinguished between two groups: Caraïbes and Galibis. Recent archaeological research in Grenada suggests that the so-called "Island Caribs" of the historic period may have been composed of two distinct groups: the "Caraïbe" (likely the long-term Indigenous inhabitants who produced Suazan Troumassoid pottery) and the "Galibis" (newer arrivals from the mainland who produced Cayo pottery). According to the French missionary and linguist Raymond Breton, Camáhogne was an Indigenous term for the island.

Following several unsuccessful attempts at colonization, the French were able to establish a colony in Grenada at St. Georges by 1649. Within 114 years, the French had killed most of the Indigenous population of Grenada. In 1650 or 1651, the French battled the Indigenous people at Leapers' Hill, resulting in 40 Indigenous people leaping to their deaths from a cliff.

Although the Indigenous people did not survive in Grenada, remnants of their history remain on the island. Indigenous petroglyphs can be found at several locations in Grenada, including what are referred to as the "Carib Stones" in Waltham and the petroglyphs at Mt. Rich.

According to a 2006 note about Grenada from the United States Department of State, most Grenadians are of African descent with minorities of East Asian and European descent, with only "some trace" of the Indigenous peoples remaining.

== Notable Indigenous people from Grenada ==
- Kaïrouane, an Indigenous leader

== See also ==
- Indigenous archaeology
- Indigenous peoples of the Caribbean
- Precolonial Saba
- Pre-Columbian Antigua and Barbuda
- Pre-Columbian Jamaica
