= Ischnosiphon leucophaeus =

Scientific classification
- Kingdom: Plantae
- Clade: Tracheophytes
- Clade: Angiosperms
- Clade: Monocots
- Clade: Commelinids
- Order: Zingiberales
- Family: Marantaceae
- Genus: Ischnosiphon
- Species: I. leucophaeus

Binomial name
- Ischnosiphon leucophaeus (Poepp. & Endl.) Körn.

Species of flowering plant

Ischnosiphon leucophaeus is a species of plant in the family Marantaceae. Its native range is from Nicaragua south to Brazil.

Ischnosiphon leucophaeus was named by Friedrich August Körnicke. It was first described by Eduard Friedrich Poeppig and Stephan Ladislaus Endlicher.

In Peru, I. leucophaeus is used in shamanism as one component of a luck charm.
