= Kalinago Territory =

District of Dominica

Kalinago territory "Carib Reserve" "Carib Territory"
- District
- Location of the Kalinago Territory
- Coordinates: 15°29′24″N 61°15′12″W
- Country: Dominica
- Parish: Saint David
- Established: 1903

Government
  - Chief: Anette Sanford

Area
  - Total: 15 km^{2} (5.8 sq mi)

Population (2011)
  - Total: 2,112
  - Density: 140/km^{2} (360/sq mi)
- Time zone: UTC−04:00 (EST)
  - Summer (DST): UTC−03:00 (EDT)

The Kalinago Territory, previously known as the Carib Reserve or Carib Territory (outdated/derogatory), is a 3,700-acre (15 km^{2}) district in the Caribbean island country of Dominica. It was established for the Indigenous Kalinago people who inhabited the region prior to European colonization and settlement.

The Kalinago Territory was officially formed by British colonial authorities in 1903, in a remote and mountainous area of Dominica's Atlantic coast. Its population remained largely isolated from the rest of the island throughout most of the 20th century, with only a ceremonial chief and no other formal self-governance. On September 19, 1930 the rights of the Indigenous Kalinago were infringed upon in an incident called the "1930's Kalinago Uprising." The skirmish occurred at a shop in St. Cyr, one of the eight hamlets, when colonial law enforcement attempted to seize the goods of the people dubbing it as "smuggling." The Kalinago people who traded craft and their own produce with neighbouring islands to support their livelihoods for generations, were suddenly denied their right to trade as Indigenous people during hard economic times due to a recent devastating hurricane. This decision from the colonial law enforcement was met with resistance and resulted in multiple Kalinagos being injured and two Kalinagos shot dead by the police. The people were met with great injustice, and the Chief at that time, Chief Jolly John was wrongfully imprisoned and stripped of his title. The post of chief was abolished for a number of years following the incident. The Chief was reinstated in 1952, and formalized local government was instituted the same year as part of an island-wide system. The "Carib Reserve Act", enacted the year of Dominica's independence in 1978, reaffirmed the Kalinago Territory's boundaries, its land management, and institutions of local government. In the last decades of the 20th century, modern utilities and infrastructure were finally introduced to the Kalinago Territory, which also established contacts with foreign governments and other indigenous peoples in the region.

The present population of the Kalinago Territory is estimated around 3,000 Kalinago people. Legal residents share communal ownership of all land within the Territory. The Kalinago Territory has limited local government in the institutions of the Kalinago Council, and its head the Kalinago Chief, which are the equivalent in power of village councils and council chairpersons elsewhere in Dominica. The administrative centre is in Salybia, the largest of eight hamlets in the Kalinago Territory.

A modern movement in the Kalinago Territory has supported the rediscovery and preservation of Kalinago culture. This has been fueled in part by Dominica's tourist industry. A model Kalinago village was established in the Territory in 2006. Cultural preservation groups stage performances at the model village and other locations, and practice traditional Kalinago crafts, such as making baskets and pottery, that are sold to tourists as souvenirs.

Category 5 Hurricane Maria (which would later strike Puerto Rico) made a direct hit onto Kalinago Territory in September 2017 causing severe damage to the territory, leaving residents in need. Electricity, Internet, and wired telephone service became unavailable in the territory and were expected to remain so for several months.

== History ==
=== Establishment of the "Carib Reserve" ===
Dominica is the only Eastern Caribbean island that still has a population of pre-Columbian Indigenous Kalinago, who were exterminated or driven from neighbouring islands. The Kalinago on Dominica fought against the Spanish and later European settlers for two centuries. Over time, however, their population declined and they were forced into remote regions of the island as European settlers and imported African slaves grew in number on the island. The first reservation of land for the Kalinago people occurred in 1763, when 232 acres (0.94 km^{2}) of mountainous land and rocky shoreline around Salybia, on the east coast, were set aside by British colonial authorities as part of the surveying of the island and its division into lots. A legend arose that this land was set aside by the request of Queen Charlotte, the wife of George III; from this another legend spread, and persisted among some Kalinago to the present, that Charlotte had set aside half of Dominica for the Kalinago people. Later colonial officials were unable to locate any record of a title deed for the 232 acres (0.94 km^{2}), however. European settlers continued attempts to turn the Kalinago lands into plantations through the end of the 18th century, but the Kalinago successfully held out, often with the assistance of runaway slaves.

In 1902, Henry Hesketh Bell, the Administrator of Dominica, sent a lengthy report to the Colonial Office on the state of the Kalinago people after he had visited its communities. He proposed that 3,700 acres (roughly 2% of Dominica's area) be set aside for the Kalinago, and that a Kalinago "chief" be officially recognized and given a token annual allowance of 6 pounds. Bell's proposals were adopted in 1903, formally establishing the "Carib Reserve". Its boundaries were announced in the Official Gazette of Dominica on 4 July 1903. The Kalinago Chief was subsequently endowed with a silver-headed staff, and a ceremonial sash embroidered with "The Chief of the Caribs" in gothic lettering. At the time the "Carib Reserve" was established, the Kalinago population of around 400 was extremely isolated from the rest of Dominica, but the community appreciated the token symbols.

=== "The Carib War" ===
The population of the "Carib Reserve" remained disconnected from the rest of Dominica, seldom seen and largely self-sustaining apart from some limited illegal trade with the neighboring French islands of Marie Galante and Martinique. The colonial Administrator decided to crack down on this smuggling due to its impact on revenues, and in 1930, five armed policemen entered the Territory to seize smuggled goods and to arrest suspects. When the police tried to seize a quantity of rum and tobacco and to take away suspects in Salybia, a crowd gathered in response and hurled stones and bottles. The police fired into the crowd, injuring four, of whom two later died. The police were beaten but managed to escape to Marigot, without having seized prisoners or contraband. The Administrator responded by summoning the Royal Navy light cruiser HMS Delhi to the coast, which fired star shells into the air and displayed searchlights along the shore; the Kalinago ran in fear from this display of force and hid in the woods. Marines landed to aid local police in the search for the perpetrators of the disturbance. Accurate news of the incident was difficult to come by, and rumors instead spread throughout the island of a Kalinago uprising. The Times incorrectly reported that Kalinago had looted and rioted in the capital, Roseau. The incident is still hyperbolically known as "The Carib War."

Kalinago Chief Jolly John subsequently surrendered to authorities in Roseau and was charged, with five other Kalinago, with wounding the police officers and theft, though the prosecution fell apart by the following year. A commission of inquiry was appointed in 1931 by the Governor of the Leeward Islands to investigate the 1930 incident and the situation of the Kalinago generally. The final report found fault on all sides. As a consequence for the Kalinago, the position of Chief was eliminated, the staff and sash were confiscated, and the former chief was forbidden to call himself "king."

=== Local government and modern developments ===
The Administrator did not relent to Kalinago petitions for the restoration of the position of Chief until June 1952, when he personally conducted an investiture ceremony and presented the new chief with the staff and sash. Later that year, the Kalinago Council was created as part of a system of local government for the whole island.

The "Carib Reserve Act" was enacted in 1978, the year of Dominican independence. It reaffirmed the boundaries set in 1903, and legally established common ownership of land within the Kalinago Territory. A broader consequence of the Act was a renewed interest in the distinctiveness of Kalinago identity and in Kalinago culture. Though under the "Carib Reserve Act", the area was formerly referred to as the 'Carib Reserve', an amendment was approved and added in 2015 and the area's official name is now the Kalinago Territory. Considering the word "reserve" a relic of colonialism and exploitation, as well as negative connotations with the "Carib" (the root of the word 'cannibal'), given to them by European colonizers, Kalinago Territory residents urged the Dominica House of Assembly to officially change the name. The Parliament of the Commonwealth of Dominica officially recognized the Kalinago's petition to change the name of "Carib Territory" to "Kalinago Territory". The name change applies to the Chief as well, who is now referred to as Kalinago Chief.

The communities of the Kalinago Territory remained isolated into the late 20th century. A motorable road was not laid through the Territory until 1970; telephone service and electricity were established in the 1980s. The Kalinago Territory was one of the last areas of Dominica to receive electricity, which began to be installed in 1986. By 1990, 55% of Kalinago households still did not have access to electricity, and 85% of households did not live within 5 minutes of their nearest water supply. The Kalinago people have remained possibly the poorest segment of the population of Dominica, which is in turn one of the poorest countries of the Lesser Antilles.

In the 1980s, the Kalinago Territory began to receive material, financial and ideological support from foreign governments, including the United States, Canada, and United Kingdom. The Territory's leaders also reached out to other indigenous populations in the region, organizing a conference held in Saint Vincent; the Caribbean Organization of Indigenous Peoples was subsequently formed. Successive Kalinago Chiefs also worked with the United Nations Working Group on Indigenous Populations.

== Geography ==
The Kalinago Territory is located in the north-east of Dominica, on the Atlantic (windward) coast. It comprises 3,700 acres (15 km^{2}) in Saint David Parish, within boundaries first established by colonial authorities in 1903, and reaffirmed in Articles 41 and 42 of the "Carib Reserve Act" in 1978. The Dominican government may grant additional lands to the Territory, though it has never done so.

Most of the territory is uninhabited. Though the Kalinago Territory adjoins Dominica's east coast, due to its rugged topography it only has two access points to the Atlantic Ocean, both of which are difficult landings. The land is mostly of poor quality, with the worst soil erosion on Dominica, and deforestation that has destroyed many streams in the Territory. In 1947 Henri Stehlé, a French botanist working in Guadeloupe and Martinique, carried out an inventory of the flora of the Kalinago Territory which gave rise to a scientific article, which today bears witness to the remains of primitive plant groups present at the time, before to be reduced by land clearing.

The Kalinago Council and police station are located in the hamlet of Salybia, the administrative center of the Kalinago Territory. There are seven other hamlets besides Salybia in the Kalinago Territory: Bataka, Crayfish River, St. Cyr, Gaulette River, Mahaut River, Sinecou, and Concord. Aside from small shops selling Kalinago crafts, these settlements, and the small farms surrounding them, do not differ significantly from the rest of Dominica.

== Demographics ==
The Kalinago Territory has an estimated population of around 3,000, which makes it the largest settlement of indigenous people in the Caribbean. The population of the Kalinago Territory was only around 400 at the time of its formation in 1903. This has grown over time, both in absolute numbers and in proportion to the total population of Dominica. In 1970, the population of the Kalinago Territory was 1.6% of Dominica's total population. As of the 1991 government census, this had increased to 3.5%, with the population of the Kalinago Territory (including the nearby non-Kalinago village, Atkinson) counted at 2,518 people; this increase was reflected in a large proportion of young adults and children.

Residents of the Kalinago Territory are among the poorest in Dominica. Territory residents are less educated, and have fewer work opportunities than other segments of the island's population.

== Government and land management ==
The Kalinago Council comprises five members and the presiding Kalinago Chief. Popular elections are held every five years. Notwithstanding the different titles, these institutions have the same powers and responsibilities as other village councils in Dominica, with the Kalinago Chief equal to a village council chairman.

The Kalinago are also represented in the House of Assembly of Dominica as part of the Salybia constituency. Though its Representative has more power in practice, the Kalinago Chief is utilized more as a spokesperson for the Territory.

As established by Article 25(1) of the "Carib Reserve Act", all land within the Kalinago Territory is under the "sole custody, management and control" of the Kalinago Council and Chief. No individuals can buy or sell parcels of land or encumber it as collateral. Kalinago residents instead have usufruct rights: they can claim vacant, unused land to work and build a home upon, subject to approval by the Kalinago Council. Land left untended for more than a year is considered vacant and may be claimed. Soil erosion and deforestation have been attributed to this common ownership, as the land is intensively used by a rapid succession of tenants.

Because of the usufruct rights over the communally held land, legal residency in the Territory is a significant issue. Under Article 51 of the "Carib Reserve Act", an individual becomes a legal resident and member of the Kalinago Territory community by birth; if at least one parent is Kalinago; or after 12 years of lawful residency within the Territory. The latter criterion has been a target of criticism from the Kalinago people, who view it as a means by which non-Kalinago may appropriate their land.

== Culture and tourism ==
Beginning in the late 20th century, the people of the Kalinago Territory have had a renewed interest in Kalinago culture and identity. This has been motivated in part by the tourism industry in Dominica, in the forms of both ecotourism and cultural tourism. The Territory and its residents receive very little revenue from tourism, however; there is no entry fee for visitors or any site management fees charged for nature activities, and most visitors stay and arrange their travel from outside the Territory. Images of the Kalinago Territory and its people have also been used to promote tourism to Dominica as a whole, rather than the Kalinago Territory specifically.

Kalinago arts and crafts are widely sold in the Territory, and elsewhere in Dominica, as souvenirs. Chief among these is the larouma reed basket, which is handmade in brown, white, and black traditional designs; this craft has been noted as one of the few enduring aspects of traditional Kalinago culture.

The Kalinago Barana Auté, a representation of a pre-Columbian Kalinago village, is located in the hamlet of Crayfish River. In the Kalinago language, the name translates to "Kalinago cultural village by the sea." It opened in April 2006, with funding from the Dominican government. The village was based on a concept of Faustulus Frederick, who served as Kalinago Chief from 1975 to 1978. Its goal is to recreate and promote awareness of Kalinago traditions and culture. Its central feature is a karbet, a kind of large hut that used to be located in the center of a Kalinago village. The main karbet (biggest hut) is used to stage presentations of Kalinago culture, such as dance performances. Other traditional cultural demonstrations at the Kalinago Barana Auté include pottery making, cassava processing, and basket weaving.

Numerous organizations seek to preserve, teach, and promote Kalinago culture. Among these are the Karifuna Cultural Group and Karina Cultural Group, which stage music and dance performances for tourists at the Kalinago Barana Auté and a small stage in Bataka. The Karifuna Cultural Group has traveled throughout the Caribbean, as well as South America and Europe, promoting Kalinago cultural heritage. The Karina Cultural Group has also established ties with Amerindian groups in South America. The Waitukubuli Karifuna Development Committee has built several traditional buildings in Salybia. Among these is the church of St. Marie of the Kalinago, which is decorated with murals depicting Kalinago history, and has a Kalinago canoe for an altar.

== See also ==
- Chief of the Kalinago Territory
- Indian reservation
- Indian reserve
- Indigenous movements in the Americas
