= Miss Dominica =

Beauty pageant

Miss Dominica Queen Foundation
- Formation: 1945
- Type: Beauty pageant
- Headquarters: Roseau
- Location: Dominica
- Official language: English
- Organization: LIME
- Website: Official page

Miss Dominica Queen is a national beauty pageant in Dominica.

== History ==
In 2013, the Miss Dominica Organization declared its return to the Miss World pageant in Jakarta, Indonesia. Miss Dominica 2013 Leslassa Armour-Shillingford represented her country at the pageant and was selected as a finalist for the talent segment.

Miss Dominica 2013 competed among other contestants from around the world in several categories, which spanned over the month. These categories included Beach Fashion, Top Model, Sports and Fitness, Beauty with a Purpose, Talent Competition and the World Fashion Designer Award.

== International winners ==
Miss Carifta 1973 — Esther Fadelle-Morris

== Titleholders ==
- Francine Tiffany Baron (2014)
