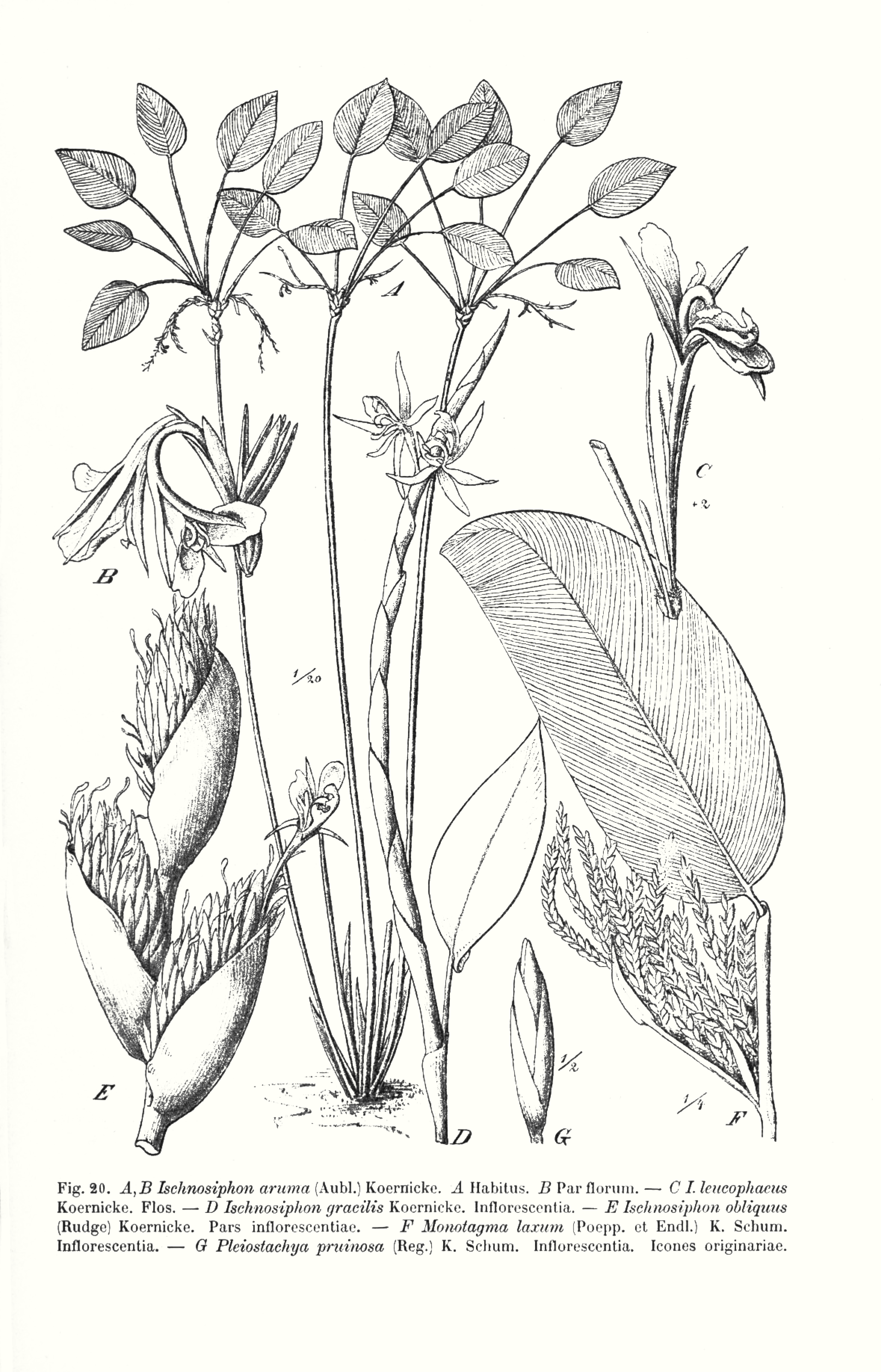

Scientific classification
- Kingdom: Plantae
- Clade: Tracheophytes
- Clade: Angiosperms
- Clade: Monocots
- Clade: Commelinids
- Order: Zingiberales
- Family: Marantaceae
- Genus: Ischnosiphon
- Species: I. arouma

Binomial name
- Ischnosiphon arouma (Aubl.) Körn.

Synonyms
- Hymenocharis arouma (Aubl.) Kuntze; Maranta arouma Aubl.

= Ischnosiphon arouma =

Species of flowering plant

Ischnosiphon arouma is a species of plant in the Marantaceae family. This species is found in wet, tropical areas within the Lesser Antilles, as well as Central and South America. It is a perennial.

Ischnosiphon arouma is used to make baskets.
