= Anette Sanford =

Politician from Dominica

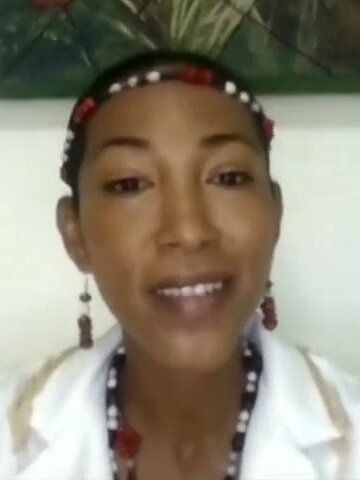
- Sanford in 2025

Chief of the Kalinago Territory
- Incumbent
- Assumed office 2024
- Preceded by: Lorenzo Sanford

Senator of the House of Assembly of Dominica
- In office 10 February 2020 – 6 December 2022

Personal details
- Born: Anette Thomas; April 1983 (age 43) Sineku, Kalinago Territory, Dominica
- Party: United Workers' Party
- Spouse: Claudius Sanford

Anette Thomas-Sanford (born April 1983) is a Dominican nurse and politician, and in 2024 became the first woman to serve as Chief of the Kalinago Territory in 400 years. She served as a Senator in the House of Assembly from 10 February 2020 to 6 December 2022 for the opposition United Workers' Party.

== Early life ==
Anette Thomas was born to a farming family in the Kalinago Territory village of Sineku in April 1983. She was the seventh of eight children; her mother died when Thomas was seven years old. Thomas later married Claudius Sanford.

Sanford graduated with an associate degree in nursing from Dominica State College, and studied health administration at St. Lawrence College, Ontario. She later completed a Bachelor of Science in nursing from the University of Edinburgh via distance learning. In 2018, she launched a six-month program to train professional caregivers for the elderly, children, and the disabled; seventeen students completed the program in its first offering.

== Politics ==
Sanford initially ran for Chief of the Kalinago Territory in 2019, after working as a registered nurse for ten years. She was the only female candidate, and had she won, she would have become the first female chief since the colonial era. Sanford took part in the election debate held on 18 July 2019. In the election on 22 July 2019, Sanford lost by three votes to Lorenzo Sanford. This result was also affected by rejected ballots: nine ballots for Sanford were rejected, while only three were rejected for Lorenzo. Although all candidates were officially nonpartisan, Lorenzo had been endorsed by the local branch chairman of the ruling Dominica Labour Party (DLP).

In August 2019, the Salybia constituency candidate for the opposition United Workers' Party (UWP), Worrel Sanford, decided to withdraw. Sanford then accepted the UWP nomination as its candidate for the 2019 general election. She also praised the UWP's proposal to give the Kalinago Chief a seat in the House of Assembly of Dominica. At the official launch of her campaign in November, Sanford revealed that DLP officials had offered EC$120,000 and a job promotion if she would withdraw. She lost to the incumbent DLP candidate Cozier Frederick by 265 votes.

Sanford was chosen as one of the UWP's four Senators for the new parliamentary term, taking the oath of office on 10 February 2020. She became the first female Kalinago Senator. She joined the UWP's COVID-19 committee to educate the public. During Nurses Week (11–17 May 2020), Sanford announced that she would donate half of her Senator salary to the Dominica Nurses Association to support its work during the COVID-19 pandemic in Dominica. She also started a Backyard Garden Initiative in the Territory to help residents during the downturn in tourism. In the interest of transparency, Sanford pushed for regular audits of Kalinago Council finances; before 2020, the Council had not been audited for a decade.

In 2021, Sanford co-founded a non-governmental organization called Kibe'kuati to support community development projects in the Kalinago Territory.

Sanford participated in the united opposition boycott of the 2022 Dominican general election. At the November 2022 UWP delegates conference, Sanford contested the election for deputy political leader. The other candidate, Clement Marcellin, was running for both the leader and deputy leader positions. Marcellin defeated Sanford for deputy leader (142 to 54), but lost the leader election (79 to 123). In September 2023, Sanford was nominated by parliamentary opposition leader Jesma Paul-Victor as a candidate for the 2023 Dominican presidential election.

Sanford was ultimately elected Chief of the Kalinago Territory in July 2024, becoming the first female chief of the tribe in 400 years.

In 2026, she was named as the recipient of the annual Seacology Prize, in recognition of her efforts to defend Dominica's threatened ecosystems and preserve its Indigenous culture.
