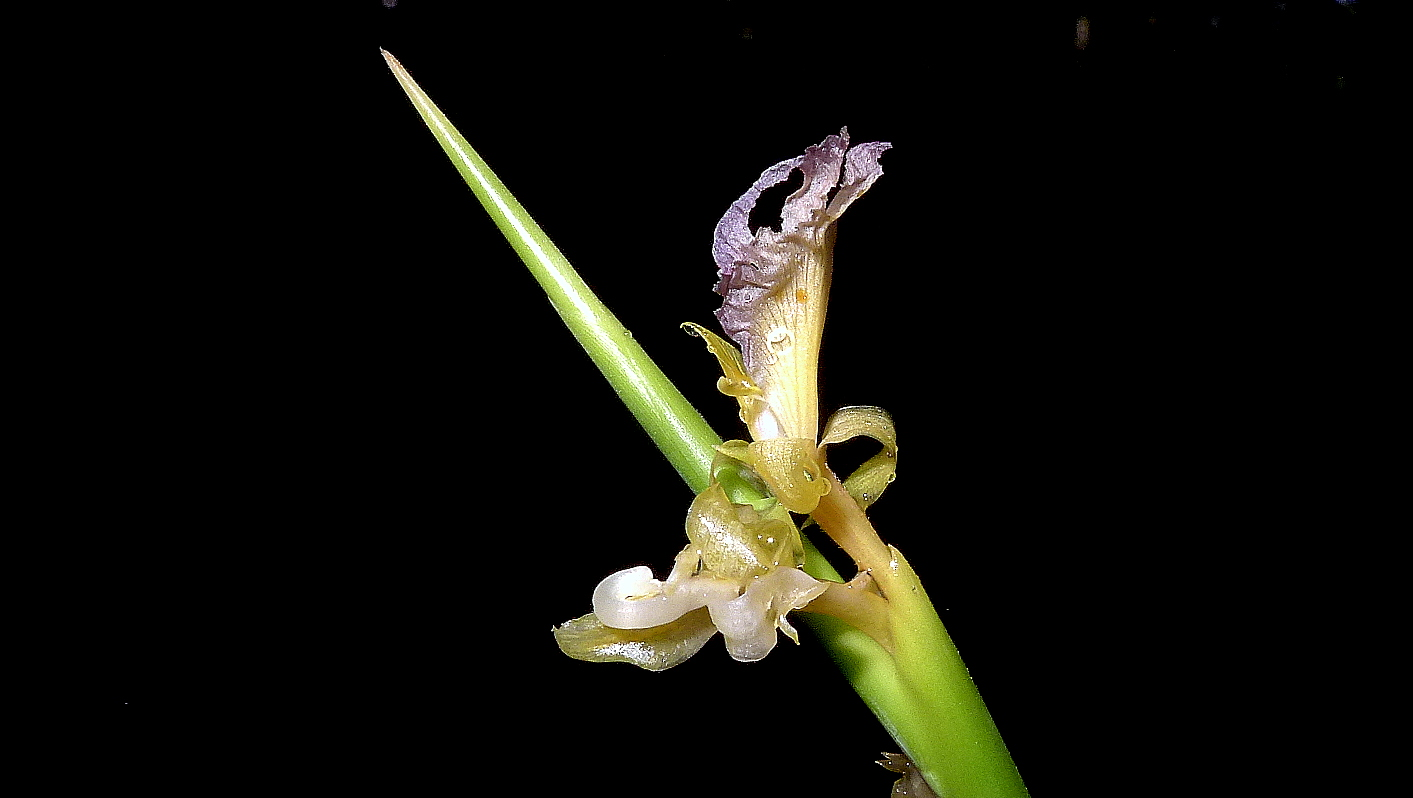
- Ischnosiphon gracilis

Scientific classification
- Kingdom: Plantae
- Clade: Tracheophytes
- Clade: Angiosperms
- Clade: Monocots
- Clade: Commelinids
- Order: Zingiberales
- Family: Marantaceae
- Genus: Ischnosiphon; Körn.

Type species
- Ischnosiphon arouma (Aubl.) Körn.

Synonyms
- Hymenocharis Salisb. ex Kuntze 1891 illegitimate homonym, not Salisb. 1812

= Ischnosiphon =

Genus of flowering plants

Ischnosiphon is a genus of plants native to Central America, South America, Trinidad and the Lesser Antilles. It was first described as a genus in 1859.

Ischnosiphon species are traditionally used for weaving. In Suriname, the stems of several Ischnosiphon species, known locally as warimbo, are used for weaving baskets. Similarly, in Peru, several species of Ischnosiphon including I. puberulus, I. arouma, and I. obliquus, known locally as huarumá (Spanish) and dexpe (Ticuna), are culturally important for making traditional fabric.

Species

- Ischnosiphon annulatus - Peru, Ecuador
- Ischnosiphon arouma - from Panama + Leeward Is to Bolivia
- Ischnosiphon bahiensis - Bahia
- Ischnosiphon cannoideus - S Colombia, S Venezuela, NW Brazil
- Ischnosiphon caudatus - Loreto
- Ischnosiphon centricifolius - Guyana, French Guiana
- Ischnosiphon cerotus - Peru, Ecuador, Colombia
- Ischnosiphon colombianus - Colombia
- Ischnosiphon crassispicus - B Amazonas
- Ischnosiphon elegans - Costa Rica, Nicaragua, Panama
- Ischnosiphon enigmaticus - Guyana, French Guiana, Venezuela
- Ischnosiphon flagellatus - N Brazil
- Ischnosiphon foliosus - Guyana
- Ischnosiphon fusiformis - Peru
- Ischnosiphon gracilis - South America
- Ischnosiphon grandibracteatus - Colombia, NW Brazil
- Ischnosiphon heleniae - Costa Rica, Colombia, Panama
- Ischnosiphon hirsutus - South America
- Ischnosiphon idrobonis - Colombia
- Ischnosiphon inflatus - from Nicaragua to Peru
- Ischnosiphon killipii - Ecuador, Loreto, B Amazonas
- Ischnosiphon lasiocoleus - Colombia, Peru, Bolivia, NW Brazil
- Ischnosiphon leucophaeus - Central + South America
- Ischnosiphon longiflorus - N South America
- Ischnosiphon macarenae - Peru, Ecuador, Colombia
- Ischnosiphon martianus - Suriname, Fr Guiana, N Brazil
- Ischnosiphon obliquus - N South America
- Ischnosiphon ovatus - SE Brazil
- Ischnosiphon parvifolius - Loreto
- Ischnosiphon paryrizinho - N Brazil
- Ischnosiphon petiolatus - Suriname, Fr Guiana, Guyana, N Brazil
- Ischnosiphon polyphyllus - S Colombia, S Venezuela, NW Brazil
- Ischnosiphon puberulus - South America
- Ischnosiphon rotundifolius - Peru, Ecuador, Colombia
- Ischnosiphon surumuensis - S Venezuela, N Brazil
- Ischnosiphon ursinus - Fr Guiana, Venezuela, N Brazil
