= Kaïrouane =

Indigenous King of Grenada

Chief Kaïrouane (or Kaierouane) was an Indigenous leader on the island of Grenada at the time of French colonization in 1649. He is known only from a short passage in an account of the first decade of the French colony. In this account, Kaïrouane approached the scout, La Rivière, sent to negotiate land for the new settlement. An exchange of gifts ensued, which the French disingenuously interpreted as a purchase of land. According to some, Kariouane's hospitality and cordiality with the French settlers upset other Indigenous villages, particularly in St. Vincent, who embarked on occasional raids and attacks of the colonists. Thereafter, Kaïrouane disappears from historical records.

== Resistance to European assault ==
Since the arrival of the Spanish to the Caribbean islands, the Indigenous people of the Lesser Antilles successfully resisted the interlopers. They kept the Spanish at bay in Puerto Rico and out of the islands to the south. With the Spanish decline in the region after the 1590s, the Indigenous people enjoyed a short respite. The early 1600s, however, soon saw the arrival of the more economically aggressive English, Dutch and the French, who came to challenge the Spanish supremacy in the area. These nations had chosen to cross the "poison arrow curtain" and face the Indigenous forces believing that their islands would be easier to conquer than the Spanish fortified settlements on the Greater Antilles.

The Indigenous people, confronted with what was now a war of retreat, reorganized their communities for a protracted conflict and chose even smaller islands which they could defend more effectively. European colonists appeared with some regularity, but because of the resistance they soon encountered, none had yet attempted to establish a plantation in Grenada until 1649. In March, the French governor of Martinique, Jacques du Parquet, arrived with a strong contingent and in a week erected the first settlement at Port Louis.

== Death ==
On the 30th of May 1650 (or 1651) Kaïrouane's camp was attacked by a band of Frenchmen, a majority of the Indigenous people were killed whilst forty-or-so managed to escape to the northernmost edge of the island, where they decided to jump off instead of facing execution or enslavement by the French colonists. There is a monument which stands where they jumped off near Sauteurs.

== See also ==
- Saint Patrick Parish, Grenada
- History of Grenada
- Leapers' Hill
