= Corinne Hofman =

Dutch professor of Caribbean Archaeology

Corinne Lisette Hofman
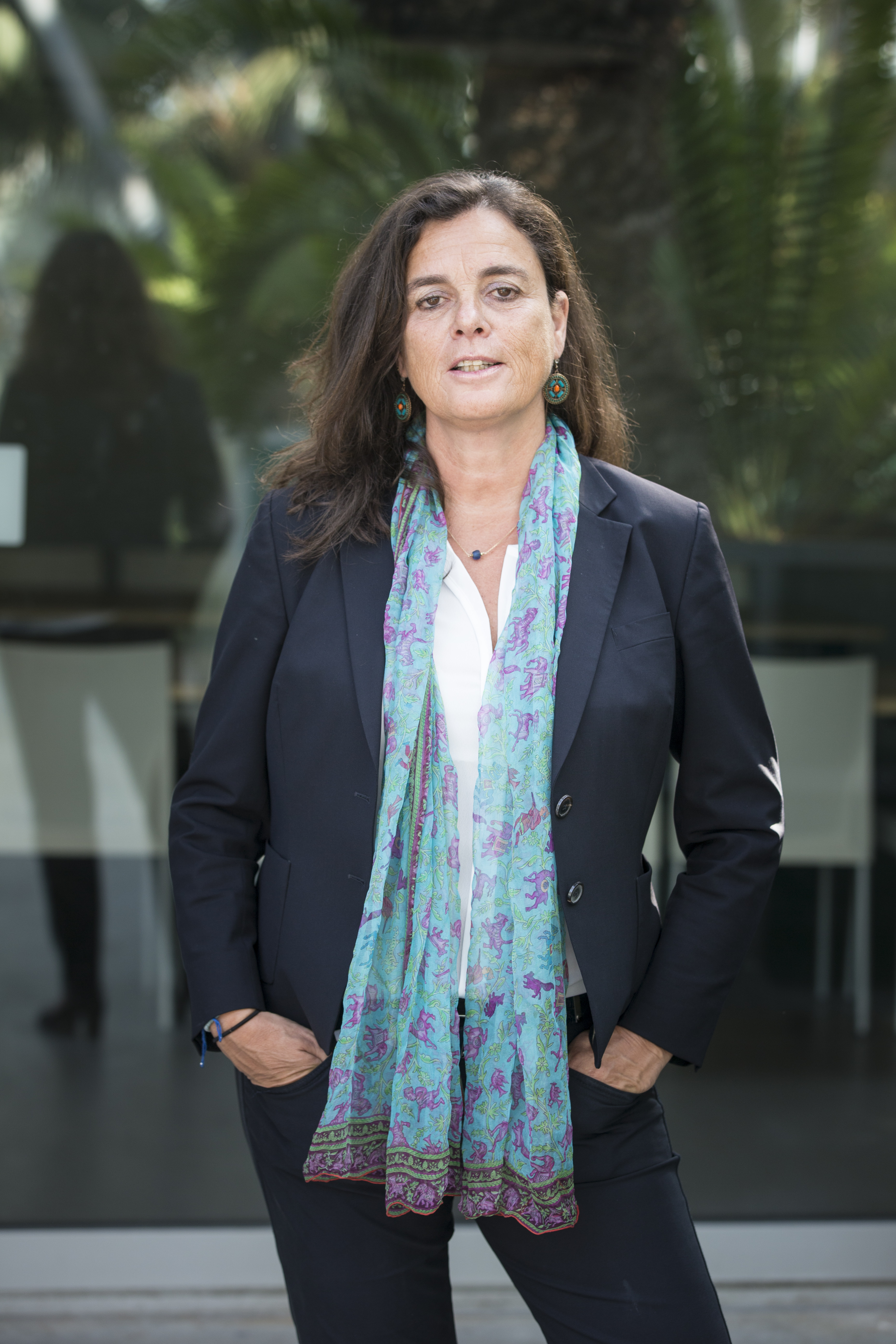
- Corinne Hofman (2014)
- Born: 10 July 1959 (age 67); Wassenaar, The Netherlands
- Education: Leiden University
- Occupation: Archaeologist

Corinne Lisette Hofman FBA (born 10 July 1959) is a Dutch professor of Caribbean Archaeology at Leiden University since 2007, who has been awarded several accolades including the Dutch Spinoza Prize. In 2023 the University of Leiden placed her on leave to investigate long-running cases of intimidation, discrimination, abuse of power and violation of scientific integrity.

== Career ==
Hofman was born in Wassenaar. She obtained a PhD at Leiden University in 1993 investigating Precolonial Saba. She became a full professor in 2007 and Dean of the Faculty of Archaeology in 2013.

In 2013 Hofman won the Merian Prize of the Royal Netherlands Academy of Arts and Sciences. The Merian Prize is awarded to excelling women scientists, inspiring others to pursue a career in science. In 2014 she was one of four winners of the Dutch Spinoza Prize and received a 2.5 million euro grant. Since 2015 Hofman has been a member of the Royal Netherlands Academy of Arts and Sciences. Hofman was elected a member of Academia Europaea in 2016. In 2018 she was elected a Corresponding Fellow of the British Academy. As of 2024 she was a member of the Editorial Advisory Board of the archaeology journal Antiquity.

In 2023 University of Leiden placed her on leave to investigate long-running cases of intimidation, discrimination, abuse of power and violation of scientific integrity. The accusations related to Hofman and her husband, and fellow member of archaeology department, Menno Hoogland. The following year, the University of Leiden published an anonymised report that substantiated the accusations. The report "describes a decades-long culture of fear in which Hofman and Hoogland exhibited transgressive behaviour, violated scientific integrity, abused their power and possibly committed criminal offences."
