= Leapers' Hill =

Historic site in Grenada

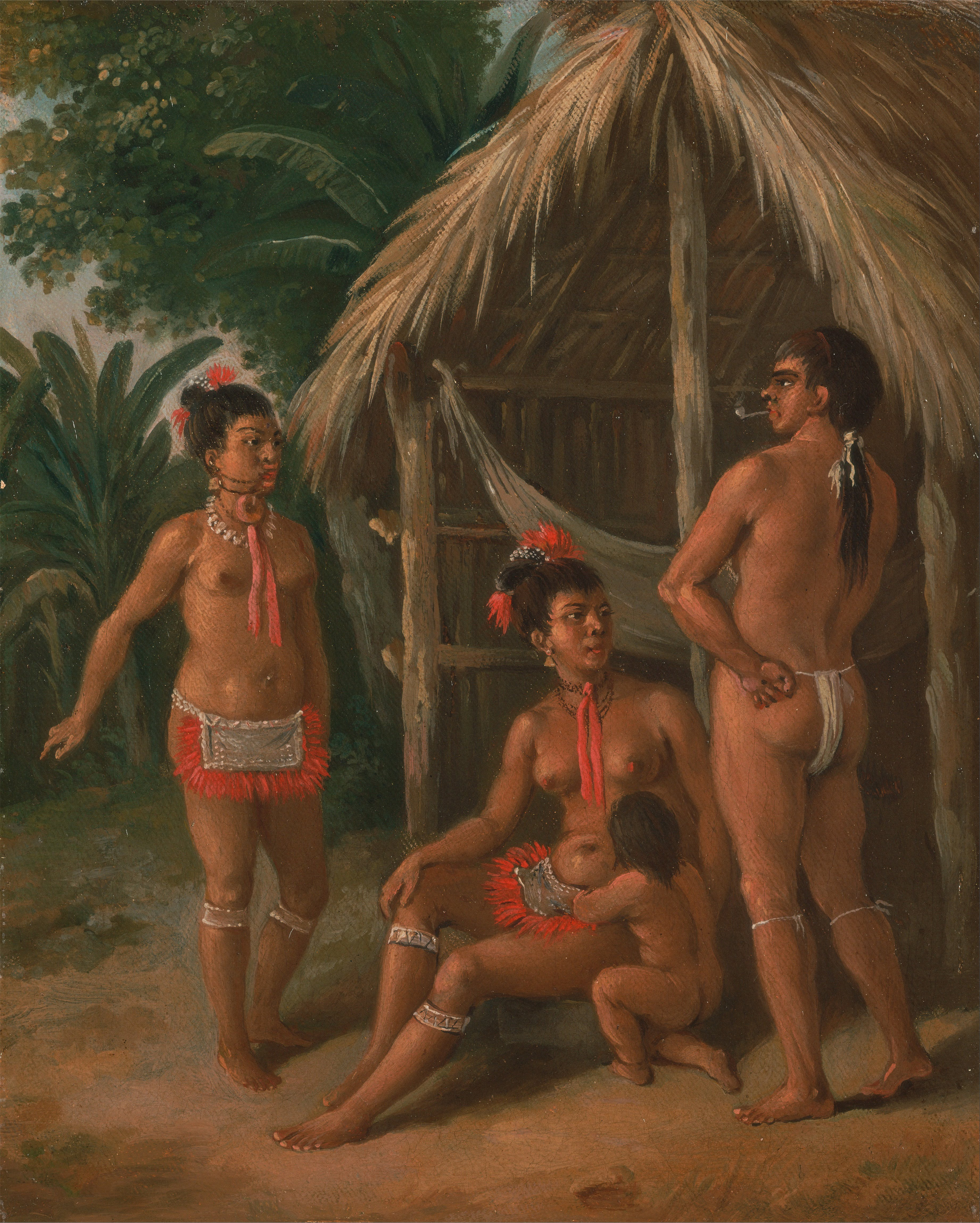
Painting of the Native Kalinago/Carib people

Leapers' Hill (also known as Le Morne de Sauteurs and Carib’s Leap) is a historic site near Sauteurs, Grenada, where a band of forty Indigeous people (sometimes referred to as Kalinago) jumped to their death to avoid capture by the French colonists.

== History ==
In 1649 the first colony on the island of Grenada was established by Du Parquet, the following year Du Parquet bought the island from the Compagnie des Isles d’Amérique (French West Indian company). The French were treated favourably by the Indigenous people under their King Kaïrouane, who signed a peace treaty with the French. However soon after the Indigenous people realised that the French were not to be staying temporarily but permanently, this resulted in Indigenous attacks on the French colonists.

On the 30th of May 1650 (or 1651) the French were informed of the Indigenous camp by an Indigenous man by the name of Thomas, who had joined the French side allegedly due to being rejected by Chief Duquesne’s daughter. The French then pursued the Indigenous people to the northernmost edge of the island. About forty Indigenous survivors including Kaïrouane made it to Leapers' Hill and with no other choice they jumped off, falling into the waters below.

The event at Leapers' Hill was a turning point in the colonisation of the island of Grenada, the remaining Indigenous people lived in isolated groups and eventually mixed in with the main Black population. The French had cleansed the island of most of the Indigenous people and the Indigenous culture.

== Modern Site ==
On the site is a small cross-shaped monument and there was also a museum on the site which has since closed, however the Grenada National trust is planning on reopening the site and having it as a tourist and educational attraction on the island.

== See also ==
- Grenada
- Kaïrouane
- Jacques Dyel du Parquet
- French Empire
- Sauteurs
