= Precolonial Saba =

The small Caribbean Island of Saba boasts a mere surface area of 13 km^{2} (5.0 sq mi). However, archaeological surveys and excavations, mainly by Leiden University between 1987 and 2006, have presented Saba as an integral part of the pre-Columbian island network in the Northeastern Caribbean. Archaeological finds from Saba include objects that were traded throughout the Caribbean, such as flint from Antigua, greenstone from St. Martin and pottery from the Greater Antilles. These examples indicate that pre-Columbian communities on Saba were not isolated but fully aware of communities and resources on other islands. Numerous archaeological sites have been uncovered on Saba, dating from around c. 1875 BC up until the point of European contact.

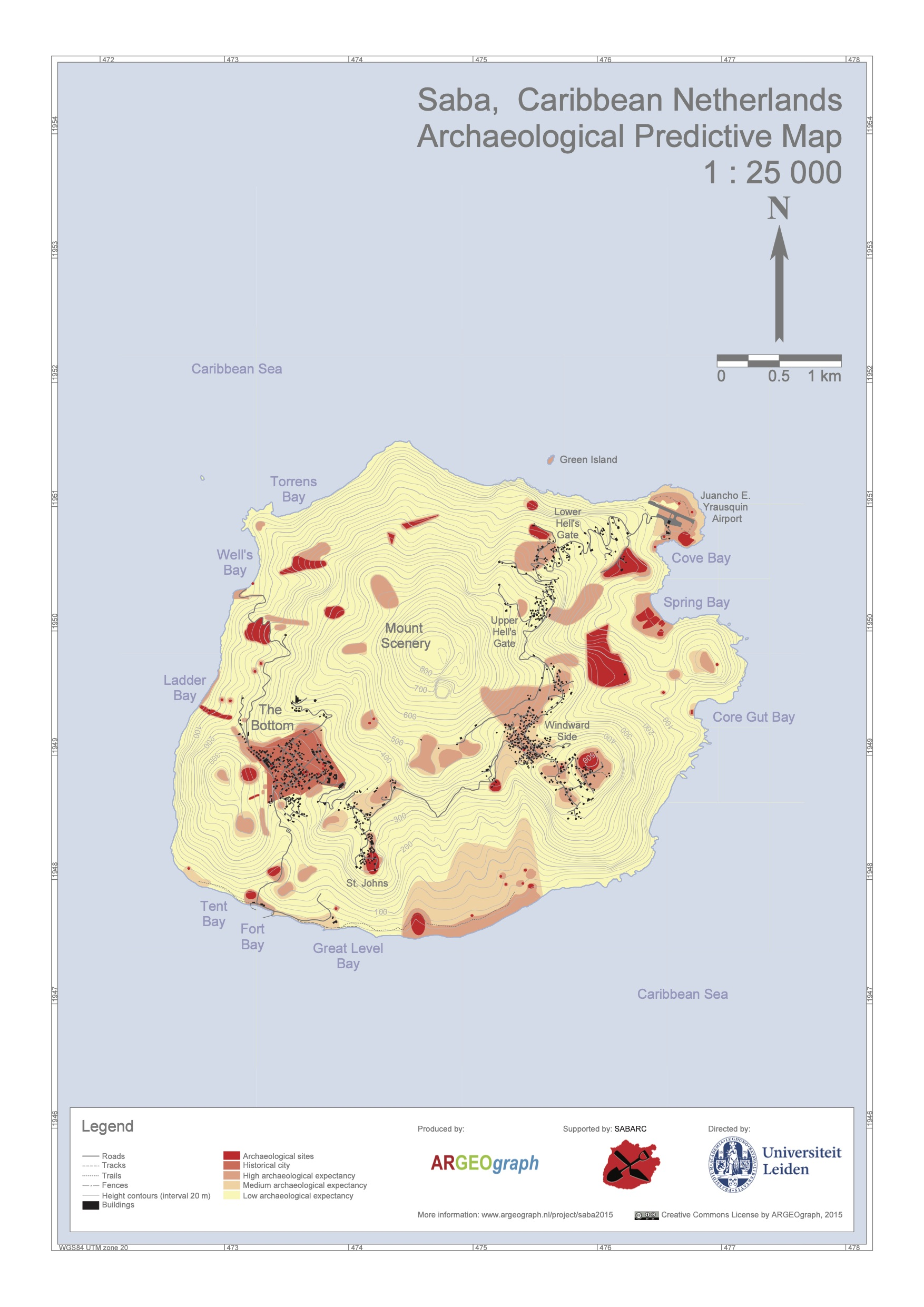
Saba Archaeological Predictive Map with pre-Columbian and historical site locations

== Saba in the precolonial context ==
=== Geography and climate ===
A period of droughts and high hurricane frequency characterised the entire Archaic Age (from 4300 BC until around 500 BC). This was then followed by a more humid period. Another drought laden period was recorded between AD 700 and 900. In general, climatic conditions were extremely variable during the Ceramic Age (from 500 BC onwards until European contact), with wet periods around AD 100, 400 to 600, and 1000 to 1400, and dry periods between AD 200 and 400, 700 and 900 and again around 1600.

There are nearly no flat surfaces on Saba, which has produced difficulties for cultivation and house construction. Furthermore, the locations for beaching boats on the island is very limited. This may have also caused difficulties for fisherman and traders during pre-Columbian times.

=== Settlement ===
Over 20 pre-Columbian sites have been found in Saba. The main occupation in Saba seems to have occurred between AD 400 and 1450. During this time the inhabitants of Saba were full horticulturalists living from the cultivation of root crops and the exploitation of the marine environment. They produced pottery vessels, made tools and sculptured objects from stone, shell, animal, bone, and coral.

Three different pre-Columbian settlement locations have been identified for Saba. The first is the inland location at an altitude between 140 and 400 m. Most of the sites that fall under this category are situated on a saddle between the lower slope of Mount Scenery and a volcanic dome. This site location offers strategic advantages, such as a good overview of the sea and natural protection against hostile groups. The second type is the coastal location. Sites of this kind can be found either at the lower end of a ravine or in a basin. However, the lower part of a ravine offers a restricted surface area and it is thus assumed that sites of this type were not used for living purposes but had other functions. For example, such as landing places for canoes. The possibility for beaching boats is very limited on Saba, which means that ravines in close proximity to the sea will likely have been used for canoe landing places. The third settlement type is the mountainous location. Observations have shown that small sites in the hills existed, which were used as seasonal shelters. Many isolated stone tools have been found at these locations.

Indigenous people most likely first set foot on Saba around 1875 BC. On the basis of the navigational skills required, South America seems to have offered the most favourable conditions for reaching Lesser Antillean islands such as Saba.

== Major Amerindian sites on Saba ==
=== Plum Piece ===
To date Plum Piece is one of the oldest known Archaic Age sites of Saba dating to around 1875–1520 BC. The site is located in the northwestern part of Saba, at an elevation of about 400 m (1,300 ft) above sea level. In contrast to most archaeological sites on Saba, Plum Piece is not situated near the coast. Plum Piece overlooks the cliffs at Mary's Point and thus provides a good view of Well's Bay and the ocean. An initial survey by Corinne Hofman and Menno Hoogland of Leiden University in 2001 confirmed the presence of occupation in the form of numerous pieces of flint and stone and shell tools that were recovered from the site's surface. Many shallow postholes suggest that the area was intensively used as a seasonal campsite. Excavations discovered that the people who dwelled here relied heavily on terrestrial resources, notably the black crab (Gecarcinus ruricola) and Sargasso shearwater (Puffinus Iherminieri Iherminieri). The evidence from Plum Piece suggests that the site was used for specific activities like woodworking or the building of canoes in the spring season between February and July. This also coincides with the nesting season of the Sargasso shearwater and the spawning of black crabs. It is likely that Plum Piece was visited in alternation with comparable campsites on nearby islands in a yearly mobility cycle determined by the availability of resources.

=== The Bottom ===
The Bottom site is located in the eastern part of the village The Bottom, which is situated in a bowl-shaped area, enclosed by Mount Scenery and a chain of lava domes at an elevation of 240 m above sea level. The site has been dated between c. AD 800 and 1200. The Bottom has good access to soils, which are suitable for horticulture, as well as to tropical forest resources. Finds from this site include pottery fragments, shell and bone fragments, stone and shell tools and some faunal remains. Pottery of the Mamoran Troumassoid subseries from this site is similar to pottery found at the Sandy Hill site on Anguilla, further highlighting interconnectivity between Caribbean Islands.

=== Spring Bay ===
Three pre-Columbian sites were found in close proximity to each other and labelled Spring Bay 1, 2 and 3. Spring Bay 1 is located in the middle of a basin and bounded by a rocky ridge in the southeast and Spring Bay Gut in the northwest. Within the deposits (or middens) that were uncovered during the excavations at Spring Bay 1, numerous discarded artefacts and food remains were found. The artefacts include pottery and stone, shell, coral and bone tools, ornaments such as beads and amulets and ceremonial paraphernalia in the form of three-pointed-objects, referred to as zemis. By analysing pottery three successive habitation periods were identified within the Spring Bay 1 site: Spring Bay 1a (400–600), 1b (800–1200) and 1c (1300–1450). One burial was found at Spring Bay 1: the inhumation of a small child, buried in the midden deposit. The site of Spring Bay 2 is located in close proximity of Well's Gut, an area exposed to severe marine erosion. The site has been dated to 800–1200. Mamoran Troumassoid pottery, spindle whorls, shell and stone tools, a stone bead and flint and flake artefact were recovered from the site. Furthermore, the site was located close to a spring, which suggests this site may have been associated with special activities such as collecting freshwater and the cleaning of cooking utensils. There seems to have been no connection between the Spring Bay 2 and Spring Bay 1 and 3 sites. Spring Bay 3 was found ca. 75 m from the mouth of Well's Gut. The site lies on an alluvial sediment, which is typical for the lower reaches of a gully. Excavations determined that the site formed a small-scale refuse disposal area. The site was dated between AD 800 and 1200. Finds from this site were very similar to Spring Bay 1, such as spindle whorls, stone tools, flint and flake artefacts, coral artefacts, beads and two small threepointers or zemis.

=== Kelbey's Ridge ===
Kelbey's Ridge is situated at an elevation of 140 m above sea level and consists of level terrain measuring 0.9 ha. According to local information the area is suitable for the cultivation of sweet potatoes and other root crops. A 1988 survey by Leiden University revealed a distribution of pre-Columbian artefacts in two scatters. The two scatters were identified as two different sites: Kelbey's Ridge 1 and 2. Kelbey's Ridge 1 has been dated between AD 400 and 600. A patterned distribution of artefacts and subsistence remains were uncovered. Saladoid pottery fragments were found all over the site, while subsistence remains, primarily consisting of the exoskeletons of land crabs and shell, were concentrated in the northeastern part of the site. Other finds from the site included stone tools, flint and flaked artefacts, faunal remains and one zemi made of coral.

Kelbey's Ridge 2 has been dated between 1300–1500 and its location will have provided pre-Columbian people with access to a variety of resources. In close proximity, c. 300 m, from the site, marine resources will most likely have been exploited. Furthermore, occupants of the site were in close proximity to the rainforest on the higher slopes, providing access to various plants, birds and small mammals. At the site 562 features were documented of which 230 appeared to be natural. The remaining features included oval-shaped pits (114), postholes (180), burials (7), hearths (4) and other features (5).

Seven hut plans have been reconstructed, with diameters varying from 8.5 to 9.5 m and an average surface area of about 63 m^{2} (680 sq ft). Inside the hut plans several patches of consolidated gravel were found, evidencing ramped hut floors. Two huts have been interpreted as cooking huts, while another was determined to have been used for storage purposes. Four hearths were found in the southeastern part of the site. Seven burials, including ten individuals were found in the central part of the site. These individuals were buried within the floor plans of the houses. Both inhumations and cremations occurred. All inhumations were characterised by the deceased being placed in a flexed, nearly seated position. The majority of the burials show evidence of being left open for a certain period of time. Burial gifts were not common. The five single burials are of one adult female, one c. 3-year-old child, two 12-year-old children and one 5-year-old child and a cranium of a 3-year-old child. A further burial consists of the cremated skeleton of a 5-year-old child placed in the burial of a 50-year-old male adult. Two other composite burials were uncovered. One yielded the skeletons of a 55- to 60-year-old female and infant aged 1–6 months. The two individuals were not buried simultaneously as the adult's skeletal remains are slightly disturbed. The second composite burial also consists of two stages. First, the adult male was buried in a tightly flexed position, after which the cremated remains of the bones of two children were placed in the chest cavity of the male. Finds from the site include Chican Osotionoid pottery, spindle whorls, stone implements, flint and flake tools, shell and coral artefacts, beads and pendants, zemis made of coral and a snuff inhaler made of manatee bone. It seems likely that the site was divided between a number of households, with each household occupying one house compound. A house compound consisted of one or more dwellings and a domestic area with fireplaces and a cooking hut. The occupation of the site lasted at most about 50 years. During this period the site was occupied by four or five households simultaneously.

== Saba's interconnectivity with other Caribbean islands ==
Due to its volcanic mountainous geology, Saba has very few level surfaces. This will have made it difficult for precolonial people to create large settlements or agricultural fields. Also, many terrestrial resources that were available on other islands were absent on Saba. Hence, the sea and the interconnectivity with other islands will have been vital for the precolonial inhabitants of Saba.

Based on archaeological evidence Amerindian groups started settling smaller islands in the Lesser Antilles by around 2900 BCE. It is likely that soon after the initial colonisation, communities from different islands managed extensive subsistence/resource/activity systems, guided by seasonality in order to exploit resources from numerous islands. For example, the search for high quality flint may have been one impetus for movement for many groups in the Lesser Antilles. Flinty Bay on Antigua, is one of the best sources of flint for this region and flint from this area has been found in precolonial contexts from the majority of islands in the Lesser Antilles. The superiority in quality of Long Island flint compared to flint from other Caribbean Islands was an important reason why flint from this location was so widely distributed in the Lesser Antilles. The excavation at Plum Piece has yielded pre-worked flint cores and flakes from Antigua, further supporting the notion of large-scale connectivity between the Caribbean Islands in the Lesser Antilles. The availability of high quality wood to build canoes could be another reason why people visited the island during certain parts of the year. Furthermore, waste products from Lobatus gigas shells have been found at Plum Piece. It is likely that these conch shells were brought in, for example from St. Martin, before they arrived at the Plum Piece site where they were further manufactured for various uses. Greenstone from St. Martin was also found in Saba. These fine-grained stones, generally grey-green in colour, were primarily used in the manufacture of axes. This find makes Saba the most southerly distributor of St. Martin greenstone while also being the most northerly distributor of Long Island flint during the Ceramic Age. A provenance analysis of clay found that apart from using local clay from Saba, inhabitants also made use of clay from the nearby islands of St. Eustatius, St. Martin and Anguilla. The only documented case of cremation in the Lesser Antilles stems from the Kelbey's Ridge 2 site, suggesting that a connection to the Greater Antilles existed, where cremations were more common. Burial goods from Saba such as a finely crafted fish-shaped snuff inhaler and hollow avian bones that could have been inserted into the inhaler are comparable to similar paraphernalia from islands in the Greater and Lesser Antilles.

Connections between Saba and other Caribbean Islands will have continued over the centuries. For the Kelbey's Ridge 2 site on Saba an ego-network analysis was carried out, which sought to analyse the direct social relations that the people who lived at this site engaged in. It was identified that Kelbey's Ridge 2, and by extent Saba held (and still holds today) a pivotal geographic position in connecting the people of the Greater Antilles with the people of the Leeward Islands. It was also discovered that apart from being a highly connected point of departure, Saba is also located on the majority of the shortest paths across the archipelago. This description depicts Saba as a strategically located island in the Northeastern Caribbean. The Kelbey's Ridge 2 site confirms this image. Its assemblage shows that a small community in a relatively marginal environment was effected by and had at least some influence on networks stretching across the Northeastern Caribbean. The fourteenth-century Northern Lesser Antilles was comparable to a frontier zone, in which autonomous communities participated freely in interregional exchange networks of goods and services.
