= Bataka =

- Location in Dominica
- Coordinates: 15°30′N 61°16′W
- Country: Dominica
- Parish: Saint David Parish
- Time zone: UTC-4 (UTC)

Bataka is a small town in Dominica. It is located in the northeast of the island, between Pagua Bay and Salybia.

The population of the village was described as "about 200" in 1956.
