= Working Group on Indigenous Populations =

Former United Nations working group

The Working Group on Indigenous Populations (WGIP) was a subsidiary body within the structure of the United Nations. It was established in 1982, and was one of the six working groups overseen by the Sub-Commission on the Promotion and Protection of Human Rights, the main subsidiary body of the United Nations Commission on Human Rights (defunct 2006).

The WGIP had the following mandate:

- to review developments pertaining to the promotion and protection of human rights and fundamental freedoms of indigenous peoples;
- to give attention to the evolution of international standards concerning indigenous rights.

Following the establishment of the United Nations Human Rights Council, the role of the Working Group, which was a substructure of the disbanded United Nations Commission on Human Rights came under review. Some governments argued, that the working group duplicated the work of the United Nations Permanent Forum on Indigenous Issues (UNPFII) and should therefore be discontinued, while indigenous peoples and NGOs pointed out that the UNPFII is not a human rights body and that the Working Group is the only body within the United Nations system that specifically deals with standard-setting concerning the human rights of indigenous peoples.

Eventually, the working group was discontinued and replaced by the Expert Mechanism on the Rights of Indigenous Peoples, which held its first session in Geneva from 29 September to 3 October 2008.

== See also ==
- Declaration on the Rights of Indigenous Peoples
- Indigenous and Tribal Peoples Convention, 1989
- International Day of the World's Indigenous Peoples
