= Crayfish River (Dominica) =

River in Dominica

Coordinates: 15°30′N 61°16′W

The Crayfish River is a river in Dominica.

== See also ==
- List of rivers of Dominica
