= Friedrich August Körnicke =

German agronomist and botanist

Friedrich August Körnicke (29 January 1828 – 16 January 1908) was a German agronomist and botanist born in Pratau (now a part of Wittenberg, Saxony-Anhalt). He was the father of agricultural botanist Max Koernicke (1874–1955).

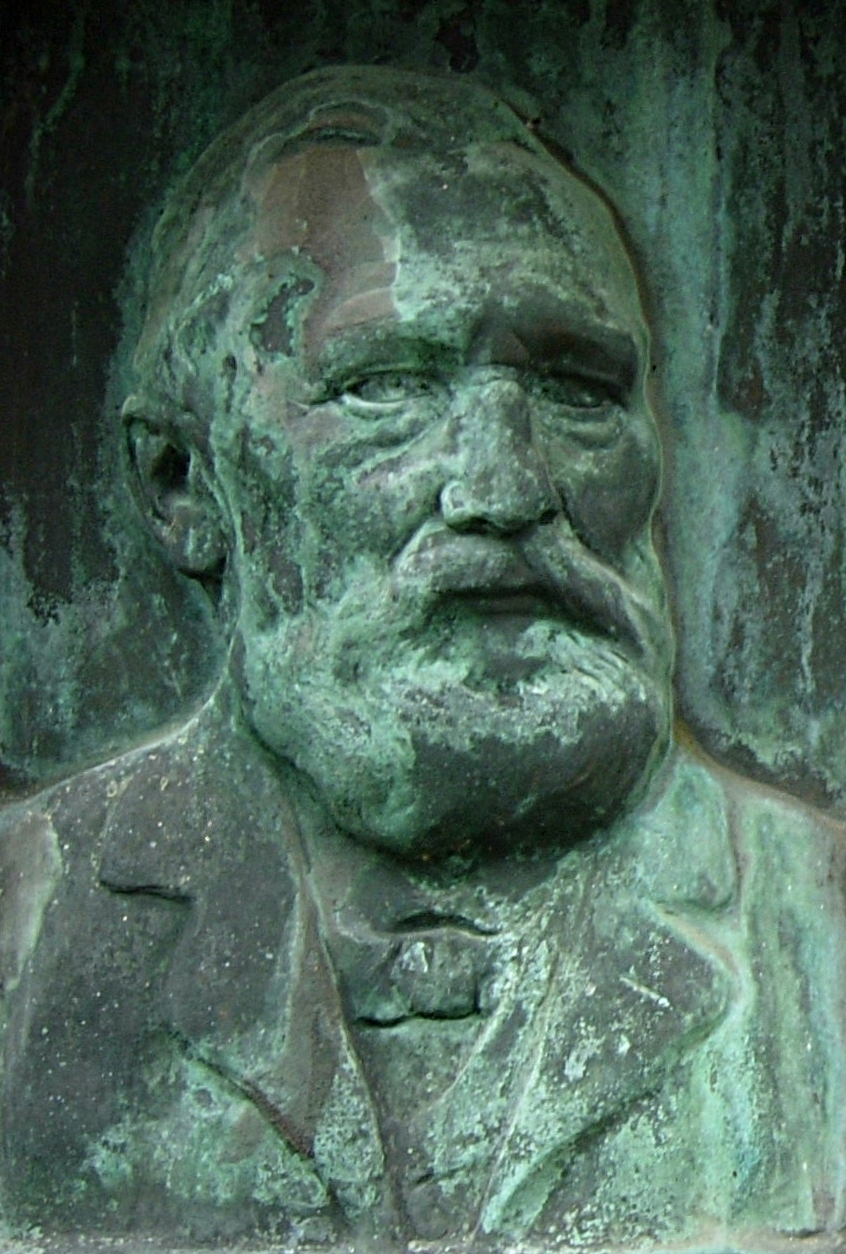
Bronze plaque of Körnicke at the Poppelsdorf cemetery in Bonn

Körnicke studied sciences at Humboldt University of Berlin, where in 1856 he earned his doctorate. As a student he participated in numerous botanical field trips, and at the university was influenced by distinguished botanists that included Alexander Braun (1805–1877) and Johannes von Hanstein (1822–1880). After graduation, he worked as curator of the herbarium at the botanical gardens in St. Petersburg.

From 1858 to 1867 he taught classes at the Landwirtschaftlichen Akademie Waldau (Waldau Agricultural Academy) near Königsberg. Afterwards he was successor to Julius Sachs (1832–1897) as professor of botany at the Agricultural Academy of Poppelsdorf in Bonn, a position he maintained until 1898.

Körnicke was a leading authority on cereal grains, especially wheat. At Bonn he conducted important investigations of agricultural crops, and performed systematic research involving improved varieties of grain. With agricultural scientist Hugo Werner (1839–1912), he published a landmark textbook on grain cultivation called "Handbuch des Getreidebaues".

In addition to his work in agricultural science, he performed significant studies of flora found in the Rhineland. Also, he was the taxonomic authority of many taxa within the botanical families Eriocaulaceae and Marantaceae.

== Selected publications ==
- Monographia scripta de Eriocaulaceae, 1856).
- Vegitation des zollvereinten und nördlichen Deutschlands, 1858.
- Zur Geschichte der Gartenbohne, 1885.
- Die Entstehung und das Verhalten neuer Getreidevarietäten, 1908.
