= Salybia =

Village on the east coast of Dominica

Coordinates: 15°29′25″N 61°15′13″W

Salybia or Salibia is a village on the east coast of Dominica in Saint David Parish. It is located to the south of Pagua Bay and north of the town of Castle Bruce. It is the main commercial and administrative centre for the Kalinago Territory, the only Indigenous people's reserve in the Caribbean.

The Salybia Bay is off the coast of Salybia, including a pair of islets called the Salybia Isles: Petit L'Ilet and Gros L'Ilet. According to Bradt Travel Guides, the Kalinago people tell that the islets were once ships that took the spirits of their dead to sea, and that they have an anchor laid in the sea floor.

The Salybia Mission Project, a nonprofit organization led by Ross University School of Medicine medical students, provides free medical services in the surrounding area.
