= Fort Young =

Fort Young may refer to:

- Fort Young, an 18th-century military fortress in Roseau, Dominica
- Fort Young Hotel, a 20th-century hotel in Roseau, Dominica
