= Fort Young Hotel =

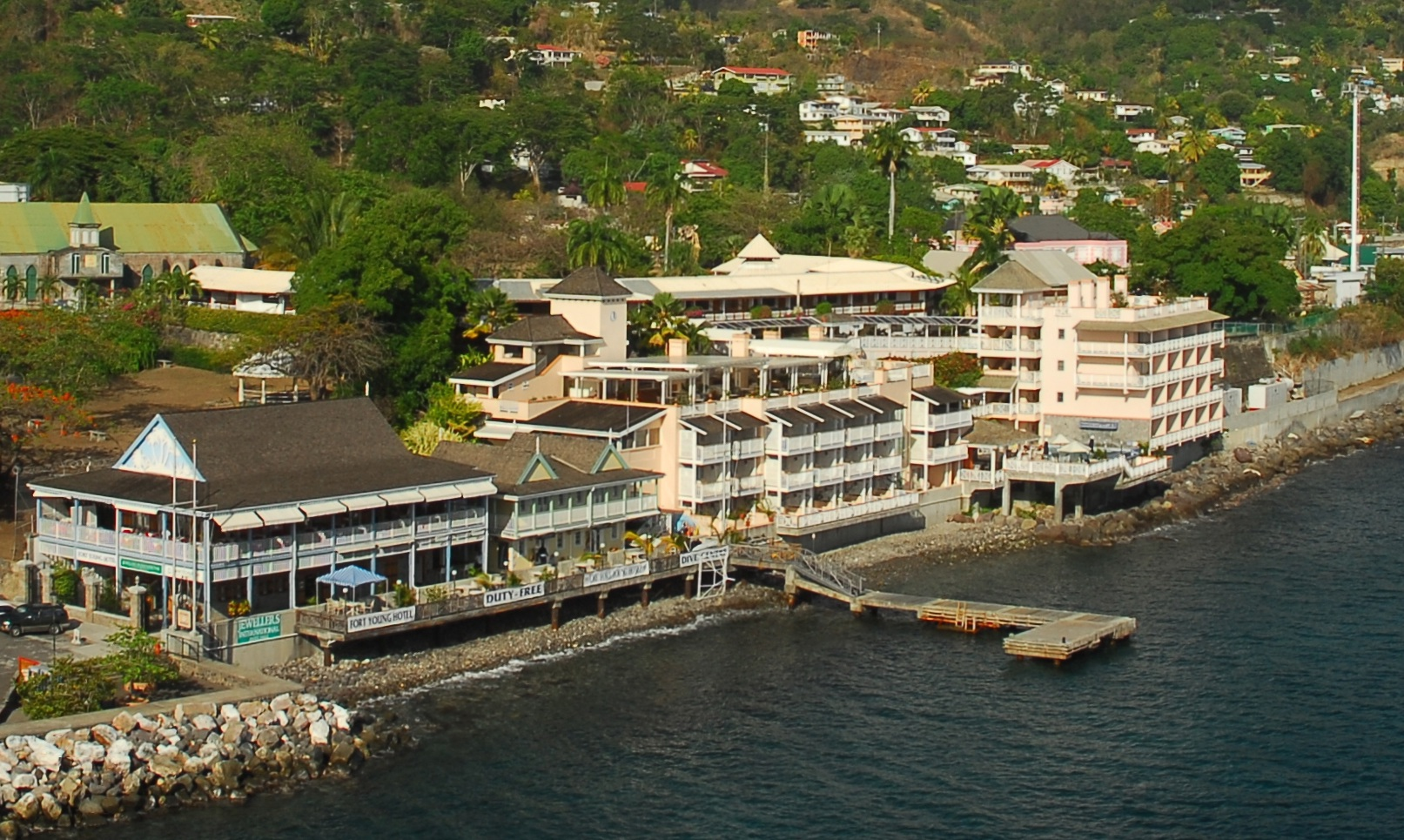

- Location within Dominica

General information
- Location: Dame Eugenia Charles Boulevard, Roseau, Dominica
- Coordinates: 15°17′44″N 61°23′11″W
- Inaugurated: 1964

Website
- Official site

Fort Young Hotel is a hotel on the quayside of Roseau, Dominica, in the southern part of the capital next to Garraway Hotel, Dominica Museum, the Roseau Public Library, just south of the Governor's Residence and Roseau Cathedral. Located within the ramparts of the old colonial military Fort Young of 1770s vintage and built in the backdrop of a quay overlooking the Caribbean Sea, the 71-room hotel was established in 1964 and hosts a diving centre.

== History ==
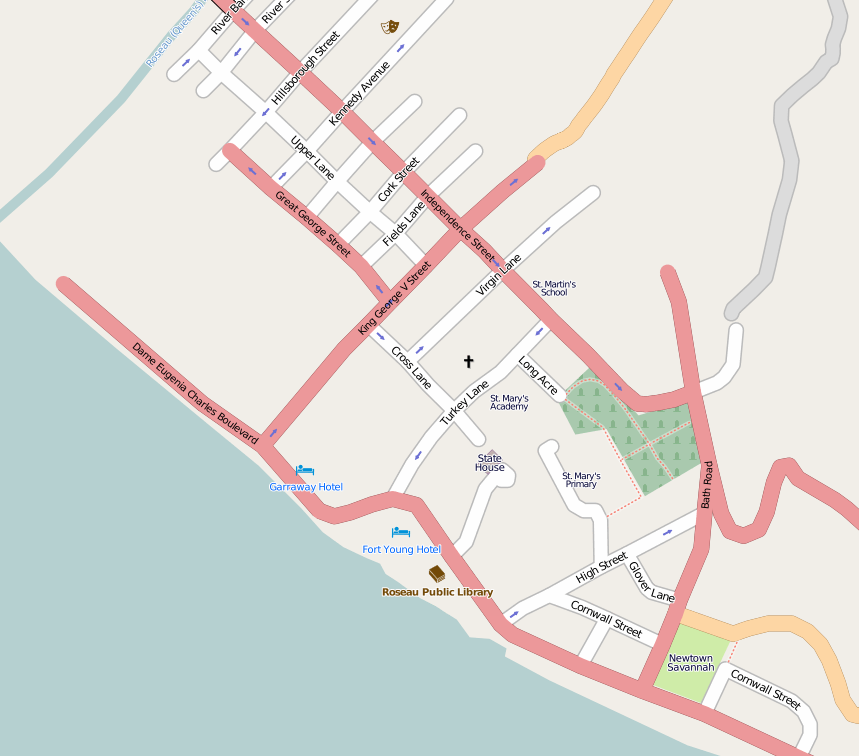
Map of southern Roseau. Click twice to enlarge.

The hotel location was once the Fort Young, the major military installation of Dominica, built in 1770 and named after the first British Governor, William Young, who ordered its construction during the American Independence War Years. In the late 19th century it was used as the headquarters of the Dominican police force. The fort became a hotel in 1964. In 1979, the devastating Hurricane David destroyed a significant part of the remains of the fort. The courtyard of the hotel retains the original flagstone walkways. Ruins of the old fort, however, still remain and cannons are located in the foyer and the courtyard at the entrance.

The hotel is often used as a venue for important regional and international conferences, such as the 41st meeting of the Organization of Eastern Caribbean States in June 2005. It has also hosted the Real Mas beauty contest, amongst many other events. In 2005 the hotel staff were crowned winners of the annual Kubuli Carib Canoe Race. In November 2007, the hotel passed management to Fazl Khan, a Sri Lankan national and is currently listed as a 3.5 diamond hotel.

== Architecture and facilities ==
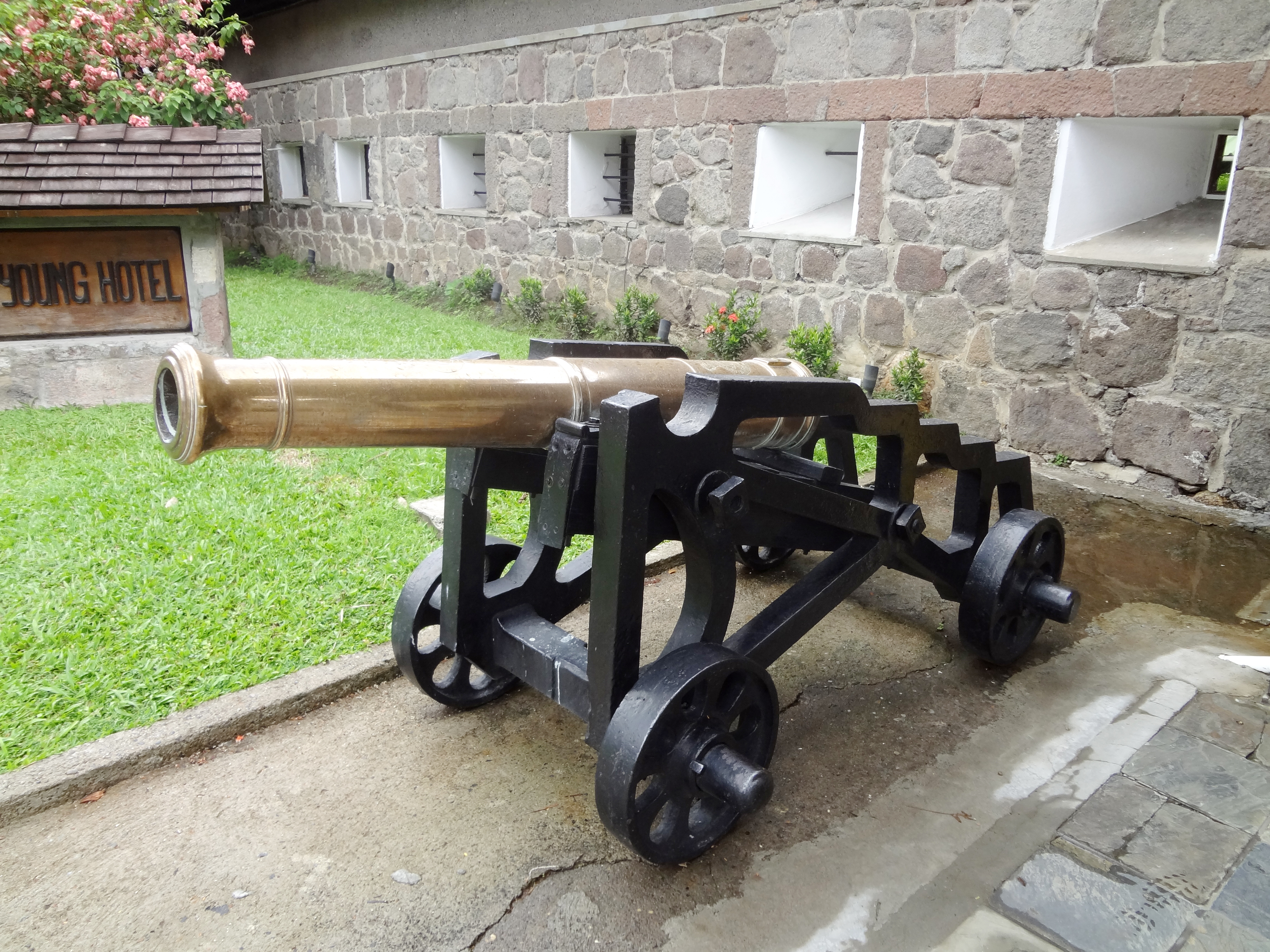
Cannon by the main entrance of the Fort Young Hotel

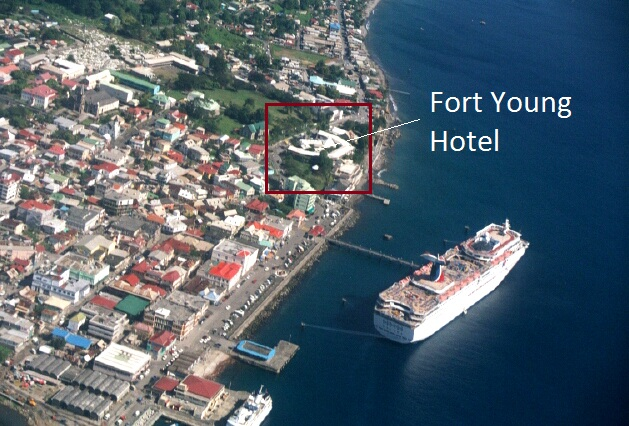
Aerial

As of 2011, the hotel has 71 rooms and suites, is the largest facility in Dominica Island. It is said to be built above the “mosquito line” in an otherwise mosquito infested area, with 18 ocean front rooms. The hotel exterior is painted in peach and cream

Typical rooms, as of 2011, feature square tile floors, pin-striped bed spreads and wooden closets and almost a Tibetan Buddhist-look saffron/mustard yellow and deep red/maroon design behind the beds, featuring mirrors. Some rooms differ in layout and design, but as of 2011 the colours of saffron and maroon are common throughout many of the rooms and throughout the hotel. The bathrooms contain oversized sunken baths. The swimming pool is sunk in the former parade grounds, overlooking the sea. Numerous cannons remain from the old fort, including two flanking the entrance, one in the lobby, and another in the courtyard. Indeed, the logo of the hotel features a cannon.

The hotel contains the Waterfront Restaurant, the Balas Bar & Courtyard, noted for its cocktails and the Boardwalk Cafe Bar, noted for its Friday night live music, including by the Fanatik band. As of 2011, the main restaurant is decorated with a peachy pink ceiling, pink table cloths, wooden floors and colonial style chairs, whilst the Boardwalk Cafe Bar is decorated in brown, tan, and olive-drab colours with a white ceiling and the Balas bar has wooden ceilings and floors, maroon table cloths and pin-striped chairs. The high beamed main dining room was originally a dormitory. The hotel hosts a diving centre on the quay, a private jetty and duty-free shopping.

The hotel was substantially refurbished in 2010-2011, at a cost of EC 1.5 million.
