= Sir William Young, 1st Baronet, of North Dean =

British colonial administrator and planter

Sir William Young Bt
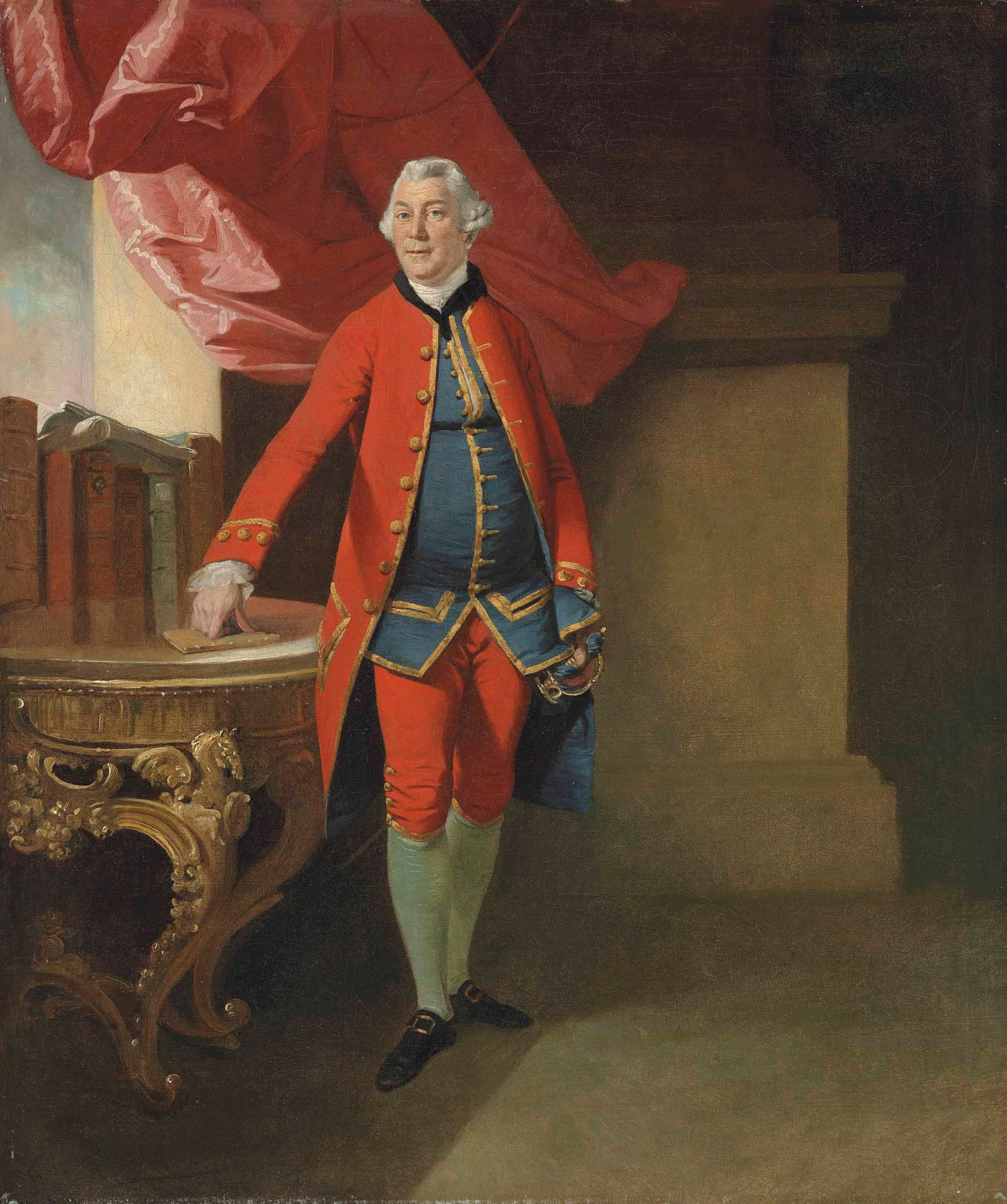
- Portrait by Agostino Brunias, 1770
- Born: 1724; Antigua, British West Indies
- Died: 1788 (aged 63–64)

Sir William Young, 1st Baronet (c. 1724 – c. 1788) was a British colonial administrator and planter. He served as President of the Commission for the Sale of Lands in the Ceded Islands, and was appointed the first non-military governor of Dominica in 1768.

== Early life ==
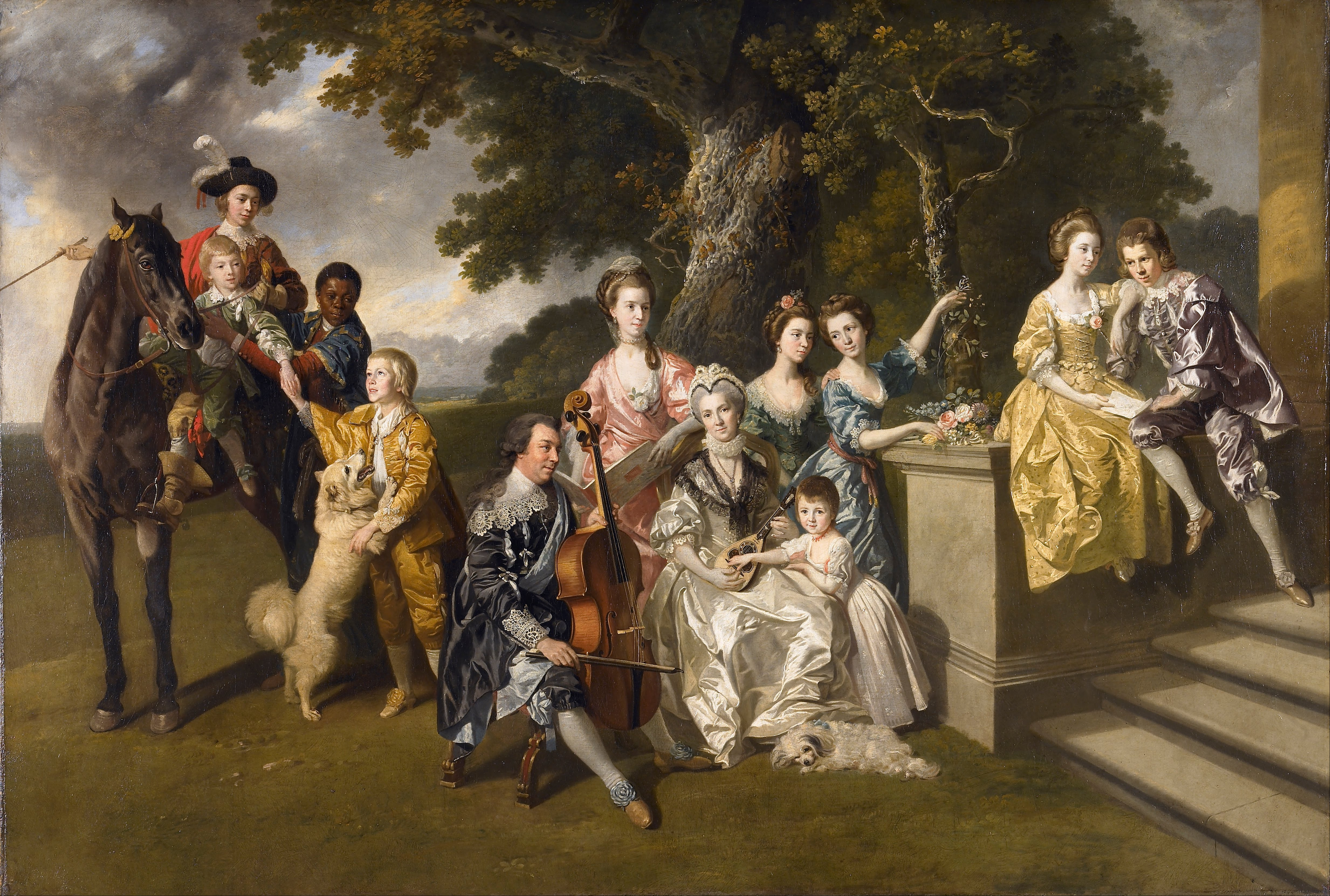
c. 1767 portrait of Young and his family by Johan Zoffany

William Young was born in the British colony of Antigua c. 1724. He was the son of William Young, a doctor who had fled from Scotland after the suppression of the Jacobite rising of 1715 as a result of his pro-Jacobite sympathies.

== Career ==
Young was elected a Fellow of the Royal Society in 1748, his candidature citation reading "Residing at Chalton near Canterbury, A Gentleman well versed in Natural and Experimental knowledge, and alwaies ready to promote whatever may tend to the Improvement of Arts and Sciences". He was the author of Considerations which may tend to promote the settlement of our new West-India colonies: by encouraging individuals to embark in the undertaking, published in 1764.

Early in 1764, Prime Minister George Grenville nominated Young and he was appointed in the same year to be President of the Commission for the Sale of Lands in the Ceded Islands. The islands included Grenada, Tobago, Dominica, and St Vincent, acquired from France as a result of the 1763 Peace of Paris. The commission was under instructions to create model colonies, which would learn from the success of others but which would avoid their problems of depleted fertility and environmental degradation. In late 1764, Young and his group sailed for Barbados, spending eight years away from his family during the period of 1764 to 1773, though in fact he made at least two return journeys in 1767 and 1770. James Harris reports on attending concerts at Young's residence in those years. Of particular note during this time, Young employed the artist Agostino Brunias to record Young's progress and the visual context of his Commission's work. Young was also a diarist and illustrator and documented his own time in the Caribbean islands. He recorded "110 voyages of a like nature performed in the course of nine years amongst the ceded islands on the service of the Commission for the sale of lands."

In 1768, Young was made Lieutenant Governor of Dominica. In 1769 he was made Baronet Young of North Dean. In 1770 he was chosen to be the first Governor of the new government, being sworn in on 17 November 1770. He was responsible for building the main military stronghold of Dominica in Roseau, Fort Young (now a hotel) in 1770 and for Government House, Dominica, his residence near the fort. He left Dominica in 1772, rushing to St Vincent to "assist with the Carib War" and to protect his estates there. Sir William Young was back in England at the end of 1773, and his office of Receiver and Governor ended, and it was concluded by his family that "the adventure in the ceded islands had proved so expensive and indeed ruinous" to him.

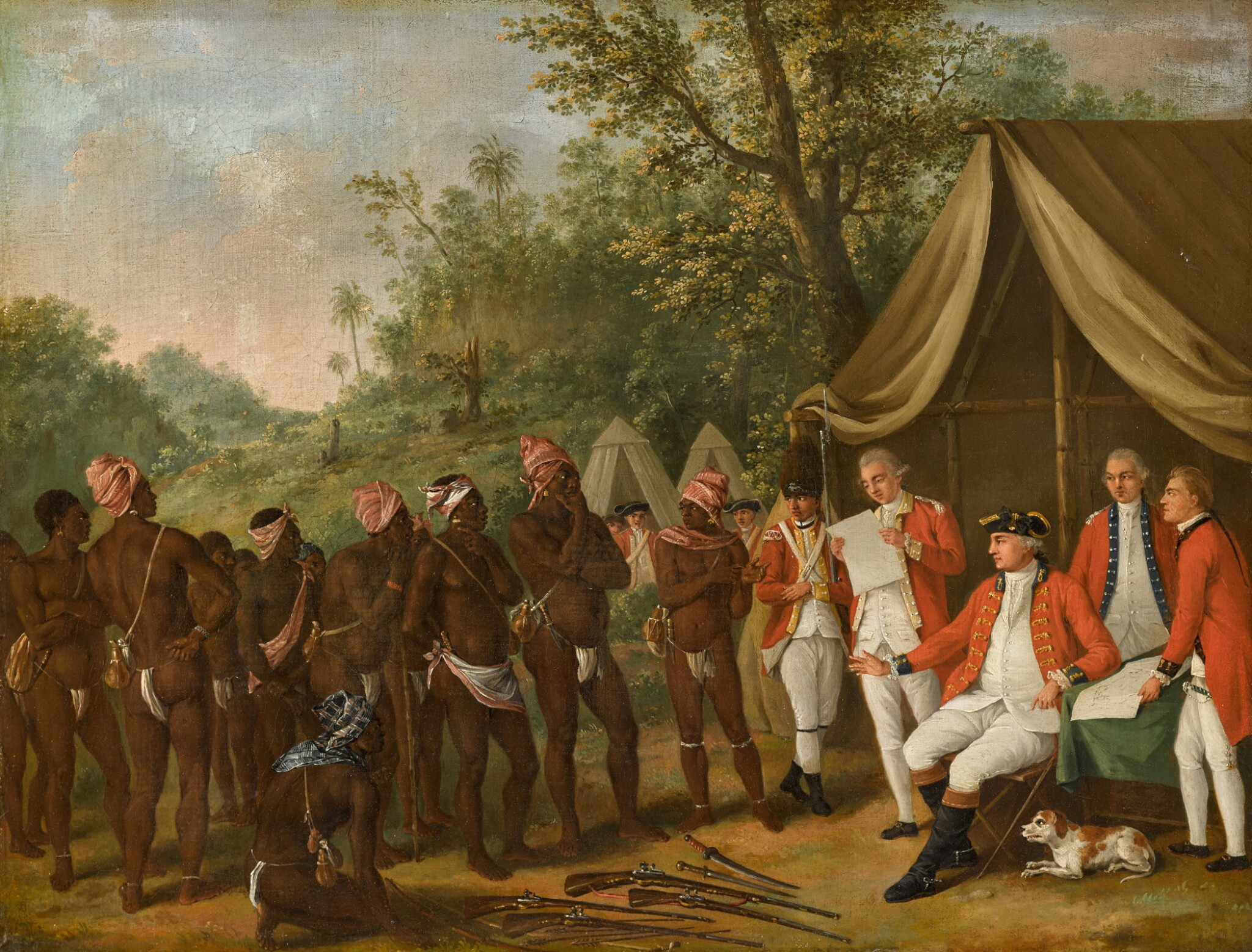
Young acting for the British Crown and the so-called Black Caribs of St Vincent signing the 1773 peace treaty

== Personal life ==
Young and his second wife, Elizabeth (1729–1801), the daughter of the mathematician Brook Taylor, had several children, including Sarah Elizabeth, William, Portia, Elizabeth, Mary, Henry, John, and Olivia. He and ten family members were featured in the oil painting, The Family of Sir William Young, Baronet (ca.1766) by Johann Zoffany. His eldest son, Sir William Young, 2nd Baronet (1749–1815), was the Governor of Tobago from 1807-1815 as well as serving as a Member of Parliament.

Sir William purchased some of the best pieces of real estate on Antigua, St Vincent, and Tobago. Despite this, he was seriously in debt and after his death in 1788 he left a debt of around £110,000 (£14,339,355 in 2025 pounds) for his first son to pay off. Sir William Young, 2nd Baronet also inherited four plantations and 896 slaves in the colonies at that time, but was unable to save them from bankruptcy.

== Legacy ==
Young Island in the Grenadines is named in his honour.

== See also ==
- Young baronets

Baronetage of Great Britain
New creation	Baronet (of North Dean); 1769 – 1788	Succeeded by William Young
