= Agostino Brunias =

Italian painter

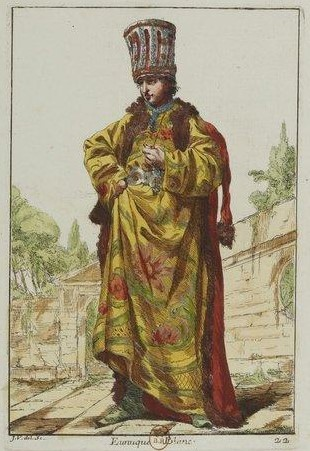
Brunias drawn as a eunuch by Joseph-Marie Vien for the masquerade of the students of the French Academy in Rome, 1748

Agostino Brunias (c. 1730 – 2 April 1796) was an Italian painter who was primarily active in the West Indies. Born in Rome around 1730, Brunias spent his early career as a painter after graduating from the Accademia di San Luca. After he befriended prominent Scottish architect Robert Adam and accompanied him back to Britain, Brunias left for the British West Indies to continue his career in painting under the tutelage of Sir William Young. Although he was primarily commissioned to paint the various planter families and their plantations in the West Indies, he also painted several scenes featuring free people of colour and cultural life in the West Indies. Brunias spent most of his West Indian career on the island of Dominica, where he would die in 1796. Historians have made disparate assessments of Brunias's works; some praised his subversive depiction of West Indian culture, while others claimed it romanticised the harshness of plantation life. Haitian revolutionary Toussaint Louverture was a prominent admirer of his work.

== Early life ==
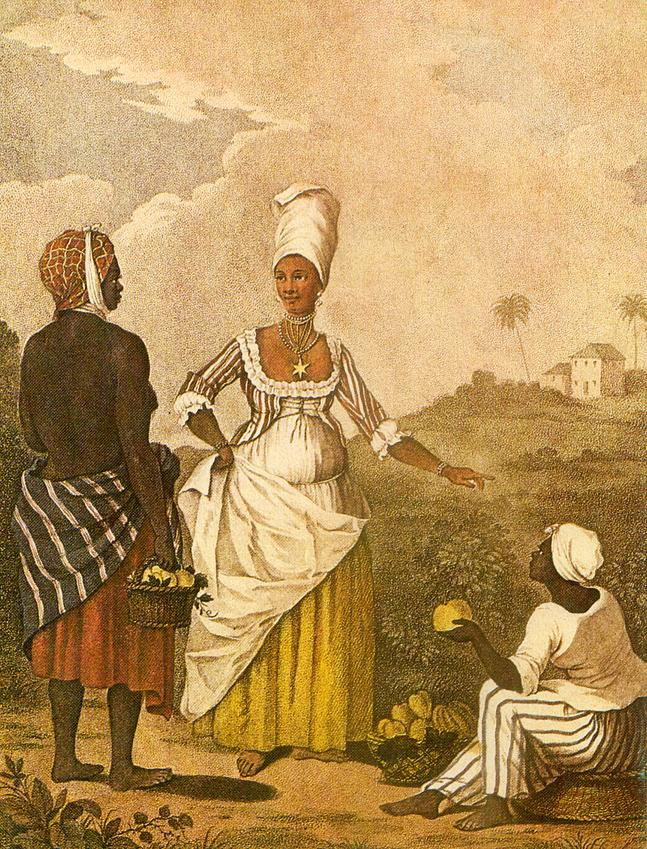
An engraving after an oil painting of Agostino Brunias titled Barbados Mulatto Girl.

Brunias was born in Rome c. 1730; the exact day and month of his birth is uncertain. His first name has been recorded in various ways, including Abraham, Alexander, August, or Austin, while his surname has been recorded as Brunais and Brunyas. He became a student at the Accademia di San Luca, one of the most prestigious art institutions in Rome. In 1752, he exhibited an oil painting, and in 1754 he won Third Prize in the Second Class for painting. Brunias met the prominent Scottish architect Robert Adam, who was on a Grand Tour studying the "magnificent ruins of Italy" between 1754 and 1756. Adams employed Brunias in his workshop in Rome, and Brunias accompanied Adams on his return to Britain in 1758. Brunias worked as a draughtsman and painter on many of Adam's building projects in Britain. Adam, praising his works, called Brunias a "bred painter". His murals and paintings covered the interior walls of several stately homes of the British upper class. Surviving examples of Brunias' early work include five paintings in the classical style, which were commissioned to decorate the breakfast room at Kedleston Hall, now housed at the Victoria and Albert Museum. By 1762, Brunias was residing in Broad Street, Carnaby Market, London and in 1763 and 1764, he exhibited at the Free Society of Artists.

== Career in the West Indies ==
At the end of 1764, Brunias left London for the British West Indies under the employ of Sir William Young. Young was at that time newly-appointed "President of the Commission for the Sale of Ceded Lands in Dominica, Saint Vincent, Grenada and Tobago", following the Treaty of Paris, where the French had ceded the territories in the Lesser Antilles to the British. Then in 1768 Sir William Young was appointed Lieutenant Governor of Dominica, and in 1770 Young was appointed Governor of Dominica. Brunias accompanied Young on his travels through the West Indies. The opportunity provided him with subject matter including indigenous Carib life and evolving 18th-century creole cultures. His first sketches of the West Indies were done in Bridgetown in 1765, one of which was turned into a popular engraving titled "Barbados Mulatto Girl." Following Sir William Young, Brunias settled in Dominica's capital, Roseau. From the West Indies, Brunias submitted two drawings to the Society of Artists' exhibition of 1770 in London. Governor Young remained Brunias' primary patron until 1773, when he returned home to Britain.

Brunias completed many sketches, watercolors, and oil paintings in the Caribbean. Like many artists working in the Americas, Brunias returned to Britain around 1775 in order to promote and sell his growing collection of work. In 1777 and 1779, three of his West Indian paintings were shown at the Royal Academy. He followed this accomplishment by publishing engravings of his West Indian paintings, some of which were "by his own hand". During this time he also created wall paintings of "Caribbean aborigines" for the antelibrary at Stowe House. During Brunias' absence from the West Indies, Dominica and St. Vincent were captured and occupied by the French; Britain did not regain the colonies until the Treaty of Versailles was signed in 1783. Brunias was finally able to return to Dominica in 1784, and remained there until his death on the island of Dominica in 1796. He returned to Dominica and St. Vincent with commissions, including one for a set of botanical drawings from Alexander Anderson, curator of the Saint Vincent and the Grenadines Botanic Gardens.

During the Haitian Revolution in the 1790s, Toussaint Louverture, Haitian revolutionary and one of Brunias' supporters, wore eighteen buttons on his waistcoat which were each decorated with a different hand-painted miniature reproduction of Brunias' West Indian scenes. Engravings of his designs continued to be published posthumously. Harvard University's Fogg Museum, Yale Center for British Art and Tate (London) own examples of his works. His work has also been acquired by the Victoria and Albert Museum, Cooper Hewitt, Smithsonian Design Museum, and The Brooklyn Museum.

== Artistic style and interpretations ==
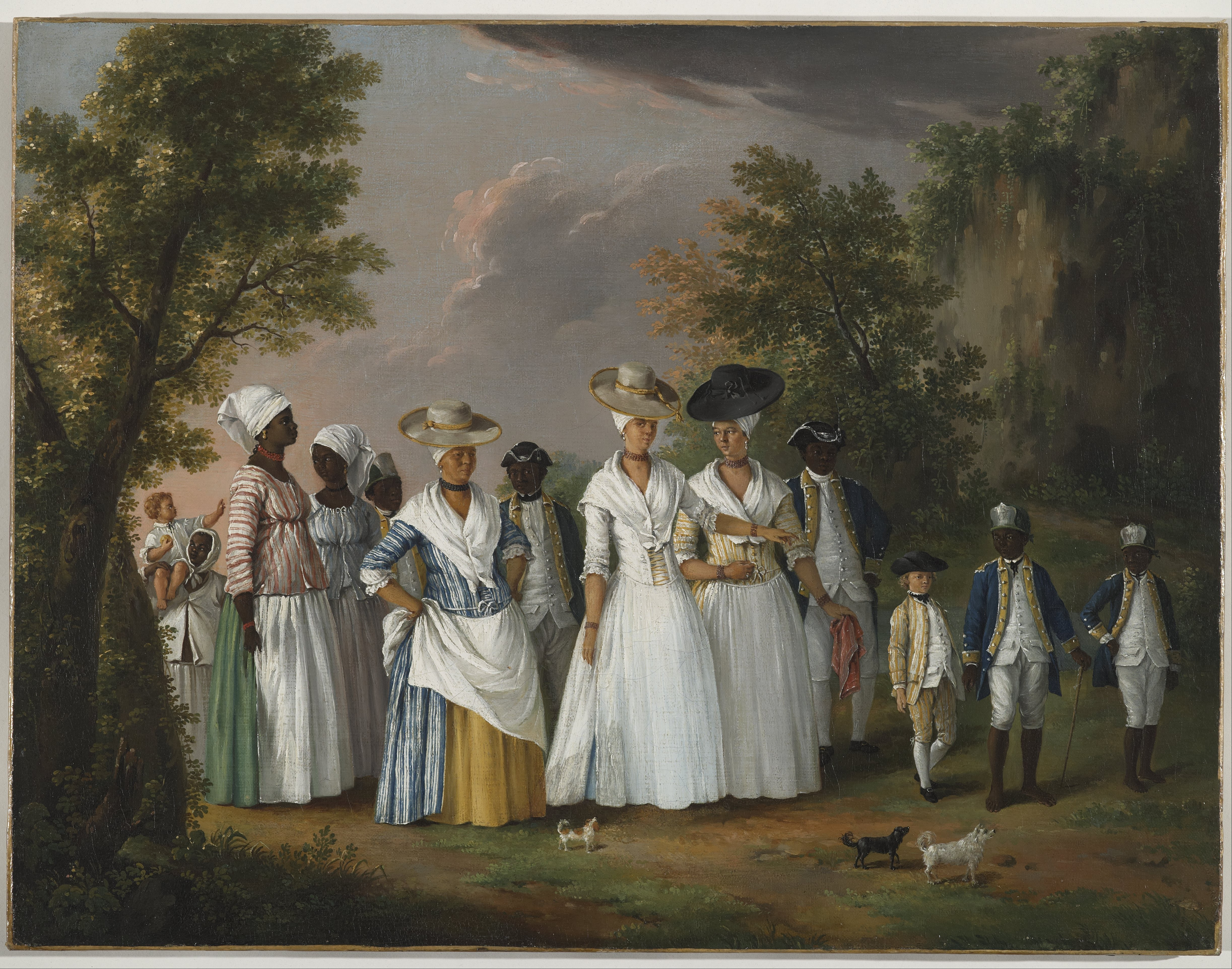
Free Women of Color with Their Children and Servants in a Landscape, ca. 1770-1796. Brooklyn Museum.

Brunias in his collected works is shown to be predominantly a figure painter, with strong classical influences. His association with Robert Adams in the 1760s places Brunias firmly within the early neoclassical, or first classic revival, movement in Britain. Although he occasionally painted landscapes and other subject matter, classically-influenced figures are the most common feature in his early work as well as in his later West Indian pieces. In 1808, artist and critic Edward Edwards summarized Brunias body of work as consisting of "decorative subjects for panels and ceilings, both in colours and chiaroscuro," and of West Indian subject matter.

His paintings of Dominica, St. Vincent, St. Kitts, and Barbados provide a valuable insight into life on these islands during the colonial period. His works depicts the influence of the diverse European, Caribbean, and African cultures prevalent in the 18th-century Caribbean. He was particularly adept at documenting 'Negro festivals', dances, markets, and other related cultural traditions, as well as showing the cultural customs of the indigenous Caribs. Brunias' sketches and paintings of Caribs have been noted by historians as being some of the best documented examples of indigenous Caribbean culture in 18th-century art. Brunias has also been noted by dress historians for his varied and diverse depictions of the styles of clothing worn by West Indians during the period.

Although Brunias was mainly commissioned to depict the families of white planters in his first years in the Caribbean, especially by his patron Sir William Young, his works soon assumed a subversive political role in the Caribbean. To many, Brunias' depictions of Caribbean life appeared to be endorsing a free West Indian society absent of slavery, and historians have noted his work as exposing the artificiality of racial hierarchies in the West Indies. For example, Free Women of Color with their Children and Servants in a Landscape (c. 1764–96), an oil painting on canvas, depicts free men and women of color as privileged and prosperous. Toussaint Louverture, the Haitian revolutionary, was also a patron of Brunias' work during the Haitian Revolution. This connection has been noted by historians of displaying the cultural bonds between West Indians throughout the Caribbean.

At the same time, several historians have argued that Brunias' images of communities of color romanticized and obscured the harsh realities of life on West Indian plantations. According to Dominican historian Lennox Honychurch, Brunias' engravings were used by historian and politician Bryan Edwards in books he wrote about the history of the West Indies. Edwards was a staunch proslavery activist and an opponent of abolitionism, and interpreted the Brunias engravings to support his argument that enslavement was a happy and humane condition.

== Personal life ==
Born in Italy and achieving success in Britain, Agostino Brunias spent more than twenty-five years in the West Indies, where he primarily resided in Dominica. He is also known to have lived in St. Vincent, and he spent time on Barbados, Grenada, St. Kitts, and Tobago.

He started a family in Rouseau, Dominica around 1774, shortly before he returned to Britain, and was then separated from them by the outbreak of the American War of Independence. From church records it seems that his children's mother was a "free mulatto woman" and that they had at least two children. After being reunited with his family after nearly ten years, he remained with them in Roseau until his death. Several historians have suggested that Brunias' identity as an Italian Catholic made him sympathetic to the diverse, creolized Catholic community that had formed under French colonial rule before 1763, and somewhat alienated him from the Protestant society of the British emigrant planters.

He died on 2 April 1796 at the age of 66, and was buried in the Catholic cemetery on the site of the present-day Roseau Cathedral.

== Gallery ==
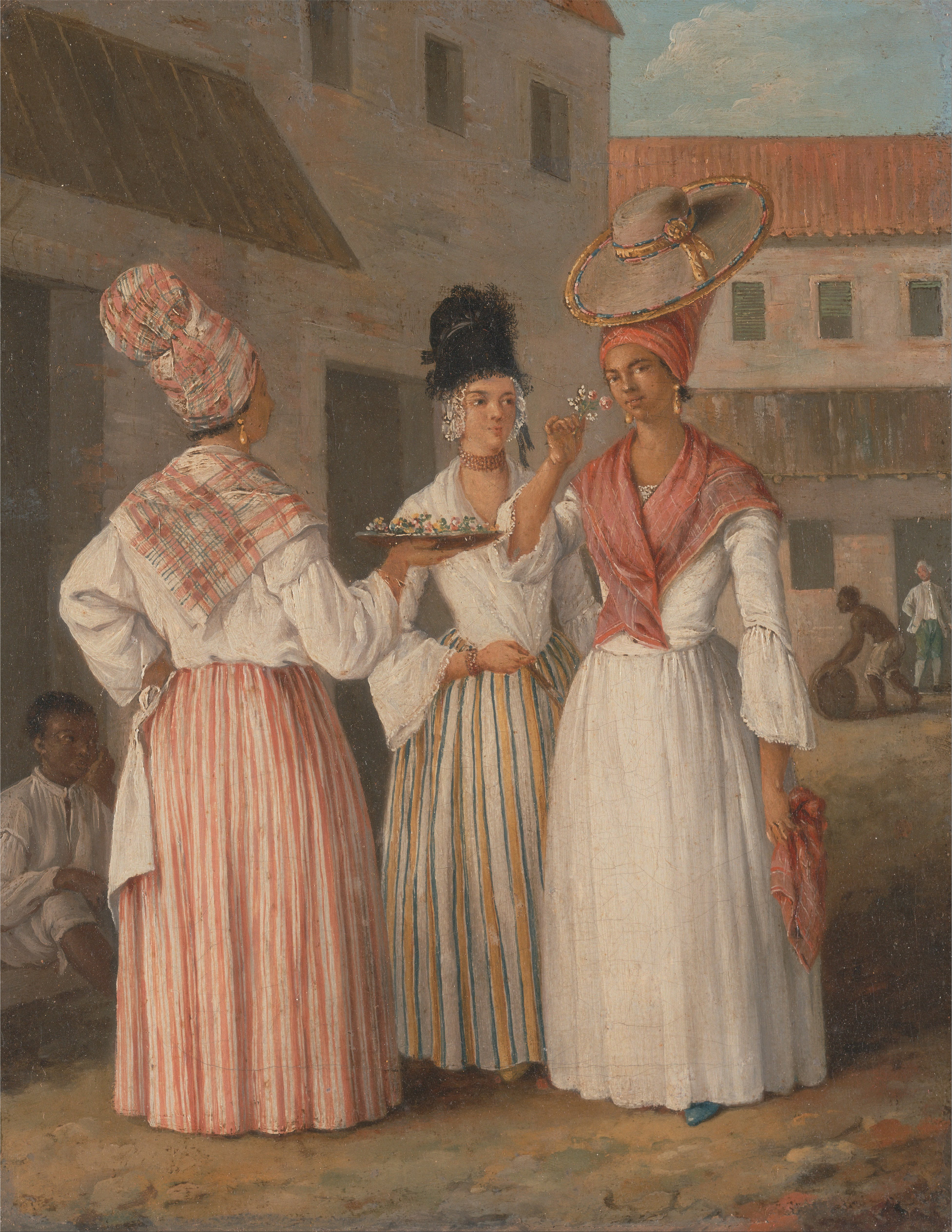
A West Indian Flower Girl and Two other Free Women of Color ca. 1769

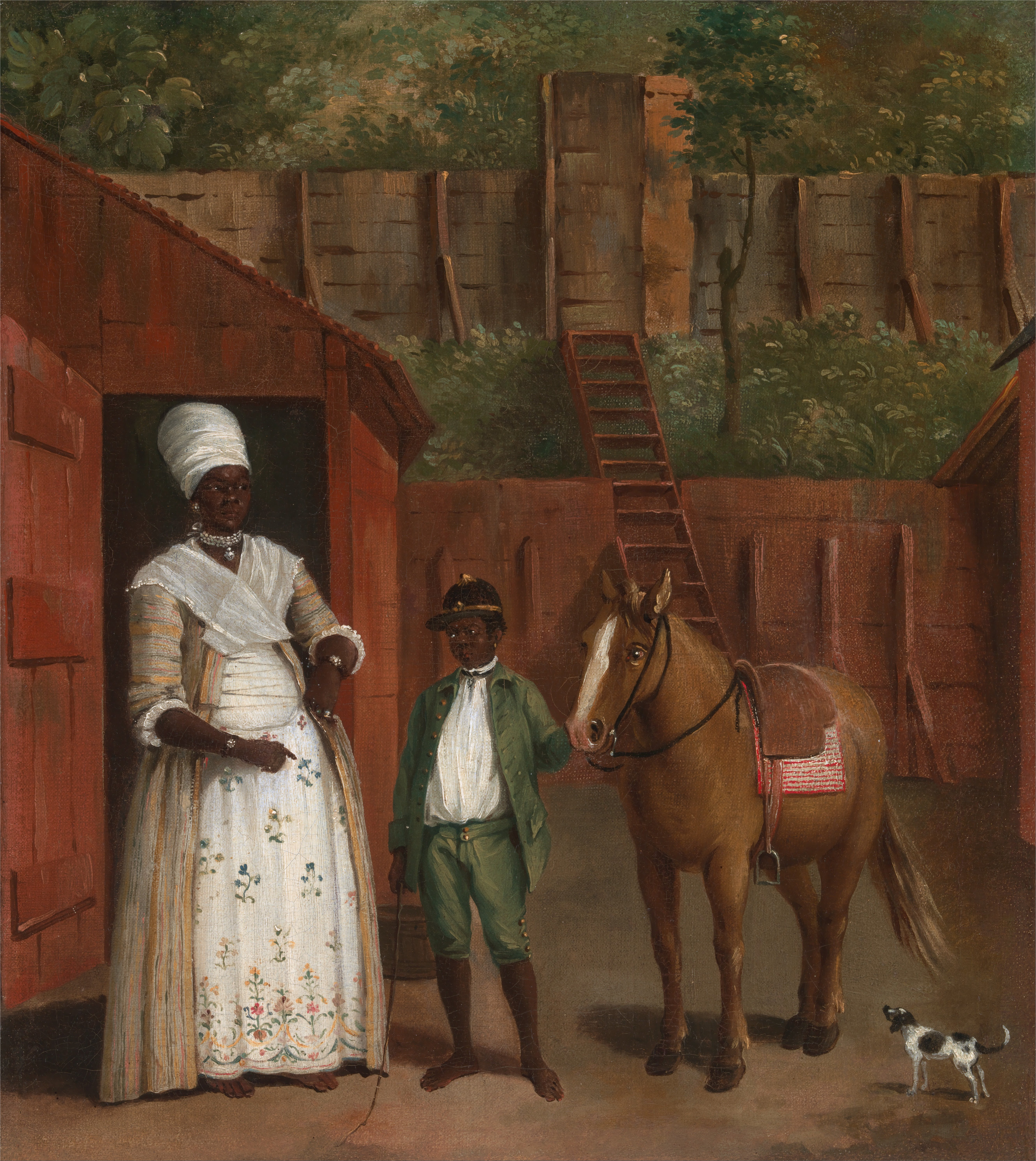
A Mother with her Son and a Pony ca. 1775

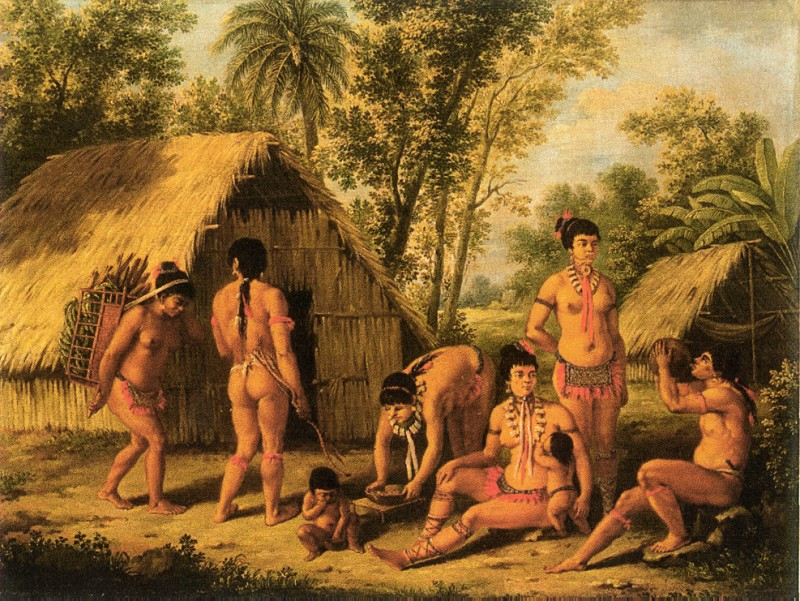
A Family of Carib natives drawn from life ca. 1765 - 1770s

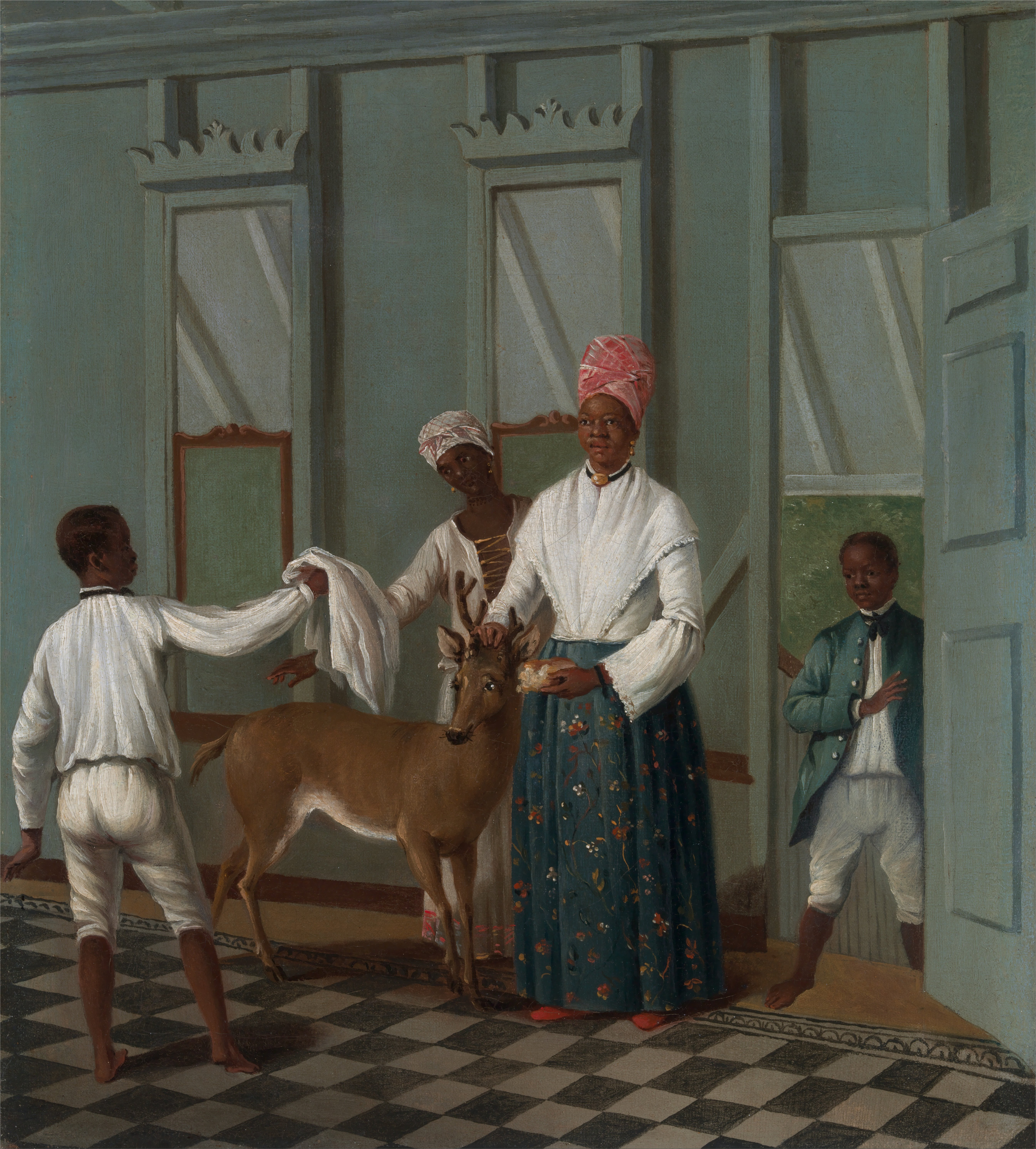
Servants washing a deer ca. 1775

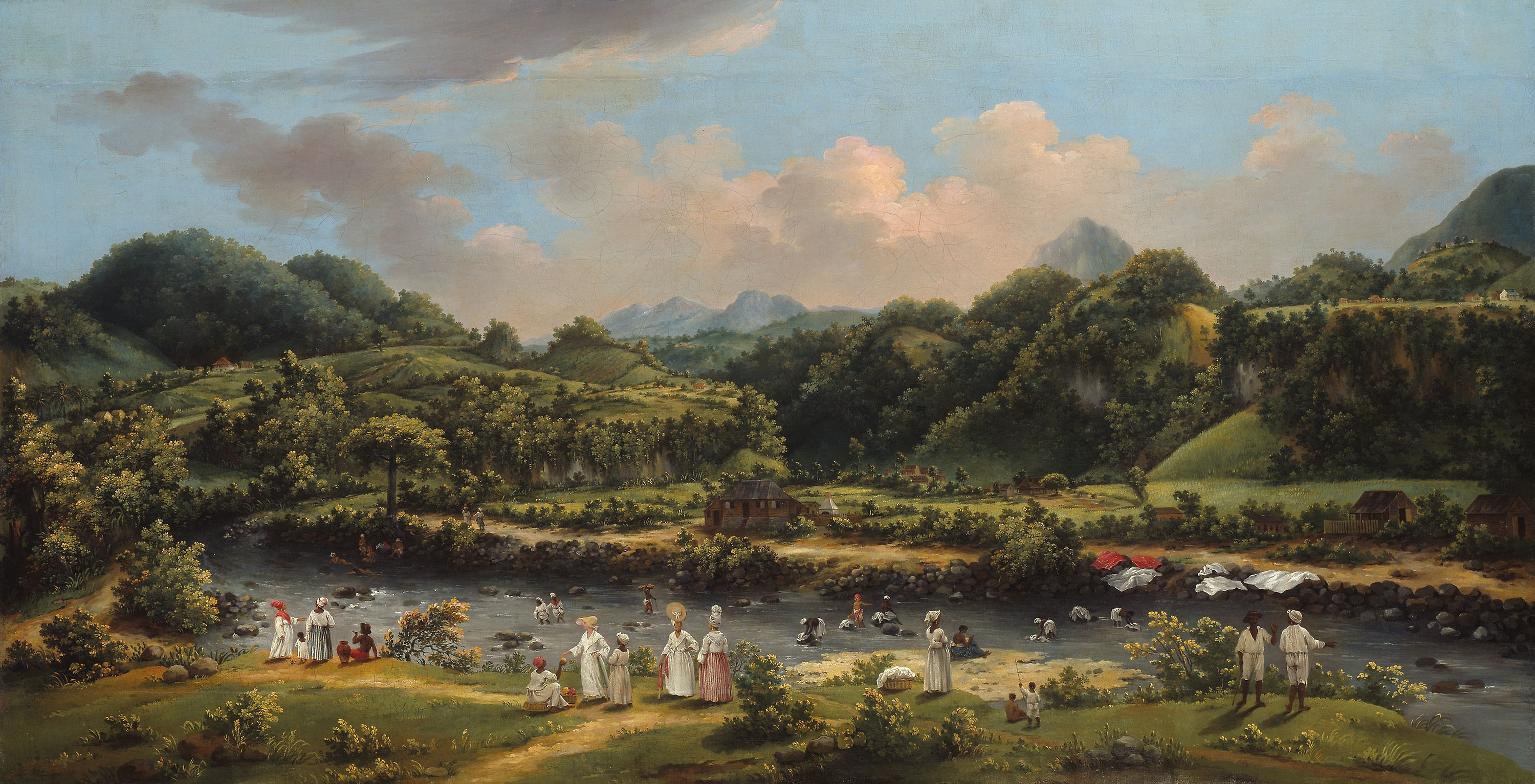
View on the River Roseau, Dominica c. 1770-1780

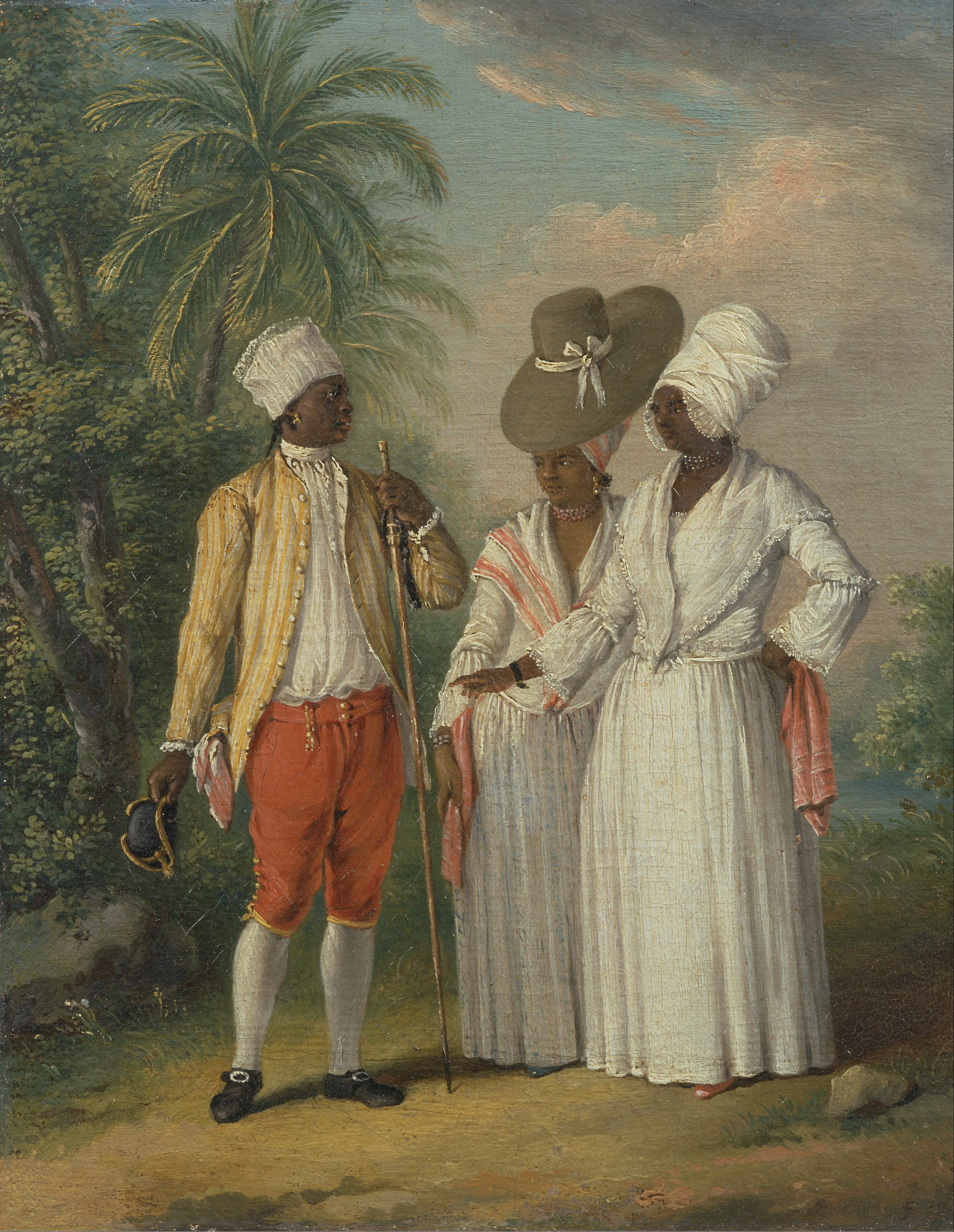
Free West Indians of Dominica ca. 1770

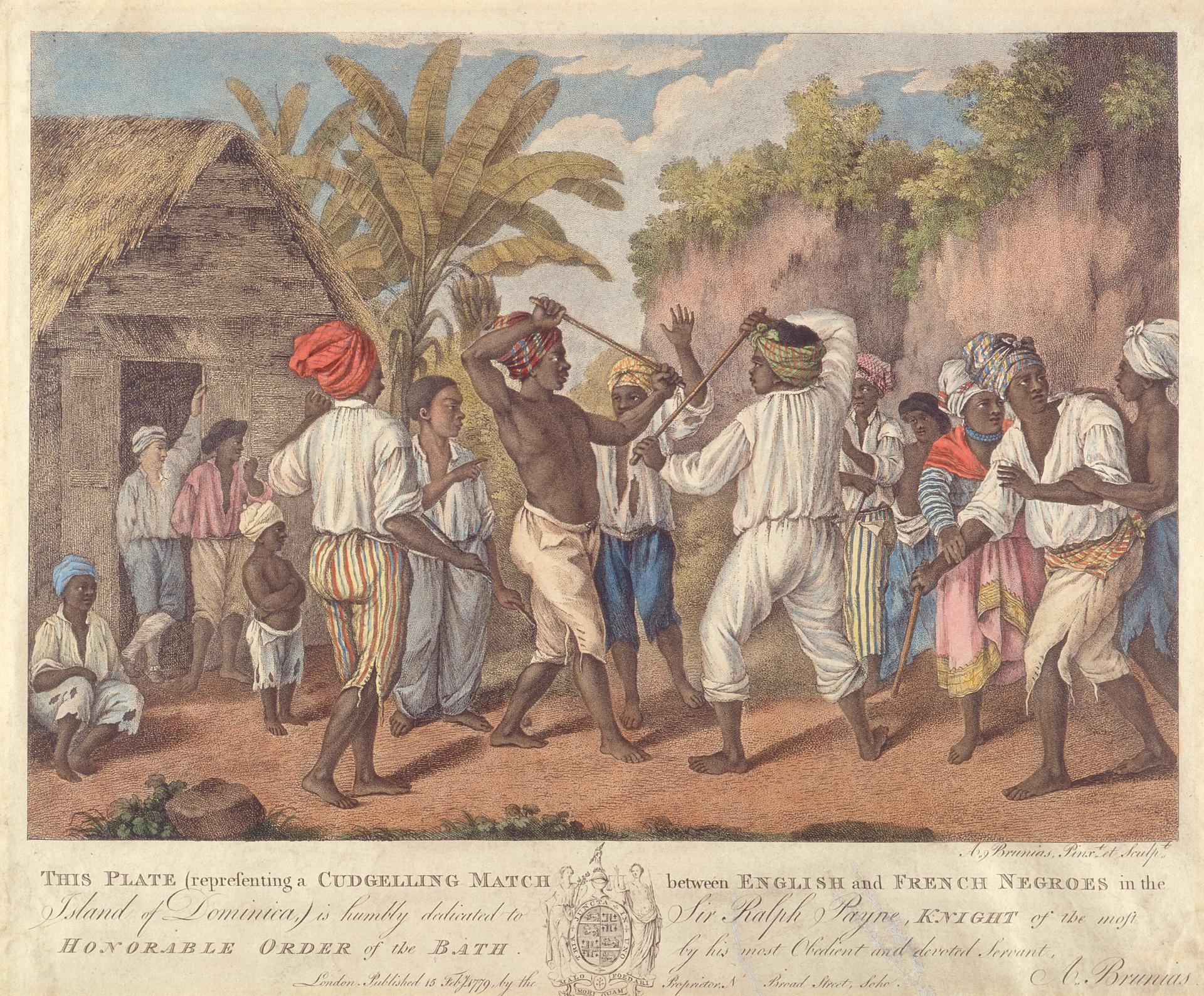
Cudgelling Match between English and French Negroes in the Island of Dominica. 1779.

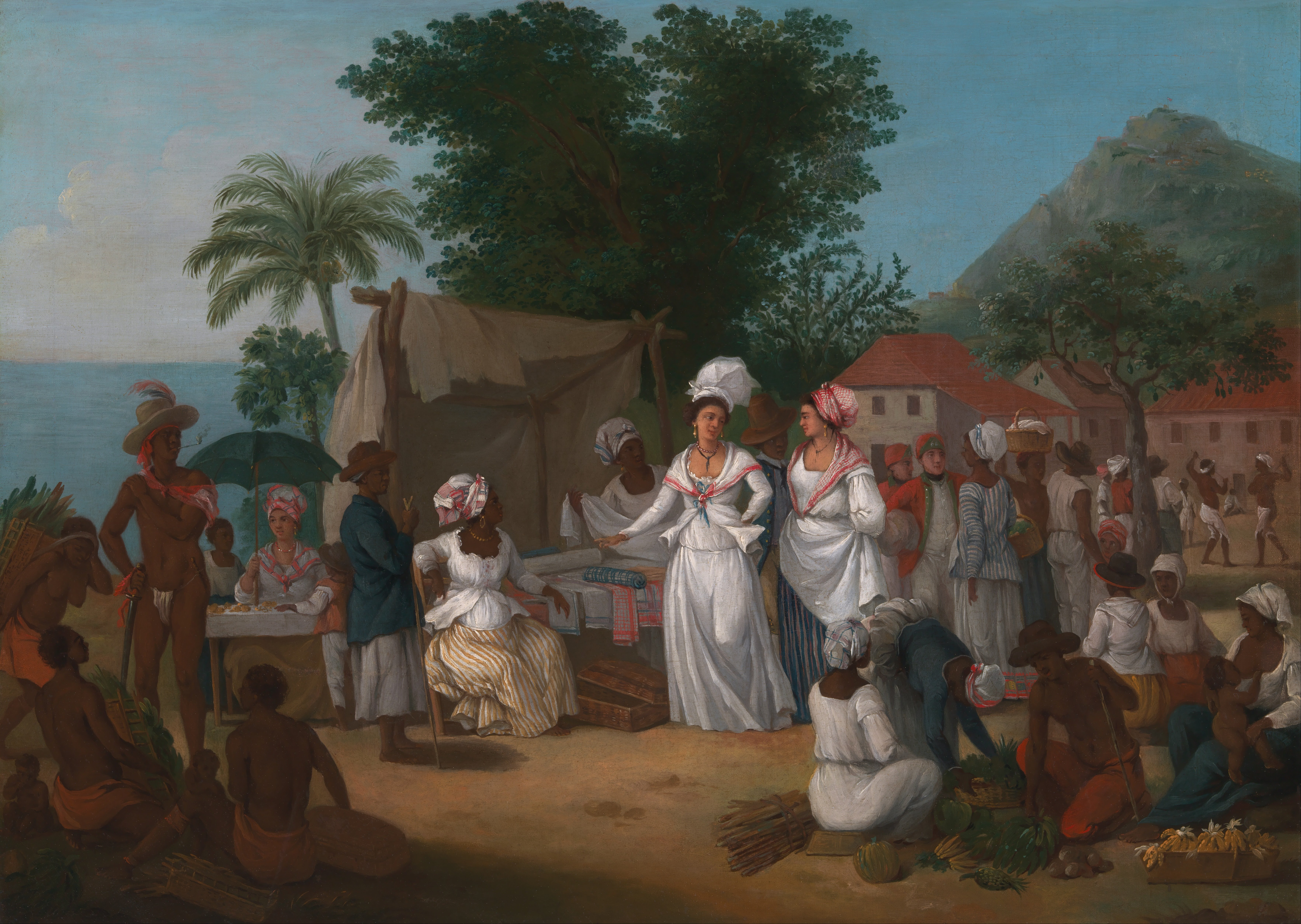
A Linen Market with a Linen-stall and Vegetable Seller in the West Indies ca. 1780

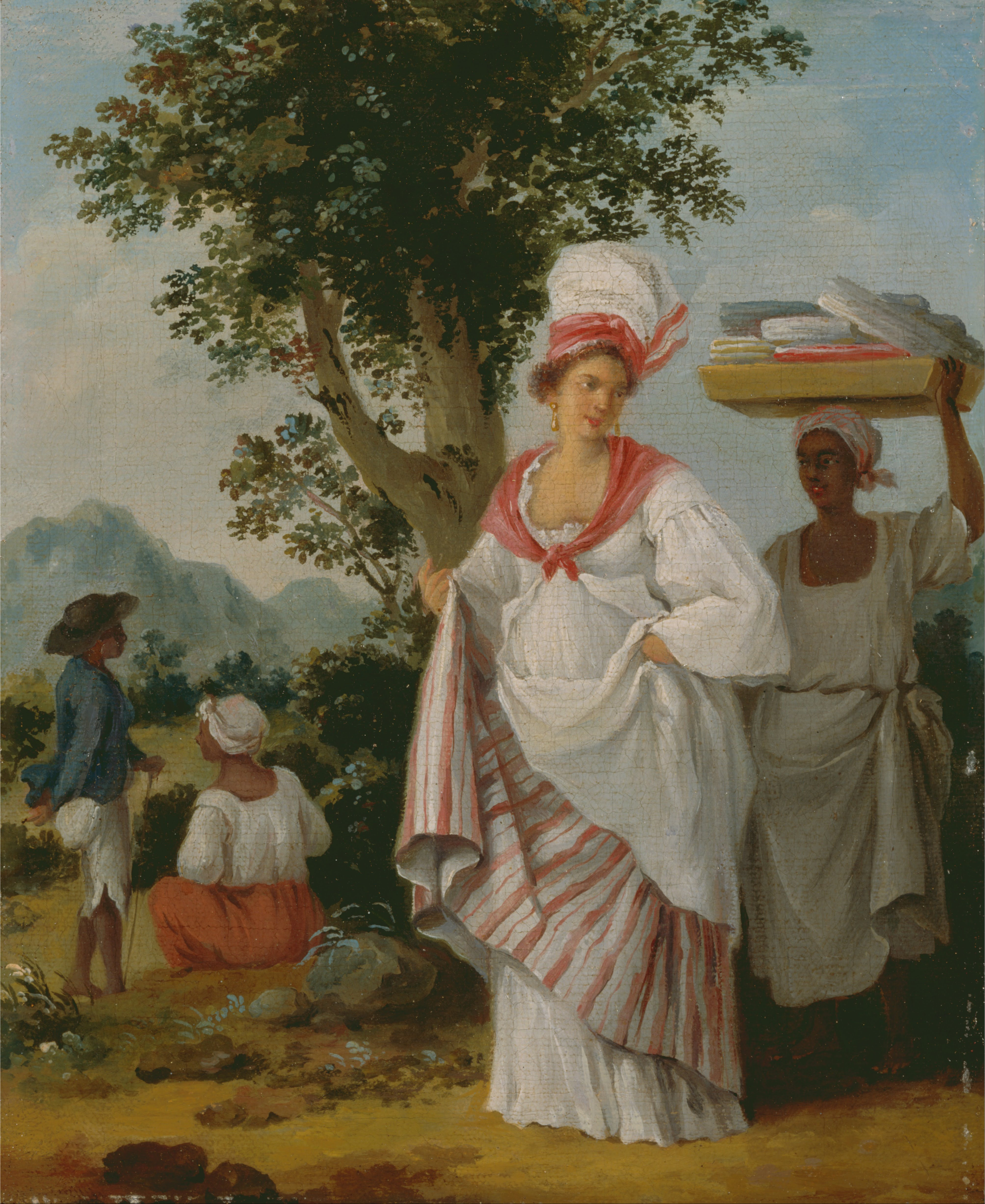
West Indian Creole woman, with her Black Servant ca. 1780

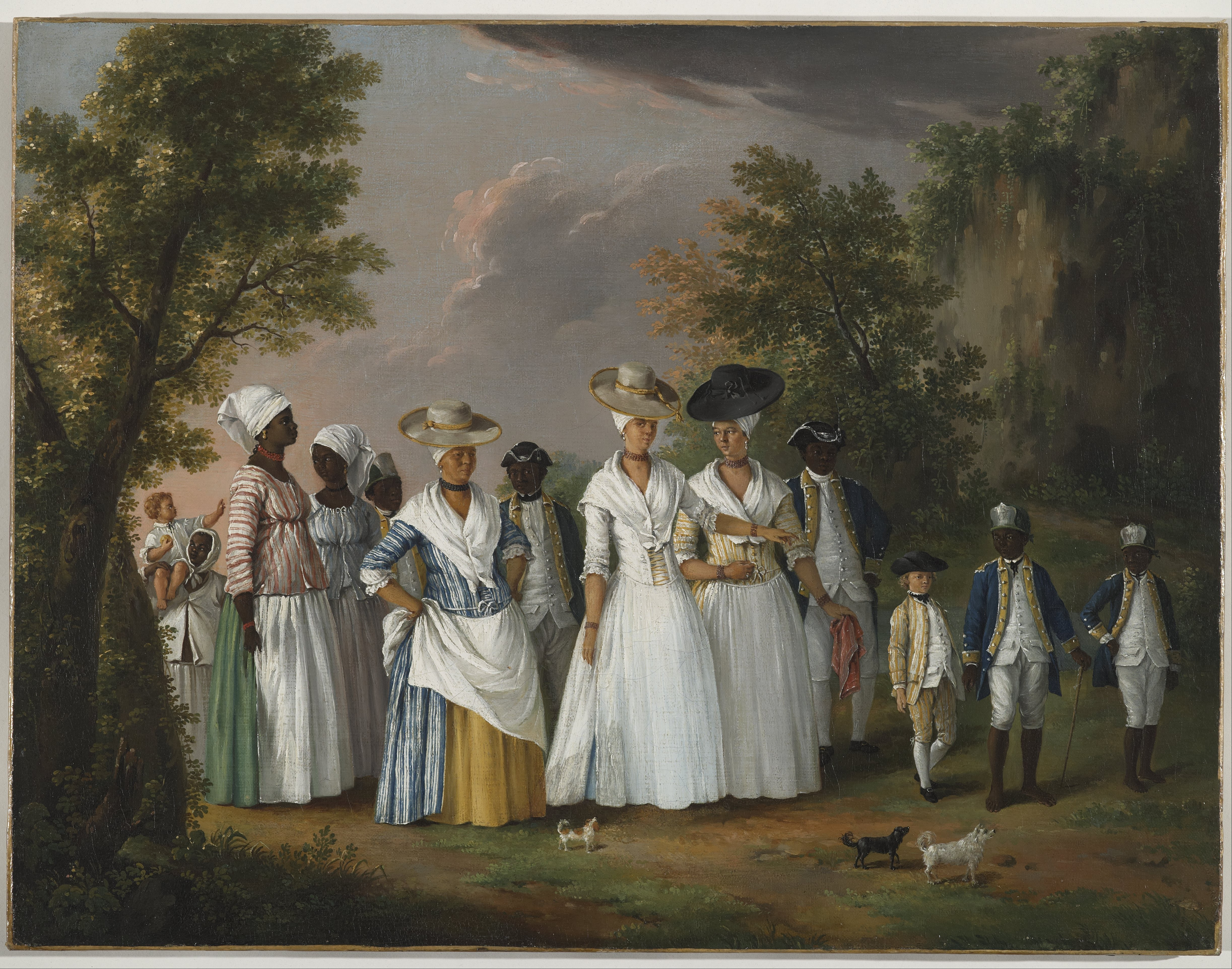
Free Women of Color with their Children and Servants in a Landscape

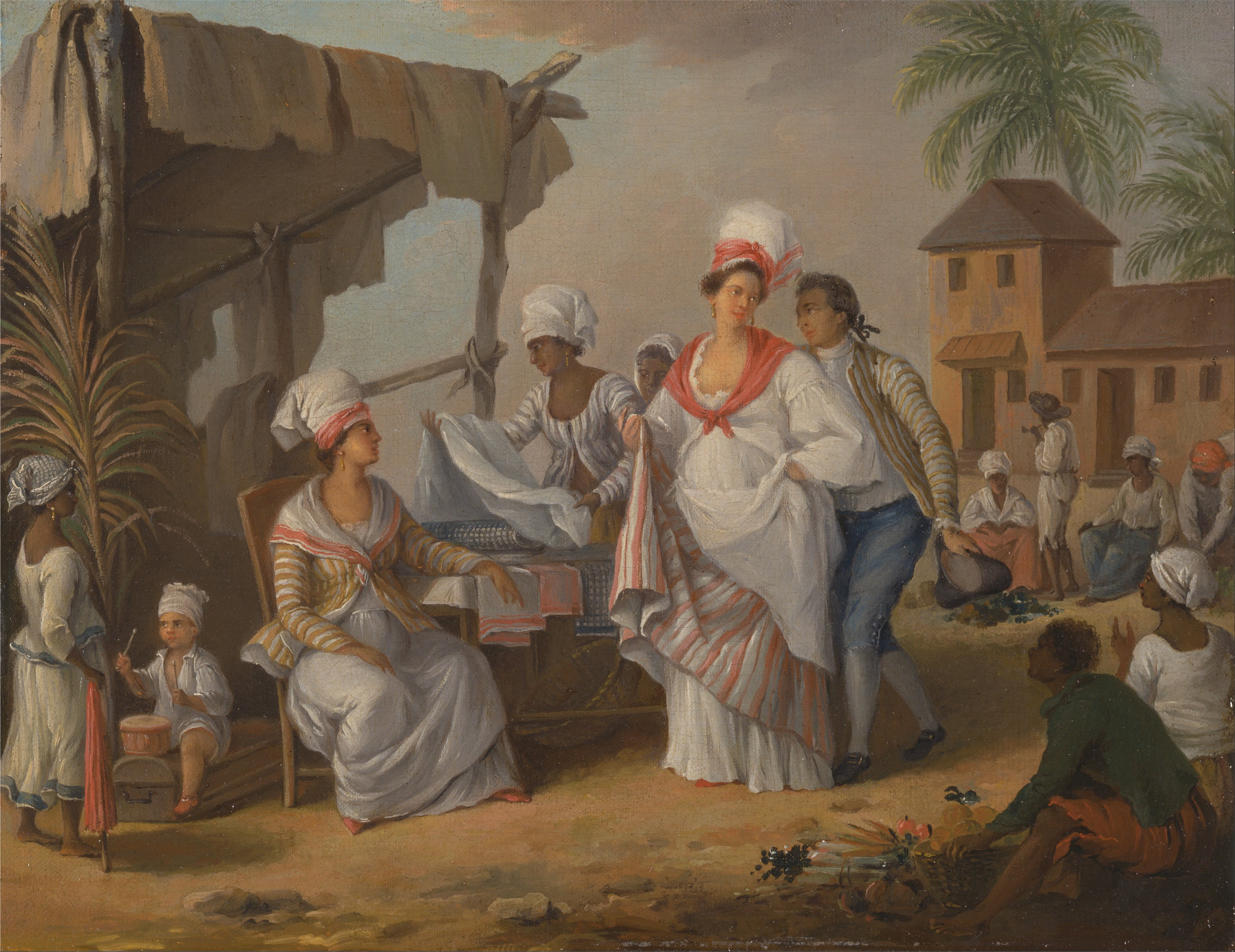
Market Day, Roseau, Dominica

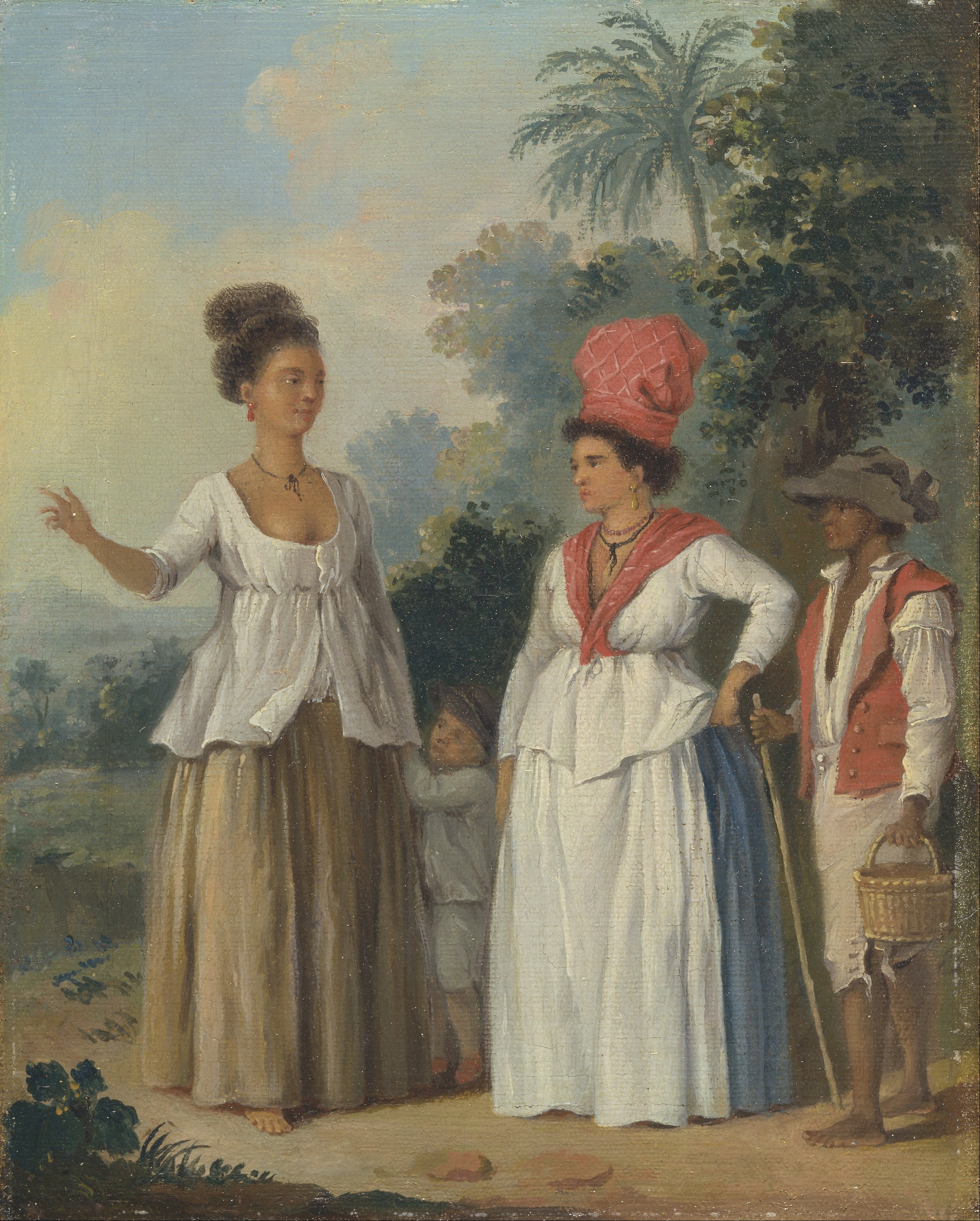
West Indian Women of Color, with a Child and Black Servant ca. 1780

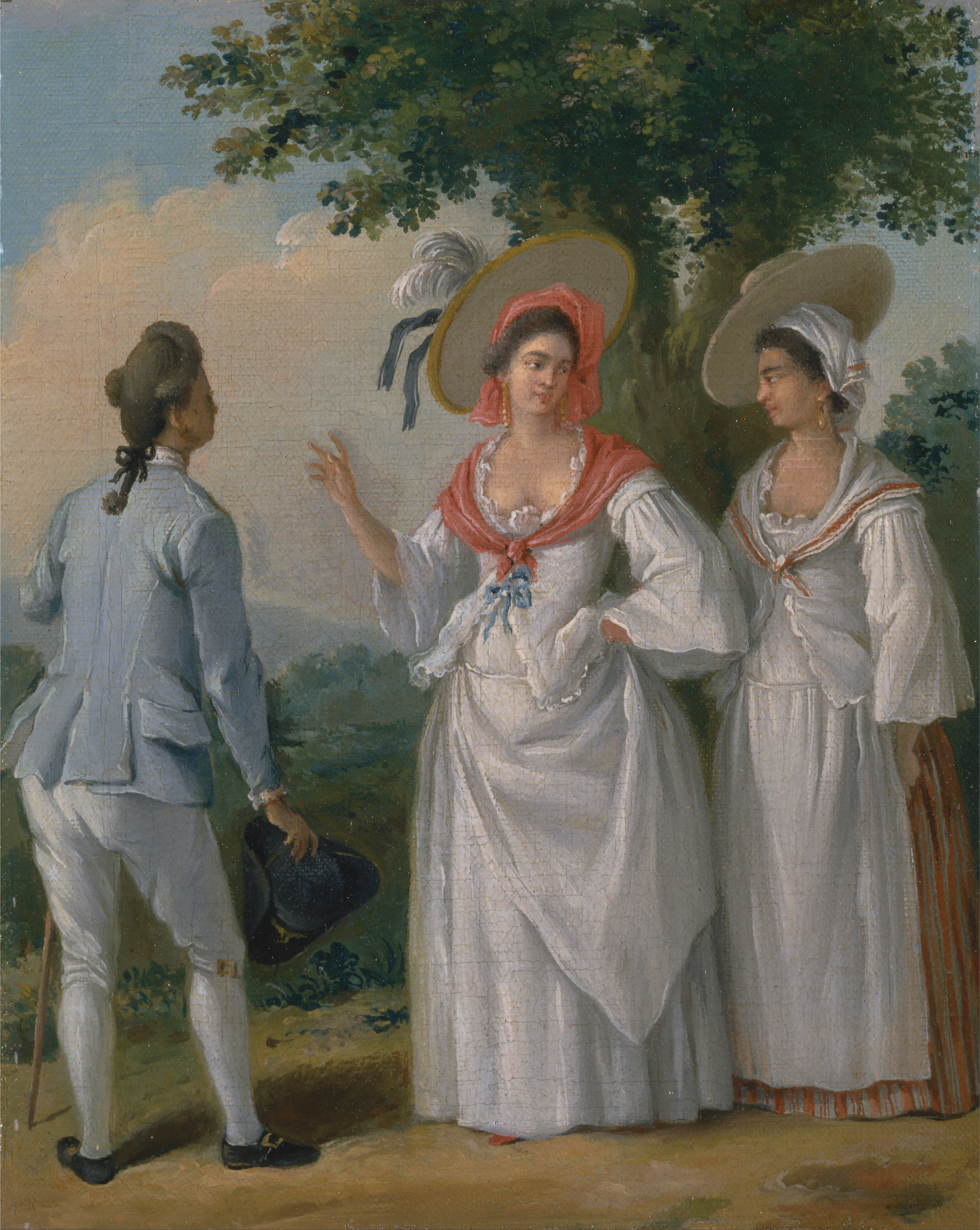
Free West Indian Creoles in Elegant Dress ca. 1780

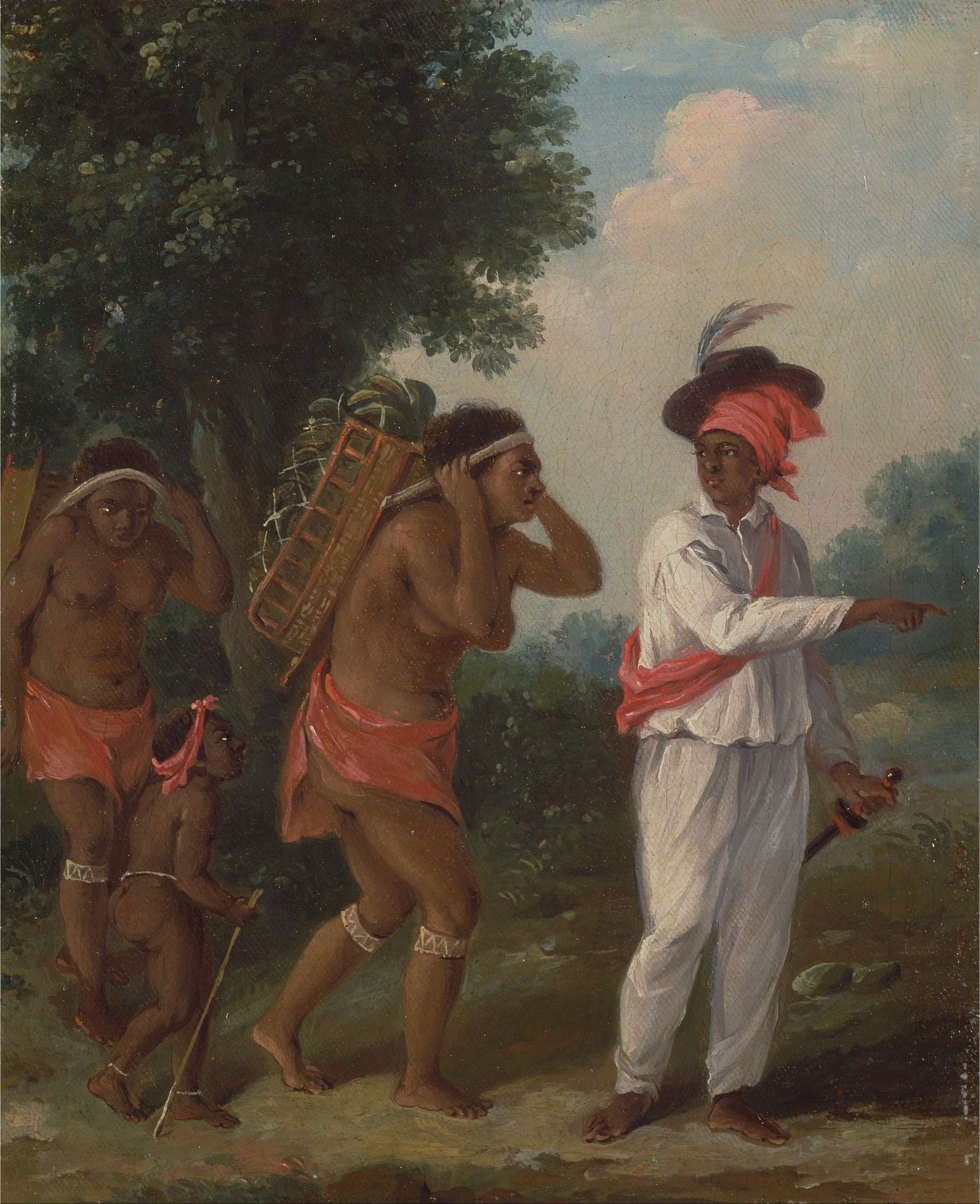
West Indian Man of Color, Directing Two Carib Women with a Child ca. 1780

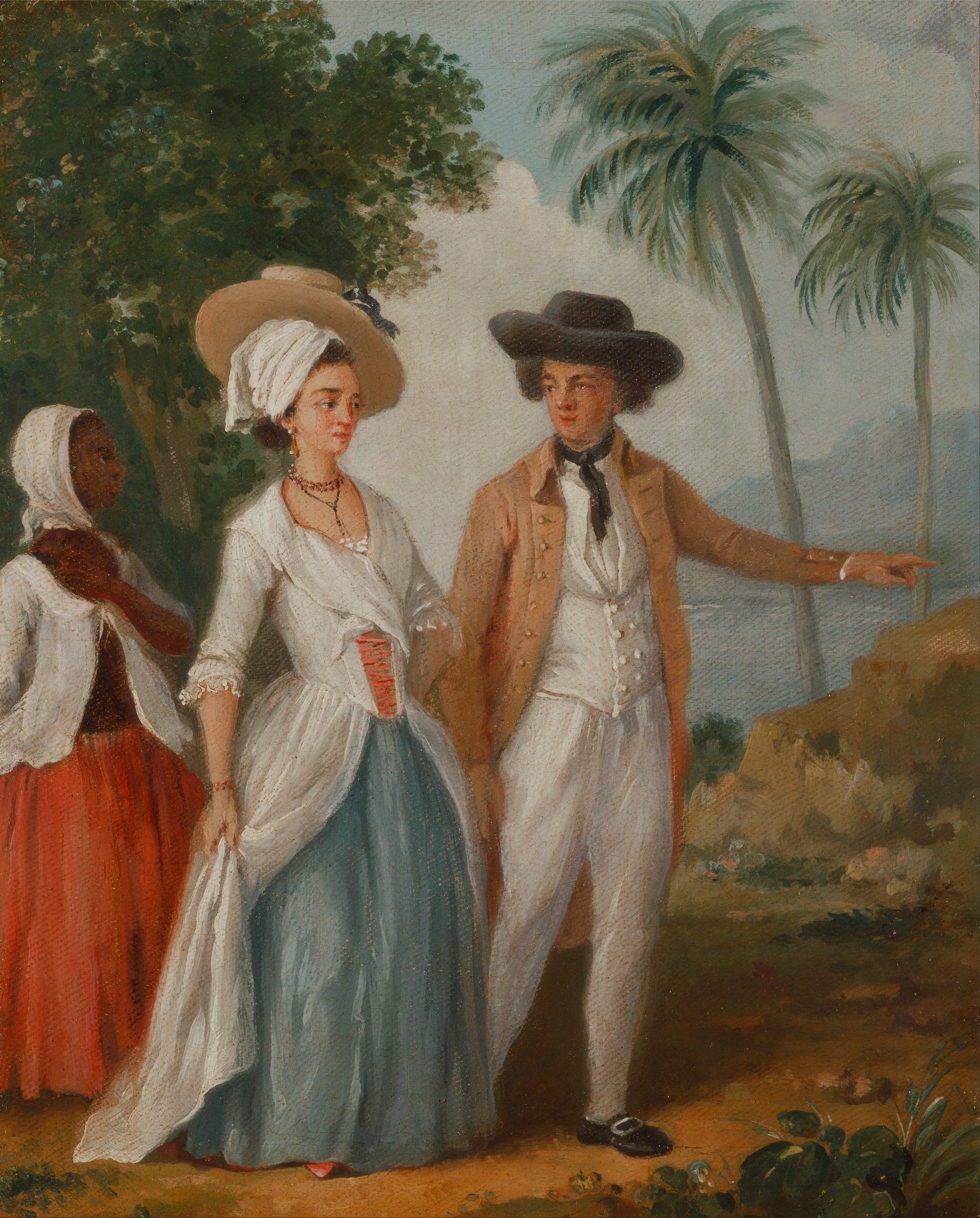
Planter and his Wife, with a Servant ca. 1780

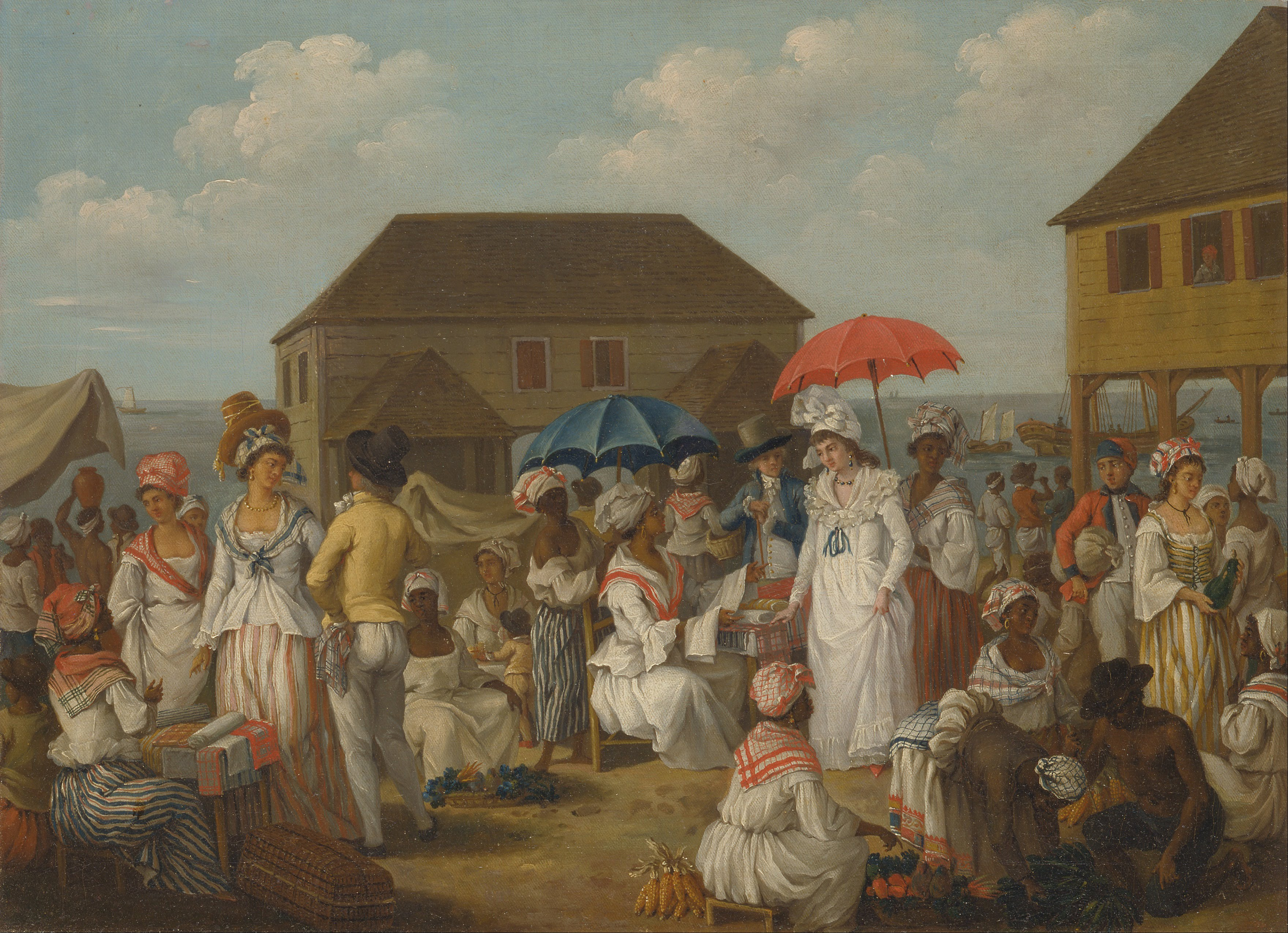
Linen Market in Dominica ca. 1780

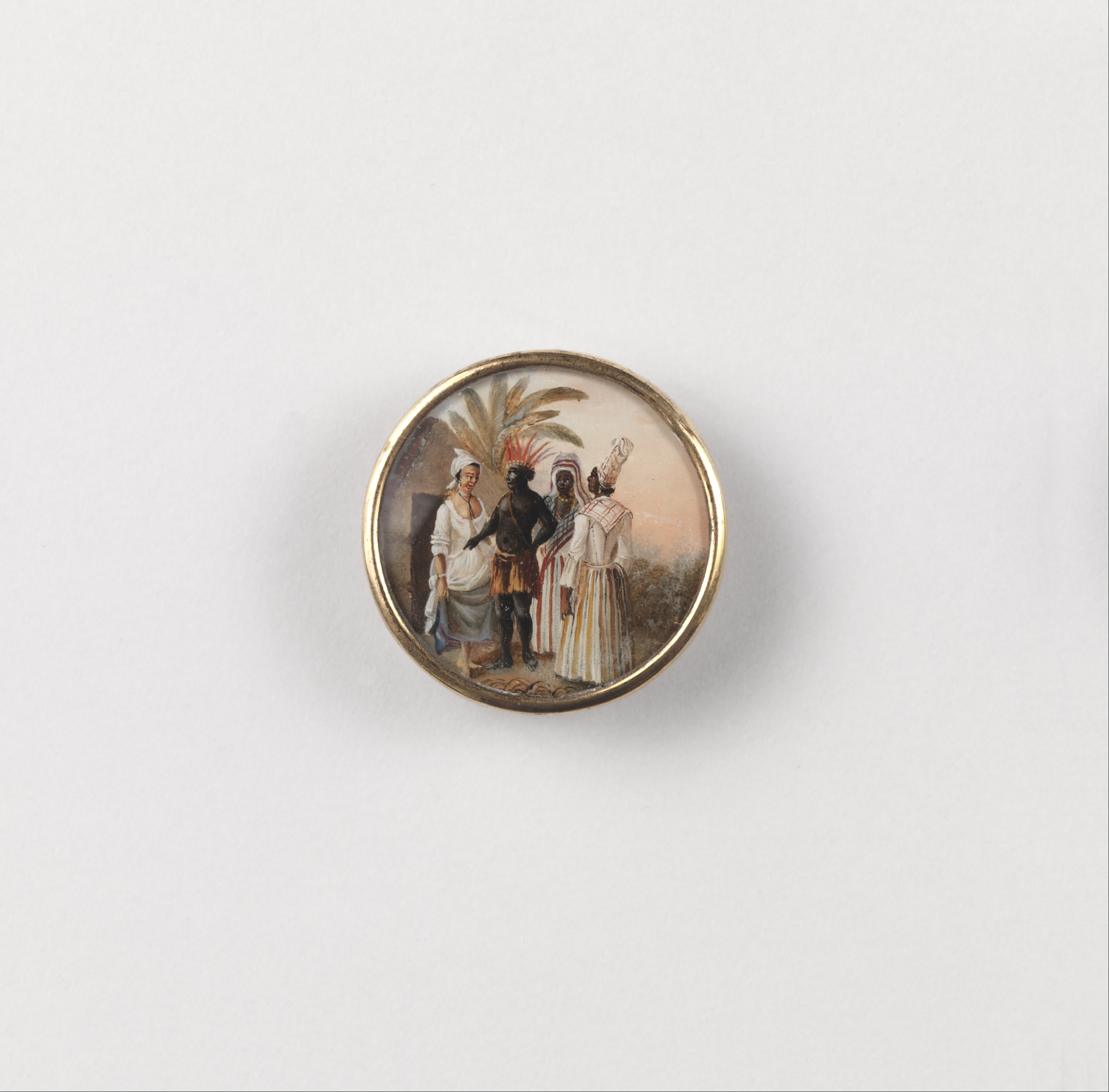
West Indian Scene ca. 1795, miniature painting on a button. Owned by Toussaint L'Ouverture.

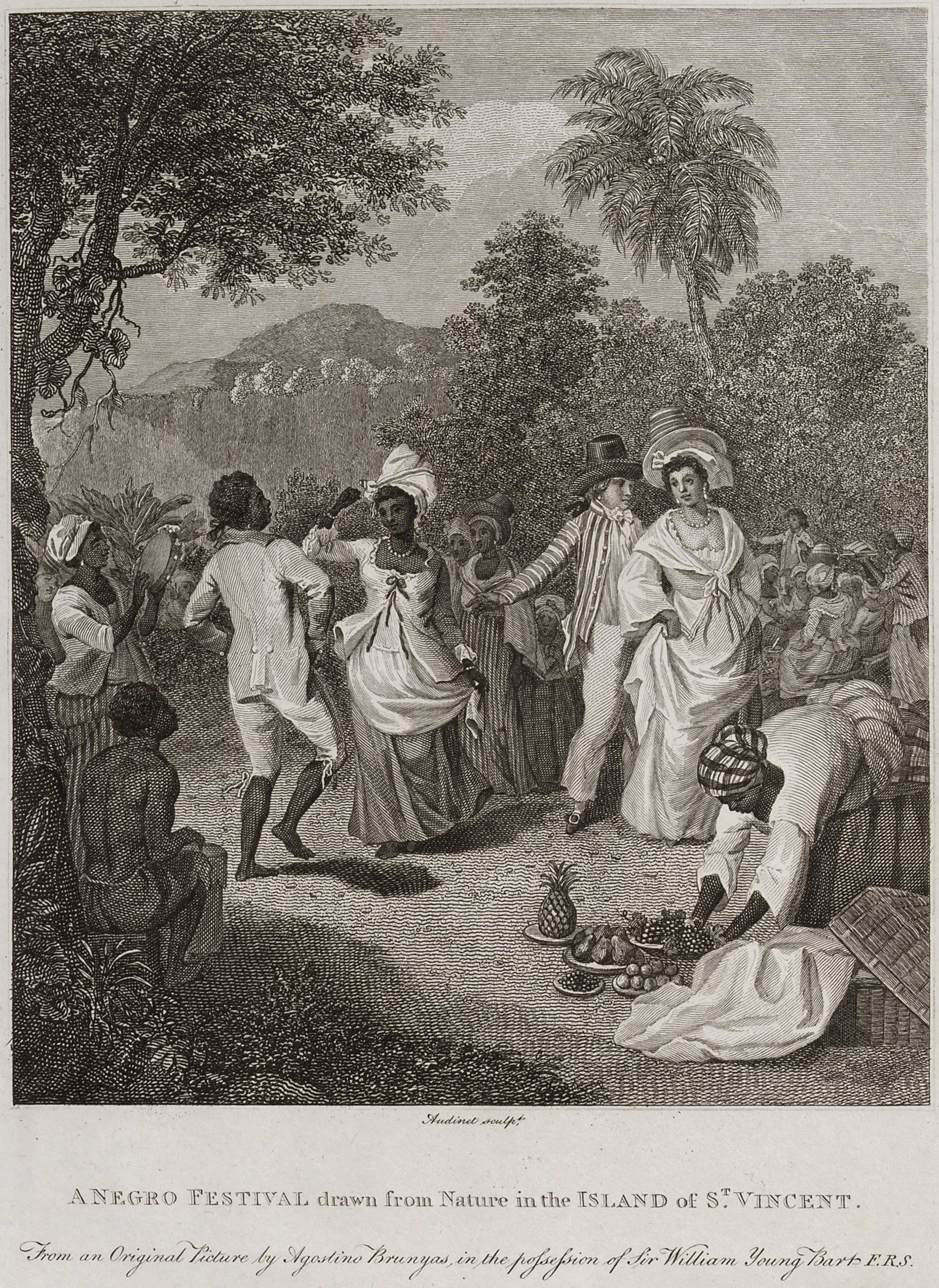
Etching titled A Negro Festival drawn from Nature in the Island of St Vincent/from an original in the collection of Wm. Young

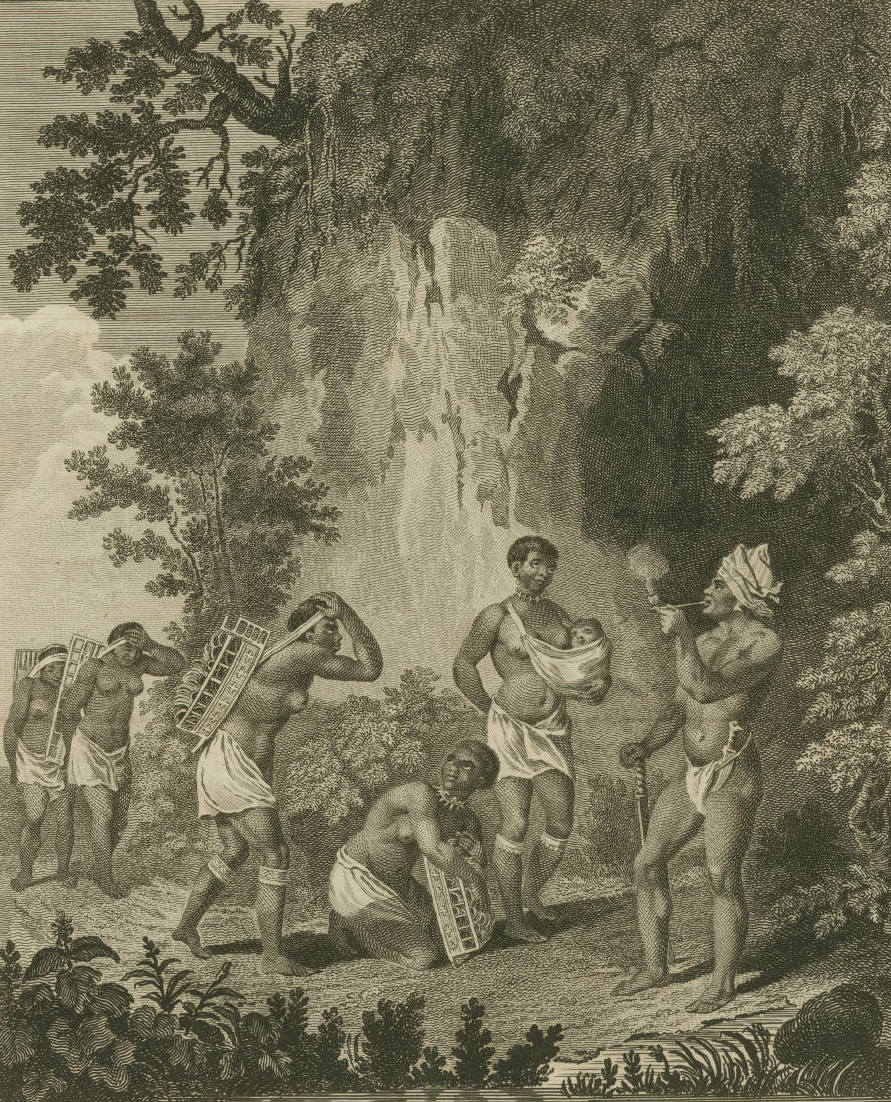
Chatoyer the Chief of the Black Charaibes in St. Vincent with his five Wives. Engraving by Charles Grignion published 1796 after original art by Agosto Brunias.

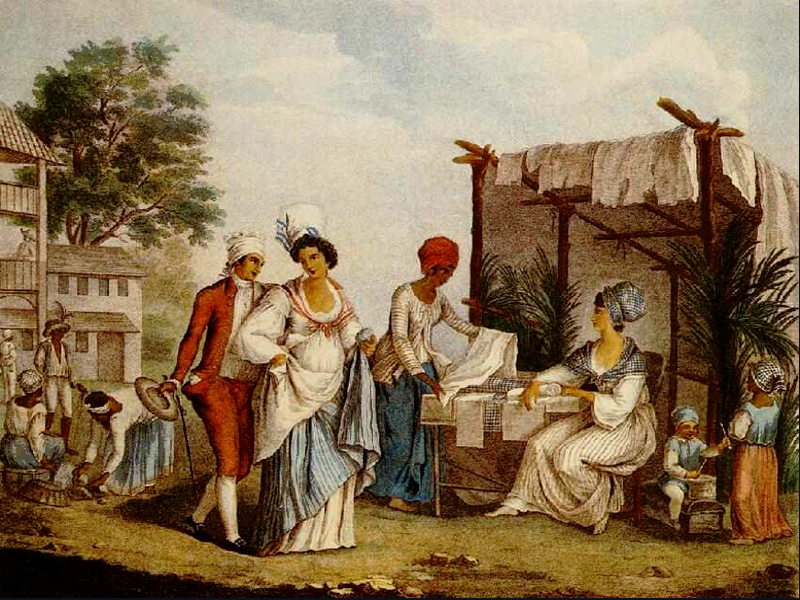
The linen market at Saint-Domingue. Engraving published 1804.
