= Roseau Cathedral =

Church in Roseau, Dominica

Our Lady of Fair Haven of Roseau
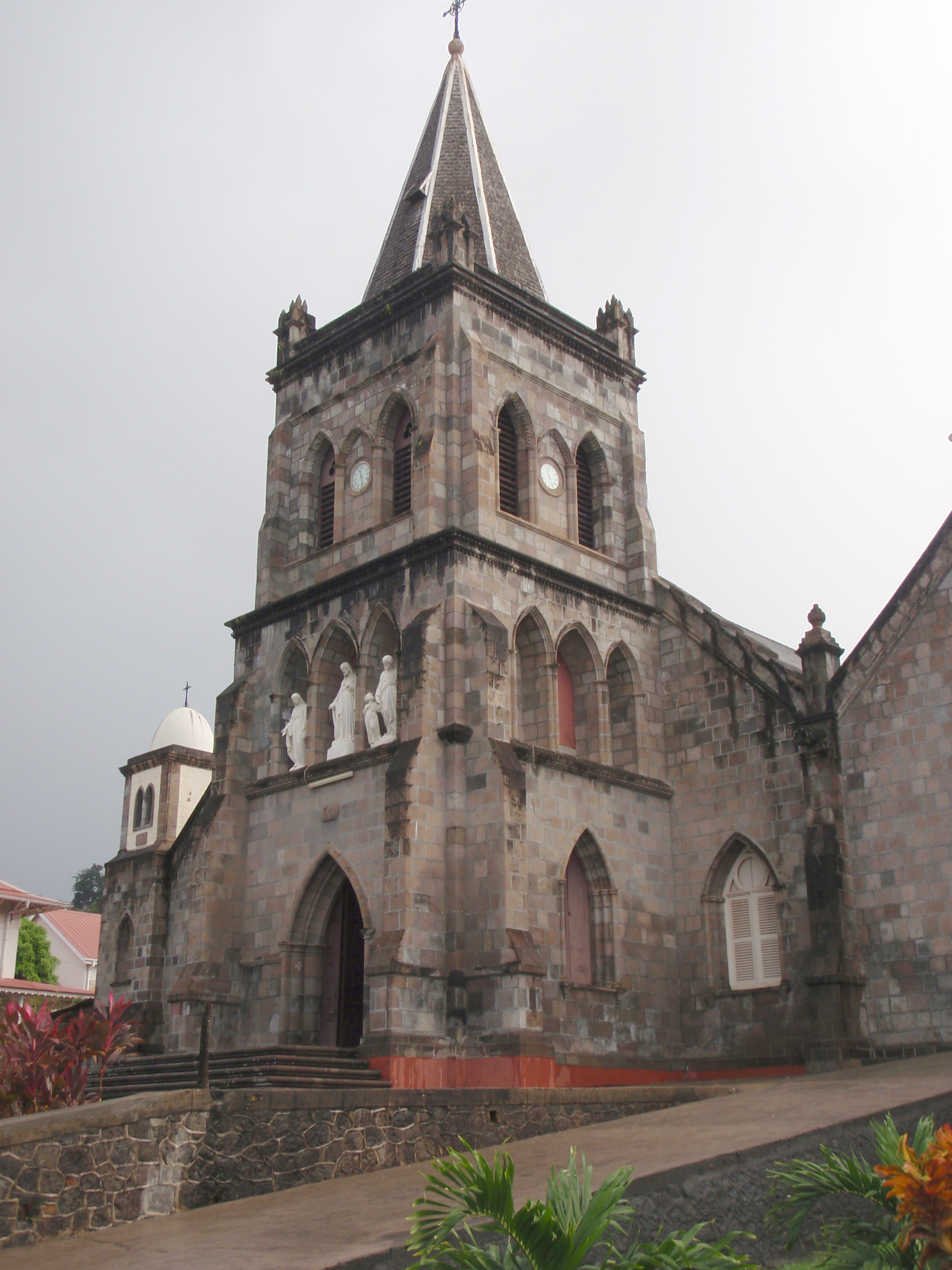
- Roseau Cathedral

- Location within Dominica

Religion
- Affiliation: Roman Catholic
- Diocese: Diocese of Dominica
- Province: Archdiocese of Castries
- Leadership: Bishop Gabriel Malzaire
- Year consecrated: 1916 (1925?)

Location
- Location: Dominica
- Coordinates: 15.2975°N 61.3853°W

Architecture
- Type: Cathedral, parish church
- Style: Gothic Romanesque revival style.
- Groundbreaking: Initially in 1730, then in 1816, 1855, 1873 and finally in the 20th century
- Completed: 1916 (1925?)

Specifications
- Direction of façade: East-northeast
- Materials: Volcanic stones

Website
- www.dioceseofroseau.org

The Cathedral of Our Lady of Fair Haven of Roseau, originally known in French as Église de Notre-Dame du Bon Port du Mouillage de Roseau, (Note: Sometimes called the "Catholic Cathedral of our Lady of Assumption") is a Roman Catholic cathedral in Roseau, the capital city of Dominica in the Caribbean. The church is the see of the Diocese of Dominica, suffragan diocese of the Archdiocese of Castries, Saint Lucia.

The cathedral is an example of European creolisation influence in Dominica. Built in the Gothic Romanesque revival style, the cathedral's consecration, in its present form, is dated to 1916. Though it may appear small from the outside, the interior is spacious and well lit.

== Etymology ==
While Kalinago people originally called the region Sairi, French woodcutters named the city Roseau, in the 18th century. Roseau (reed) is the name of the river, the town, and the cathedral. The cathedral, originally called in French "Église de Notre-Dame du Bon Port du Mouillage de Roseau", (Note: In English: Our Lady of the Good Haven of the Mooring of Roseau) is popularly known as "Our Lady of Fair Haven". It was also known at one time as "Our Lady of Bon Port".

== Geography ==
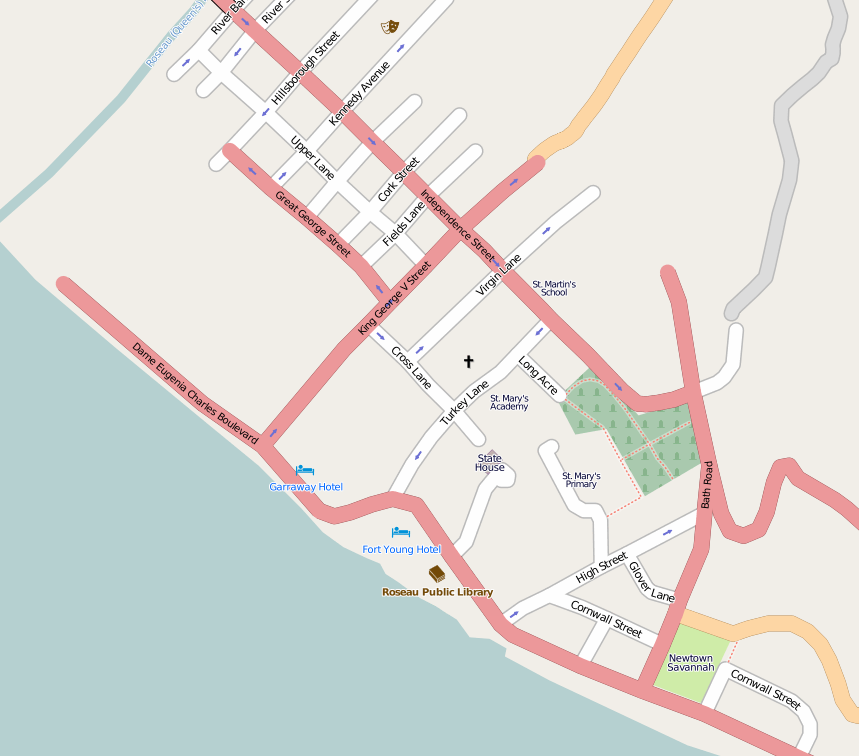
Map of southern Roseau. Roseau Cathedral is the landmark marked with a cross. Click twice to enlarge.

The location of the cathedral is in the southern part of the town of Roseau on the banks of the Roseau River, which assures a good water supply. The availability of a large plane of land on the south river bank also dictated the cathedral's location. The cathedral is located to the north of the Fort Young Hotel and northeast of the Dominica Museum.

== History ==
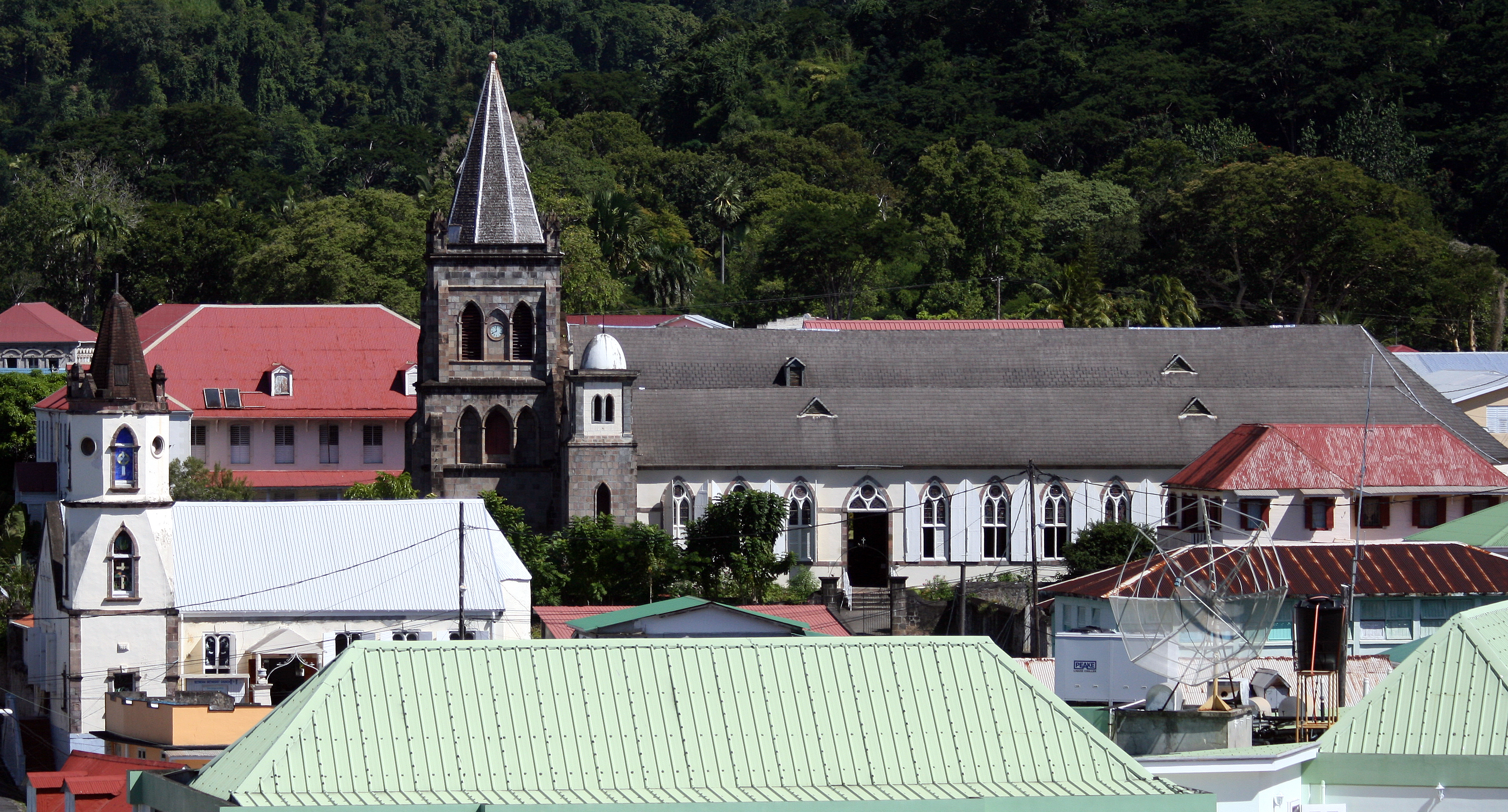
Exterior view of the cathedral.

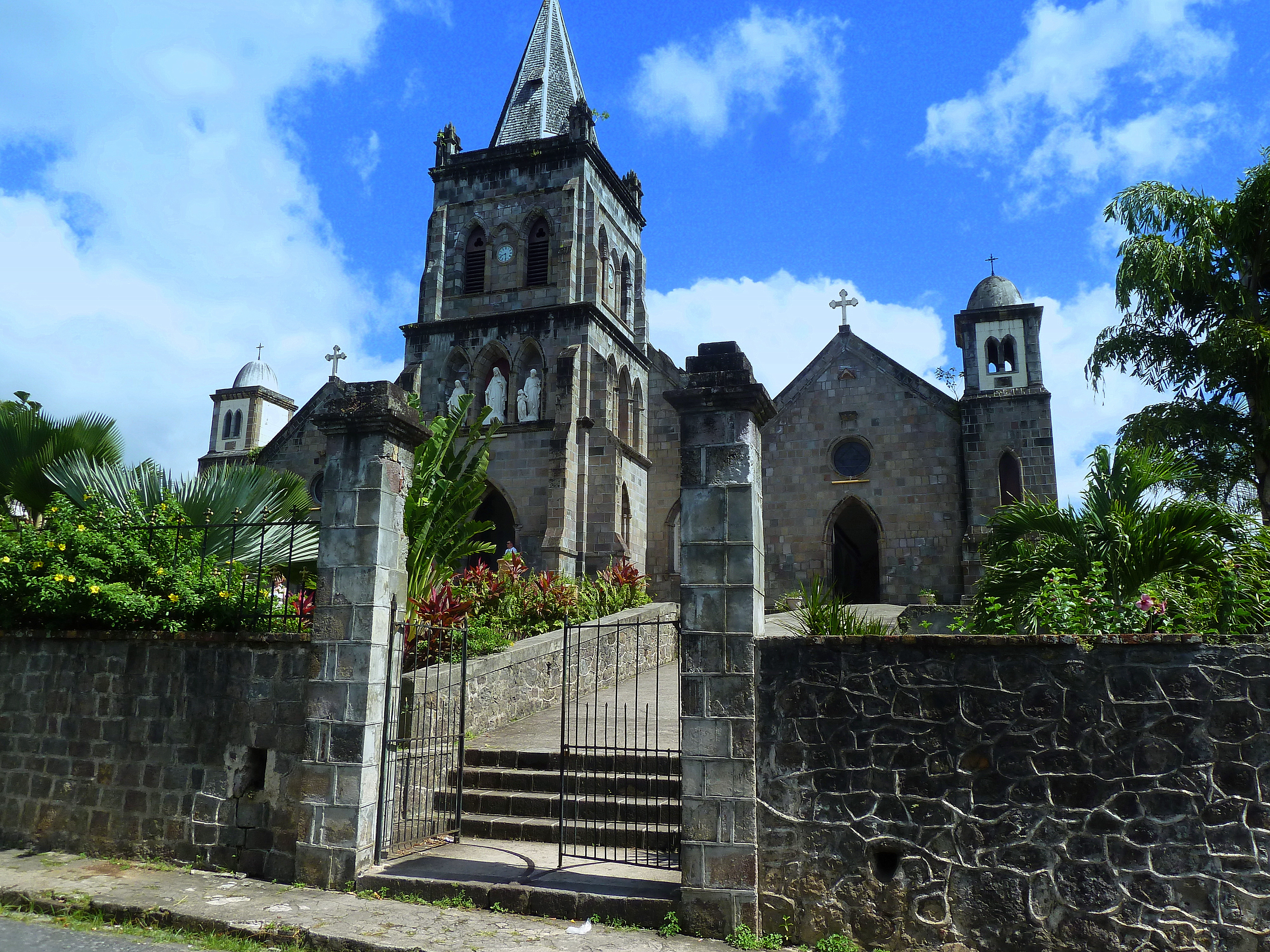
Panoramic view of the cathedral from the front.

The church at Roseau was initially a small wood hut with a thatched roof made of locally available reed. Carib people built the cathedral in the local building tradition.

18th century

In 1727, the plot of land was first surveyed for building. Three years later, in 1730, Father Guillaume Martel established a permanent church. He planned and built a 12 metres (39 ft) by 5 metres (16 ft) church made of solid wood (timber-framed) and stone flooring, to meet the growing congregational needs of settlers who had come from France and occupied territory on the south coast of the island nation.

In April 1796, Agostino Brunias was buried in the Catholic cemetery, located at the site of the church.

19th century

This church survived until 1816 when it was destroyed by hurricane. The present church, which was built 24 years later, located at the same site, was also found to be inadequate to meet the growing needs of church goers. This was a result of the abolition of slavery and permitting former slaves to attend church services. Black and white people sat together to worship in the pews without discrimination. The expansion program which began took almost 100 years to complete to its present form. The additions to the cathedral started with a steeple built in 1855, followed by a wooden ceiling for the cathedral in 1865 by the Kalinagos who cut and brought simaruba trees from the northeast of Roseau; it took them three months to build the wooden ceiling. During this period, a large stone pulpit was also erected. This stone pulpit was carved by prisoners who were kept in Devil's Island (located off the coast of French Guiana). In the year 1873, at the southeast end, the Chapel of St. Joseph came to be established along with a crypt where bishops and priests could be buried. In 1853, the town and the parish had a population of 6000 Catholics. As the Catholic Ministry did not support the building activity, the Catholic community carried stones to the site to build the church. A hurricane in 1863 caused substantial damage to the cathedral, which necessitated raising funds not only for its restoration, but also for many other churches on the island, which also had been destroyed by the hurricane. Funds were raised by imposing a levy on the French planters.

20th century

Following this, refurbishing started with stained-glass windows being added to the church, and the addition of new stone pillars in 1902. The steeple was added on the western end, which was built with stones brought from the old church at Point Michael, then demolished. Building this part of the church brought symmetry to the cathedral's façade. Mention is also made that the cathedral's spire was completed in 1916. The cathedral was formally consecrated in 1925 by Bishop James Morris. After 1925, only minor additions in the form of electrical connections, a public address system and a clock have been made.

== Architecture and fittings ==
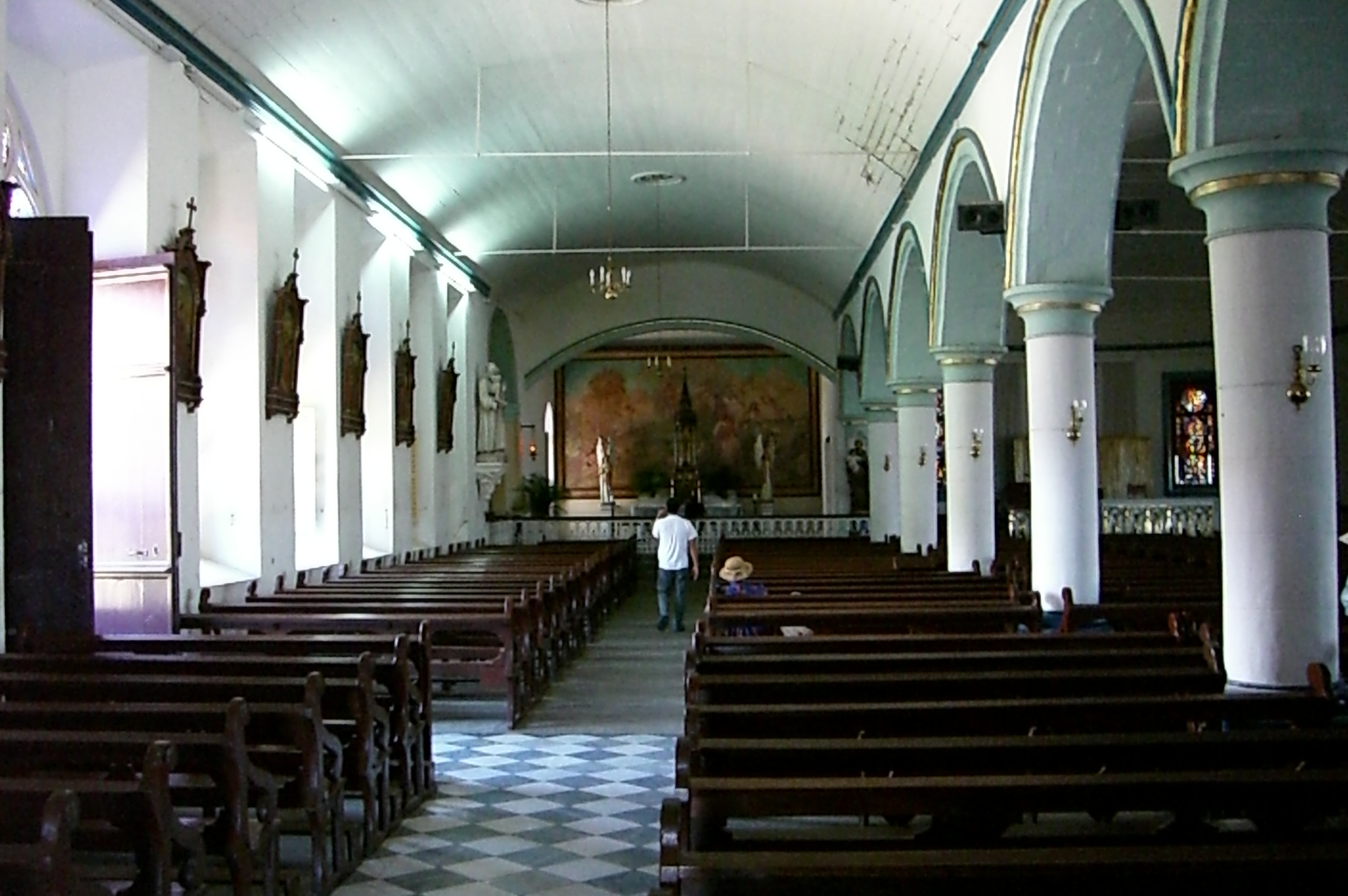
Interior view of the cathedral.

The cathedral is on Virgin Lane, west of the Methodist Church. It is a stone edifice with an expansive interior. The Gothic Romanesque Revival-style building is constructed of volcanic rock, both inside and out, and is built to withstand earthquakes. The bell tower is stubby, with a giant clock. The windows are Gothic with stained glass in the upper section and aligned wooden shutters in the lower sections, to provide good ventilation. One of the stained-glass windows is dedicated to Christopher Columbus. The building is well maintained.

The interior of the cathedral is finely carved and has Victorian pews. There are ornate Victorian murals behind the side altars, painted by the local artists. The east and west walls have windows from the entrance to the altar. The organ in the cathedral was installed in January 1883.
