= Mary Young Sewell =

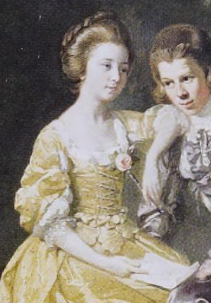
- Mary with her brother William, from The Family of Sir William Young by Johann Zoffany, 1767 - 1769
- Died: 9 December 1821; Chertsey
- Occupation: Poet
- Spouse(s): George Sewell
- Parent(s): Sir William Young; Elizabeth Taylor
- Relatives: Sir William Young, 2nd Baronet

Mary Young Sewell (c. 1759 - 9 December 1821) was a British poet.

== Early life ==
Mary Young was the daughter of Sir William Young, 1st Baronet, of North Dean, colonial governor of Dominica, and his second wife, Elizabeth Taylor, the daughter of the mathematician Brook Taylor. She appears with her family in the conversation piece The Family of Sir William Young, painted by Johan Zoffany, probably in 1767. She is seated on the far right on a parapet next to her brother William, wearing a lemon yellow dress and holding a letter. Her father owned four Caribbean sugar plantations and 896 enslaved Africans on his death, inherited by William.

== Writing career ==
She published two books of poetry before her marriage. Horatio and Amanda (1777) is a long sentimental poem about a couple permanently separated by war. Amanda finds Horatio's body on the battlefield, only identifiable by her own needlework. Innocence (1790) is an allegorical poem about Innocence, who initially pursues Pleasure before being saved by Religion.

She married the Rev. George Sewell, rector of Byfleet, Surrey. After his death in 1801, she published Poems (1803), which had a lengthy list of subscribers, including royalty and prominent authors like Elizabeth Montagu.

Mary Sewell died on 9 December 1821 in Chertsey.

Her work has been often confused with that of Mary Julia Young and their works have been misattributed to each other.

== Bibliography ==
- Horatio and Amanda a Poem by a Young Lady. London: Printed for J. Robson, 1777.
- Innocence: an allegorical poem. By Miss Mary Young. London: Printed for J. Evans; and sold by T. Hookham; and T. Lake, Uxbridge, 1790
- Poems, By Mrs. G. Sewell, relict of the late Rev. Geo. Sewell, Rector of Byfleet, Surrey. Wetton and Sons, Printers, Egham and Chertsey, 1803
