= Government House, Dominica =

Official residence of the president of Dominica

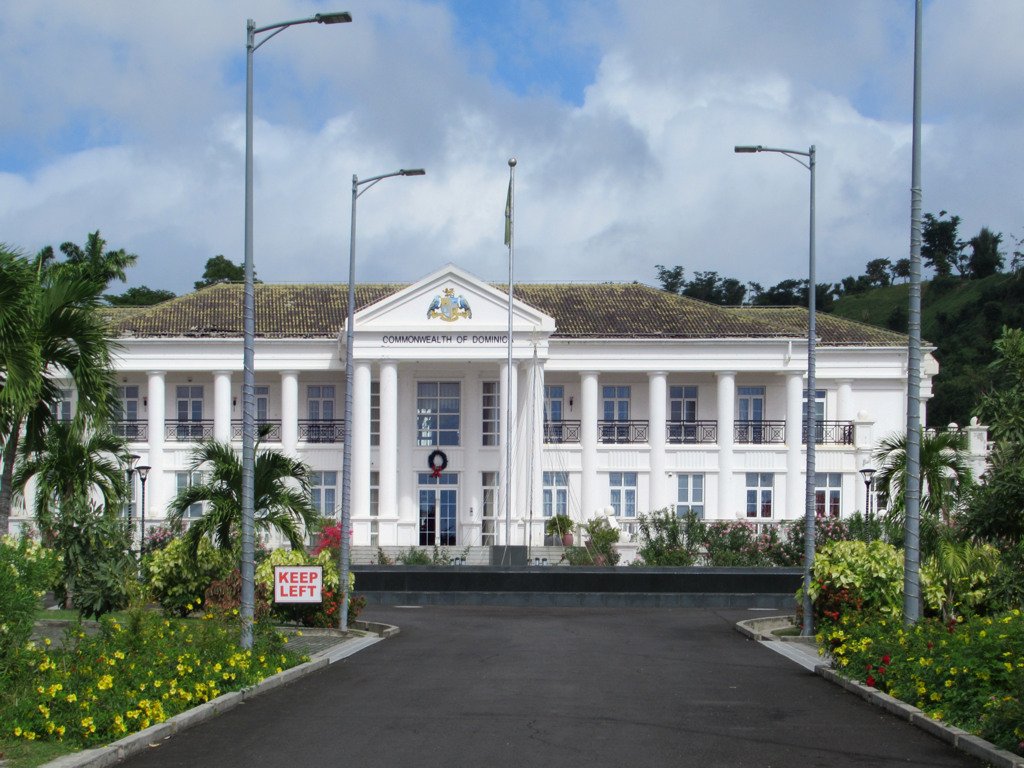
- Government House, Dominica. Victoria Street, Roseau
- Interactive map of the Government House, Dominica area

General information
- Location: Roseau, Dominica
- Coordinates: 15°17′47″N 61°23′06″W

The State House, located in Roseau, is the official residence of the president of Dominica. Previously it was used as the official residence of the colonial governors of Dominica.

== Colonial history ==
The residence of the British governors of the island, and for a time the French, is situated on a low hill to the south of the commercial center of Roseau. Written accounts from the 1790s make mention of various plants and an avenue of trees in the grounds of Government House.

Sir William Young was sworn in as governor of Dominica on 14 November 1770. He was responsible for among other things, directing the construction of the first Government House, which he built near the Fort Young.

== Location and gardens ==
In 1970, Government House was within a half mile of the Botanic Gardens, with Fort Young Hotel across the street.

The gardens at the facility have suffered periodically from hurricanes. Many trees were destroyed in 1916, 1930 and 1979.

In the 1950s, prison labour was routinely used for cleaning the outside of the building and the upkeep of the gardens.

== Recent history ==
Once the official residence of the Queen's representative, the building has been the home to the president of Dominica since independence in 1978.

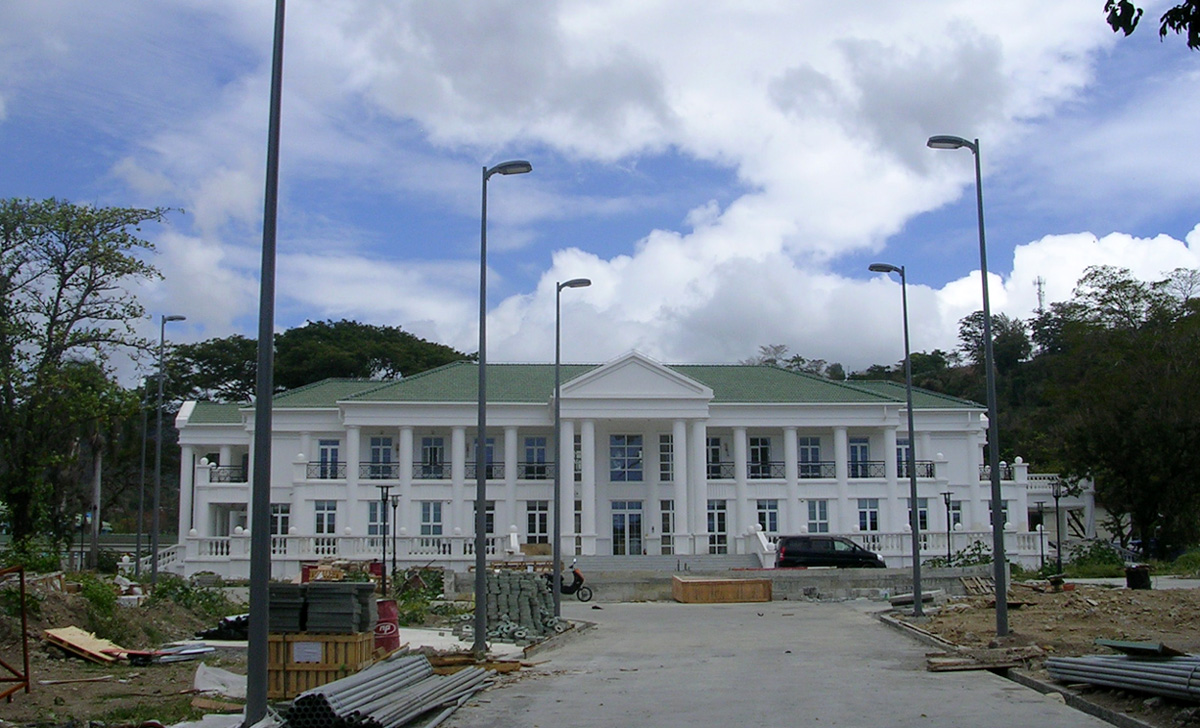
New residence under construction in 2012

In 2012, work began on the redevelopment of the State House campus. These works included the construction of a new residence for the president of the Commonwealth of Dominica, the restoration of the old State House, the construction of a new building to house the Electoral Commission, new perimeter fencing, new parking and landscaping.

The new state residence is now located in the center of the lawn, where a previous residence for former governors of the island once sat. It is in alignment with the newly restored former residence, and the new Electoral Commission offices along Jewel Street at the northern entrance to the campus. The redevelopment of the State House campus was completed in 2013.

== See also ==
- Government Houses of the British Empire
