= Real Mas =

Dominica culture

The Real Mas, or the Dominica Carnival is a carnival held annually in Dominica. National festivities take place during which course a calypso competition, the Miss Dominica beauty contest and Miss Teen Dominica take place, amongst other events.
