= Fort Young (Dominica) =

- Roseau, Dominica

Site information
- Type: Fortification
- Condition: Ruins

Location
- Location in Caribbean Fort Young (the Caribbean)
- Coordinates: 15.29647°N 61.38624°W

Site history
- Built: 1770
- In use: No
- Materials: Stone
- Battles/wars: 1778 Invasion of Dominica (American Revolutionary War)

Fort Young was a major military installation on the Caribbean island of Dominica. It was built by the British in 1770. The fort was named for Sir William Young, the island's first civilian British governor. Today, only ruins remain of the fort, and the site is the location of the Fort Young Hotel.

== History ==
=== 17th and 18th centuries ===
In 1699, during the first French occupation of Barbados, a fort was built in Roseau, present-day capital of Dominica. In 1770, during the first British occupation of Barbados, a new fort was built at the location. The new fort was named "Fort Young" for Sir William Young, the island's first civilian British governor. Young ordered the fort's construction during the time of the American Revolutionary War. The fort was expanded by Captain Bruce, Royal Engineer, to contain 17 cannons.

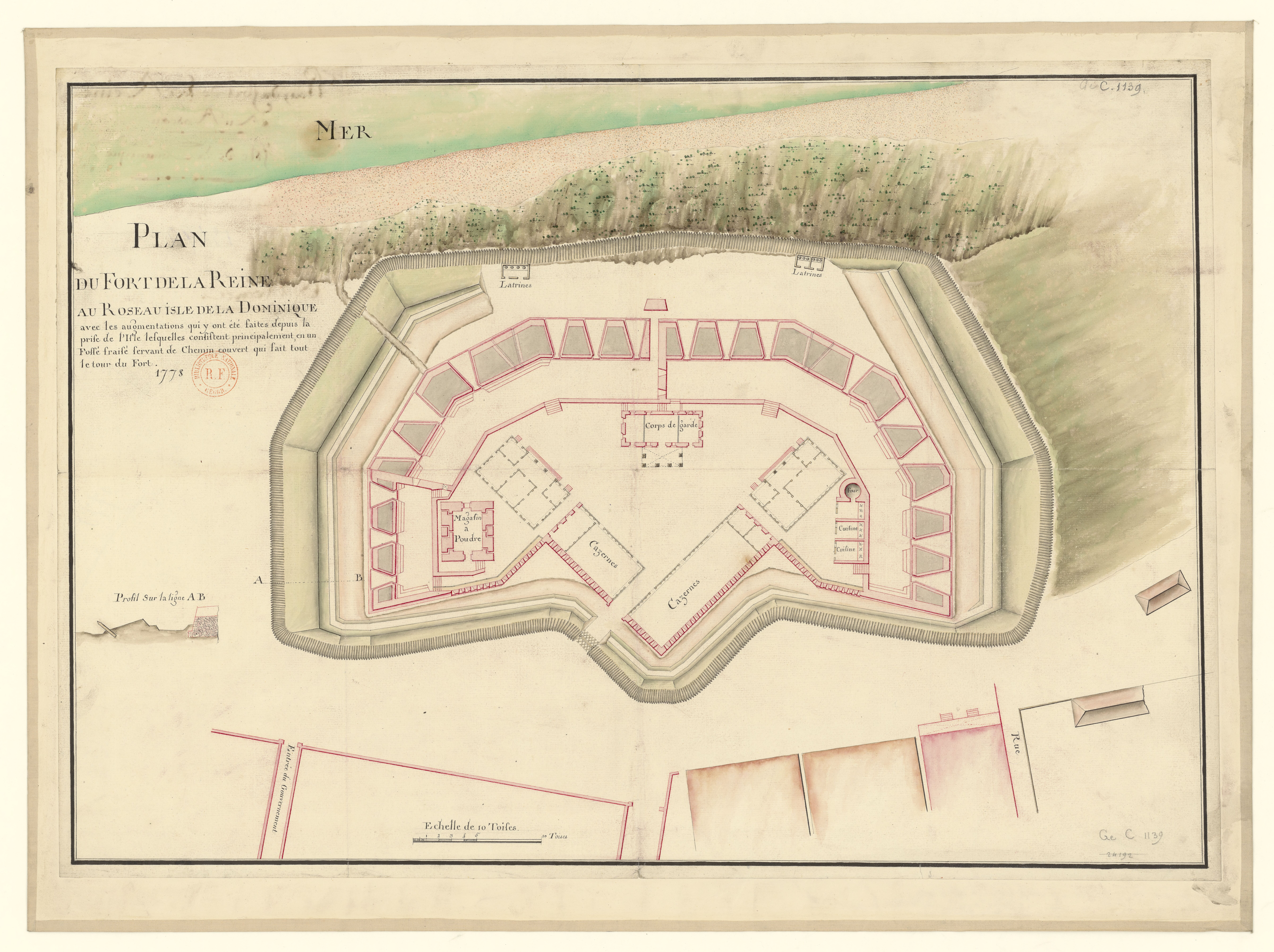
1778 French plan of the fort

In 1778, the French successfully invaded Dominica and capturing multiple forts including Fort Young, and overtaking the island. During this second occupation by the French, the fort's name was changed to Fort de La Reine. Additions were made to the fort, including improvements to the barracks, storeroom, and ramparts. Dominica remained controlled by the French until 1784. The island was returned to British control under the terms of the Treaty of Paris. On the January 10, 1784, a cannon salute was fired from Fort Young as Governor John Orde arrived via frigate to retake possession of Dominica.

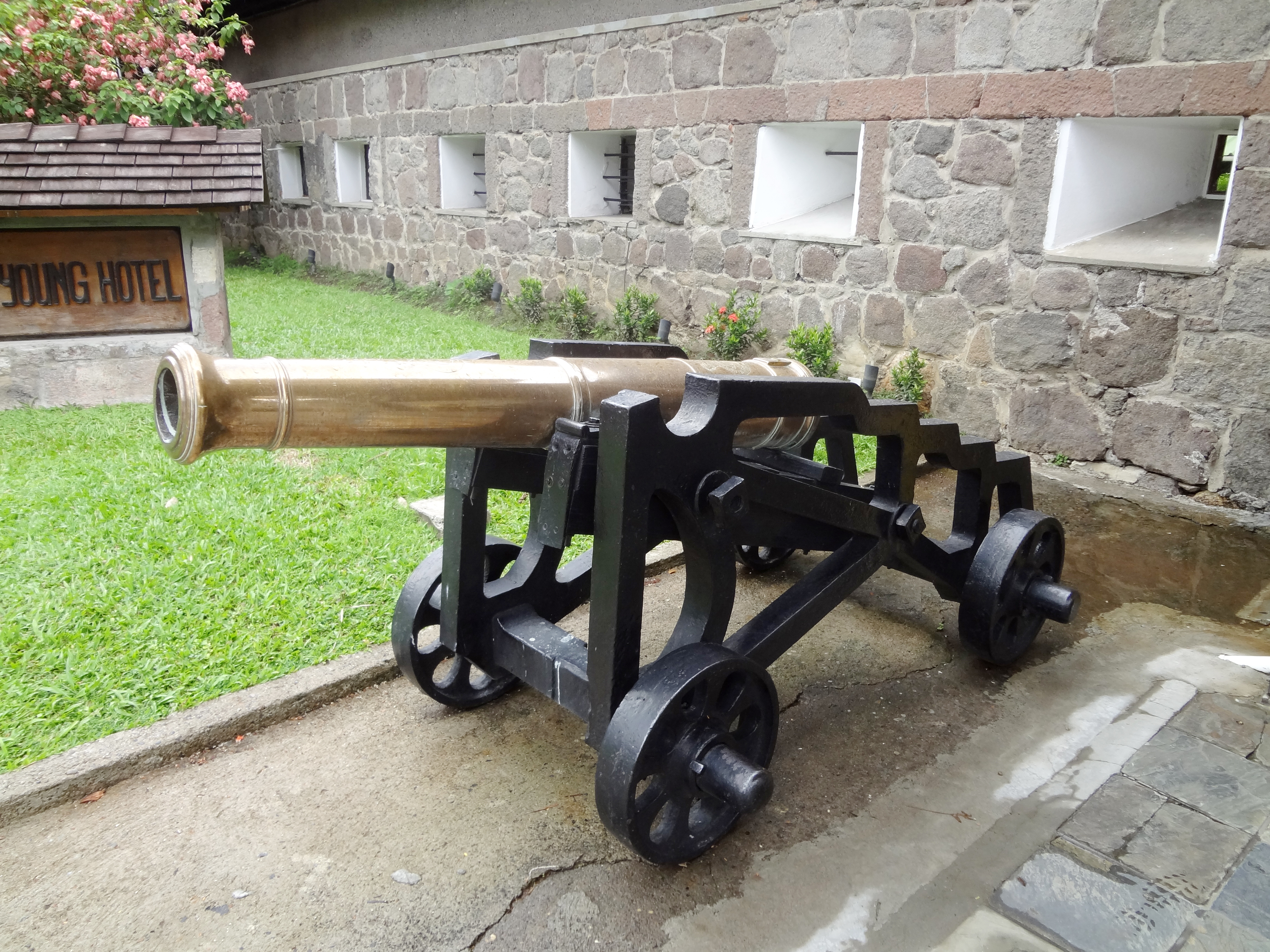
Cannon at the Fort Young Hotel entrance

=== 19th century to present ===
From the 1850s to 1960s, the fort was used as the headquarters of Dominica's police force. In 1964, Fort Young Hotel was built on the site. In 1979, Hurricane David destroyed a significant part of the fort's remains. The courtyard of the hotel retains the fort's original flagstone walkways. 19th-century cannons are located in the hotel's foyer and at the entrance is a large stone that was once used to mount horses. In 2023, hotel renovations included a new bar and lounge set in the fort's barracks, and a new fitness center at the level of the fort's ramparts and near the original flagpole.
