= Elections in Cyprus =

At the national level, the Republic of Cyprus holds elections for its head of state, the President of Cyprus, and for its legislature, the House of Representatives.

== Voters ==
Citizens aged 18 or older may vote in Presidential, legislative, local, and European Parliamentary elections. European Union citizens may also vote in local and European Parliamentary elections. In order to vote in legislative elections citizens must have lived in Cyprus for six months. In order to vote in local elections citizens or European Union citizens must reside in a municipality or community. In order to vote in European Parliamentary elections citizens or European Citizens must have resided in Cyprus or any other European Union country for six months. Voting by proxy is not allowed.

Formerly, the island's two communities, the Greek Cypriots and Turkish Cypriots voted in separate elections for the House of Representatives, where they elected different seats each requiring separate majorities for laws to pass, and Presidential elections where the Greek-Cypriot community elected the President and the Turkish Cypriot community elected the vice-president. In 1964 the Turkish Cypriots withdrew from participation in the country's government. Following the court case Aziz v. Cyprus in the European Court of Human Rights in 2004 Turkish Cypriots residing in the government-controlled areas of the island may register to vote.

== Electoral system ==
Elections are managed by the Central Elections Office which is part of the Ministry of Interior. The Permanent Secretary of the MoI serves as the General Returning Officer (GRO). At the district level, the permanent chief district officers act as District Returning Officers.

=== Presidential elections ===
Presidential elections are held every five years, with by elections held in case of a vacancy in the office to elect a president within a period of 45 days after the vacancy occurs until the next Presidential elections. In 2019 the constitution was amended to add a two consecutive terms limit.

Candidates for President must be citizens of the Republic of Cyprus over the age of 35 years who have not been accused of crimes relating to moral turpitude, who have not had their right to stand removed by a court prior to the elections and who are not mentally incapable of performing the duties of President.

The two-round system is used to elect the president. The candidate who receives a majority of valid votes is elected. If no candidate receives the required number of votes a runoff round is held in the corresponding day of the following week between the two candidates who received the largest number of votes where the candidate who receives the most votes is elected.

=== Legislative elections ===
Elections for the House of Representatives are held every five years. The age of candidacy was lowered from 25 to 21 through a constitutional amendment adopted unanimously in 2019.

Originally, the constitution provided there were 50 seats to the House of Representatives, with 35 (70%) allocated to the Greek Cypriot community and 15 (30%) allocated to the Turkish Cypriot community. In 1985 for the smooth running of the House a law was adopted raising the number of seats to 80, with the Greek Cypriots electing 56 and the Turkish Cypriots electing 24 (which remain vacant). The Maronite, Armenian, and Latin communities also elect three observer members.

Open list Proportional Representation is used to elect the House's members. Cyprus is split into six constituencies corresponding exactly to the six districts. The constituency of Nicosia elects 20 members, Limassol elects 12, Famagusta elects 11, Larnaca elects six, Paphos elects four and Kyrenia elects three. Voters vote for a list, which is either a party, coalition of parties, coalition of independents or a single independent candidate. They also have the option of casting preferential votes for candidates on the chosen list where they have one preferential vote for every four seats in their constituency, excluding decimals, or one preferential vote for constituencies with less than four seats. The candidates are ordered based on preferential votes with the exception of party leaders or leaders of parties in coalitions who are always ranked first and do not receive preferential votes. The first candidates ordered in this way corresponding to the number of seats awarded to their list in each respective constituency are declared elected.

Seats are allocated to lists in three distributions. In the first distribution, an electoral quota is calculated in each constituency by dividing the number of valid votes by the number of seats in that constituency, excluding decimals. Each list's votes are divided by the electoral quota to calculate how many seats the list receives, excluding decimals. A second distribution occurs when there are seats which have not been filled by the first allocation. For the purposes of the second distribution all of Cyprus is treated as a single constituency. Only parties receiving more than 3.6% of the vote, coalitions of two parties receiving more than 10% of the vote and coalitions of more than two parties receiving 20% of the vote may receive seats in the second distribution. Each list's "unused votes" (excluding those which did not reach the threshold) are calculated from each constituency by subtracting the list's seats multiplied by the electoral quota from the list's votes. The electoral quota for the second distribution is the total of each list's unused votes divided by the seats which were not allocated in the first allocation. Each list's unused votes are divided by the threshold to calculate how many seats the list receives from the second allocation. If any seats remain unallocated after the second distribution they are allocated to the lists with the most unused votes after the second distribution, excluding parties with less than 7.2% of the vote.

Seats allocated in the second and third allocation are distributed to lists in constituencies by ranking the parties based on their total votes and giving the lists a seat in the constituency where it had the most unused votes in the first allocation, assuming that constituency did not have all its seats filled previously, and this is repeated until every list's seats from the second and third allocations are allocated to constituencies.

== Latest elections ==
=== 2023 presidential election ===
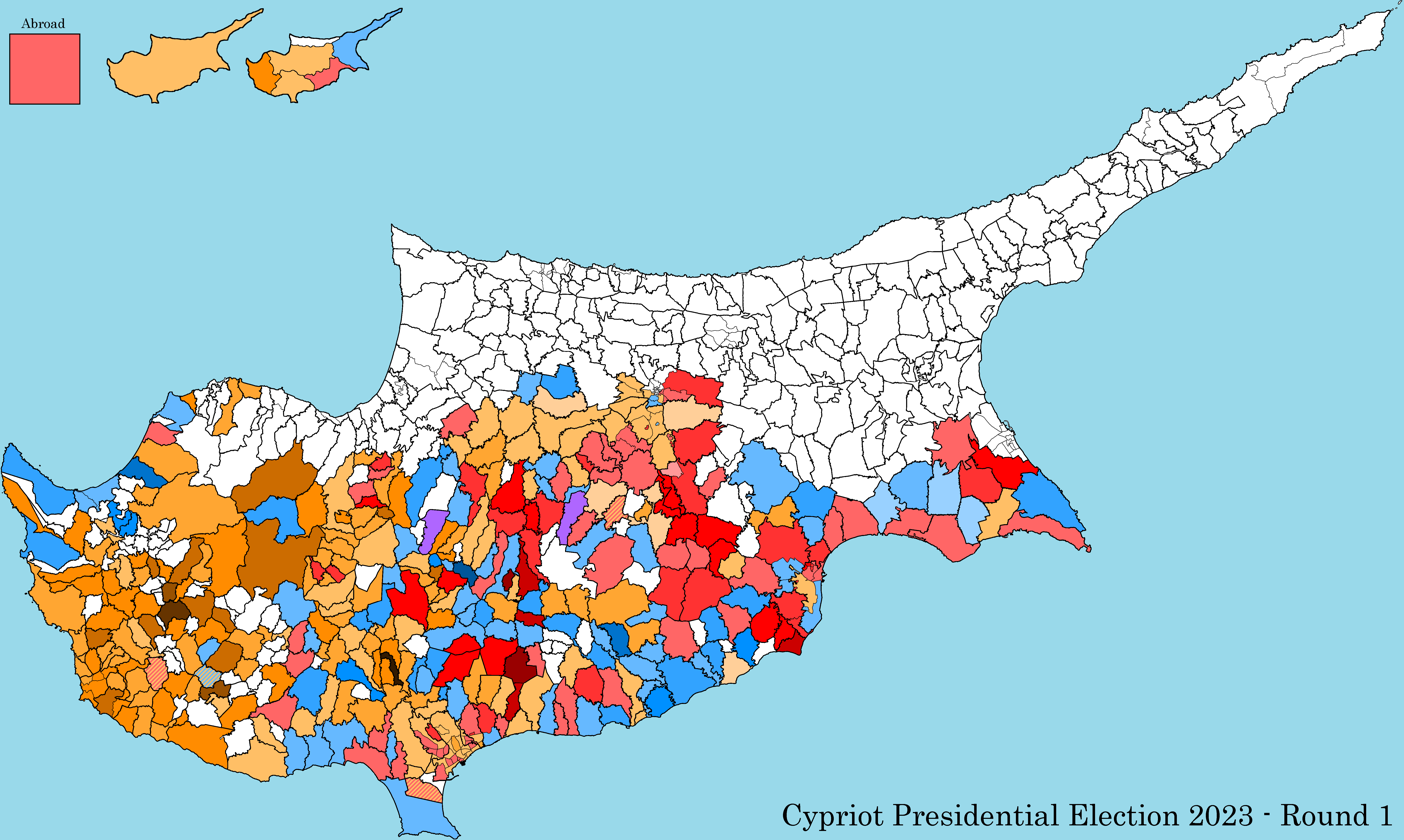
A map of the results of the first round.

Candidate	Party	First round		Second round	
Candidate	Party	Votes	%	Votes	%
Nikos Christodoulides	Independent (Note: Supported by DIKO, EDEK, DIPA, Solidarity, Active Citizens – United Cypriot Hunters Movement and Animal Party Cyprus)	127,309	32.04	204,867	51.97
Andreas Mavroyiannis	Independent (Note: Supported by AKEL and Generation Change)	117,551	29.59	189,335	48.03
Averof Neofytou	Democratic Rally	103,748	26.11		
Christos Christou	National Popular Front	23,988	6.04		
Achilleas Demetriades	Independent (Note: Supported by Famagusta for Cyprus)	8,137	2.05		
Constantinos Christofides	New Wave – The Other Cyprus	6,326	1.59		
Georgios Colocassides	Independent	5,287	1.33		
Alexios Savvides	Independent	2,395	0.60		
Charalampos Aristotelous	Independent	866	0.22		
Celestina de Petro	Independent	575	0.14		
Andronicos Zervides	Independent	341	0.09		
Ioulia Khovrina Komninou	United Cyprus Republican Party	330	0.08		
Andreas Efstratiou	Independent	299	0.08		
Loukas Stavrou	National Communitarian Reconstruction	165	0.04		
Total		397,317	100.00	394,202	100.00
Valid votes		397,317	98.27	394,202	96.95
Invalid votes		5,333	1.32	8,428	2.07
Blank votes		1,671	0.41	3,986	0.98
Total votes		404,321	100.00	406,616	100.00
Registered voters/turnout		561,273	72.04	561,273	72.45
Source: Central Electoral Service, Central Electoral Service

=== 2026 legislative election ===
Party	Votes	%	Seats	+/–
Democratic Rally	101,013	27.15	17	0
Progressive Party of Working People	88,777	23.86	15	0
National People's Front	40,567	10.90	8	+4
Democratic Party	37,222	10.00	8	–1
ALMA – Citizens for Cyprus	21,700	5.83	4	New
Direct Democracy Cyprus	20,159	5.42	4	New
EDEK Socialist Party	12,099	3.25	0	–4
Active Citizens – Movement of Cypriot United Hunters	11,890	3.20	0	0
Democratic Alignment	11,693	3.14	0	–4
Volt Cyprus	11,487	3.09	0	New
Movement of Ecologists – Citizens' Cooperation	7,264	1.95	0	–3
Democratic National Movement	2,628	0.71	0	New
Stand Up	1,897	0.51	0	New
Agronómos Agricultural Labour Party	1,044	0.28	0	New
Democratic Change	1,020	0.27	0	New
Green Party of Cyprus	509	0.14	0	New
Patriotic Front "Lacedaemonians"	494	0.13	0	New
Far-Left Resistance Communism	39	0.01	0	New
People's Struggle for Freedom	33	0.01	0	New
Independents	525	0.14	0	0
Total	372,060	100.00	56	0
Valid votes	372,060	97.69		
Invalid votes	6,621	1.74		
Blank votes	2,170	0.57		
Total votes	380,851	100.00		
Registered voters/turnout	569,182	66.91		
Source: Central Elections Service

== Past elections ==
The British colonial administration drafted a constitution for Cyprus a few years after Cyprus was bought from the Ottomans (1878). The legislative assembly was to have 9 Greek Cypriot members, 3 Turkish Cypriot members (all elected) and 6 British ex officio members. The vote of the British head of the assembly weighted more in case of a 50%-50% disagreement. Thus traditionally the Turkish Cypriot and British members would cooperate and pass legislation despite the disagreements of the Greek Cypriot members. In 1931 Necati Bey, a Turkish Cypriot supporter of Kemal Atatürk was elected (in previous years Turkish Cypriot members were hailed from the Ottoman ruling class). Necati Bey agreed with the Greek Cypriot members on several issues. This made the British governor, Sir Ronald Storrs to ignore the assembly when passing the bills. Angry Greek Cypriot members started a riot and the constitution was abolished.

The first municipal elections happened in 1943. Two of the winning mayors were members of AKEL: Ploutis Servas in Limassol and Adam Adamantos in Famagusta, and the other six where Greek nationalists. In 1946 the situation was reversed: 6 were either members or supported by AKEL, including Ioannis Klerides in Nicosia.

=== Presidential elections ===
The first presidential elections for independent Cyprus took place in 1960. The bulk of EOKA supporters were in favour of Makarios III, whereas AKEL backed Ioannis Kleridis (father of Glafkos Klerides). Klerides was also backed by independent politicians, both left wingers like Ploutis Servas and right wingers like Themistoklis Dervis. The Turkish Cypriot community elected Fazil Küçük for the position of vice president unopposed.

The next elections were due in 1965, but were postponed as a result of the extraordinary situation created by the intercommunal strife. The term of office was extended by a law of the House of Representatives.

President Makarios distanced himself from his earlier enosis convictions in his 1968 presidential campaign and argued for the independence of Cyprus. He declared that Enosis was wishable but independence was possible. His opponent was the psychiatrist Takis Evdokas who was campaigning for Enosis. Makarios won the election. Turkish Cypriots were not participating in the government (see Cyprus dispute) but they had separate elections were Fazil Küçük was reelected as vice president.

In 1973, Makarios was reelected unopposed.

Following the death of Makarios in 1977, the then President of the House of Representatives, Spyros Kyprianou, assumed duties temporarily until 1978 elections.

In the 1978 election, Glafkos Klerides was backed by his party, Democratic Rally whereas Spyros Kyprianou was backed by the other Greek Cypriot parties. Following the kidnapping of Kyprianou's son, Achilleas, Klerides did not run for the election and Kyprianou won.

In 1983, Kyprianou's Democratic Party forged an alliance with AKEL based on an agreed agenda: the so-called minimum program. Kyprianou was reelected in the presidential elections of that year. He was opposed by Glafcos Clerides, the leader of the right-wing Democratic Rally party and Vassos Lyssarides of the Socialist party, EDEK.

By 1985, AKEL was not satisfied with Kyprianou's policies, especially his position in negotiations (see Cyprus dispute for more) and the partnership collapsed. AKEL found its new candidate for the 1988 election in George Vasiliou who managed to get to the second round of elections together with Glafkos Klerides. Kyprianou did not get enough votes. With the added support of EDEK, whose candidate Vasos Lyssaridis did not do very well in the first round, Vasiliou won the second round.

While the Democratic Rally had been supporting Vasiliou in negotiating the Ghali set of ideas, as the 1993 elections were approaching it started criticising Vasiliou for not demanding enough. At the same time a partnership of Kyprianou's democratic party and Lyssaridis's EDEK was rejecting the spirit of the Ghali ideas all together and argued that both Vasiliou and Klerides were equally willing to compromise. The partnership received strong support by the Church and its candidate was Paschalis Paschalidis.

Paschalidis did not make it to the second round, however the democratic party made an agreement with Klerides and supported him. Thus Klerides was elected in 1993, defeating George Vassiliou, who again ran as an Independent candidate supported by AKEL and ADISOK, forming a government with members of both Democratic Rally and the Democratic Party.

The main issue of the 1998 election campaign was the purchase of S-300 antiaircraft missiles from Russia. Klerides was backed by EDEK whereas the democratic party and AKEL were backing George Iacovou, ex minister in the Kyprianou and Vasiliou governments. Klerides won the election.

For the 2003 election, EDEK leader Yiannakis Omirou declared himself candidate and the democratic rally initially backed him. Because of the course of negotiations Clerides asked to remain president for another couple of years, so the democratic rally backed him. This made EDEK turn to the opposition coalition already formed between AKEL and Democratic Party. The leader of the latter, Tassos Papadopoulos was chosen as a candidate. In the meantime the attorney general Alekos Markides disagreed with his party, Democratic Rally and ran as an independent candidate. Papadopoulos won from the first round.

=== Parliamentary elections ===
The 1960 parliamentary elections were contested by three parties and a number of independent candidates. The right-wing "Patriot Front" won 30 seats, left-wing AKEL won five seats while the Pancyprian Union of Fighters did not win any seats. No parliamentary elections were held in 1965 because of the prevailing intercommunal tension.

Five parties contested the 5 July 1970 elections. Three of these, the Unified Party, the Progressive Front, and the opposition Democratic National Party, were right-wing; one, the Unified Democratic Union of Centre (EDEK), of the centre; and the other, AKEL, left-wing.

The third parliamentary elections took place on 5 September 1976, two years after the Turkish invasion. It was contested by the Democratic Rally, the Democratic Front (Democratic Party), socialist EDEK and left-wing AKEL. The right-wing Democratic Rally received about 26% of the votes, but due to a coalition ranged against it, was left with no Deputies.

The fourth parliamentary elections took place on 24 May 1981. The elections were contested by the right-wing Democratic Rally, the centre Democratic Party, the New Democratic Front and the Union of Centre, socialist EDEK and left-wing AKEL and PAME.

In the above election, a type of proportional system with threshold was used.

The fifth parliamentary elections took place on 8 December 1985. Following a law passed by the House of Representatives the number of seats allocated to the Greek Cypriot community was increased from 35 to 56. The number of Turkish Cypriot seats was raised from 15 to 24.

The elections were contested by four parties - the right-wing Democratic Rally, the centre Democratic Party, the socialist EDEK and left-wing AKEL - as well as independent candidates.

Vassos Lyssarides, leader of socialist party EDEK, was elected House President. His candidature was supported by his party and by the Democratic Party.

The sixth parliamentary elections took place on 19 May 1991. They were contested by the following political parties or party groupings - the Democratic Rally Party in coalition with the Liberal Party, the Democratic Party, the Socialist Party EDEK, AKEL-Left-New Forces Party and two new parties the Refugee Movement (PAKOP) and the Reformed Left (ADISOK), a splinter group from AKEL.

Alexis Galanos (Democratic Party) was elected House President with the joint votes of the Democratic Party and the Democratic Rally - Liberals coalition.

The seventh parliamentary elections took place on 26 May 1996. They were held under a newly adopted system of proportional representation according to which a party receiving 1/56 of the valid votes or (1,79%) elected a House member. The new voting system encouraged the participation of more parties in the elections. The following political parties took part in the 1996 elections - the Democratic Rally - Liberal Party coalition, the New Horizons Party, the Democratic Party, the Movement of Free Democrats (of former President Vassiliou), the Ecologist Movement, the Socialist Party EDEK, the new Left (ADISOK) and the AKEL-Left-New Forces Party.

Spyros Kyprianou was elected House President.

== Referendums ==
The constitution of Cyprus makes no reference to holding referendums (as of 2013). The only referendum to take place in Cyprus post-independence was a referendum on the Annan Plan which was held both in the Republic of Cyprus and the breakaway Turkish Republic of Northern Cyprus on 24 April 2004. In 1950, before Cypriot independence, a referendum was held on Enosis (union with Greece), which was unofficial and held in Greek Orthodox churches.

== See also ==
- Elections in Northern Cyprus
- Electoral calendar
- Electoral system
- Politics of Cyprus
- House of Representatives of Cyprus
- List of elections in 2023
