= Opinion polling for the 2023 Cypriot presidential election =

In the run up to the 2023 Cypriot presidential election, various organisations carried out opinion polling to gauge voting intention in Cyprus. Results of such polls are displayed in this article. The date range for these opinion polls is from 9 May 2022 to 26 January 2023.

Poll results are listed in the tables below in reverse chronological order, showing the most recent first and using the date the survey's fieldwork was done, as opposed to the date of publication. If such date is unknown, the date of publication is given instead. The first line lists the actual election results for the first round, on 5 February 2023. The highest percentage figure in each polling survey is displayed in bold, and the background shaded in the leading party's colour. In the instance that there is a tie, then no figure is shaded. The lead column on the right shows the percentage-point difference between the two candidates with the highest figures. When a specific poll does not show a data figure for a candidate, the candidate's cell corresponding to that poll is shown empty.

== First round ==
=== Graphical Summary ===
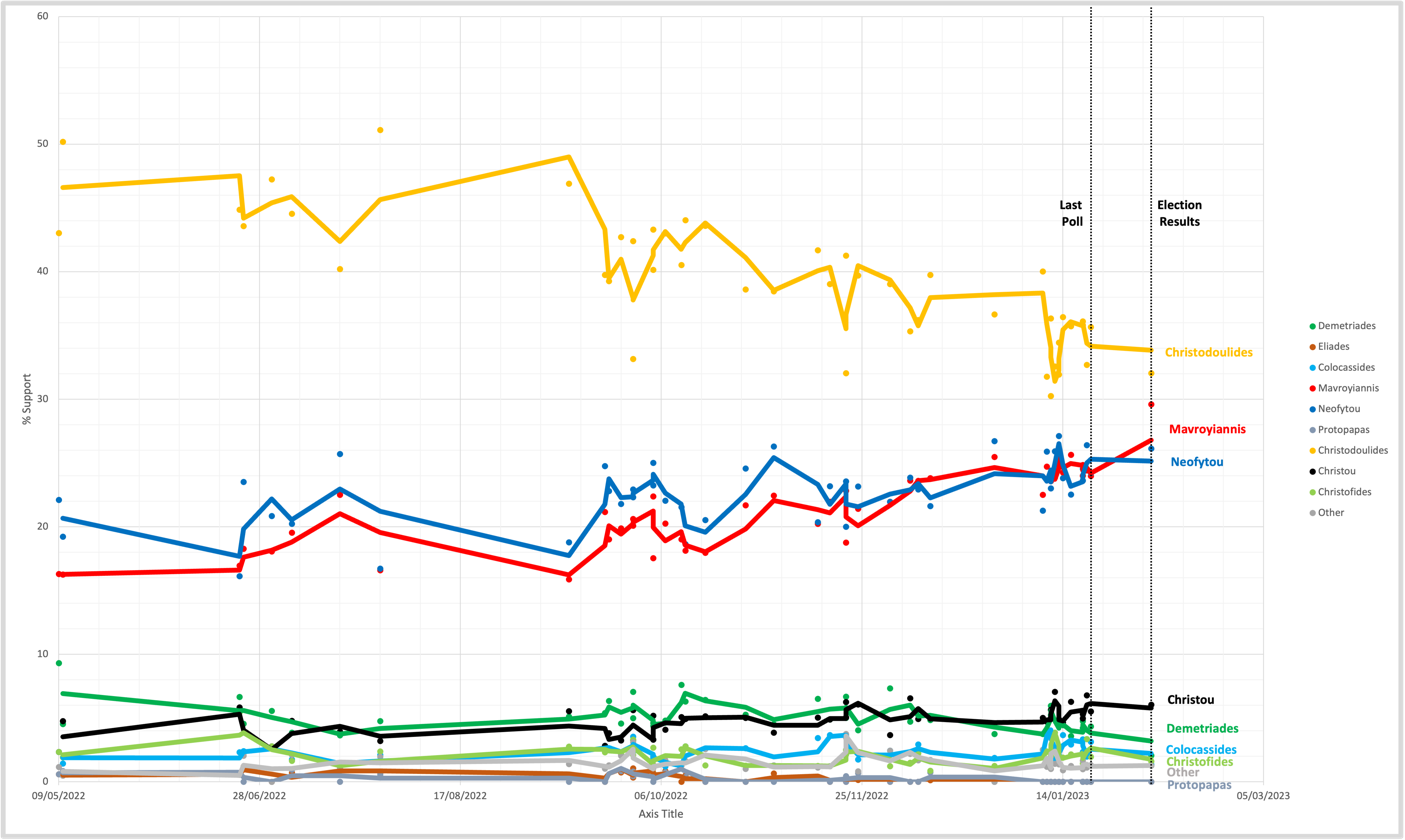

=== Table ===
Fieldwork date	Polling firm	Sample size	Demetriades Independent-FFC	Eliades (Note: Marios Eliades withdrew his candidacy on 2 January 2023) Independent	Colocassides Independent	Mavroyiannis Independent-AKEL, GC	Neofytou DISY	Protopapas (Note: Christodoulos Protopapas withdrew his candidacy on 28 December 2022) Independent	Christodoulides Independent-DIKO, EDEK, DIPA, KA	Christou ELAM	Christofides NW	Other	Lead
5 February 2023	2023 presidential election	-	2.05	-	1.33	**29.59**	26.11	-	32.04	6.04	1.59	1.25	**2.45**
20–26 Jan 2023	Noverna	854	3.33	-	1.97	24.41	**26.39**	-	32.68	6.78	3.33	1.11	6.29
19–26 Jan 2023	IMR	1000	4.75	-	2.32	**24.83**	23.62	-	36.09	5.30	1.43	1.66	11.26
21–25 Jan 2023	Symmetron	1001	4.32	-	3.13	23.97	**24.19**	-	35.64	5.51	1.94	1.30	11.45
16–24 Jan 2023	Rai Consultants	1308	3.58	-	2.91	**25.64**	22.51	-	35.72	6.27	2.13	1.23	10.08
13–24 Jan 2023	Prime Consulting	1475	4.55	-	2.05	25.00	**25.91**	-	34.43	4.89	1.82	1.36	8.52
19–23 Jan 2023	Symmetron	1003	4.20	-	3.31	23.98	**24.53**	-	35.80	4.97	2.21	0.99	11.27
13–23 Jan 2023	CMRC	1644	4.82	-	2.41	25.30	**27.11**	-	31.93	4.82	1.81	1.81	4.82
10–21 Jan 2023	Μetron Analysis	800	4.71	-	4.71	24.71	**25.88**	-	31.76	4.71	2.35	1.18	5.88
14–19 Jan 2023	Symmetron	1200	4.43	-	3.65	**24.25**	23.81	-	36.43	4.65	1.88	0.89	12.18
12–19 Jan 2023	Noverna	862	3.59	-	1.79	23.85	**25.90**	-	32.56	7.05	3.85	1.41	6.66
11–17 Jan 2023	Analytica	7094	5.94	-	3.40	23.57	**23.99**	-	30.25	5.63	3.82	3.40	6.26
11–16 Jan 2023	Symmetron	1200	5.22	-	3.44	**24.00**	23.00	-	36.33	5.00	2.00	1.00	12.33
9–16 Jan 2023	CYMAR	1012	3.75	-	2.50	**22.50**	21.25	-	40.00	5.00	2.50	2.50	17.50
9–12 Jan 2023	Symmetron	800	5.59	-	2.91	**23.58**	22.91	-	36.20	4.92	2.23	1.68	12.62
28–30 Dec 2022 & 2–7 Jan 2023	CMRC	1250	3.73	-	1.86	25.47	**26.71**	-	36.65	4.35	1.24	-	9.94
12–19 Dec 2022	Rai Consultants	1034	4.83	0.12	1.69	**23.79**	21.62	0.72	39.73	4.95	0.85	1.69	15.94
7–15 Dec 2022	Prime Consulting	1080	4.70	-	2.29	23.62	**23.85**	-	35.32	6.54	1.49	2.18	11.47
2–9 Dec 2022	Symmetron	808	7.32	-	2.44	**21.95**	**21.95**	-	39.02	3.66	1.22	2.44	17.07
24 Nov–4 Dec 2022	Noverna	877	4.04	0.13	1.75	21.40	**23.15**	0.67	39.70	6.06	2.29	0.81	16.55
21 Nov–2 Dec 2022	CYMAR	1006	5.00	-	2.50	18.75	**20.00**	-	41.25	6.25	2.50	3.75	21.25
21–28 Nov 2022	Analytica	5160	6.67	0.22	3.66	22.80	**23.55**	0.43	32.04	5.05	2.15	3.44	8.49
17–26 Nov 2022	Metron Analysis	808	4.88	-	3.66	21.95	**23.17**	-	39.02	4.88	1.22	1.22	15.85
14–18 Nov 2022	Rai Consultants	1004	6.50	0.25	3.43	20.22	**20.34**	0.25	41.67	5.02	1.23	1.10	21.33
3–13 Nov 2022	CMRC	1247	4.49	0.64	1.28	22.44	**26.28**	-	38.46	3.85	1.28	1.28	12.18
7–11 Nov 2022	IMR	1000	4.79	0.84	1.20	20.24	**22.04**	0.72	42.99	4.07	1.44	1.68	20.95
27 Oct–3 Nov 2022	Prime Consulting	1009	5.26	-	2.63	21.68	**24.56**	-	38.60	5.01	1.25	1.00	14.04
17–27 Oct 2022	CYMAR	1004	6.41	-	2.56	17.95	**20.51**	-	43.59	5.13	1.28	2.56	23.08
4–22 Oct 2022	Noverna	1240	4.38	0.40	1.86	17.53	**23.24**	0.40	43.29	5.18	2.66	1.06	20.05
12–18 Oct 2022	Rai Consultants	1013	6.29	0.50	2.77	18.11	**18.62**	0.38	44.03	4.91	2.77	1.64	25.41
11–15 Oct 2022	Pulse	800	7.59	-	1.27	18.99	**21.52**	1.27	40.51	5.06	2.53	1.27	18.99
4–14 Oct 2022	CMRC	1224	4.61	0.66	1.97	22.37	**25.00**	-	40.13	3.29	0.66	1.32	15.13
26 Sep–9 Oct 2022	IMR	1000	4.55	0.72	2.15	19.86	**21.77**	0.84	42.70	3.23	2.15	2.03	20.93
29 Sep–6 Oct 2022	Symmetron	800	4.99	1.05	2.36	20.08	**22.31**	0.79	42.39	3.28	2.10	0.66	20.08
29 Sep–3 Oct 2022	Analytica	5403	7.05	0.33	3.52	20.59	**22.91**	0.44	33.15	5.62	3.30	3.08	10.24
23 Sep–3 Oct 2022	Metron Analysis	804	6.33	1.27	2.53	18.99	**22.78**	1.27	39.24	3.80	2.53	1.27	16.46
22–28 Sep 2022	Prime Consulting	1018	5.38	-	2.82	21.15	**24.74**	-	39.74	2.82	2.31	1.03	15.00
13–19 Sep 2022	Rai Consultants	1000	5.10	0.55	2.48	15.86	**18.76**	-	46.90	5.52	2.76	1.38	28.14
28 Jul–3 Aug 2022	Rai Consultants	1009	4.74	0.70	2.09	16.57	16.71	0.56	51.11	3.20	2.37	1.95	34.40
18–29 Jul 2022	CMRC	850	3.63	1.02	1.16	22.50	**25.69**	-	40.20	3.92	0.87	1.02	14.51
6–12 Jul 2022	IMR	1000	3.84	0.70	1.74	19.53	**20.23**	0.93	44.53	4.77	1.63	2.09	24.30
1–7 Jul 2022	Symmetron	800	5.56	-	2.78	18.06	**20.83**	-	47.22	2.78	2.78	-	26.39
24–30 Jun 2022	Prime Consulting	1003	4.53	1.19	2.39	18.26	**23.51**	-	43.56	2.27	2.27	2.03	20.05
23–28 Jun 2022	Rai Consultants	1006	6.64	0.68	2.30	**16.94**	16.12	0.68	44.85	5.83	5.42	0.54	27.91
9–16 May 2022	Prime Consulting	1014	9.30	0.58	2.33	16.28	**22.09**	0.58	43.02	2.33	2.33	1.16	20.93
10–13 May 2022	IMR	1000	4.51	0.47	1.42	16.25	**19.22**	0.83	50.18	4.74	1.90	0.47	30.96

== Second round ==
=== Averof Neofytou – Nikos Christodoulides ===
Fieldwork date	Polling firm	Sample size	Neofytou DISY	Christodoulides Independent-DIKO, EDEK, DIPA, KA
20–26 Jan 2023	Noverna	854	38.89	61.11
19–26 Jan 2023	IMR	1000	35.00	65.00
21–25 Jan 2023	Symmetron	1001	36.36	63.64
16–24 Jan 2023	Rai Consultants	1308	38.45	61.55
13–24 Jan 2023	Prime Consulting	1475	41.56	58.44
19–23 Jan 2023	Symmetron	1003	36.84	63.16
13–23 Jan 2023	CMRC	1644	42.45	57.55
10–21 Jan 2023	Μetron Analysis	800	40.00	60.00
14–19 Jan 2023	Symmetron	1200	33.78	66.22
12–19 Jan 2023	Noverna	862	37.50	62.50
11–17 Jan 2023	Analytica	7094	46.05	53.95
11–16 Jan 2023	Symmetron	1200	33.78	66.22
9–16 Jan 2023	CYMAR	1012	35.14	64.86
9–12 Jan 2023	Symmetron	800	33.33	66.67
28–30 Dec 2022 & 2–7 Jan 2023	CMRC	1250	40.14	59.86
12–19 Dec 2022	Rai Consultants	1034	33.42	66.58
7–15 Dec 2022	Prime Consulting	1080	39.19	60.81
2–9 Dec 2022	Symmetron	808	30.14	69.86
24 Nov–4 Dec 2022	Noverna	877	32.88	67.12
21 Nov–2 Dec 2022	CYMAR	1006	27.78	72.22
21–28 Nov 2022	Analytica	5160	44.59	55.41
17–26 Nov 2022	Metron Analysis	808	35.71	64.29
14–18 Nov 2022	Rai Consultants	1004	31.51	68.49
3–13 Nov 2022	CMRC	1247	35.56	64.44
7–11 Nov 2022	IMR	1000	28.05	71.95
27 Oct–3 Nov 2022	Prime Consulting	1009	33.78	66.22
17–27 Oct 2022	CYMAR	1004	30.67	69.33
4–22 Oct 2022	Noverna	1240	28.95	71.05
12–18 Oct 2022	Rai Consultants	1013	27.42	72.58
11–15 Oct 2022	Pulse	800	31.58	68.42
4–14 Oct 2022	CMRC	1224	33.58	66.42
26 Sep–9 Oct 2022	IMR	1000	27.50	72.50
29 Sep–6 Oct 2022	Symmetron	800	30.56	69.44
29 Sep–3 Oct 2022	Analytica	5403	40.54	59.46
22–28 Sep 2022	Prime Consulting	1018	32.88	67.12
13–19 Sep 2022	Rai Consultants	1000	23.79	76.21
28 Jul–3 Aug 2022	Rai Consultants	1009	22.88	77.12
6–12 Jul 2022	IMR	1000	25.00	75.00
1–7 Jul 2022	Symmetron	800	25.97	74.03
24–30 Jun 2022	Prime Consulting	1003	33.33	66.67
23–28 Jun 2022	Rai Consultants	1006	23.25	76.75
9–16 May 2022	Prime Consulting	1014	35.53	64.47
10–13 May 2022	IMR	1000	23.33	76.67

View source data.

=== Andreas Mavroyiannis – Nikos Christodoulides ===
Fieldwork date	Polling firm	Sample size	Mavroyiannis Independent-AKEL, GC	Christodoulides Independent-DIKO, EDEK, DIPA, KA
5 February 2023	2023 presidential election	-	48.08	51.92
20–26 Jan 2023	Noverna	854	35.62	64.38
19–26 Jan 2023	IMR	1000	38.75	61.25
21–25 Jan 2023	Symmetron	1001	36.59	63.41
16–24 Jan 2023	Rai Consultants	1308	39.37	60.63
13–24 Jan 2023	Prime Consulting	1475	40.00	60.00
19–23 Jan 2023	Symmetron	1003	36.71	63.29
13–23 Jan 2023	CMRC	1644	37.68	62.32
10–21 Jan 2023	Μetron Analysis	800	41.03	58.97
14–19 Jan 2023	Symmetron	1200	35.53	64.47
12–19 Jan 2023	Noverna	862	36.99	63.01
11–17 Jan 2023	Analytica	7094	49.37	50.63
11–16 Jan 2023	Symmetron	1200	36.84	63.16
9–16 Jan 2023	CYMAR	1012	35.44	64.56
9–12 Jan 2023	Symmetron	800	37.97	62.03
28–30 Dec 2022 & 2–7 Jan 2023	CMRC	1250	37.24	62.76
12–19 Dec 2022	Rai Consultants	1034	37.05	62.95
7–15 Dec 2022	Prime Consulting	1080	37.97	62.03
2–9 Dec 2022	Symmetron	808	36.36	63.64
24 Nov–4 Dec 2022	Noverna	877	28.00	72.00
21 Nov–2 Dec 2022	CYMAR	1006	32.50	67.50
21–28 Nov 2022	Analytica	5160	47.50	52.50
17–26 Nov 2022	Metron Analysis	808	32.47	67.53
14–18 Nov 2022	Rai Consultants	1004	33.73	66.27
3–13 Nov 2022	CMRC	1247	34.29	65.71
7–11 Nov 2022	IMR	1000	29.27	70.73
27 Oct–3 Nov 2022	Prime Consulting	1009	32.05	67.95
17–27 Oct 2022	CYMAR	1004	31.25	68.75
4–22 Oct 2022	Noverna	1240	27.27	72.73
12–18 Oct 2022	Rai Consultants	1013	29.83	70.17
11–15 Oct 2022	Pulse	800	32.50	67.50
4–14 Oct 2022	CMRC	1224	30.94	69.06
26 Sep–9 Oct 2022	IMR	1000	27.71	72.29
29 Sep–6 Oct 2022	Symmetron	800	31.17	68.83
29 Sep–3 Oct 2022	Analytica	5403	44.30	55.70
22–28 Sep 2022	Prime Consulting	1018	31.94	68.06
13–19 Sep 2022	Rai Consultants	1000	27.45	72.55
27 Jul–3 Aug 2022	Rai Consultants	1009	25.75	74.25
6–12 Jul 2022	IMR	1000	25.29	74.71
1–7 Jul 2022	Symmetron	800	27.27	72.73
24–30 Jun 2022	Prime Consulting	1003	29.11	70.89
23–28 Jun 2022	Rai Consultants	1006	28.36	71.64
9–16 May 2022	Prime Consulting	1014	29.63	70.37
10–13 May 2022	IMR	1000	26.09	73.91

View source data.

=== Averof Neofytou – Andreas Mavroyiannis ===
Fieldwork date	Polling firm	Sample size	Neofytou DISY	Mavroyiannis Independent-AKEL, GC
20–26 Jan 2023	Noverna	854	51.43	48.57
19–26 Jan 2023	IMR	1000	47.22	52.78
21–25 Jan 2023	Symmetron	1001	48.05	51.95
16–24 Jan 2023	Rai Consultants	1308	45.44	54.56
13–24 Jan 2023	Prime Consulting	1475	49.33	50.67
19–23 Jan 2023	Symmetron	1003	47.30	52.70
13–23 Jan 2023	CMRC	1644	50.00	50.00
10–21 Jan 2023	Μetron Analysis	800	48.72	51.28
14–19 Jan 2023	Symmetron	1200	46.48	53.52
12–19 Jan 2023	Noverna	862	49.30	50.70
11–17 Jan 2023	Analytica	7094	48.05	51.95
11–16 Jan 2023	Symmetron	1200	45.07	54.93
9–16 Jan 2023	CYMAR	1012	49.30	50.70
9–12 Jan 2023	Symmetron	800	46.58	53.42
28–30 Dec 2022 & 2–7 Jan 2023	CMRC	1250	51.11	48.89
12–19 Dec 2022	Rai Consultants	1034	43.54	56.46
7–15 Dec 2022	Prime Consulting	1080	50.00	50.00
2–9 Dec 2022	Symmetron	808	44.12	55.88
24 Nov–4 Dec 2022	Noverna	877	50.77	49.23
21 Nov–2 Dec 2022	CYMAR	1006	43.06	56.94
21–28 Nov 2022	Analytica	5160	49.32	50.68
17–26 Nov 2022	Metron Analysis	808	47.89	52.11
14–18 Nov 2022	Rai Consultants	1004	43.14	56.86
3–13 Nov 2022	CMRC	1247	50.39	49.61
7–11 Nov 2022	IMR	1000	48.65	51.35
27 Oct–3 Nov 2022	Prime Consulting	1009	51.43	48.57
17–27 Oct 2022	CYMAR	1004	45.83	54.17
4–22 Oct 2022	Noverna	1240	50.00	50.00
12–18 Oct 2022	Rai Consultants	1013	47.38	52.62
11–15 Oct 2022	Pulse	800	47.30	52.70
4–14 Oct 2022	CMRC	1224	50.39	49.61
26 Sep–9 Oct 2022	IMR	1000	48.68	51.32
29 Sep–6 Oct 2022	Symmetron	800	50.00	50.00
29 Sep–3 Oct 2022	Analytica	5403	50.70	49.30
22–28 Sep 2022	Prime Consulting	1018	50.77	49.23
13–19 Sep 2022	Rai Consultants	1000	44.25	55.75
27 Jul–3 Aug 2022	Rai Consultants	1009	44.52	55.48
6–12 Jul 2022	IMR	1000	46.58	53.42
1–7 Jul 2022	Symmetron	800	47.89	52.11
24–30 Jun 2022	Prime Consulting	1003	50.70	49.30
23–28 Jun 2022	Rai Consultants	1006	40.67	59.33
9–16 May 2022	Prime Consulting	1014	51.35	48.65
10–13 May 2022	IMR	1000	49.32	50.68

View source data.
