= President of Cyprus =

Head of state and government

President of the Republic of Cyprus
- Πρόεδρος της Κυπριακής Δημοκρατίας (Greek); Kıbrıs Cumhuriyeti Cumhurbaşkanı (Turkish)
- Presidential standard of Cyprus

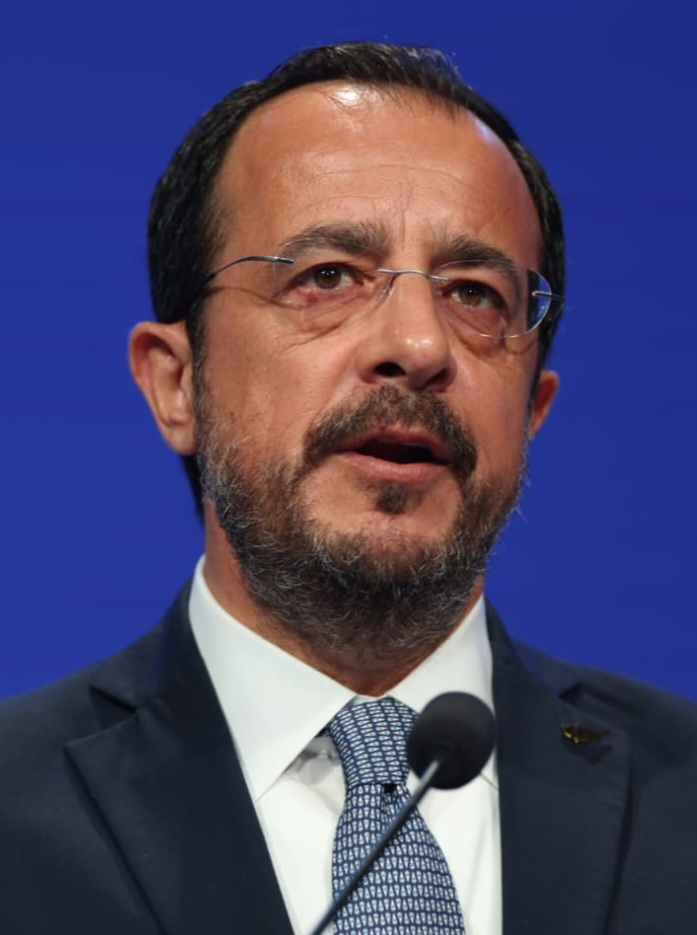
- Incumbent; Nikos Christodoulides since 28 February 2023
- Executive branch of the Government of Cyprus
- Style: Mr President (informal); His Excellency (diplomatic)
- Status: Head of state Head of government Commander-in-chief
- Member of: European Council
- Residence: Presidential Palace, Presidential Cottage (Troodos)
- Seat: Nicosia, Cyprus
- Appointer: Popular vote
- Term length: Five years, renewable once consecutively
- Constituting instrument: Cypriot Constitution (1960)
- Formation: 16 August 1960; 66 years ago
- First holder: Makarios III
- Deputy: Vice President of Cyprus (de jure); President of the House of Representatives (de facto)
- Salary: €132,000 annually
- Website: www.presidency.gov.cy

The president of Cyprus, officially the president of the Republic of Cyprus, (Note: Greek: Πρόεδρος της Κυπριακής Δημοκρατίας, romanized: Próedros tis Kypriakís Dimokratías; Turkish: Kıbrıs Cumhuriyeti Cumhurbaşkanı) is the head of state and the head of government of Cyprus, as well as the commander-in-chief of the Cypriot National Guard. The office was established by the Constitution of 1960, after Cyprus gained its independence from the United Kingdom.

The combination of the role of head of state and that of head of government is unique among member states of the European Union, making Cyprus the only EU state with a full presidential system of government.

The constitution, which was negotiated during the London and Zürich Agreements that divided power between the Greek Cypriot community and Turkish Cypriot community, requires the president to be a Greek Cypriot. Other requirements are that the officeholder must be over the age of thirty-five and elected directly in a two-round system. The president's term lasts for five years, and in accordance with the thirteenth amendment to the constitution, no person can serve more than two consecutive terms.

Nikos Christodoulides is the eighth and current president of Cyprus, having assumed office on 28 February 2023.

== Powers and limitations ==
According to the Constitution, the president of the Republic is the head of state, and is elected for a five year term through direct, universal and secret ballot.

Among the most important powers granted to the president of the Republic by the Constitution, are the power to put into effect laws passed by the House of Representatives or the right of veto to prevent legislation passed by the House from being enacted, if a given law concerns issues of the external policy, security and defence of the Republic, the right to refer such legislation back to the legislative body, as well as the right to refer it to the Supreme Court for the purposes of checking its constitutionality.

In addition, the president convenes the meetings of the Council of Ministers and draws up their agenda, while maintaining the right of veto for council meetings as well, provided that they concern issues of external policy, security and defence of the Republic, as well as the right to refer them back to the aforementioned body.

Today, under the doctrine of necessity, the president appoints eleven ministers, who constitute the country's Cabinet, and with the exception of the powers reserved by the constitution explicitly for the president and vice president of the Republic, exercise the executive authority of the state.

Furthermore, the Constitution grants the president the power to unilaterally appoint independent state officials and Supreme Court judges.

There are two ways for the president of the Republic to be removed from office. In the first case, they must be convicted by the Supreme Court for high treason, following prosecution by the prosecutor general and the deputy prosecutor general, which has to be approved by a resolution of at least three-quarters of members of parliament. In the second case, they must be convicted of a dishonorable offense or an offense of moral turpitude, following prosecution by the prosecutor general and the deputy prosecutor general, which has to be approved by the president of the Supreme Court.

== List of officeholders ==
Key

^{§} Elected unopposed
† Died in office

No.	Portrait	Name (Birth–Death)	Term			Political Party	Elected
No.	Portrait	Name (Birth–Death)	Took office	Left office	Time in office	Political Party	Elected
1	Makarios III	Archbishop; Makarios III (1913–1977)	16 August 1960	15 July 1974 (deposed)	13 years, 333 days	Independent	1959; 1968; 1973^{[§]}
–	Nikos Sampson	Nikos Sampson (1935–2001); Acting; De facto	15 July 1974	23 July 1974	8 days	Progressive Front	–
–	Glafcos Clerides	Glafcos Clerides (1919–2013); Acting	23 July 1974	7 December 1974	137 days	Eniaion	–
(1)	Makarios III	Archbishop; Makarios III (1913–1977)	7 December 1974 (restored)	3 August 1977 †	2 years, 239 days	Independent	–
2	Spyros Kyprianou	Spyros Kyprianou (1932–2002); Acting until 3 September 1977	3 August 1977	28 February 1988	10 years, 209 days	DIKO	1977^{[§]} 1978^{[§]} 1983
3	George Vassiliou	George Vassiliou (1931–2026)	28 February 1988	28 February 1993	5 years	Independent	1988
4	Glafcos Clerides	Glafcos Clerides (1919–2013)	28 February 1993	28 February 2003	10 years	DISY	1993; 1998
5	Tassos Papadopoulos	Tassos Papadopoulos (1934–2008)	28 February 2003	28 February 2008	5 years	DIKO	2003
6	Demetris Christofias	Demetris Christofias (1946–2019)	28 February 2008	28 February 2013	5 years	AKEL	2008
7	Nicos Anastasiades	Nicos Anastasiades (born 1946)	28 February 2013	28 February 2023	10 years	DISY	2013; 2018
8	Nikos Christodoulides	Nikos Christodoulides (born 1973)	28 February 2023	Incumbent	3 years, 258 days	Independent	2023

== Latest election ==
Candidate	Party	First round		Second round	
Candidate	Party	Votes	%	Votes	%
Nikos Christodoulides	Independent (Note: Supported by DIKO, EDEK, DIPA, Solidarity, KEKK and APC.)	127,309	32.04	204,867	51.97
Andreas Mavroyiannis	Independent (Note: Supported by AKEL and Generation Change.)	117,551	29.59	189,335	48.03
Averof Neofytou	Democratic Rally	103,748	26.11		
Christos Christou	National Popular Front	23,988	6.04		
Achilleas Demetriades	Independent (Note: Supported by Famagusta for Cyprus)	8,137	2.05		
Constantinos Christofides	New Wave – The Other Cyprus	6,326	1.59		
Georgios Colocassides	Independent	5,287	1.33		
Alexios Savvides	Independent	2,395	0.60		
Charalampos Aristotelous	Independent	866	0.22		
Celestina de Petro	Independent	575	0.14		
Andronicos Zervides	Independent	341	0.09		
Ioulia Khovrina Komninou	United Republican Party of Cyprus	330	0.08		
Andreas Efstratiou	Independent	299	0.08		
Loukas Stavrou	National Communitarian Reconstruction	165	0.04		
Total		397,317	100.00	394,202	100.00
Valid votes		397,317	98.27	394,202	96.95
Invalid votes		5,333	1.32	8,428	2.07
Blank votes		1,671	0.41	3,986	0.98
Total votes		404,321	100.00	406,616	100.00
Registered voters/turnout		561,273	72.04	561,273	72.45
Source: Central Electoral Service, Central Electoral Service

== Statistics ==
#	President	Date of birth	Age at inauguration (first term)	Time in office (total)	Age at retirement (last term)	Date of death	Longevity
1	Makarios III	13 August 1913	47 years, 3 days	16 years, 211 days	63 years, 355 days	3 August 1977	63 years, 355 days
2	Spyros Kyprianou	28 October 1932	44 years, 310 days	10 years, 178 days	55 years, 123 days	12 March 2002	69 years, 135 days
3	Georgios Vassiliou	20 May 1931	56 years, 284 days	5 years, 0 days	61 years, 284 days	13 January 2026	94 years, 238 days
4	Glafcos Clerides	24 April 1919	73 years, 310 days	10 years, 0 days	83 years, 310 days	15 November 2013	94 years, 205 days
5	Tassos Papadopoulos	7 January 1934	69 years, 52 days	5 years, 0 days	74 years, 52 days	12 December 2008	74 years, 340 days
6	Demetris Christofias	29 August 1946	61 years, 183 days	5 years, 0 days	66 years, 183 days	21 June 2019	72 years, 296 days
7	Nicos Anastasiades	27 September 1946	66 years, 154 days	10 years, 0 days	76 years, 154 days	Living	80 years, 47 days (Living)
8	Nikos Christodoulides	6 December 1973	49 years, 85 days	3 years, 258 days (Ongoing)	Incumbent	Living	52 years, 342 days (Living)

== See also ==
- List of colonial governors and administrators of British Cyprus
- Politics of Cyprus
- List of Cypriot governments
