= 2023 Cypriot presidential election =

- 5 February 2023 (first round); 12 February 2023 (second round)
- Opinion polls
- Turnout: 72.05% (first round) ▲0.17pp 72.45% (second round) ▼1.52pp
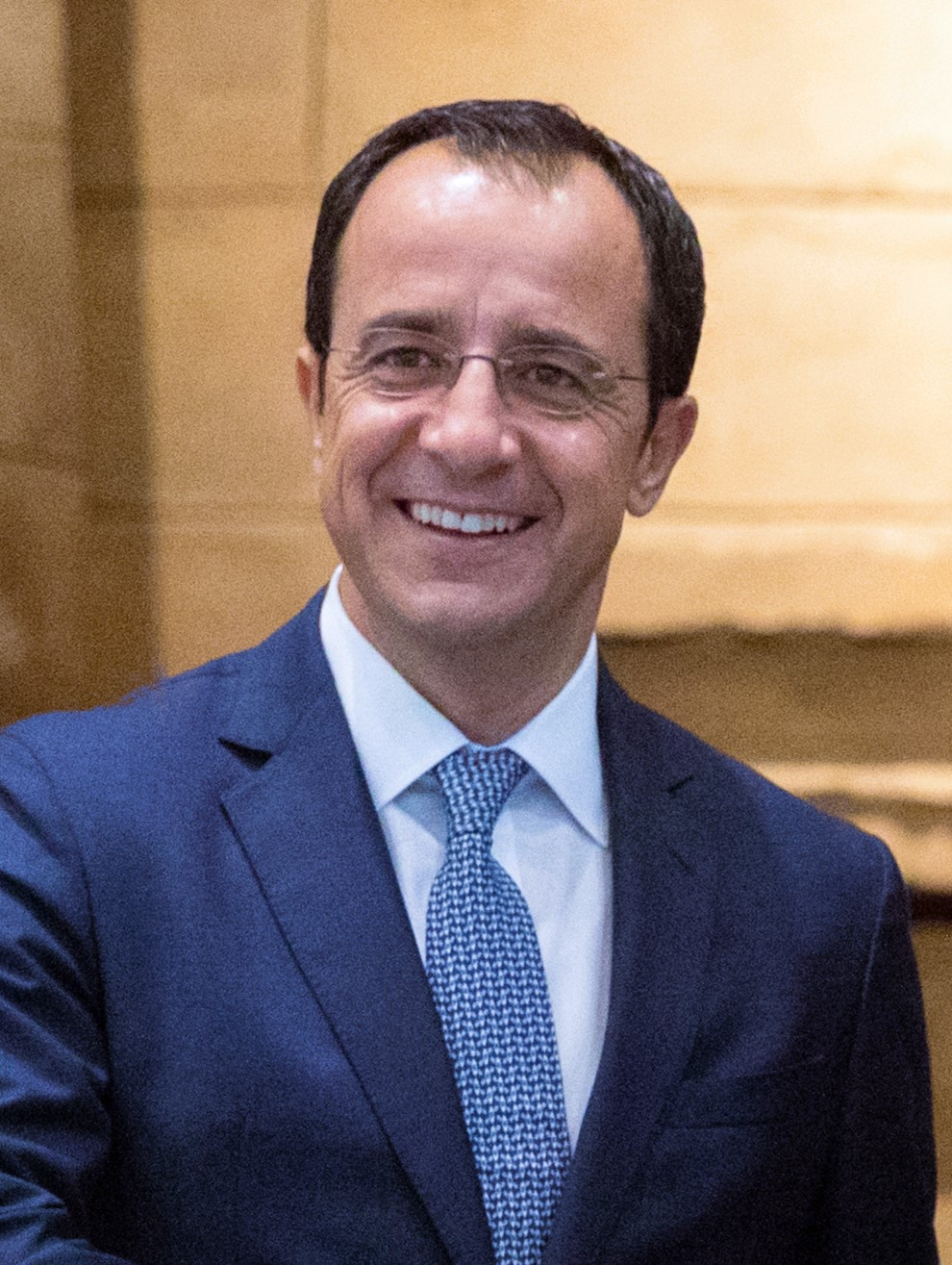

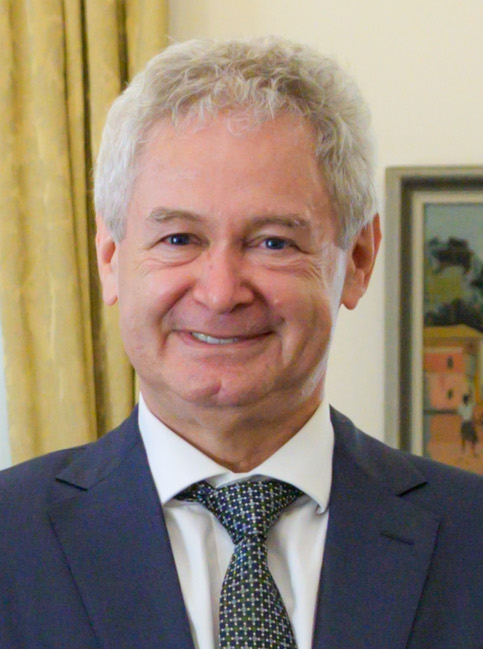
Candidate	Nikos Christodoulides	Andreas Mavroyiannis
Party	Independent (Note: Supported by DIKO, EDEK, DIPA, Solidarity, KEKK and APC.)	Independent (Note: Supported by AKEL and Generation Change.)
Popular vote	204,867	189,335
Percentage	51.97%	48.03%
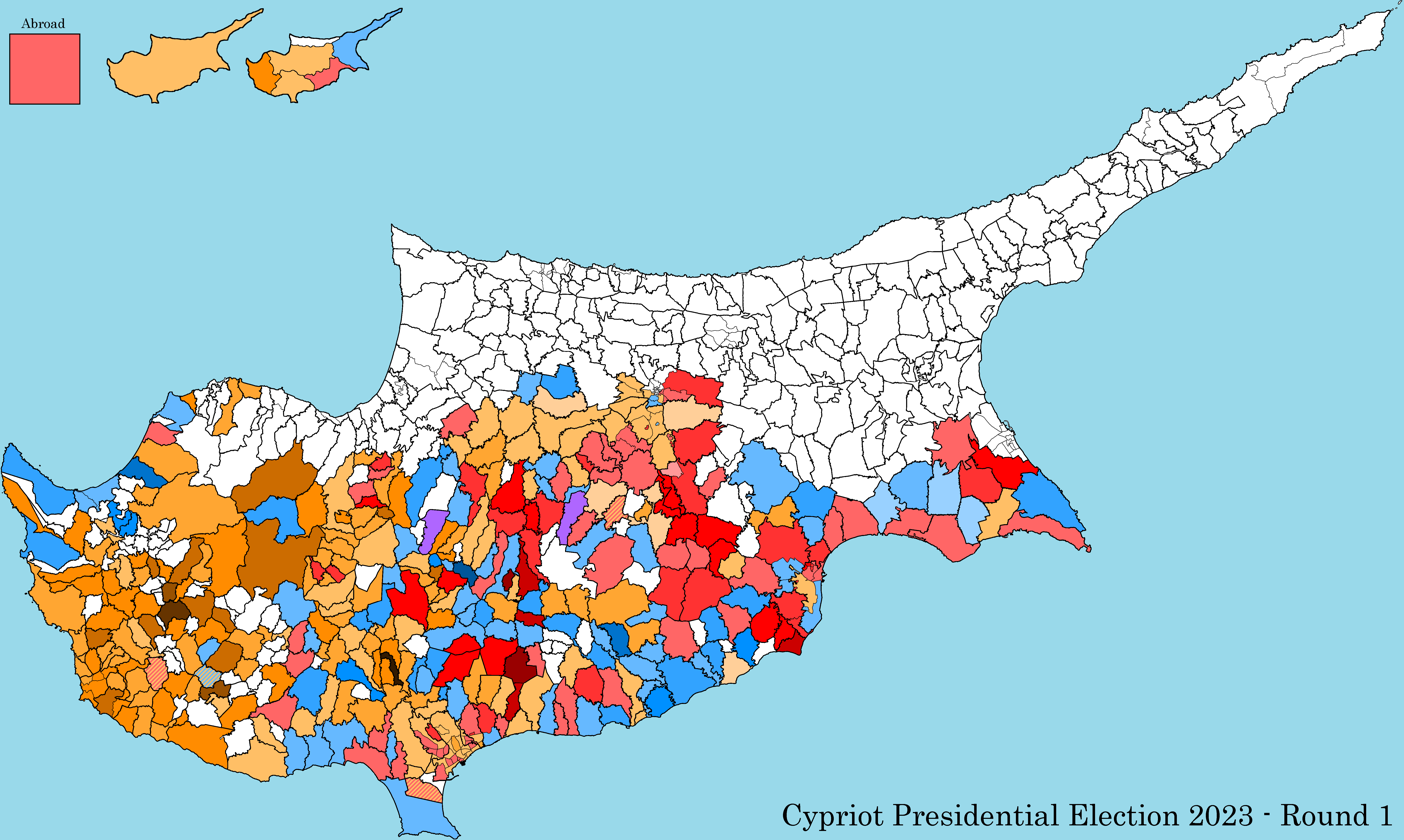
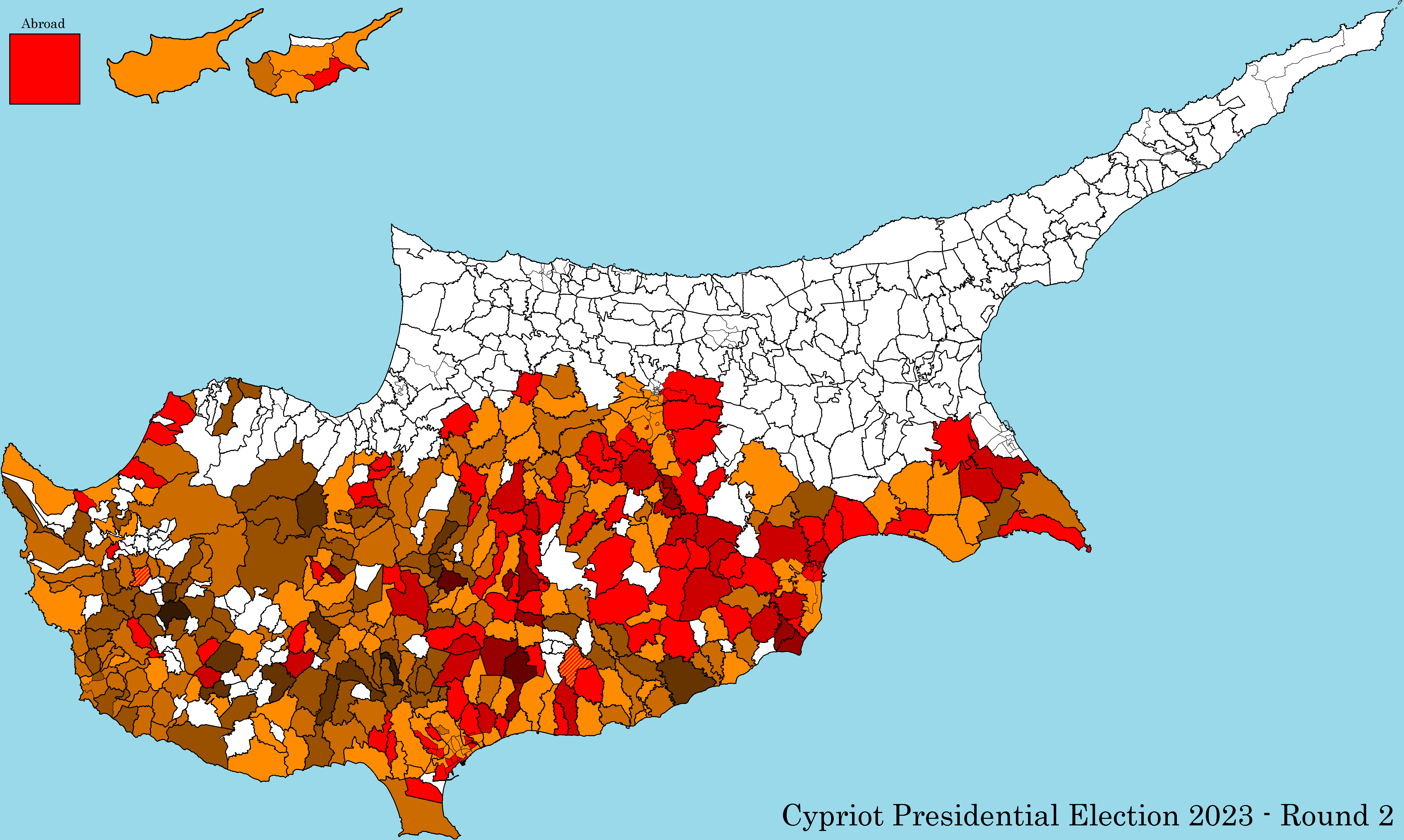
- Christodoulides: 20-30% 30-40% 40-50% 50-60% 60–70% 70–80% 80-90% 90-100% Mavroyiannis: 20-30% 30-40% 40-50% 50-60% 60–70% 70–80% Neofytou: 20-30% 30-40% 40-50% 50-60% 60–70% 70–80% Christou: 30-40% Christodoulides: 50-60% 60–70% 70–80% 80-90% 90-100% Mavroyiannis: 50-60% 60–70% 70–80% 80-90%
President before election
Nicos Anastasiades
Democratic Rally
Elected President
Nikos Christodoulides
Independent

Presidential elections were held in Cyprus on 5 February 2023. No candidate received a majority of the vote in the first round, so a runoff was held on 12 February. Incumbent president Nicos Anastasiades of the Democratic Rally (DISY), who won the presidential elections in 2013 and 2018, was ineligible to run due to the two-term limit mandated by the Constitution of Cyprus.

In the first round, independent candidate Nikos Christodoulides, supported by the Democratic Party (DIKO), Movement for Social Democracy (EDEK), Democratic Alignment (DIPA) and Solidarity, received 32.04% of the vote, coming first. Independent candidate Andreas Mavroyiannis, supported by the left-wing Progressive Party of Working People (AKEL), came second with 29.59% of the vote. Averof Neofytou, the president of the centre-right Democratic Rally (DISY), received 26.11% of the votes, finishing third in the first round.

Christodoulides and Mavroyiannis advanced to the second round. The incumbent president Anastasiades then endorsed Christodoulides, while DISY declined to endorse either of the remaining candidates. Christodoulides won the second round with 51.97% of the vote to Mavroyiannis' 48.03%. The margin of victory of less than 4% made this the closest presidential election in Cyprus since 1998.

== Electoral system ==
The President of Cyprus is elected using the two-round system; if no candidate receives over 50% of the vote in the first round, a second round is held between the top two candidates.

== Candidates ==
=== Supported by parliamentary parties ===
Candidates supported by parliamentary parties
Andreas Mavroyiannis	Averof Neofytou	Christos Christou	Nikos Christodoulides
Independent	Democratic Rally	National People's Front	Independent
Key facts
Ambassador, former negotiator of the Greek Cypriot community in the Cyprus talks, Permanent Representative of Cyprus to the UN, Permanent Representative of Cyprus to the EU and Deputy Minister for European Affairs (2012).	Former Minister of Communications and Works (1999–2003) and Mayor of Polis (1992-1996), MP and President of DISY (2013-2023).	MP (since 2016) and President of ELAM (since 2008).	Former Minister of Foreign Affairs (2018–2022), former Government Spokesman (2013–2018), former member of DISY running as an independent candidate.
Supported by:
1. AKEL; 2. Generation Change	DISY	ELAM	1. DIKO; 2. EDEK; 3. DIPA; 4. Solidarity Movement; 5. Active Citizens - Movement of Cypriot United Hunters; 6. Animal Party Cyprus.

=== Other candidates ===
- Achilleas Dimitriades: Lawyer, plaintiff of the landmark case Loizidou v. Turkey, running as an independent candidate endorsed by the "Famagusta for Cyprus" party
- Alexios Savvides: Mathematician, independent candidate
- Andronicos Zervides: Founder and CEO of GPG Cyprus, independent candidate
- Celestina de Petro: Former member of ELAM running as an independent candidate
- Charalampos Aristotelous: member of EDON, the youth wing of AKEL but running as an independent candidate
- Constantinos Christofides: Ex Rector of the University of Cyprus, member of the steering committee of New Wave, supported by New Wave
- George Colocassides: Former Deputy Chairman of DIKO now running as an independent candidate, lawyer
- Andreas Efstratiou: Bridal shop owner and candidate for president in 2003, 2008, 2013 and 2018, independent candidate
- Ioulia Khovrina Komninou: President of the United Republican Party of Cyprus, supported by the United Republican Party of Cyprus
- Loukas Stavrou: President of the "National Communitarian Reconstruction" party, supported by the "National Communitarian Reconstruction" party

=== Withdrawn ===
- Christodoulos Protopapas: CEO of Hellas Sat, independent candidate
- Constantinos Panayi: Former member of DIKO, former member of the Pancyprian Organization for the Rehabilitation of Disabled People, independent candidate
- Marios Eliades: Former Minister of Communications and Works (1978–1980), lawyer, independent candidate
- Andreas Nikolaou: Professor of physical medicine, independent candidate
- Louis Koutroukides: Activist of human rights for domestic workers in Cyprus, independent candidate

== Campaign ==
=== Averof Neofytou ===
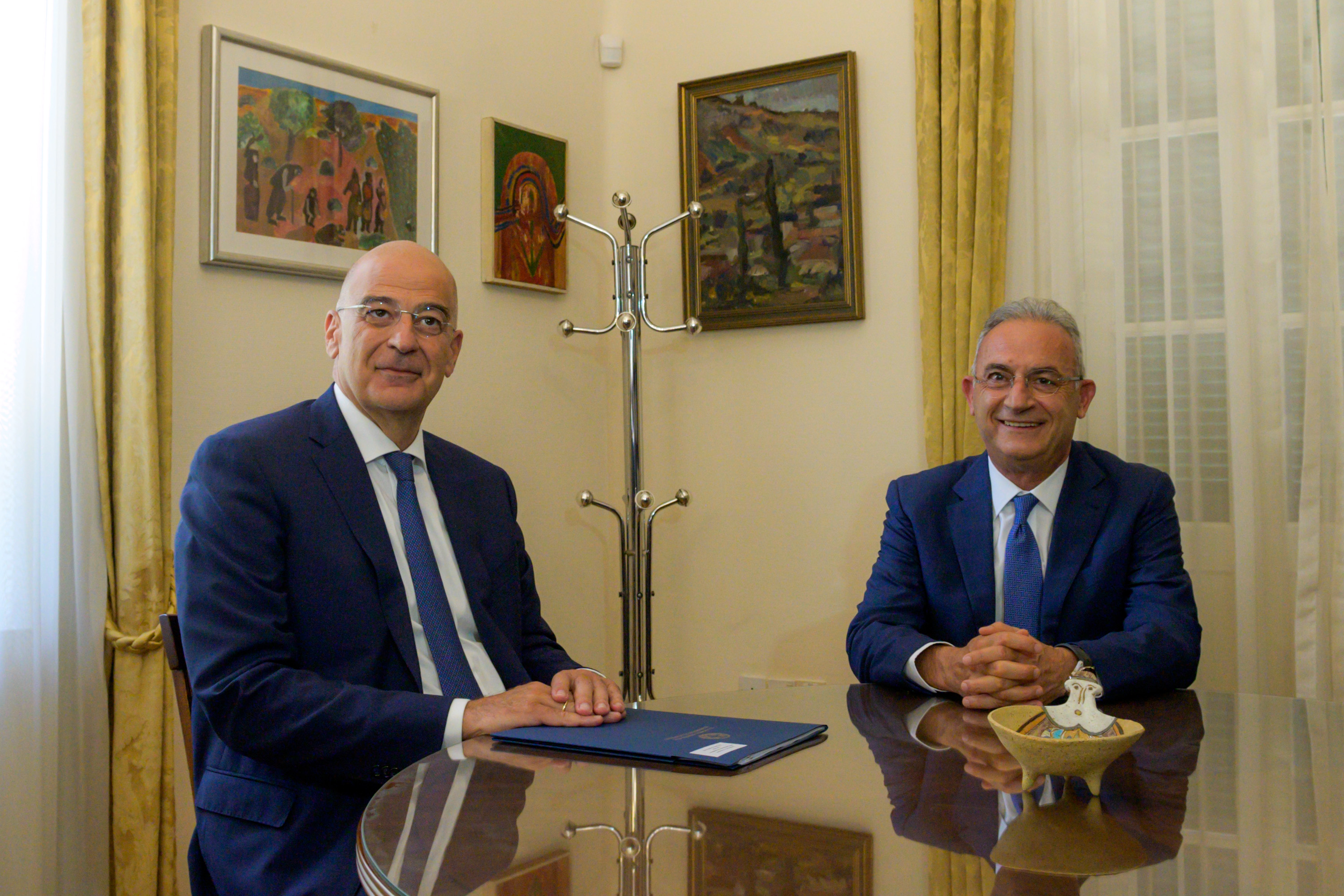
Former Greek Minister for Foreign Affairs Nikos Dendias meets with Averof Neofytou during his presidential campaign.

Averof Neofytou announced his candidacy on 22 December 2021, 14 months prior to the presidential elections. As the president of DISY, he was officially backed by the centre-right party. He was widely viewed as the successor of the outgoing president Nicos Anastasiades, since he is the president of the ruling party and has had an active role in the government since 2013.

Neofytou suggested many new policies and reformations, such as the application for NATO membership of Cyprus, a constitutional revision to increase transparency and decrease corruption, a radical reformation of the educational system, including the implementation of compulsory all-day schooling, focused mainly on culturing skills rather than covering material. He also promised to decrease government debt to 30% of GDP by 2028, a 1:1 ratio of women and men in the committee of ministers, converting Cyprus into a regional centre of technology, education and health, the equipment of all houses with solar panels to produce 125% of their energy demand, selling the excess electricity to make profit, increasing the defence budget to 2% of GDP and making Cyprus the "tech island of East Mediterranean".

Neofytou announced tax reform, that he described as "the most important and radical social reform that has ever taken place in the country". The idea was that the taxation of each family needed to be calculated considering the number of children and the total family income, rather than individual incomes. According to the candidate, this would immediately benefit 126,000 families to cover their everyday needs. In some extreme cases, families could see a decrease in annual taxation of up to €30,000. The plan was heavily criticised by the other candidates and was characterised as extemporaneous. Andreas Mavroyiannis publicly said that Averof was "transformed into Liz Truss" and that his plan mainly benefited the rich. Neofytou strongly denied the accusations, by insisting that unlike Truss, his tax reform would benefit the ones in need, not the millionaires. Nicos Christodoulides and Andreas Mavrohiannis disagree with Averof Neofytou on the application for NATO membership, because they both believe that Turkey will veto the application of Cyprus. Neofytou acknowledged this, but he presented the initiative as a strategic move to send a clear message to the international community that Cyprus belongs to the west, but also to improve the relationships of Cyprus with the USA. Averof Neofytou was supported by the president of Cyprus Nicos Anastasiades and the President of the House of Representatives Annita Demetriou.

=== Andreas Mavroyiannis ===
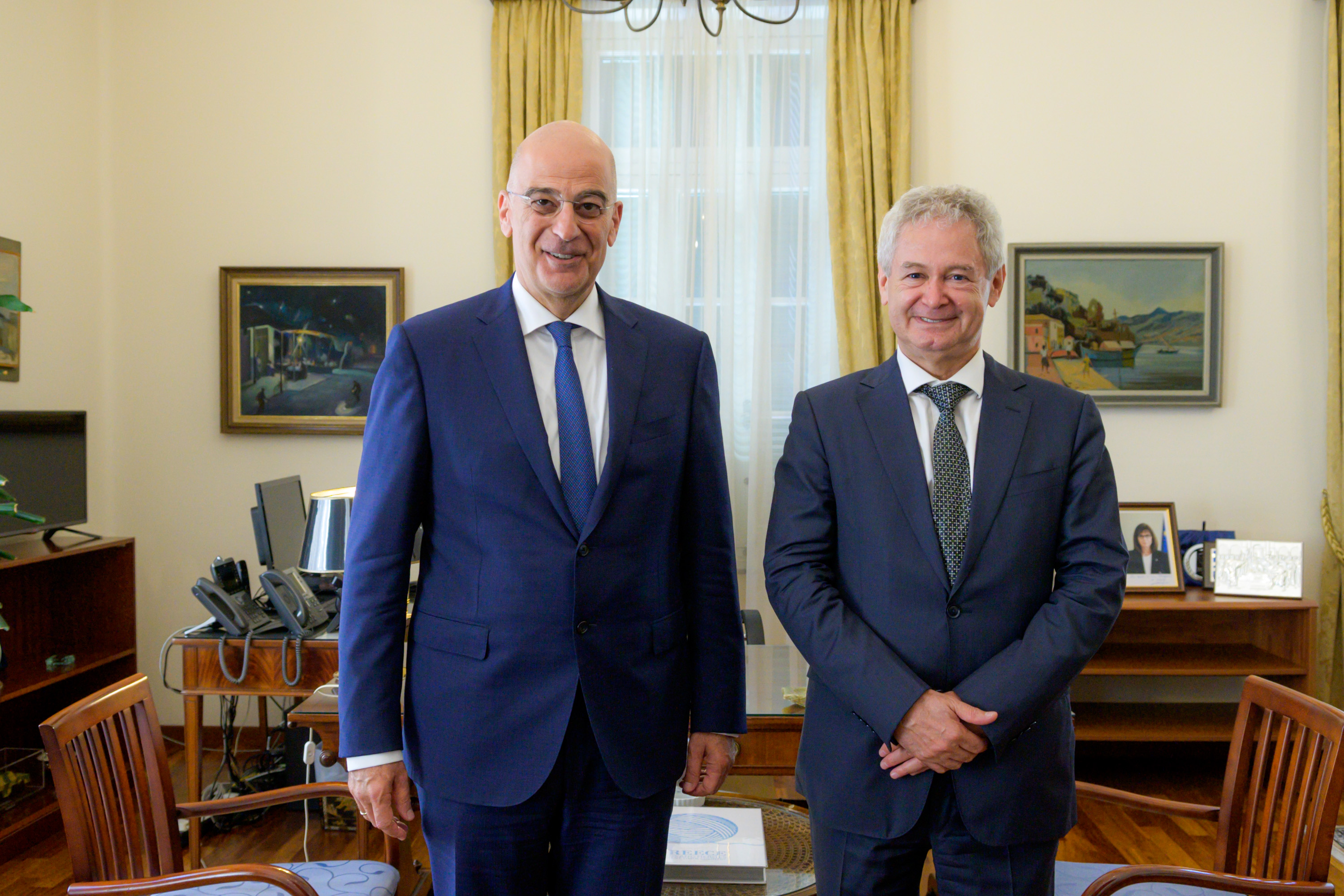
Former Greek Minister for Foreign Affairs Nikos Dendias meets with Andreas Mavroyiannis during his presidential campaign.

Andreas Mavoryiannis was appointed negotiator for the Greek Cypriot side in the talks on the Cyprus problem, by the president of Cyprus Nicos Anastasiades, on 1 September 2013. Mavroyiannis announced his resignation on 15 April 2022, due to the absence of progress in negotiations for the Cypriot problem. Despite being a close collaborator of the outgoing president as the official negotiator of Greek Cypriots, he became an independent candidate for the presidential elections, promising a progressive change of the governance of Cyprus.

Mavroyiannis was supported by the main opposition party, the communist party AKEL. AKEL decided not to run in the elections with a party candidate, but to support an independent politician. An internal election was carried out between Mavroyiannis and the lawyer Achilleas Demetriades, the president of the Human Rights Committee of the Cyprus Bar Association. Mavroyiannis won the election with 52 votes (53%). Demetriades gained 37 votes (38%) and 9 people preferred not to vote for either candidate (9%). He was also supported by the centre-left party Generation Change.

The presidential campaign of the candidate focused on the change in governance, for a green and fair state, with equal opportunities for everyone. His program included the abolition of double taxation on fuel, decreasing VAT of electricity from 19% to 9%, implementing compulsory all day schooling, equipment of all houses with solar panels on the basis of a graduated subsidy, which will reach up to 100%, increasing taxation on excess profit of energy companies and 100% return of ATA, based on the variation in inflation and its extension for all workers, with no exceptions. He also criticised the minimum wage of €940 per month, that was implemented by Nicos Anastasiades, promising to increase it and include everyone, by abolishing all the exceptions, like the exception for house maids. He also criticised the 12% penalty imposed to anyone that decides to retire at the age of 63, instead of 65. He promised to abolish the penalty, allowing everyone to choose to retire earlier, with no punishment.

Averof Neofytou denied the independency of Mavroyiannis, insisting that he is "totally dependent by AKEL", the main opposition party that Neofytou and DISY blame for the 2012–2013 Cypriot financial crisis. Mavroyannis denied these claims and insisted that he is an independent candidate, proud to be supported by a significant progressive political force.

=== Nikos Christodoulides ===
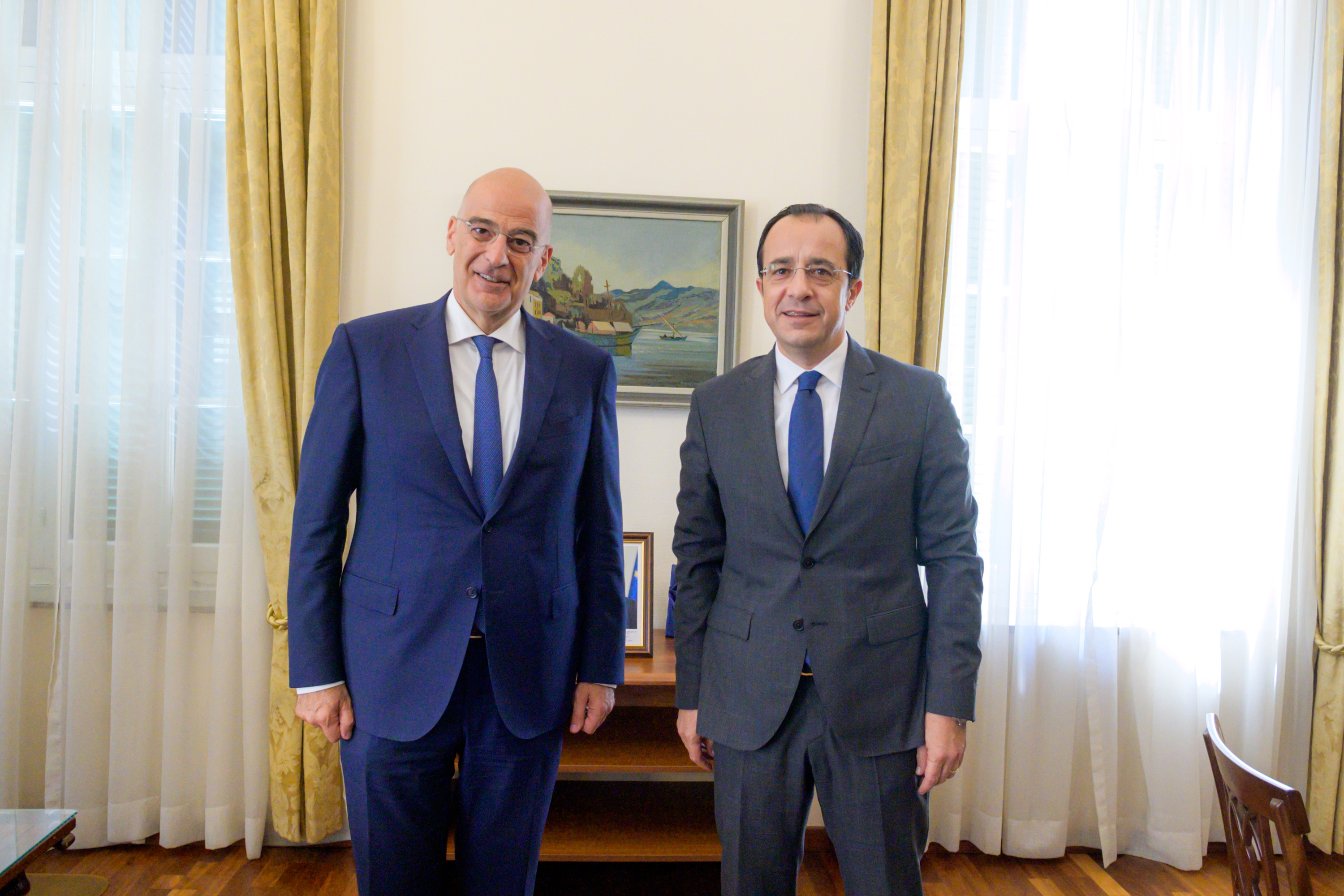
Former Greek Minister for Foreign Affairs Nikos Dendias meets with Nikos Christodoulides during his presidential campaign.

Nikos Christodoulides is an academic and career diplomat, who served as Spokesman of the Government from 2014 to 2018 and Minister of Foreign Affairs from 2018 to 2022. Despite being a member of DISY and one of the closest collaborators of the outgoing president Nicos Anastasiades, he entered the presidential elections as an independent candidate, without the support of his party. Christodoulides used to be the absolute favourite to win the elections, with around 50% of the public willing to vote for him in May 2022 and an astonishing 30-point lead from any other candidate in the first round. Although his popularity decreased significantly with time, in the last polls he maintained a healthy 6-point-lead. The independent candidate was supported by the centrist parties DIKO and DIPA, the centre-left EDEK and the right-wing Solidarity Movement. Through his campaign he was reluctant to criticise the 10-year government of Nicos Anastasiades and was repeatedly saying that his plan was to maintain the successful policies and abolish or improve the ones that did not have the desired outcome. He described himself as a supporter of social liberalism. His goal is to achieve a national unity government, with ministers from all the political parties and without political opposition.

Averof Neofytou was clear that DISY would not take part in any form of government with Christodoulides, since, if they were to lose the elections, the only responsible action would be to respect people's will and enter a responsible political opposition . He also used to deny the independency of Christodoulides and constantly criticising him for being dependent by parties with completely opposing ideologies on vital issues such as the economy and the Cyprus problem. Christodoulides did not accept the accusations, saying that his candidacy is completely independent. He proved his independency by insisting that he had not offered or promised anything to any political party to win their support. This was confirmed by the president of DIKO, Nikolas Papadopoulos.

Christodoulides's goals include connecting the educational system with the economy, creating deputy ministries of immigration and of sports, giving financial help to vulnerable groups through modifications of ATA and the instalment of financial literacy programs. He also envisioned perfecting the digital and green economy, achieving a tax reform and a pension reform, upgrading the network of EAC to increase the use of renewable energy sources and electrical interconnection of Cyprus with Greece, Israel and Egypt. Moreover, he suggested that the government should cover 100% of costs to install solar panels for vulnerable families, and 50% to non-vulnerable ones. He also used to emphasise his plan to strengthen the relationship Cyprus with the EU, since according to the candidate, the EU is the only one who can help Cyprus to solve the Cyprus problem.

=== Second round endorsements ===
Following the results of the first round, Achilleas Demetriades and Constantinos Christofides openly announced their endorsement of Andreas Mavroyiannis. Christos Christou and George Colocassides refused to endorse either candidate. Meanwhile, the Democratic Rally (DISY), led by Averof Neofytou, publicly announced that they would not endorse any candidate. However, Neofytou expressed his opposition to Christodoulides, indirectly endorsing Mavroyiannis as his preferred candidate. On the other hand, the outgoing president and former president of DISY, Nicos Anastasiades, indirectly endorsed Christodoulides by cautioning his party members against the possibility of an AKEL-backed government.

Endorsements by candidates
Candidate	Endorsement
Averof Neofytou	Against Christodoulides
Christos Christou	No Endorsement
Achilleas Demetriades	Mavroyiannis
Constantinos Christofides	Mavroyiannis
Georgios Colocassides	No Endorsement

== Opinion polls ==
First round

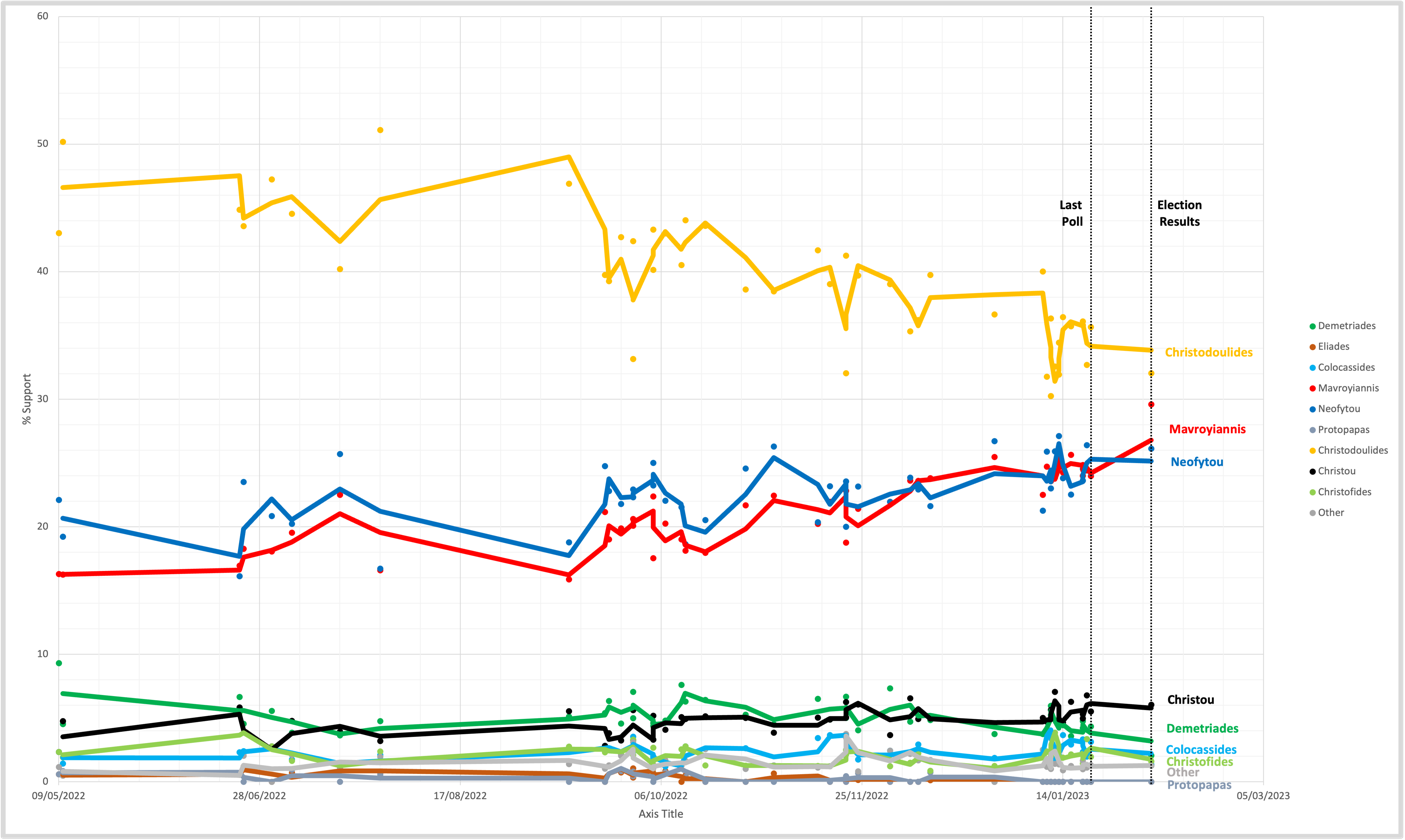

Second round

View source data.

== Results ==
Candidate	Party	First round		Second round	
Candidate	Party	Votes	%	Votes	%
Nikos Christodoulides	Independent	127,309	32.04	204,867	51.97
Andreas Mavroyiannis	Independent	117,551	29.59	189,335	48.03
Averof Neofytou	Democratic Rally	103,748	26.11		
Christos Christou	National Popular Front	23,988	6.04		
Achilleas Demetriades	Independent (Note: Supported by Famagusta for Cyprus)	8,137	2.05		
Constantinos Christofides	New Wave – The Other Cyprus	6,326	1.59		
Georgios Colocassides	Independent	5,287	1.33		
Alexios Savvides	Independent	2,395	0.60		
Charalampos Aristotelous	Independent	866	0.22		
Celestina de Petro	Independent	575	0.14		
Andronicos Zervides	Independent	341	0.09		
Ioulia Khovrina Komninou	United Republican Party of Cyprus	330	0.08		
Andreas Efstratiou	Independent	299	0.08		
Loukas Stavrou	National Communitarian Reconstruction	165	0.04		
Total		397,317	100.00	394,202	100.00
Valid votes		397,317	98.27	394,202	96.95
Invalid votes		5,333	1.32	8,428	2.07
Blank votes		1,671	0.41	3,986	0.98
Total votes		404,321	100.00	406,616	100.00
Registered voters/turnout		561,273	72.04	561,273	72.45
Source: Central Electoral Service, Central Electoral Service

=== Vote share by party support ===
Demographic	Christodoulides	Mavroyiannis	Neofytou	Christou	Demetriades	Christofides	Lead
DISY	30%	2%	60%	4%	1%	1%	30%
AKEL	8%	83%	3%	1%	1%	1%	75%
DIKO	72%	9%	10%	1%	1%	1%	62%
ELAM	16%	5%	15%	58%	0%	1%	42%
EDEK	65%	15%	3%	5%	2%	2%	50%
KOSP	26%	20%	10%	1%	22%	13%	4%
DIPA	42%	13%	27%	4%	6%	3%	15%
Other	39%	23%	14%	5%	7%	3%	16%
None	38%	23%	18%	7%	3%	2%	15%
Source: CYMAR

== Analysis ==
In the first round, independent candidate Nikos Christodoulides, supported by DIKO, EDEK, DIPA and Solidarity, secured 32.04%, coming first. Independent candidate Andreas Mavroyiannis, supported by the left-wing party AKEL, outperformed polls to gain 29.59% of the votes. Averof Neofytou, the president of the centre-right Democratic Rally, secured 26.11% of the votes, finishing third in the first round. Christodoulides was thereafter backed by the incumbent president Anastasiades, while DISY declined to endorse any of the remaining candidates. Christodoulides won the second round with 51.92% of the votes, against Mavroyiannis who received 48.08% of the votes, to become president of Cyprus. Mavroyiannis conceded and sent a congratulatory message to Christodoulides.
