= Minas Hadjimichael =

Cypriot diplomat (1956–2024)

His Excellency Minas Hadjimichael
- Μηνάς Χατζημιχαήλ

Permanent Representative of Cyprus to the United Nations
- In office 25 August 2008 – 9 April 2012
- Preceded by: Andreas Mavroyiannis
- Succeeded by: Nicholas Emiliou

Personal details
- Born: 1956 Famagusta
- Died: 5 October 2024 (aged 67)

Minas Hadjimichael (Greek: Μηνάς Χατζημιχαήλ; 1956 – 5 October 2024) was a Cypriot diplomat who was the Permanent Representative to the United Nations for Cyprus. He presented his credentials to UN Secretary-General Ban Ki-moon on 25 August 2008.

== Education ==
Hadjimichael held a bachelor of laws degree from the University of Athens and a master of arts in political science and international relations, which he received at Georgia Southern University in the United States. He also received instruction in European Union concerns from the Civil Service College of London, and was a participant in a programme hosted by the United States Information Agency (USIA) on the United States Federal Government System. In addition to his academic credentials, he spoke Greek, English and French.

== Career ==
Hadjimichael was Director of the Cyprus Question and European Union-Turkey Affairs Division of the Cyprus Ministry of Foreign Affairs, and served as the Ministry's Acting Permanent Secretary, prior to his taking office at the United Nations. His long diplomatic service included postings as Cyprus's Ambassador to France, Tunisia, Andorra, and Algeria. He served in Cyprus' European Union Division as deputy director. He served as Deputy Chief of Mission at the Cyprus Embassy in Athens, Greece and Director of the Cypriot Foreign Minister's Cabinet.

== Death ==
On 27 September 2024, Hadjimichael was involved in a car accident in Limassol. Nine days later, on 5 October, he died from his injuries, aged 67.

== See also ==
- List of current permanent representatives to the United Nations
