= United Republican Party of Cyprus =

United Republican Party of Cyprus Ενωμένο Ρεπουμπλικανικό Κόμμα Κύπρου
- President: Ioulia Khovrina Komninos
- Founded: 19 January 2021
- Headquarters: Cyprus
- Ideology: Euroscepticism; De-Euroization; United Cyprus
- House of Representatives: 0 / 56
- European Parliament: 0 / 6

Website
- ucrp.republican

The United Republican Party of Cyprus (Greek: Ενωμένο Ρεπουμπλικανικό Κόμμα Κύπρου) is a political party in Cyprus, established in January 2021. It is led by Ioulia Khovrina Komninos, who moved to Cyprus from the Soviet Union in 1994.

== Overview ==
The United Republican Party of Cyprus advocates for a united Cyprus without foreign troops or third-country interventions, full freedom of movement and settlement, and a bi-communal resolution of property issues. Economically, it proposes returning to the Cyprus pound to control fiscal policy, along with issuing government bonds to banking crisis victims. Socially, it supports extended paid maternity leave and lowering the retirement age for women to 60. Ecologically, it advocates for scalable green energy and stringent ecological controls. In health, it endorses personal choice in healthcare decisions and free special meals for newborns. Lastly, it priorities effective animal protection.

The party leader, Ioulia Khovrina Komninos, ran as a candidate in the 2023 Cypriot presidential election, securing 0.08% of the votes.

== Election results ==
=== Presidential elections ===
Year	Candidate	1st Round			2nd Round		
Year	Candidate	Votes	%	Result	Votes	%	Results
2023	Ioulia Khovrina Komninos	330	0.08	12th place	Didn't qualify		
