= Averof Neofytou =

Cypriot politician (born 1961)

Averof Neofitou
- Αβέρωφ Νεοφύτου
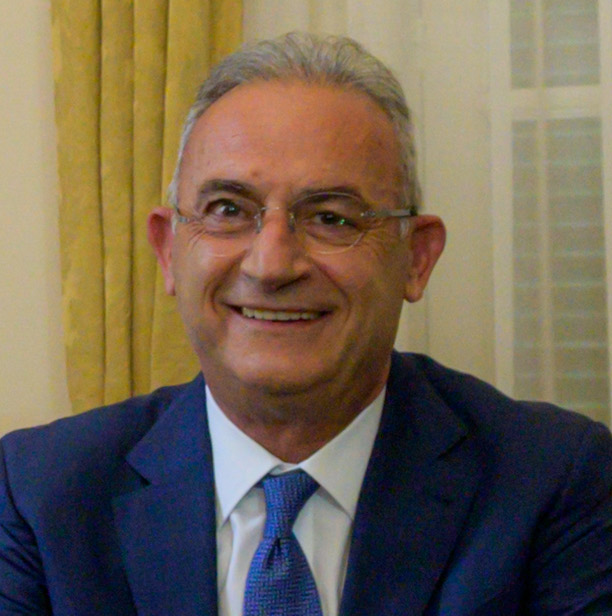
- Neofytou in 2022

President of the Democratic Rally
- In office 11 May 2013 – 11 March 2023
- Preceded by: Nicos Anastasiades
- Succeeded by: Annita Demetriou

Minister of Communications and Works
- In office 25 August 1999 – 28 February 2003
- President: Glafcos Clerides
- Preceded by: Leontios Ierodiakonou
- Succeeded by: Kikis Kazamias

Mayor of Polis
- In office 1 January 1992 – 5 June 1996
- Preceded by: Xrysostomos Kyriakou
- Succeeded by: Mixalis Korakas

Member of the Cypriot House of Representatives
- Incumbent
- Assumed office 1 June 2006 - 23 April 2026
- Constituency: Nicosia
- In office 6 June 1996 – 6 October 1999
- Constituency: Paphos

Personal details
- Born: 31 July 1961 (age 65) Argaka, Cyprus
- Party: Democratic Rally
- Spouse: Maria Selipa
- Children: 1
- Education: New York Institute of Technology
- Profession: Politician; Economist
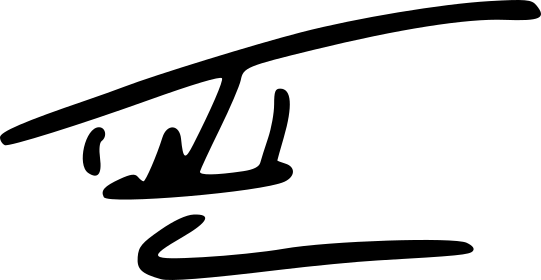
- Signature

Averof Neofytou (Greek: Αβέρωφ Νεοφύτου; born 31 July 1961) is a Cypriot politician, who was the President of the then-ruling Democratic Rally (DISY) party from 2013 to 2023, and currently serves as Member of the House of Representatives since 2006, having previously served in the position from 1996 to 1999. Prior to his election to parliament, which he briefly left to serve as Minister of Communications and Works, he was active in local politics and served as Mayor of his hometown, Polis, from 1992 to 1996.

On 20 March 2022, he was confirmed as DISY's candidate for the 2023 Cypriot presidential election. In the first round, on 5 February 2023, he secured 26.11% of the votes, finishing third, below Nikos Christodoulides (32.04%) and Andreas Mavroyiannis (29.59%). He stepped down from the party presidency shortly after the vote, and was succeeded by Annita Demetriou.

== Early life and education ==
Averof Neofytou was born in Argaka, Paphos, in a non-political family. He completed his secondary education in the public school of Polis Chrysochous in Paphos. He studied Economics and Accountancy at the New York Institute of Technology. Averof Neofytou worked in the private sector before he became the mayor of his hometown in Paphos at the age of 30.

== Political career ==
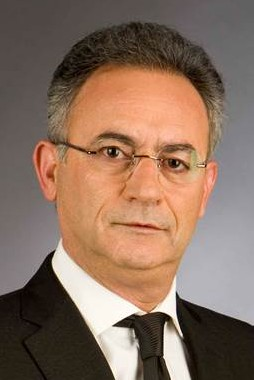
Averof Neofytou in 2014

Neofytou served as vice-president of the Youth of Democratic Rally (NEDISY). In 1991, at the age of 30, he was elected Mayor of Polis Chrysochou in the district of Paphos. In 1996, shortly before the end of his term as mayor, he was elected to the House of Representatives for the district of Paphos.

In 1999, Neofytou was appointed Minister of Transport and Works in the government of Glafcos Clerides, a position he held until 2003. In 2003, he was elected as the Deputy President of Democratic Rally. In the parliamentary elections of 2006, 2011 and 2016, Neofytou was re-elected as a member of the House of Representatives for the Nicosia District.

As a Member of Parliament, Neofytou has served as Chairman of the Parliamentary Committee on Finance and Budget, Chairman of the Parliamentary Committee on Foreign and European Affairs, leader of the delegation of the House to the Conference of the Presidents of the Foreign Affairs Committees of the European Union, leader of the delegation of the House to the Conference of European Affairs Committee of the Parliaments of the European Union, leader of the delegation of the House to the Inter-Parliamentary Union and as member of the Select Committee.

Neofytou is currently the leader of the delegation of the House to the Inter-Parliamentary Union and to the Parliamentary Assembly of the Union for the Mediterranean. He is also the leader of the delegation of the House to the Inter-Parliamentary Conference on Stability, Economic Coordination and Governance in the European Union. In May 2013, Averof Neofytou was elected President of DISY, succeeding President Nicos Anastasiades.

Neofytou has served as a member of the Union of Municipalities of Cyprus, Honorary Secretary of the Paphos Chamber of Commerce and Industry, a member of the Board of the Cyprus Football Association and President of the Cyprus Anti-Cancer Society in Polis Chrysochous.

== President of Democratic Rally (2013–2023) ==
Neofytou took over the leadership of the Democratic Rally in 2013, when Cyprus was hit by the financial crisis and had entered a financial agreement with Troika. The new DISY government was called to improve the economy and overcome the recession. Under Neofytou, DISY achieved the parliamentary support necessary to pass the reforms required by the economic adjustment program for Cyprus, even though the party lacked a Parliamentary majority in the House. Within three years after signing the memorandum of understanding, Cyprus exited the Troika financial assistance program, demonstrating stable growth and economic growth rates above the European Union average.

When announcing his withdrawal from the 2023 Presidential race, he also resigned as head of Disy, leaving that position to be filled by either Demetris Demetriou or Annita Demetriou. Annita Demetriou was elected Disy president in March 2023 with 68% of the vote.

== 2023 Presidential Elections ==
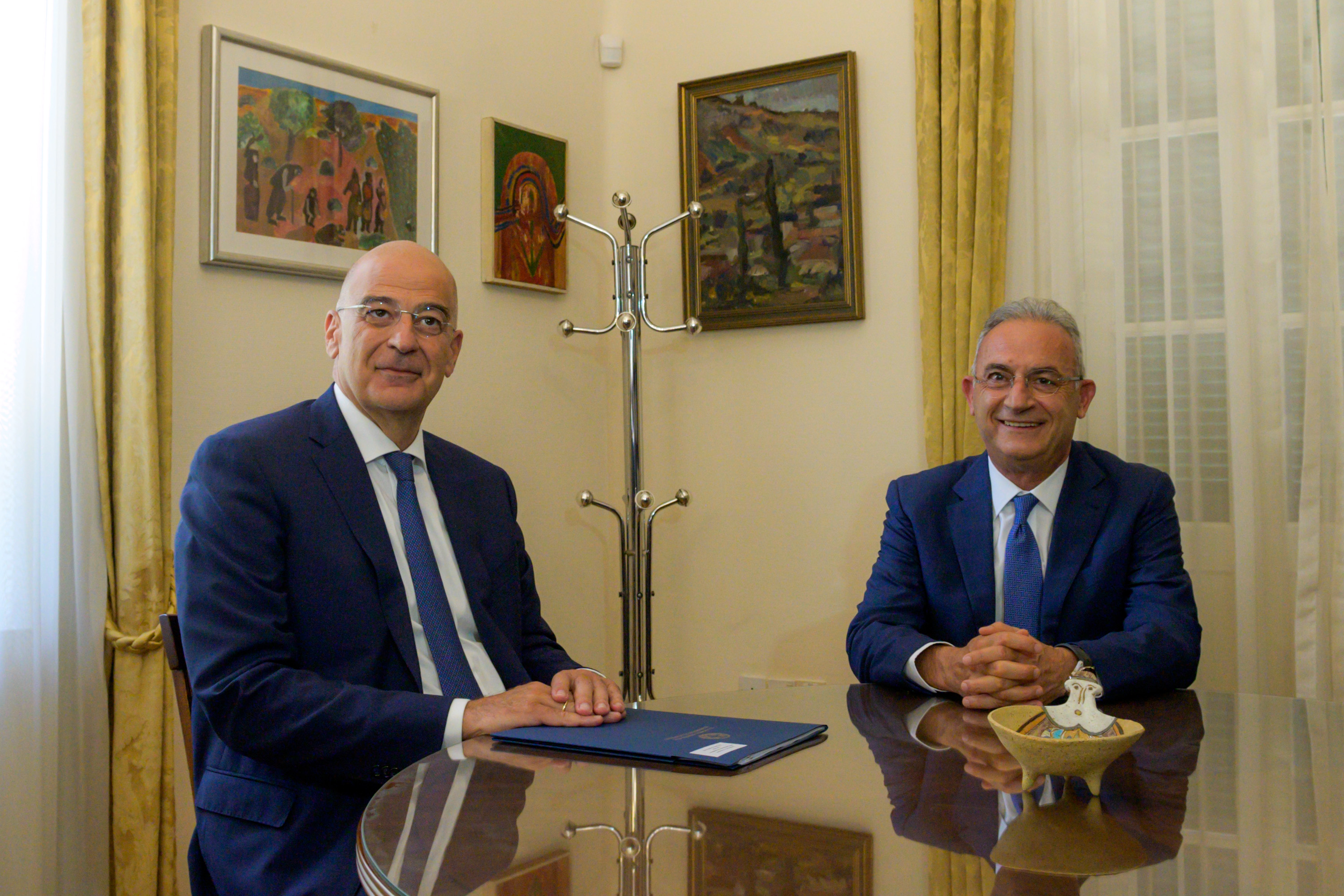
Former Greek Minister for Foreign Affairs Nikos Dendias meets with Averof Neofytou during his presidential campaign.

On 22 December 2021 Averof Neophytou announced that he would be a candidate in the presidential elections, in February 2023, as the official representative of DISY. In July 2022 he was already campaigning for president, while also still leader of Disy. His main opponent was Nikos Christodoulides. He was supported by the president of Cyprus Nicos Anastasiades and the President of the House of Representatives Annita Demetriou.

After securing 26.11% of the public votes in the first round, he came third and failed to qualify for the second round. The independent candidate Nikos Christodoulides, supported by DIKO, EDEK, DIPA and Solidarity Movement, received 32.04% of the votes, finishing first. Andreas Mavroyiannis, an independent candidate supported by the left wing party AKEL, secured the second place, after receiving 29.59%. It meant that Disy was out of the presidential run-off for the first time in history. Former Cypriot president Nicos Anastasiades in April 2023 gave a speech denying he'd sought to undermine Averof's presidential campaign, stating he'd sought to resolve the conflict with Christodoulides leaving Disy to run as an independent, and had afterwards backed Averof as Christodoulides' opponent. Neofytou filed his election campaign expenses in April 2023, revealing he'd spent €975,522 for his presidential election bid. Largest listed donors were the shipowner’s union, Treppides and CO, Fiduserve management, FX PRO Financial Services, Duat WB, and TCR International.

== Personal life ==
Averof Neofytou is married to Maria Selipa and has one son Pericles, named after his father. He is an ethnic Greek.

== Articles and speeches ==
- Address by the President of the Democratic Rally, Mr. Averof Neofytou to the EPP Group, Brussels, 9 October 2019
- Address by the President of the Democratic Rally, Mr. Averof Neofytou at the Conference in honor of Federal Defence Minister of Germany, Dr. Ursula Von der Leyen "European & Eastern Mediterranean Security. Geopolitical challenges and opportunities", Thursday, 5 March 2019
- Address by the President of the Democratic Rally, Mr. Averof Neofytou at the Conference in honor of Commissioner of Digital Economy and Society, Ms. Mariya Gabriel, Thursday, 31 January 2019
- Address by the President of the Democratic Rally, Mr. Averof Neofytou at the dinner in honor of Commission VP for Jobs, Growth, Investment and Competitiveness, Mr. Jyrki Katainen, Sunday, 27 January 2019
- Keynote Address by the President of the Democratic Rally, Mr. Averof Neofytou, at the Dinner in honor of Manfred Weber, Thursday, 10 January 2019
- Averof Neophytou, leader of Cyprus ruling party, presents a Digital vision for Cyprus 2030
- EU Membership comes with responsibilities, 29/09/2015
- Security concerns in the Middle East and North Africa Regions, Address LII COSAC, Riga, 31 May – 2 June 2015
- «Israel: the credible and once forgotten neighbor», 06/01/2016

Party political offices
Preceded by Nicos Anastasiades	Leader of the Democratic Rally; 2013–	Incumbent
Political offices
Preceded by Leontios Ierodiakonou	Minister of Communications and Works; 1999–2003	Succeeded by Kikis Kazamias
