= Andreas Efstratiou =

Andreas Efstratiou (Greek: Ανδρέας Ευστρατίου) is a Cypriot bridal shop owner and perennial candidate. He has been a candidate in every Cypriot presidential and parliamentary election since 2000 and every European election until 2019. In the 2003, 2008, 2013 and 2018 presidential elections he received 0.15, 0.16, 0.10 and 0.22% of the vote, respectively, and in the 2001, 2006, 2011 and 2016 parliamentary elections, he received 1.10, 1.40, 0.65 and 0.62% of the vote in Paphos Constituency, respectively. As a candidate for MEP, he received 0.13, 0.13 and 0.18% of the vote in the 2004, 2009 and 2014 European elections, respectively.
