= 2018 Cypriot presidential election =

- 28 January 2018 (first round); 4 February 2018 (second round)
- Turnout: 71.88% (first round); 73.97% (second round)
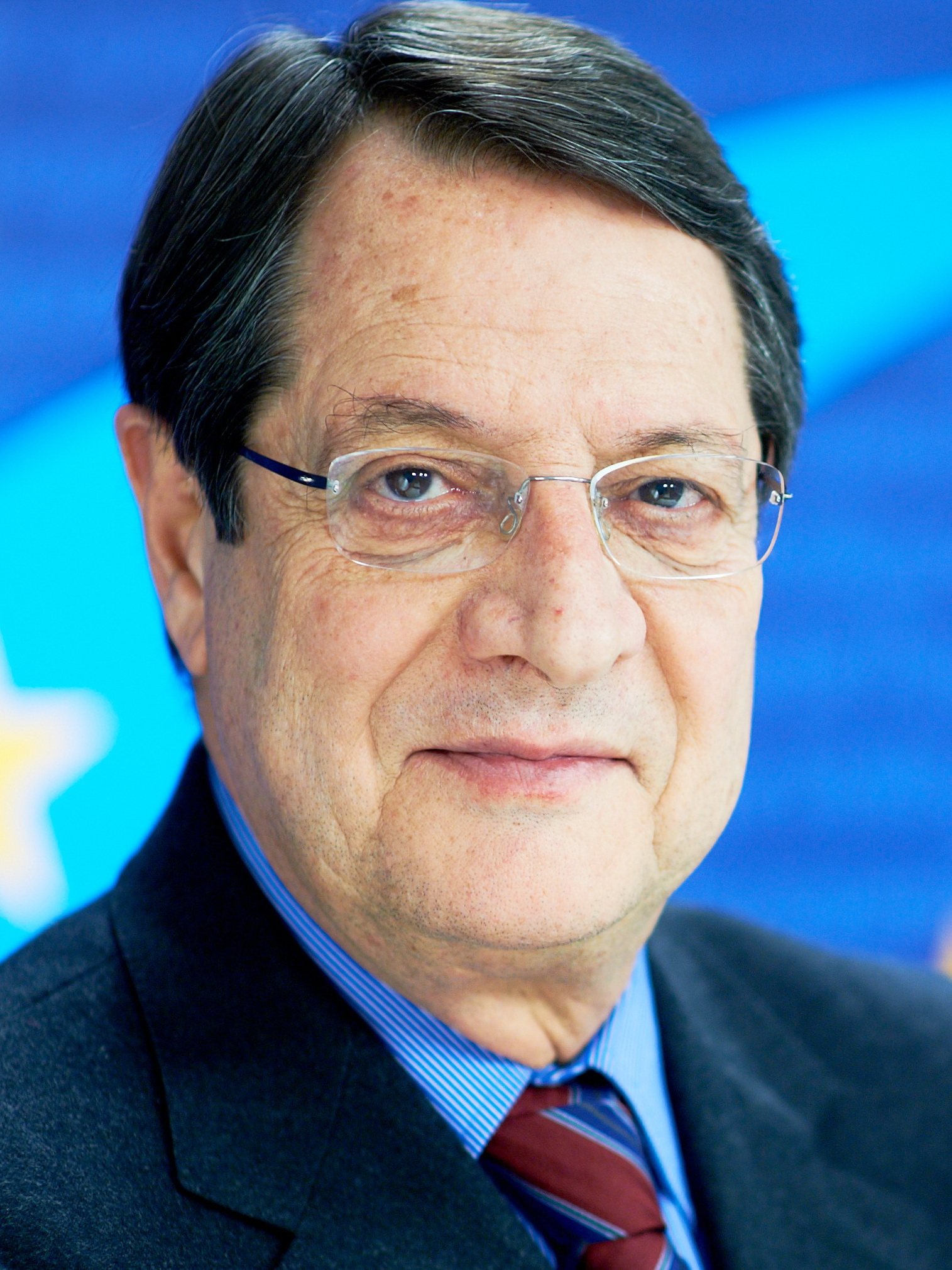

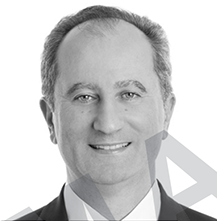
Nominee	Nicos Anastasiades	Stavros Malas
Party	DISY	AKEL (Note: Malas, although a member of AKEL, announced his campaign independently as a nonpartisan candidate instead of being put forward by the party. AKEL later decided to endorse him.)
Popular vote	215,281	169,243
Percentage	55.99%	44.01%
President before election
Nicos Anastasiades
DISY
Elected President
Nicos Anastasiades
DISY

Presidential elections were held in Cyprus on 28 January 2018. As no candidate received a majority of the vote in the first round, a run-off was held on 4 February between the top two candidates, incumbent President Nicos Anastasiades of the Democratic Rally (DISY) and Stavros Malas of the Progressive Party of Working People. Anastasiades emerged as the winner with 55.99% of the vote.

== Electoral system ==
The President of Cyprus is elected using the two-round system; if no candidate gets a majority in the first round of voting, a run-off is held between the top two candidates.

== Candidates ==
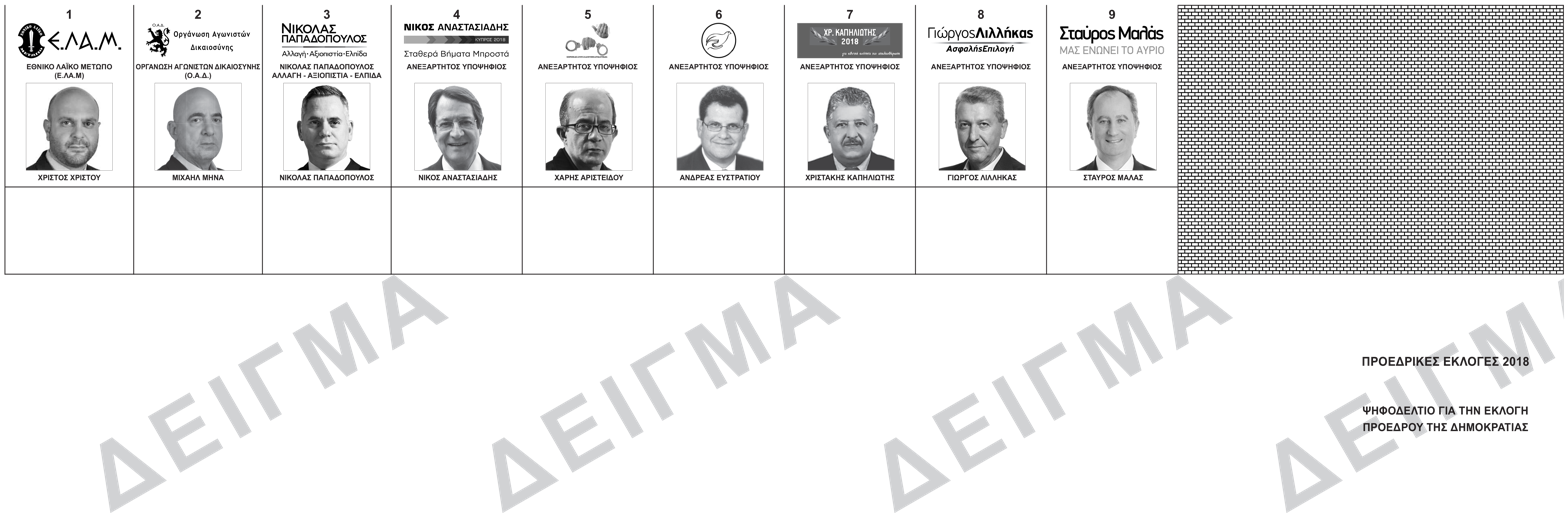
Sample of the ballot used in the first round

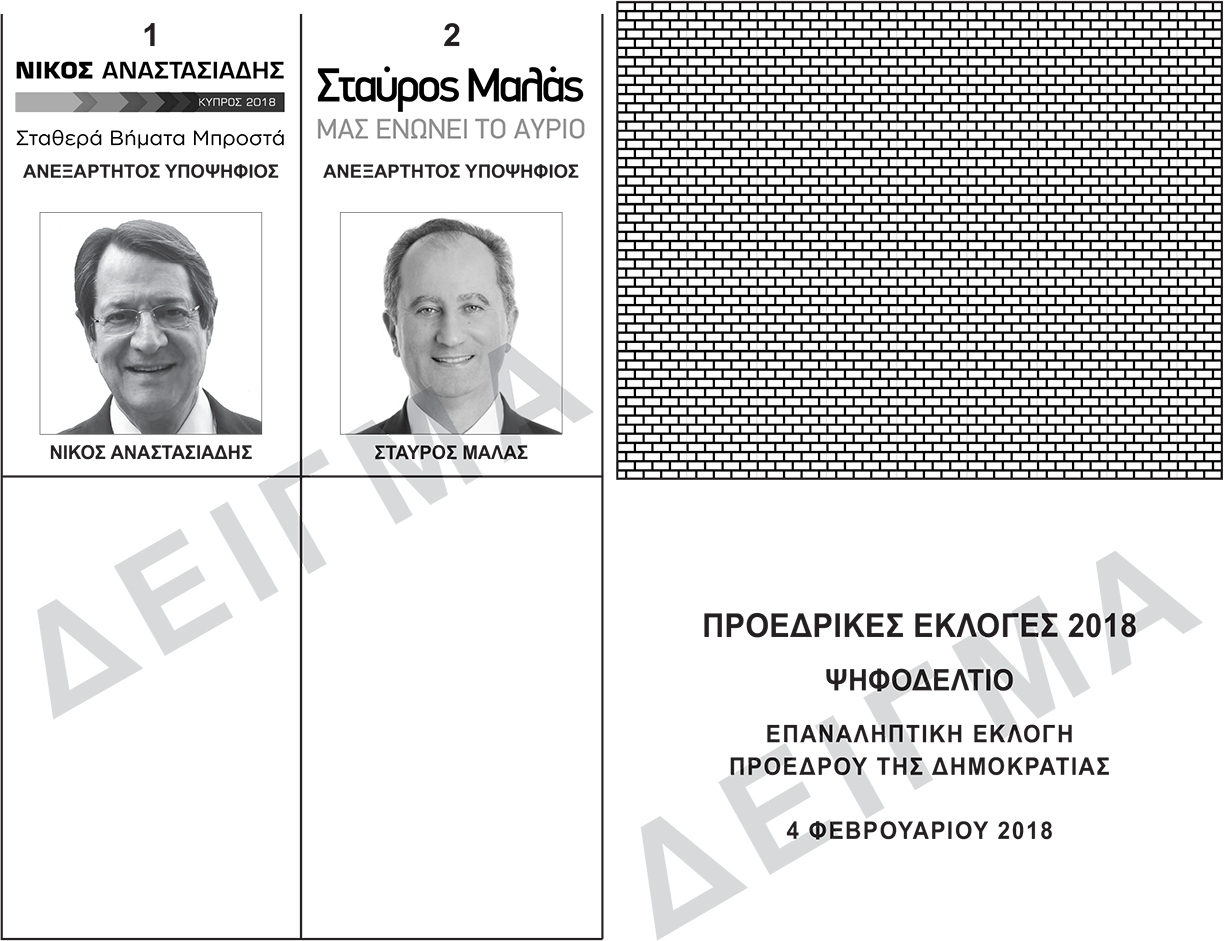
Sample of the ballot used in the second round

- Nicos Anastasiades, DISY
- Charis Aristeidou, Independent
- Christos Christou, ELAM (Cyprus)
- Andreas Efstratiou, Independent
- Christakis Kapiliotis, Independent
- Giorgos Lillikas, Citizens' Alliance
- Stavros Malas, Progressive Party of Working People
- Michail Mina, Organisation of Justice Fighters
- Nikolas Papadopoulos, Democratic Party also endorsed by the Solidarity Movement and the Movement for Social Democracy

== Opinion polls ==
=== First round ===
View chart definition.

Pollster	Date	Abstention						Other	Lead
Pollster	Date	Abstention	Anastasiades DISY	Malas AKEL	Papadopoulos DIKO	Lillikas SYPOL	Christou ΕLΑΜ	Other	Lead
Election results	29 Jan 2018	28.12%	35.51%	30.24%	25.74%	2.18%	5.65%	0.68%	5.27%
CMRC	19 Jan 2018	16.5%	30.2%	20%	21.4%	2.4%	3.6%	5.9%	8.8%
Prime Consulting	18 Jan 2018	16.9%	31.9%	20.8%	23.4%	2.6%	2.8%	1.6%	8.5%
CYMAR	18 Jan 2018	36%	27%	16%	14%	2%	4.5%	0.5%	11%
Symmetron	18 Jan 2018	11.8%	34.2%	23.1%	22.6%	3.1%	4.3%	0.9%	11.1%
Symmetron	14 Jan 2018	12.5%	34.4%	21.2%	22.6%	3.5%	4.3%	1.5%	11.8%
Noverna	14 Jan 2018	22.6%	32.1%	18.6%	14.5%	1.2%	5.7%	5.3%	13.5%
Pulse	12 Jan 2018	2.2%	30.8%	18.5%	18.9%	3.8%	3.8%	1%	11.9%
CYMAR	21 Dec 2017	33.5%	30%	15%	15%	2%	4%	0.5%	15%
Prime Consulting	15 Dec 2017	10.1%	35%	21.8%	25.3%	3.3%	3.1%	1.4%	9.7%
Noverna	10 Dec 2017	25.7%	30.4%	17.8%	13.8%	2.1%	3.3%	6.9%	12.6%
CMRC	8 Dec 2017	16.2%	29.1%	18.7%	21.1%	4.1%	3.7%	7%	8%
CYMAR	24 Νov 2017	28.5%	27%	13.5%	13.5%	2%	4%	11.5%	13.5%
Symmetron	23 Νοv 2017	9.6%	33.7%	19.6%	22.6%	4.1%	2.7%	0.7%	11.1%
CMRC	10 Νοv 2017	19%	26.3%	17%	19.7%	4%	3.6%	10.5%	6.6%
Prime Consulting	7 Νοv 2017	15%	32.9%	17.7%	24%	4.1%	1.7%	4.6%	8.6%
Prime Consulting	15 Οct 2017	16%	30%	16%	21%	4%	-	13%	9%
IMR	12 Οct 2017	31%	33%	18%	20%	6%	-	2%	13%
Prime Consulting	9 Οct 2017	18%	31.7%	17%	23.1%	5.1%	-	5.1%	8.6%
Noverna	8 Oct 2017	17%	23%	17%	17%	7%	3%	17%	6%
Symmetron	2 Οct 2017	25%	32%	16%	22%	5%	-	-	10%
CYMAR	29 Sep 2017	33%	27%	13%	16%	3%	-	8%	11%
CYMAR	29 Sept 2017	33%	27%	12%	14%	2%	-	13%	13%
IMR	29 Jul 2017	22%	31%	21%	19%	7%	-	-	10%

== Results ==
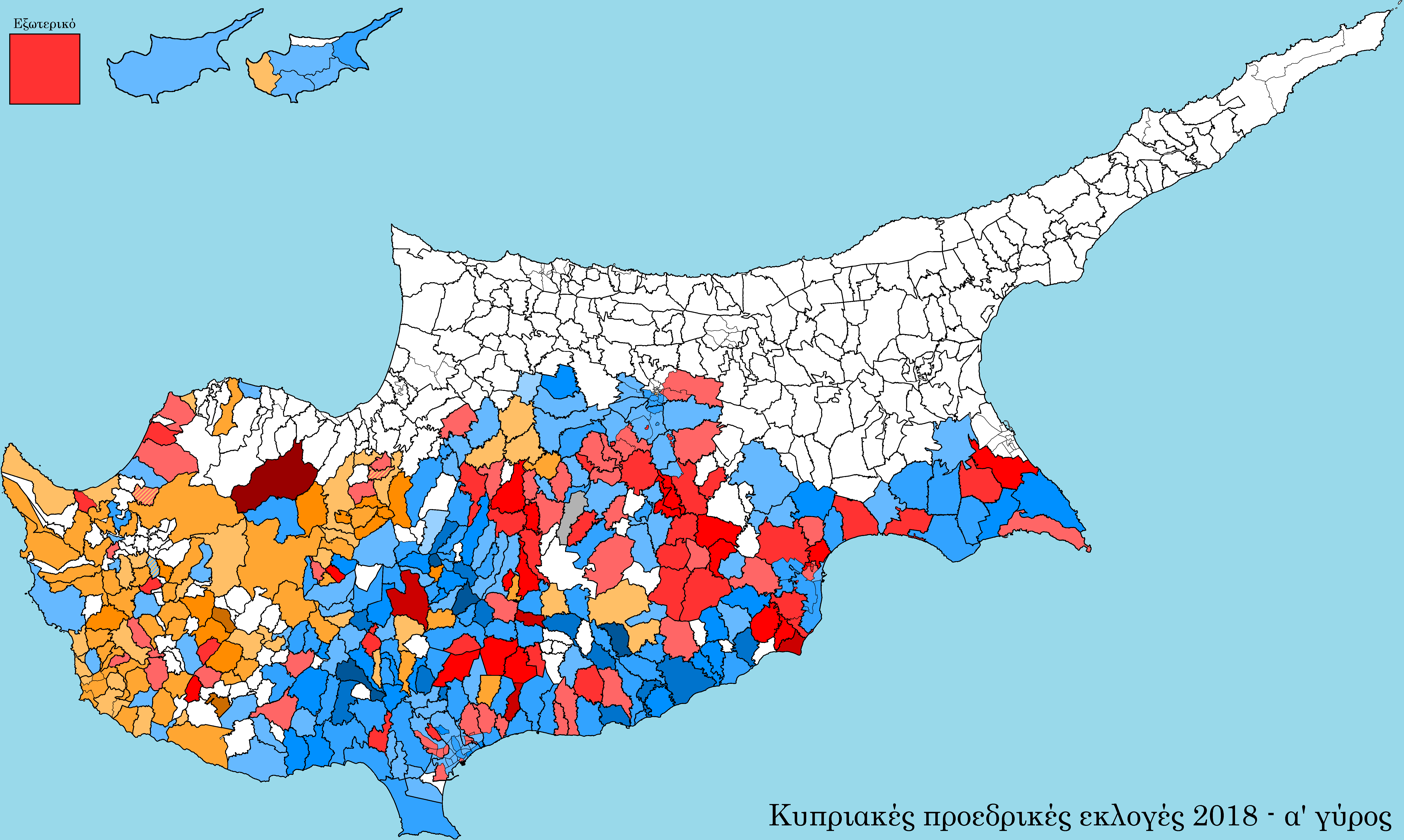
A map of the first round's results.

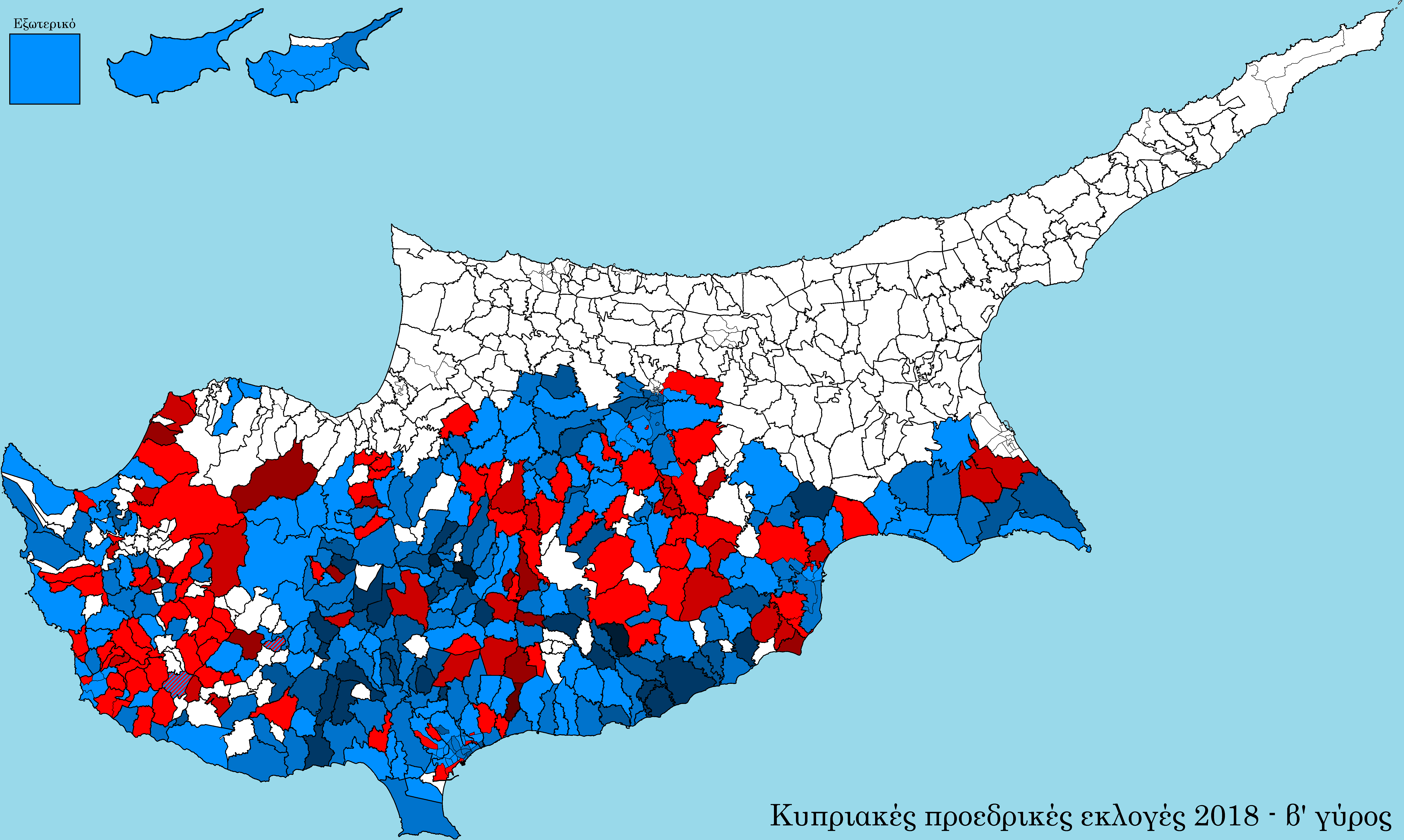
A map of the second round's results.

Candidate	Party	First round		Second round	
Candidate	Party	Votes	%	Votes	%
Nicos Anastasiades	Democratic Rally	137,268	35.51	215,281	55.99
Stavros Malas	Progressive Party of Working People	116,920	30.24	169,243	44.01
Nikolas Papadopoulos	Democratic Party	99,508	25.74		
Christos Christou	ELAM	21,846	5.65		
Giorgos Lillikas	Citizens' Alliance	8,419	2.18		
Andreas Efstratiou	Independent	845	0.22		
Charis Aristeidou	Independent	752	0.19		
Michail Mina	Organisation of Justice Fighters	662	0.17		
Christakis Kapiliotis	Independent	391	0.10		
Total		386,611	100.00	384,524	100.00
Valid votes		386,611	97.64	384,524	94.37
Invalid/blank votes		9,338	2.36	22,951	5.63
Total votes		395,949	100.00	407,475	100.00
Registered voters/turnout		550,876	71.88	550,876	73.97
Source: European Polling Report, Central Electoral Service

=== By district ===
==== First round ====
District
District	Anastasiades DISY		Malas AKEL		Papadopoulos DIKO		Christou ELAM		Lillikas SYPOL		Others		Turnout	
District	Votes	%	Votes	%	Votes	%	Votes	%	Votes	%	Votes	%	Total	%
Nicosia	51,224	34.11	44,989	29.95	40,994	27.29	8,438	5.62	3,616	2.41	933	0.62	153,874	72.23
Famagusta	9,652	43.58	6,311	28.49	3,545	16.00	2,096	9.46	434	1.96	112	0.51	22,850	72.57
Larnaca	24,088	36.74	23,961	36.55	12,590	19.20	3,555	5.42	1,078	1.64	285	0.44	67,161	72.38
Limassol	39,951	38.19	29,711	28.40	27,021	25.83	4,879	4.66	2,127	2.03	935	0.87	107,062	70.38
Paphos	9,777	27.17	8,640	24.01	13,667	37.98	2,518	7.00	1,029	2.86	349	0.96	36,713	73.77
Cypriots abroad	2,576	31.78	3,308	40.81	1,691	20.86	360	4.44	135	1.67	36	0.45	8,239	70.95
Total	137,268	35.51	116,920	30.24	99,508	25.74	21,846	5.65	8,419	2.18	2,650	0.68	395,949	71.88

==== Second round ====
Districts
Districts	Anastasiades DISY		Malas AKEL		Turnout	
Districts	Votes	%	Votes	%	Total	%
Nicosia	82,721	56.17	64,555	43.83	156,788	73.60
Famagusta	14,591	62.84	8,628	37.16	24,448	77.65
Larnaca	35,866	52.73	32,146	47.27	71,280	76.81
Limassol	61,086	57.79	44,623	42.21	111,707	73.44
Paphos	17,034	52.37	15,492	47.63	35,067	70.47
Cypriots abroad	3,983	51.18	3,799	48.82	8,185	70.06
Total	215,281	55.99	169,243	44.01	407,475	73.97
