= Christos Christou (politician) =

Cypriot politician (born 1980)

- Χρίστος Χρίστου
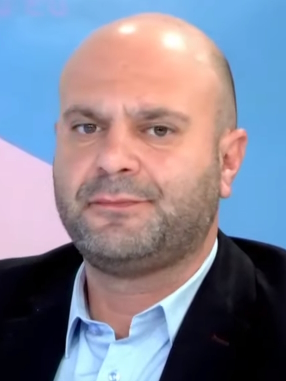
- Christou in 2023

President of ELAM
- Incumbent
- Assumed office 2008
- Preceded by: Party established

Member of the House of Representatives
- Incumbent
- Assumed office 2 June 2016
- Constituency: Nicosia

Personal details
- Born: 19 October 1980 (age 45) Politiko, Nicosia District, Cyprus
- Party: ELAM (2008–present)
- Other political affiliations: Golden Dawn (Until 2010)
- Spouse: Evdokia Leontiou
- Children: 1
- Education: Technological Educational Institute of Athens

Christos Christou (Greek: Χρίστος Χρίστου; born 19 October 1980) is a Greek Cypriot politician, who is the President of the ELAM party since 2008, and serves as a member of the House of Representatives since 2016.

Christou was his party's candidate in the 2023 presidential election.

== Early life and education ==
Christos Christou was born in Politiko on 19 October 1980. His main language is Greek, but he also speaks English. He obtained a degree in radiology at the Technological Educational Institute of Athens. He has also worked at the Nicosia General Hospital and is currently a member of the Pancyprian Association of Technologists-Radiologists and Radiotherapists.

== Political career ==
During his studies in Greece, he was a member of the far-right Golden Dawn political party, and is one of the founders of the National Popular Front. After the first congress of the party, he became its chairman. He was elected MP in the 2016 parliamentary elections for the first time in the Nicosia Constituency with ELAM for the 11th parliamentary term. Christou also had close ties to Golden Dawn's now imprisoned chief, Nikos Michaloliakos.

As an MP, he is the representative of ELAM in the Parliament of the Republic of Cyprus, deputy chairman of the Parliamentary Committee on Health, member of the Parliamentary Committee on Foreign and European Affairs and the Parliamentary Committee on Institutions, Values and Administration, and member of the Parliamentary Delegation to the Conference of the European Affairs Committees of the Parliaments of the Member States of the European Union.

In the 2018 presidential elections, he was a presidential candidate with 5.65% of the vote.

He was re-elected in 2021 for the 12th parliamentary term.

=== 2023 presidential elections ===
During the 2023 Cypriot presidential election, Christou again sought the office of president. He outlined his platform as such:

- Reducing illegal immigration, which he claimed was the cause of the cost of living increase and housing crisis in the country.
- A price ceiling on essential good and a reduction in Value-added tax for the elderly and young.
- Combating corruption with the creation of a special court for financial crimes.
- Increasing support for the disabled with subtitles and sign language on national TV.
- Supporting local artisans and domestic industry.
- Increasing financing and visibility of public hospitals.
- Having the President consult with the Church of Cyprus on important issues.
- Opposition to the legalization of cannabis.

Christou was one of four candidates to participate in the Presidential debates, allowing him to have his campaign messages reach a broader audience. Christou received 6.04% of the vote and did not qualify for the runoff election.
