= New Wave – The Other Cyprus =

New Wave – The Other Cyprus Νέο Κύμα – Η Άλλη Κύπρος
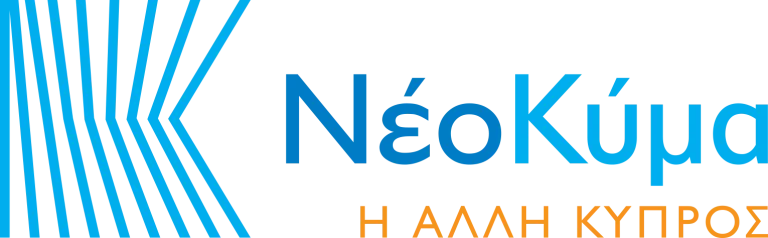
- General Secretary: Constantinos Christofides
- Founded: 18 November 2019
- Dissolved: 3 December 2023
- Merged into: Volt Cyprus
- Youth wing: Youth Group
- Ideology: Progressivism; Pro-Europeanism

Website
- neokyma.org.cy

New Wave – The Other Cyprus (Greek: Νέο Κύμα – Η Άλλη Κύπρος, romanized: Néo Kýma – I Álli Kýpros) was a political movement in the Republic of Cyprus. The movement's main stated goal was to mobilize society for reform and new prospects for Cyprus and the young people of the country. It merged into Volt Cyprus in december 2023.

== History ==
Neo Kyma was founded on November 18, 2019, by Constantinos Christofides, former rector of the University of Cyprus, as a movement against corruption and the ongoing political stagnation of the country during the division of Cyprus. The name New Wave is inspired by the same-named music movement in Greece, film movement in France, and cultural movement in the United Kingdom and the United States during the 1960s, which coincided with the independence of Cyprus. On November 18, 2019, the movement and its supporters officially introduced itself at an event in Nicosia. In the process, it was initially registered as a non-profit corporation.

In May 2021, the Neo Kyma movement announced that it would not participate in the 2021 parliamentary elections, contrary to its initial plans. It justified this with its not yet fully developed program and the aggravated conditions caused by the COVID-19 pandemic. On 4 November 2021, Neo Kyma and Volt Europa, a European political alliance, signed a Memorandum of Understanding for a merger and agreed to cooperate closely, in which the Cypriot team renamed itself "Neo Kyma || Volt Cyprus - The Other Cyprus". Together, they intend to run in the 2023 presidential elections and merge into the Volt Cyprus political party after the election, which will then form the local branch of Volt in Cyprus.

On 29 April 2022, the Neo Kyma movement announced that it would contest the 2023 presidential elections with Christofides as its candidate. Christofides received 1.6% of the vote in the first round.

On 26 October 2023, the Neo Kyma movement announced that it would join forces with Famagusta for Cyprus to form the Volt Cyprus party. At its founding party conference on 3 December 2023, the party adopted its statutes and elected Alexandra Attalides and Charilaos Velaris as its chairpersons. This formalised the merger.

== Structure ==
The highest body of the movement was the 77-member Council, whose task was to make proposals and decisions on how the movement can influence things in Cyprus. It consisted of 77 members of the movement elected every 3 years and meets at least quarterly to review the work done by committees.

The Coordination Committee was the executive body of the Movement and consists of a maximum of 14 members elected by the 77-member Council. It implements the decisions of the council and is responsible for the smooth functioning and development of the movement, as well as partnerships with other movements.

The movement's programmatic development took place in 15 Thematic Committees, and the committees take on an advisory role, reporting regularly to the Coordinating Committee. These worked together to develop a program for participating in elections and taking positions toward the work of the government.

The movement also had a youth group that works especially for a sustainable future with work for all, with equal education and development opportunities, and concerns for young people.

Locally, the movement was structured in 7 district teams, corresponding to the 6 districts of Cyprus and Troodos.

== Policies ==
=== Cyprus conflict ===
In the Cyprus conflict, New Wave supports the reunification of Cyprus as a federal state, supports the basic direction of the UN's plans, and calls for more efforts from all parties to further refine the plans. In doing so, it sees itself as an all-Cypriot movement of Greek Cypriots and Turkish Cypriots, and condemns the Turkish government's continued occupation of the northern part of Cyprus.

=== EU reform ===
The movement supports the idea of a federal united Europe with a Senate representing the interests of the regions and a European government, with a prime minister elected by the European Parliament. To this end, a common European constitution should be adopted, with human rights, freedom, democracy and equality at its core. Europe is to share a common foreign policy and European army, in addition to a common market and economy.

=== Administrative reform ===
The movement calls for a reform of local government, aiming to reduce the number of municipalities in Cyprus to 6. In this way, the recommendations of the EU are to be implemented and the costs of maintaining the large number of local authorities, each with its own personnel, equipment and buildings, are to be significantly reduced. At the same time, this should also reduce bureaucracy and allow for lower taxes. Public administration and state structures should also be modernised and decisions made more transparent by supporting e-government.

=== COVID Pandemic ===
The movement proposes to provide government assistance to artists, cultural workers, laborers, and entrepreneurs who are active in all areas of culture and who have suffered particularly from loss of income due to restrictive measures during the COVID Pandemic.

=== Taxes ===
The movement criticizes lowering electricity prices by reducing the value-added tax from 19% to 9%, since this equal reduction benefits wealthy segments of the population in particular, while particularly affected segments of the population are hardly relieved. The movement therefore proposes staggered taxation to target poorer segments of the population and curb fossil fuels.

=== Environmental and health protection ===
The movement calls for the introduction of modern safety standards and thorough inspection and assessment of existing industrial plants in Cyprus to ensure the protection of the health of residents in the surrounding area and the environment. To this end, it proposes the modernisation and expansion of pollution monitoring stations in their vicinity and calls for strict restrictions on plants and their owners who do not comply.

== Electoral results ==
=== President of Cyprus ===
Election	Round 1			Candidate	Win
Election	#	%	Rank	Candidate	Win
2023	6,326	1.59	6th	Constantinos Christofides	No
