= Andreas Mavroyiannis =

Cypriot politician and diplomat

- Ανδρέας Μαυρογιάννης
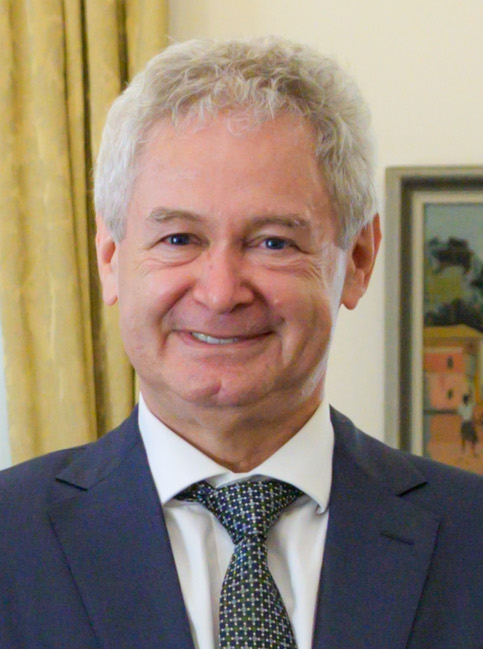
- Andreas Mavroyiannis in 2022

Permanent Representative of Cyprus to the United Nations
- In office 23 July 2019 – 17 February 2021
- Preceded by: Kornelios Korneliou
- Succeeded by: Andreas Hadjichrysanthou
- In office 7 August 2003 – 25 August 2008
- Succeeded by: Minas Hadjimichael

Deputy Minister for European Affairs
- In office 17 October 2011 – 31 January 2013
- President: Demetris Christofias

Permanent Representative of Cyprus to the European Union
- In office August 2008 – October 2011
- Succeeded by: Kornelios Korneliou

Ambassador of Cyprus to France
- In office 1999–2002

Ambassador of Cyprus to Ireland
- In office 1997–1999

Personal details
- Born: 20 July 1956 (age 70) Agros, British Cyprus
- Spouse(s): Calliope Efthyvoulou (died 2014) Lena Shamoun (m. 2021)
- Children: 2
- Education: Aristotle University of Thessaloniki; Paris-Panthéon-Assas University; Paris Nanterre University
- Awards: Officer, National Order of the Legion of Honour; National Order of Diplomatic Merit of Romania

Andreas D. Mavroyiannis (Modern Greek: Ανδρέας Δ. Μαυρογιάννης; born 20 July 1956) is a Cypriot diplomat and politician who served as Cyprus' Ambassador and Representative to the United Nations, European Union, France, and Ireland. He was an unsuccessful candidate in the 2023 presidential election. He served as Deputy Minister of European Affairs (2011 -2013) and as negotiator for the Cyprus problem (2013-2022). He is currently the Chairmain of the International Law Commission of the United Nations.

== Early life and education ==
Andreas Mavroyiannis was born in Agros, British Cyprus, on 20 July 1956. He graduated from The Hague Academy of International Law, the Aristotle University of Thessaloniki with a diploma in law, the Paris Pantheon University of Law and Economics with two master's degrees in political sciences and international law, and from Paris Nanterre University with a Doctor of Philosophy in political sociology.

== Career ==
Mavroyiannis joined the Ministry of Foreign Affairs' diplomatic service in 1987. Mavroyiannis was Cyprus' ambassador to the United Nations from 2003 to 2008, and 2019 to 2021. He was one of the vice presidents of the 62nd session of the United Nations General Assembly. He also served as Cyprus' ambassador to the European Union from 2008 to 2011, Ireland, and France.

During the Cyprus peace process Mavroyiannis served as chief negotiator under President Nicos Anastasiades from 2012 to 2022. He was the Deputy Minister for European Affairs from 2011 to 2013, and Permanent Secretary of the Ministry of Foreign Affairs in 2013.

Mavroyiannis ran in the 2023 presidential election as an independent candidate. Nikos Christodoulides defeated him in the second round of voting.

In 2023, Mavroyiannis was appointed to a five-year term on the International Law Commission. He is an adjunct professor at Frederick University.

== Personal life ==
The Officer of the Legion of Honour of France and National Order of Diplomatic Merit of Romania were given to Mavroyiannis. He can speak English, French, and Greek. He married Calliope Efthyvoulou, with whom he had two children before her death.

== Political positions ==
Mavroyiannis proposed using Cyprus' offshore natural gas deposits with Turkish Cypriots as a way to ease the peace process.

== Works cited ==
=== News ===
- "Καλωσόρισε τη στήριξη της Άννας Θεολόγου ο Μαυρογιάννης". Kathimerini. 23 June 2022. Archived from the original on 30 June 2025.
- Kambas, Michele (12 February 2023). "Cyprus politician Christodoulides wins presidential vote". Reuters.
- Hadjicostis, Menelaos (5 February 2023). "Ex-foreign minister will face diplomat for Cyprus presidency". Associated Press. Archived from the original on 30 June 2025.
- Smith, Helena (5 February 2023). "Cyprus presidential election goes to runoff with ex-foreign minister in lead". The Guardian. Archived from the original on 30 June 2025.

=== Web ===
- "Amb. Andreas Mavroyiannis". Concordia Summit.
- "Ambassador Andreas Mavroyiannis" (PDF). Centre for International Law. Archived (PDF) from the original on 30 June 2025.
- "Dr. Andreas Mavroyiannis". Frederick University. Archived from the original on 30 June 2025.
