= Dominica Award of Honour =

Highest ranking honour of Dominica

- Awarded for: Meritorious service
- Presented by: Dominica
- Post-nominals: DAH
- Ribband of the award

Precedence
- Next (higher): None
- Next (lower): Sisserou Award of Honour

The Dominica Award of Honour is a decoration of the Commonwealth of Dominica. Created in 1967, it is the highest honour presented by the President of the Commonwealth of Dominica on behalf of the state.

== Insignia ==
The badge of the Dominica Award of Honour is an oval-shaped golden coloured medallion. The outer ring of the medallion bears the inscription in relief THE DOMINICA AWARD OF HONOUR. The center of the medallion is depicts the Coat of arms of Dominica. The area around the coat of arms and the outer ring is cut out.

The badge is suspended from a ring attached at the top, and hangs from a yellow ribbon with a center stripe of black bordered on its outside by white.

== Notable recipients ==
- Nicholas Liverpool
- Monsieur Jaques Le Connec, Esq. (1975)
- Private Raphail Registe, Esq. (1975)
- Inspector Percival "Skerret" James, Esq. (1975)
- Edward Oliver Le Blanc, Esq. (1976)
- Irvine Theodore Shillingford, Esq. (1976)
- Phillip Nassief, Esq. (1977)
- Cecil A. Burton, Esq. (1977)
- R. E. Henry, Esq. (1977)
- Miss Norma Garrard (1977)
- Mrs. Alexia Le Blanc (1977)
- Sir Louis Cools-Lartigue O.B.E., Esq. (1978)
- Hon. Patrick John J.B., O.F.de M., Esq. (1978)
- Hon. L. I. Austin O.B.E., Q.C., Esq. (1978)
- Dr. Phillip Boyd, M.D., D. Ge., Esq. (1978)
- Elizabeth II (1985)
- Rev. Dr. Phillip Potter, Esq. (1988)
- Sir Clarence Seignoret G.C.B., C.O.L., Kt. M., O.S.J., O.B.E., Esq. (1993)
- Sister Alicia De Tremmerie (1994)
- Justice Phillip Telford Georges OCC, Esq. (1996)
- Archbishop Kelvin Felix, Esq. (1999)
- Dame Mary Eugenia Charles (2000)
- H.E. Vernon Lorden Shaw, Esq. (2001)
- Crispin Sorhaindo, Esq. (2001)
- Mrs. Elizabeth Israel (2002)
- The Carib People (2003)
- CARICOM (2006)
- Franklyn Andrew Merrifield Baron, Esq. (2006)
- H.E. Fidel Castro Ruz, Esq. (2008)
- H.E. Eliud Williams, Esq. (2012)
- Charles Savarin, Esq. (2013)
- Dr. Carissa F. Etienne (2015)
- Dr. Lennox Honychurch (2018)
- United Nations Development Programme UNDP (2021)
- Reginald Austrie (2022)
- Narendra Modi (2024)
