= 2018 national electoral calendar =

National and federal elections held in 2018

- Countries with national elections or referendums: Executive Legislative Executive and Legislative Referendum Executive and Referendum Legislative and Referendum Executive, Legislative and Referendum Executive, Legislative and Judicial

This national electoral calendar for 2018 lists the national/federal elections held in 2018 in all sovereign states and their dependent territories. By-elections are excluded, though national referendums are included.

== January ==
- 7 January: Northern Cyprus, Parliament
- 12–13 January: Czech Republic, President (1st round)
- 26–27 January: Czech Republic, President (2nd round)
- 28 January:
  - Cyprus, President (1st round)
  - Finland, President

== February ==
- 4 February:
  - Costa Rica, President (1st round) and Parliament
  - Cyprus, President (2nd round)
  - Ecuador, Referendum
- 11 February: Monaco, Parliament
- 23 February: Djibouti, Parliament
- 26 February: Sint Maarten, Legislature

== March ==
- 4 March:
  - El Salvador, Parliament
  - Italy, Chamber of Deputies and Senate
  - Switzerland, Referendums
- 7 March: Sierra Leone, President and Parliament (1st round)
- 11 March:
  - Colombia, House of Representatives and Senate
  - Cuba, Parliament
- 13 March: Grenada, Parliament
- 18 March: Russia, President
- 21 March:
  - Antigua and Barbuda, Parliament
  - Netherlands, Referendum
- 25 March: Turkmenistan, Assembly and People's Council
- 26–28 March: Egypt, President
- 31 March: Sierra Leone, President and Parliament (2nd round)

== April ==
- 1 April: Costa Rica, President (2nd round)
- 8 April: Hungary, Parliament
- 11 April: Azerbaijan, President
- 15 April:
  - Guatemala, Referendum
  - Montenegro, President
- 20 April: Bhutan, National Council
- 22 April:
  - French Polynesia, Legislature (1st round)
  - Paraguay, President, Chamber of Deputies and Senate
- 24 April: Greenland, Legislature

== May ==
- 6 May:
  - French Polynesia, Legislature (2nd round)
  - Lebanon, Parliament
- 9 May: Malaysia, House of Representatives
- 12 May:
  - East Timor, Parliament
  - Iraq, Parliament
- 13 May: Slovenia, Referendum
- 16 May: Jersey, Legislature
- 17 May: Burundi, Constitutional Referendum
- 20 May: Venezuela, President
- 24 May: Barbados, Parliament
- 25 May: Ireland, Constitutional Referendum
- 27 May: Colombia, President (1st round)

== June ==
- 3 June: Slovenia, National Assembly
- 10 June: Switzerland, Referendums
- 14 June: Cook Islands, Legislature
- 17 June: Colombia, President (2nd round)
- 24 June: Turkey, President and Parliament

== July ==
- 1 July: Mexico, President, Chamber of Deputies and Senate
- 25 July: Pakistan, National Assembly
- 29 July:
  - Cambodia, Parliament
  - Mali, President (1st round)
- 30 July:
  - Comoros, Constitutional Referendum
  - Zimbabwe, President, House of Assembly and Senate

== August ==
- 12 August: Mali, President (2nd round)
- 26 August: Colombia, Referendum

== September ==
- 1 September: Mauritania, Parliament (1st round)
- 2–3 September: Rwanda, Chamber of Deputies
- 9 September: Sweden, Parliament
- 15 September:
  - Bhutan, National Assembly (1st round)
  - Mauritania, Parliament (2nd round)
- 21 September: Eswatini, House of Assembly
- 23 September:
  - Maldives, President
  - Switzerland, Referendums
- 30 September: Republic of Macedonia, Referendum

== October ==
- 5–6 October: Czech Republic, Senate (1st round)
- 6 October:
  - Gabon, National Assembly (1st round)
  - Latvia, Parliament
- 6–7 October: Romania, Constitutional Referendum
- 7 October:
  - Bosnia and Herzegovina, Presidency and House of Representatives
  - Brazil, President (1st round), Chamber of Deputies and Senate
  - Cameroon, President
  - São Tomé and Príncipe, Parliament
- 10 October: Guernsey, Referendum
- 12–13 October: Czech Republic, Senate (2nd round)
- 14 October: Luxembourg, Parliament
- 18 October: Bhutan, National Assembly (2nd round)
- 20 October: Afghanistan, House of the People
- 26 October: Ireland, President and Constitutional Referendum
- 27 October:
  - Afghanistan, House of the People (Kandahar only)
  - Gabon, National Assembly (2nd round)
- 28 October:
  - Brazil, President (2nd round)
  - Georgia, President (1st round)

== November ==
- 4 November: New Caledonia, Independence Referendum
- 6 November:
  - Antigua and Barbuda, Constitutional Referendum
  - Grenada, Constitutional Referendum
  - United States, House of Representatives and Senate
- 7 November: Madagascar, President (1st round)
- 11 November:
  - Donetsk People's Republic, Head and Parliament
  - Luhansk People's Republic, Head and Parliament
- 13 November:
  - United States, House of Representatives (Northern Mariana Islands only)
- 14 November: Fiji, Parliament
- 24 November:
  - Bahrain, Council of Representatives (1st round)
  - Taiwan, Referendums
- 25 November:
  - Liechtenstein, Referendum
  - Switzerland, Referendums
- 28 November: Georgia, President (2nd round)

== December ==
- 1 December: Bahrain, Council of Representatives (2nd round)
- 9 December:
  - Armenia, Parliament
  - Peru, Constitutional Referendum
- 19 December: Madagascar, President (2nd round)
- 20 December: Togo, Parliament
- 30 December:
  - Bangladesh, Parliament
  - Democratic Republic of the Congo, President and National Assembly

== Indirect elections ==
The following indirect elections of heads of state and the upper houses of bicameral legislatures took place through votes in elected lower houses, unicameral legislatures, or electoral colleges:

- 5 January, 28 June, 4 and 25 July, 10, 11 and 13August, 15 and 29 November, 5 and 19 December: Malaysia, Senate
- 16 January, 23 March, and 21 June: India, Council of States
- 19 January: Trinidad and Tobago, President
- 7 February: Nepal, National Assembly
- 15 February: South Africa, President
- 18 February: Bangladesh, President
- 25 February: Cambodia, Senate
- 2 March: Armenia, President
- 3 March: Pakistan, Senate
- 5 March to 20 March: China, President and Premier
- 12 March: Isle of Man, Legislative Council
- 13 March: Nepal, President
- 22 and 28 March, 12 April and 13 June: Austria, Federal Council
- 24 March: Ivory Coast, Senate
- 25 March: Cameroon, Senate
- 28 March: Myanmar, President
- 1 April: San Marino, Captains Regent
- 19 April: Cuba, President
- 31 August: Fiji, President
- 4 September: Pakistan, President
- 1 October:
  - Dominica, President
  - San Marino, Captains Regent
- 2 October: Iraq, President
- 23 October: Vietnam, President
- 25 October: Ethiopia, President
- 29 December: Algeria, Council of the Nation

== See also ==
- 2018 in politics and government
