= 2012 Dominican presidential election =

← 2008	17 September 2012	2013 →
Nominee	Eliud Williams
Party	DLP
Electoral vote	21
Percentage	100%
President before election
Nicholas Liverpool
DLP
Elected President
Eliud Williams
DLP

An indirect presidential election was held on 17 September 2012 to elect a president to finish the term of Nicholas Liverpool, who resigned. Eliud Williams was elected.

== History ==
By July 2012, it was reported by local news in Dominica that incumbent President Nicholas Liverpool was in poor health and planning to resign, with the Government favoring to replace him with retired public servant Eliud Williams.

On 15 August 2012, Prime Minister Roosevelt Skerrit and Opposition Leader Hector John met to consult with each other about a joint nominee for a new president. In the meeting, Skerrit confirmed that President Liverpool had not yet resigned. He further proposed Williams as the government's nominee for president. John opposed Williams's nomination. On 24 August, Speaker Alix Boyd-Knights informed parliament of the failure to agree on a joint nominee, initiating a 14-day nomination period.

John decried the process as unconstitutional and invalid. He claimed that because President Liverpool had not yet resigned, no constitutionally valid consultation between him and the Prime Minister had taken place. The opposition United Workers' Party (UWP) refused to nominate a candidate for the election due to the perceived violation. The Government argued that by doctrine of necessity, it was valid to nominate a new president before the resignation of the current president, thus preventing a vacancy in the office.

The presidential election was held on 17 September 2012. The UWP members of the House boycotted the election. They were instead protesting the election with supporters near the parliament building. Williams received 21 votes from parliament. President Liverpool officially resigned the day of the election, and Williams was sworn in to office the same day.

=== Court case ===
Leader of the UWP, Edison James, expressed an intention to legally challenge the election on 17 September. He called for the intervention of the Organisation of Eastern Caribbean States and the Caribbean Community into the matter. A claim form was filed to the High Court in Roseau on 26 October 2012, challenging the election. Opposition Leader John was the claimant, with the defendants being Prime Minister Skerrit, Speaker Boyd-Knights, and Attorney General Levi Peter.

On 22 February 2013, Judge Lionel Jones ruled that the case should be brought to trial, dismissing the government's attempt to have the case dropped. Judge Jones granted the government's leave to appeal. On 21 May, the Eastern Caribbean Supreme Court (ECSC) refused the government's stay of execution. In November 2013, the ECSC reserved its judgment on the case.

In January 2014, the ECSC ruled in favor of the government. Chief Justice Janice Pereira ruled that "It is no part of the court's function or responsibility to meddle in parliamentary affairs particularly when the Constitution clearly precludes it from so doing."

== Results ==
2012 Dominican presidential election
Candidate	Party	Votes	%
Eliud Williams	Dominica Labour Party	21	100.00
Total		21	100.00
Valid votes		21	100.00
Invalid/blank votes		0	0.00
Total votes		21	100.00
