= 1978 Dominican presidential election =

- 21 December 1978

Nominee	Fred Degazon	John Bully
Party	DLP	DFP
Electoral vote	16	10
Percentage	61.5%	38.4%
President before election
Louis Cools-Lartigue
Elected President
Fred Degazon

An indirect presidential election was held on 21 December 1978 to elect the first President of Dominica. Fred Degazon was elected with the ruling Dominica Labour Party.

== History ==
Dominica had become independent from the United Kingdom on 3 November 1978. Louis Cools-Lartigue, who had previously served as governor-general of Dominica, served as the interim president of the country between the start of independence and the first presidential election was held.

The election was held on 21 December. The House of Assembly voted for the president. The nominee for the ruling Dominica Labour Party (DLP), Fred Degazon, served as speaker of parliament. The candidate for the opposition Dominica Freedom Party (DFP) was John Bully, who had served as finance secretary. Degazon received 16 votes to Bully's 10.

Degazon sworn in on 20 January 1979. The opposition sought legal action against Degazon's election. They argued that it was unconstitutional because Degazon had not been sworn in with 24 hours of being elected.

== Results ==
1978 Dominican presidential election
Candidate	Party	Votes	%
Fred Degazon	Dominica Labour Party	16	61.54
John Bully	Dominica Freedom Party	10	38.46
Total		26	100.00
