= Sisserou Award of Honour =

National award of Dominica

- Type: National Award
- Awarded for: Meritorious service
- Country: Commonwealth of Dominica
- Presented by: Dominica
- Eligibility: Nationals and non-nationals
- Post-nominals: SAH
- Status: Current
- Established: 1967
- Riband of the award

Precedence
- Next (higher): Dominica Award of Honour
- Next (lower): Meritorious Service Award of Dominica

The Sisserou Award of Honour is a national award of the Commonwealth of Dominica. Created in 1967, it is the second highest honour presented by the President of the Commonwealth of Dominica on behalf of the state. The Dominican Awards are sparingly presented, with up to two Sisserou Awards of Honour being granted in any one year.

The award is named after the sisserou, the national bird of Dominica, which is unique to the island. The sisserou also appears on the national flag and coat of arms.

== Insignia ==
The badge of the Sisserou Award of Honour is an oval-shaped golden coloured medallion. The outer ring of the medallion bears the inscription in relief THE SISSEROU AWARD OF HONOUR. The centre of the medallion depicts the Coat of arms of Dominica.

The breast medal is suspended from a ring attached at the top, and hangs from a yellow ribbon with a centre stripe of black bordered on its outside by white.

Grades : One grade

== Notable recipients ==
- Anthony Bailey (born 1970), interfaith campaigner
- Alwin Bully (1948–2023), cultural administrator, playwright, artist, designer of the flag of Dominica (awarded 1985)
- John Fabien (died 2012), health minister (awarded 2011)
- Lennox Honychurch (born 1952), historian (awarded 1987)
- Clem John (born 1941), former cricketer and civil servant (awarded 2002)
- Swinburne Lestrade, economist (awarded 2004)
- Ophelia Marie (born 1951), singer (awarded 1999)
- Charles Savarin (born 1943), President of Dominica (awarded 2006)
- Grayson Shillingford (1944 – 2009), cricketer (awarded 2009)
