= 2013 Dominican presidential election =

- 30 September 2013
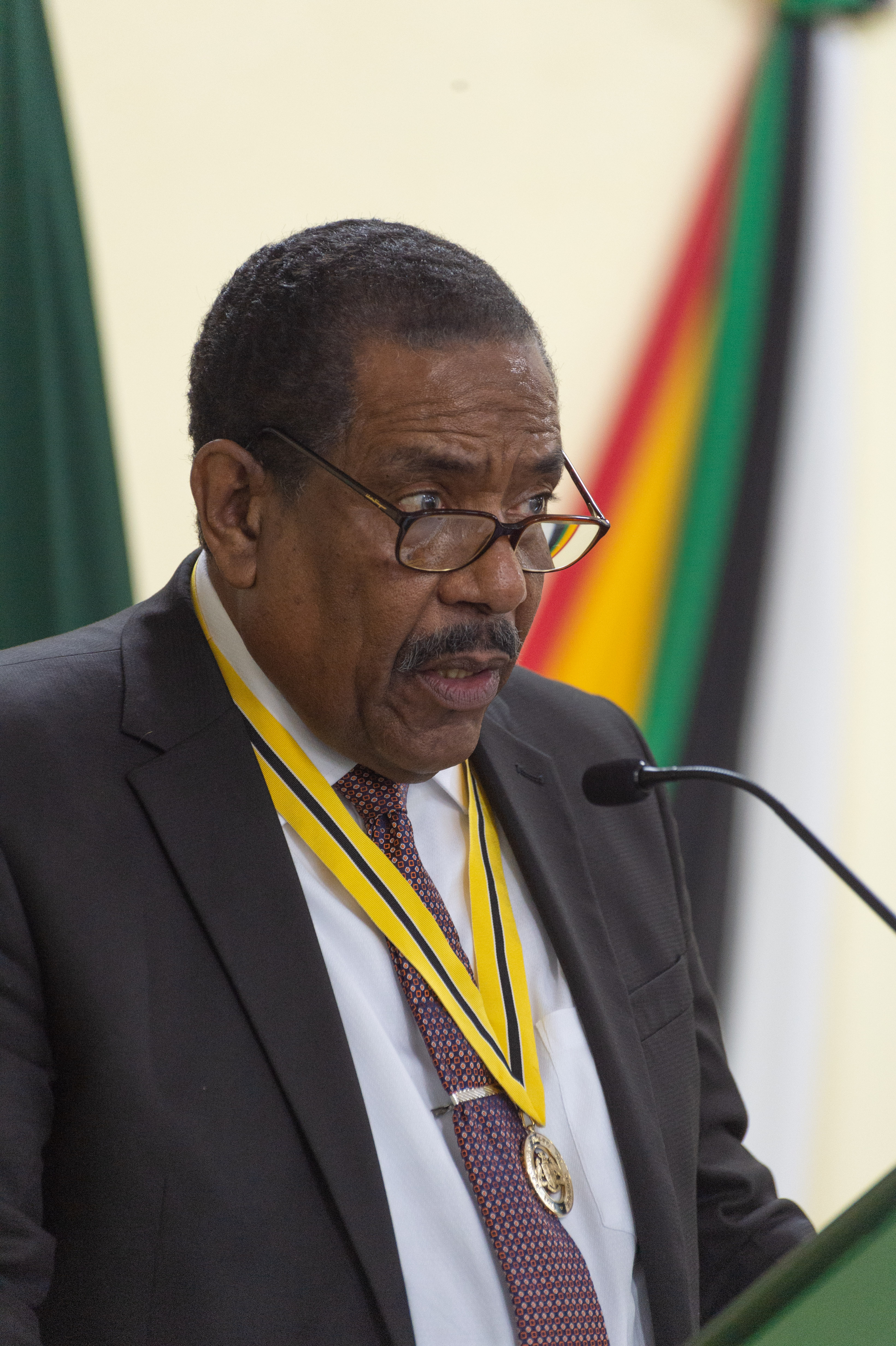

Nominee	Charles Savarin	Dorothy Leevy
Party	DLP	UWP
Electoral vote	19	0
Percentage	100%	0%
President before election
Eliud Williams
DLP
Elected President
Charles Savarin
DLP

An indirect presidential election was held on 30 September 2013 to elect the next President of Dominica. Charles Savarin was elected.

== History ==
President Eliud Williams was elected in 2012 to complete the term of President Nicholas Liverpool, who resigned due to poor health. Williams's term expired in October 2013. Despite President Williams being willing to continue his term, the Government did not consult him in regard to renomination.

On 2 September 2013, Prime Minister Roosevelt Skerrit and Opposition Leader Hector John met to negotiate a presidential nominee. The Government's nominee was then House Speaker Alix Boyd-Knights. On 5 September, Skerrit notified the Speaker that there was no agreement between him and John on a joint nominee, sparking a 14-day nomination period.

Boyd-Knights's nomination was strongly opposed by the opposition United Workers' Party (UWP). Party leader Lennox Linton claimed she was biased against the UWP. On 4 September, he called for protests against her nomination. The Dominica Freedom Party also opposed Boyd-Knights's nomination. By 7 September, Boyd-Knights withdrew her candidacy. Skerrit claimed the withdrawal was due to "inflammatory statements and comments" from the opposition, as well as concerns for the safety of her family. The UWP had planned to host a protest on 10 September.

On 10 September, the Government had selected a new nominee for president: retired Permanent Secretary of the Ministry of Education Jennifer Wallace-Lafond. On around 11 September, the opposition expressed conditional support for Wallace-Lafond, so long as she was a qualified and constitutional nominee. The House of Assembly was notified by the Speaker on 12 September there was no agreement between the prime minister and opposition leader on a joint nominee, triggering the 14-day nomination period. By 25 September, Wallace-Lafond withdrew her candidacy, due to her dual-citizenship making her ineligible for the presidency.

By 25 September, National Security Minister and Senator Charles Savarin was chosen as the next Government nominee for president. On 25 September, Savarin resigned as government minister and as senator to accept the presidency. Linton claimed Savarin's nomination was unconstitutional and called for him to withdraw his candidacy. Linton further called for protest and legal action. Attorney General Levi Peter said Savarin's nomination was constitutional. Near the end of the nomination period, the UWP selected their nominee for president: Dorothy Leevy, a former high school principal.

The vote for president occurred on 30 September. According to The Sun Dominica, the government "anticipated trouble" and "deployed dozens of police officers to direct pedestrians around erected barricades" near the parliament building. There were 19 Government members of the House present. The UWP boycotted the House sitting. All present members voted for Savarin. On 1 October, the UWP claimed it would not recognize Savarin as president and boycott his events.

Savarin was sworn in on 2 October.

== Results ==
2013 Dominican presidential election
Candidate	Party	Votes	%
Charles Savarin	Dominica Labour Party	19	100.00
Dorothy Leevy	United Workers' Party	0	0.00
Total		19	100.00
Valid votes		19	100.00
Invalid/blank votes		0	0.00
Total votes		19	100.00
