= 2018 Dominican presidential election =

- 1 October 2018
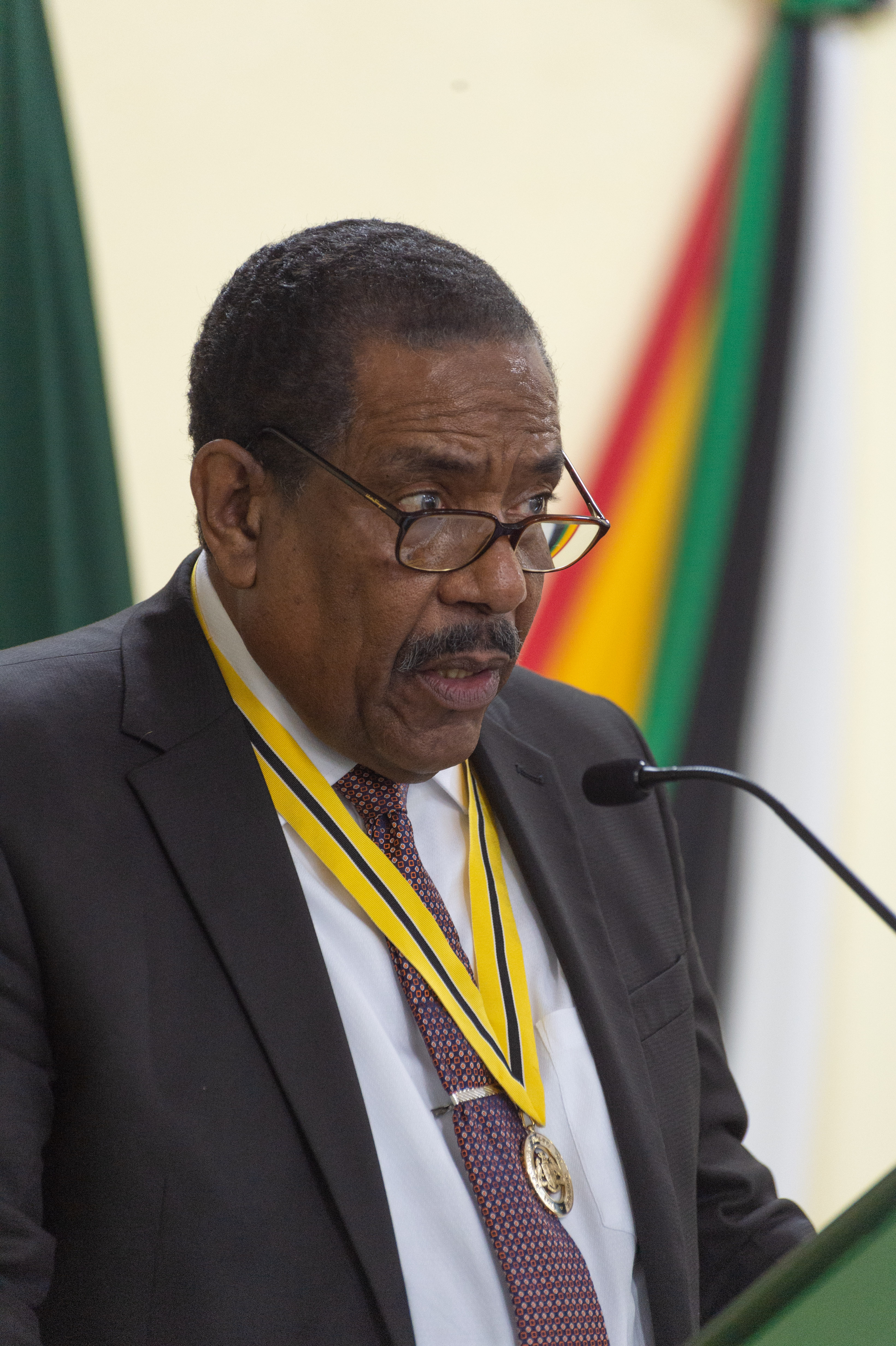
Nominee	Charles Savarin
Party	DLP
Electoral vote	20
Percentage	100%
President before election
Charles Savarin
DLP
Elected President
Charles Savarin
DLP

An indirect presidential election was held on 1 October 2023 to elect the next President of Dominica. Incumbent President Charles Savarin was re-elected.

== History ==
Charles Savarin was first elected president on 30 September 2013.

The Constitution of Dominica stipulates the presidential nomination process. Firstly, the prime minister and opposition leader are to come together in an attempt to produce a joint presidential nominee. If this fails, the two are to nominate their own candidates, with House of Assembly also being able to nominate candidates. The nomination period is to last 14 days after the Speaker informs the House of its beginning. Following this period, the House of Assembly is to vote for president.

Prime Minister Roosevelt Skerrit claimed he had written to Opposition Leader Lennox Linton on 3 August 2018 about his intention to renominate president Savarin. Skerrit further claimed Linton responded that he was going to solicit names for nominations of his own, but that Linton did not respond further after this. After Lennox's failure to produce a candidate, by 28 September, Skerritt claimed the government was going to proceed with the presidential election on 1 October.

The opposition United Workers' Party (UWP) claimed the election was unconstitutional. The Speaker had informed the House of the beginning of the nomination period on 20 September. To comply with the constitution, the UWP argued the election would have to be held after 4 October, to allow for the 14 day nomination period. Skerrit argued that by doctrine of necessity, it was permissible to hold the presidential election before the expiration of the president's term.

The election was held on 1 October, despite opposition claims of unconstitutionality. All 20 House members of the government Dominica Labour Party (DLP) voted for President Savarin. The UWP members staged a walkout in protest of the election.

Savarin was sworn in on 2 October.

== Results ==
2018 Dominican presidential election
Candidate	Party	Votes	%
Charles Savarin	Dominica Labour Party	20	100.00
Total		20	100.00
Valid votes		20	100.00
Invalid/blank votes		0	0.00
Total votes		20	100.00
Registered voters/turnout		32	62.50
