= Alick Lazare =

Dominican novelist (born 1937)

- Born: Alick Lazare; 17 October 1937 (age 88); Roseau, Dominica
- Occupations: Novelist, poet and financial consultant
- Years active: 1948–
- Known for: awarded the Sisserou Award of Honour, writer and poet

Alick Lazare (born 19 October 1937) is a Dominican novelist, poet and financial consultant for the Dominican government. In 1981, Lazare was awarded the Sisserou Award of Honour for meritorious public service to the Commonwealth of Dominica.

== Early life ==
Born in Roseau, Lazare spent his early years with his grandmother in Guadeloupe during the Second World War. In the 1940s he returned to Dominica. In 1948, he received a scholarship from the New York Charitable Society to attend Dominica High School.

== Career ==
After graduation, Lazare worked for the Government of Dominica, ultimately as Financial Secretary and Fiscal Advisor.

Lazare writes from the perspective of his subjects and presents colonial history accordingly. Lazare examines early documents to offer a detailed description of Dominica before independence.

== Personal life ==
He lives in retirement in Dominica and devotes his time to researching the early history of the island.

== Books ==
- Dominican short stories: volume 1. Roseau,1974. Arts Council of Dominica, Writers Workshop.
- Carib and the other stories. 1996. Paperbacks Ltd. Roseau, Commonwealth of Dominica.
- Nature Island Verses. 27 July 2001. iUniverse Editions. ISBN 0595194141, 0595194141
- Pharcel: Runaway Slave. Novel. iUniverse Editions. ISBN 0595395783, 978-0595395781
- Writers of Dominica 1920–2020: An Anthology of Writings by Writers of Dominica. 8 July 2022. Emmanuel Publishing House. ISBN 9769627992, 978-9769627994
- Kalinago Blood. 3 September 2025. Kindle Editions. ASIN B0FPPMZYVR

== Awards ==
- 1981 – Sisserou Award of Honour for meritorious service to the Commonwealth of Dominica
