= 2016 Dutch Ukraine–European Union Association Agreement referendum =

2016 Dutch referendum

- 6 April 2016
- Are you for or against the Approval Act of the Association Agreement between the European Union and Ukraine?

Results
Choice	Votes	%
For	1,571,874	38.21%
Against	2,509,395	61.00%
Blank votes	32,344	0.79%
Valid votes	4,113,613	99.08%
Invalid votes	38,000	0.92%
Total votes	4,151,613	100.00%
Eligible to vote/turnout	12,862,658	32.28%
- Results by municipality For Against
- Suspensory, non-binding referendum which has effect when a simple majority votes "Against" and turnout is at least 30%.

An advisory referendum on the approval of the Ukraine–European Union Association Agreement was held in the Netherlands on 6 April 2016. The referendum question was: "Are you for or against the Approval Act of the Association Agreement between the European Union and Ukraine?"

With a turnout of 32.28%, the threshold for a valid referendum was met. 61% of the votes cast were against the Approval Act, and 38.2% in favour. This accounted for 19.5% of eligible voters voting against and 12.2% voting in favour. As the Act was rejected, the States General had to enact a follow-up law to either repeal the Act or put it into effect after all. The referendum was the first since the enactment of the Advisory Referendum Act (Dutch: Wet raadgevend referendum) on 1 July 2015, with the Dutch tapping law referendum in 2018 to be the second.

The decision to hold a referendum was made after more than 427,000 valid requests were received within six weeks, more than the required number of 300,000 requests. The referendum was suspensory and non-binding, and following the rejection the Government had to propose "zo spoedig mogelijk" (English: as soon as possible/at the earliest convenience) a new act to either gain parliamentary approval for either retraction of the approval act or for its entry into force. The government secured an additional agreement between the 28 Member States of the European Union addressing what were according to the government the concerns of the no-vote in December 2016. The additional agreement did not change the association agreement and neither Ukraine nor the European Union or Euratom were parties to the additional agreement. Following the approval of the additional agreement, a new law was passed approving the Association Agreement in May 2017, enabling the Netherlands to deposit its instrument of ratification on 15 June 2017. The association agreement entered into force on 1 September 2017.

== Background ==
=== Advisory Referendum Act ===
In the Netherlands, before the Advisory Referendum Act's repeal in 2018, most types of primary laws could be subjected to a suspensory, non-binding referendum after royal assent and proclamation. The request procedure of a referendum consists of two stages. For the initial request, 10,000 requests have to be received within four weeks after proclamation of the law. After the requirements for this stage are met, 300,000 requests have to be received within six weeks after the completion of the initial request.

=== Association Agreement ===
The Ukraine–European Union Association Agreement is a treaty between the European Union (EU), Euratom, their 28 Member States and Ukraine that establishes a political and economic association between the parties. The parties committed to co-operate and converge economic policy, legislation, and regulation across a broad range of areas, including equal rights for workers, steps towards visa-free movement of people, the exchange of information and staff in the area of justice, the modernisation of Ukraine's energy infrastructure, and access to the European Investment Bank. The parties committed to regular summit meetings, and meetings among ministers, other officials, and experts. The agreement furthermore establishes a Deep and Comprehensive Free Trade Area between the parties. The agreement enters into force upon ratification by all parties, but parts of the agreement are already applied provisionally.

The Ukraine–European Union Association Agreement Approval Act was voted upon in the House of Representatives and Senate in 2015. People's Party for Freedom and Democracy (VVD), Labour Party (PvdA), Democrats 66 (D66), Christian Democratic Appeal (CDA), ChristianUnion (CU), GreenLeft (GL), Reformed Political Party (SGP), 50PLUS, Group Kuzu/Öztürk and independent MPs Houwers, Klein and Van Vliet voted in favour. Socialist Party, Party for Freedom, Groep Bontes/Van Klaveren and Party for the Animals voted against. The parties voted correspondingly in the Senate and the Independent Senate Group voted in favour. The Act received royal assent on 8 July 2015. The Minister of Foreign Affairs published a decision in the Staatscourant on the same day, at which point the law became eligible for a referendum.

Pending its entry into force, specific parts of the Agreement have been applied provisionally since 1 November 2014 and 1 January 2016 (Deep and Comprehensive Free Trade Area). According to Minister of Foreign Affairs Bert Koenders, this concerns about 70% of the Agreement, covering exclusive competence of the European Union.

== Request ==
GeenPeil, a cooperation between the website GeenStijl and the organisations Burgercomité EU and Forum voor Democratie, organised the campaign to collect the required signatures. They deployed a web application to collect, print and deliver the signatures to the Dutch Electoral Council (Kiesraad). Burgercomité EU is an organisation run by Pepijn van Houwelingen, Arjan van Dixhoorn, and Beata Supheert.

Stage	Required	Received	Valid
Preliminary requests	10,000	14,441	13,480
Definitive requests	300,000	472,849	427,939

On 14 October 2015, the Electoral Council held that both stages had been completed. An appeal was lodged with the adjudicative division of the Council of State, challenging the use of the web application to collect the signatures. On 26 October, the Council held that the claimant had no legal standing and dismissed the appeal. The Referendum Committee announced on 29 October that the referendum would be held on 6 April 2016.

== Initial reactions ==
In response to parliamentary questions, Prime Minister Mark Rutte said that he would await the course of the referendum and its result to decide how to move forward. A majority in the House of Representatives, with the exception of VVD and D66, subsequently declared that they would respect the outcome of the referendum if the turnout exceeded 30% even if it is not binding.

A March 2016 survey found that 72% of Ukrainians wanted the Dutch to vote "yes", 13% wanted them to vote "no" and 15% were undecided. According to former Prime Minister and Minister for Foreign Affairs of Sweden Carl Bildt, "Were the European Union to turn its back on Ukraine and tear up the agreement – which is what the 'No' side in the Dutch debate wants – there is little doubt that this would encourage further Russian destabilisation of and aggression against Ukraine." The United States Department of State said that it is "in the interest of the United States, of the Netherlands, of the EU to help ensure that Ukraine becomes a democratic and economically stable country."

== Campaign ==
For a 'For' vote	No official party position	For a 'Against' vote
VVD; PvdA; CDA; Democrats 66; GroenLinks	ChristianUnion; SGP; 50PLUS	Party for the Animals; Party for Freedom; Socialist Party; VoorNederland

The government strategy for its campaign included the advice to call the Association Agreement a "cooperation agreement ("samenwerkingsverdrag") instead of an association agreement and to highlight trade as a key component of the agreement.

According to Robert van Voren, proponents of the referendum were able to "accumulate four times the maximum campaign subsidy they were allowed to receive from the Dutch Government". He said that a businessman supporting the "no" campaign had been granted €50,000 and organisers of the referendum had received funds for campaigns "against", "in favour" and "neutral", but the latter two were "so cleverly written that they too evoked an "against" feeling".

Open Society Foundations, a non-profit organization led by American billionaire George Soros, announced to the NOS that it would spend €200,000 on a "yes" campaign.

In April 2016, the European Parliament began investigating the use of a European subsidy to buy a full-page advertisement in De Telegraaf to gather signatures in favour of holding the referendum. Nigel Farage said he had helped arrange financing for the advertisement.

== Opinion polls ==
Date(s) conducted	For	Against	Undecided	Sample	Conducted by
30 March–1 April 2016	25%	40%	13% undecided, 11% leaning for, 12% leaning against	27,253	EenVandaag
25–28 March 2016	36%	47%	18%	2,382	I&O Research
13–20 March 2016	40%	60%	N/A	3,000+	Peil.nl
4–7 March 2016	33%	44%	23%	2,510	I&O Research
21–25 February 2016	19%	30%	22% undecided, 14% leaning for, 15% leaning against	29,650	EenVandaag
29 January–8 February 2016	32%	38%	30%	2,388	I&O Research
1–7 February 2016	40%	60%	N/A	3,000+	Peil.nl
12–21 January 2016	31%	38%	31%	2,550	I&O Research
18–28 December 2015	13%	51%	13% leaning for, 23% leaning against	27,151	EenVandaag
3–20 December 2015	25%	41%	34%	3,490	I&O Research

== Results ==
Referendums under the Advisory Referendum Act were not binding. To be valid, a turnout of at least 30% of eligible voters was required and a simple majority (over 50%) defined the result. In the event of a valid vote against the Act, the States General had to enact a new law either to repeal the Act or to provide for its entry into force. As long as the Approval Act has not entered into force, the instrument of ratification cannot be deposited by the Netherlands, as a result of which the agreement as a whole cannot enter into force.

The referendum was valid: the turnout was roughly 32.3%, and the treaty was rejected with 61% of voters voting against it, and 38.2% of voters voting for it.

On 18 November 2016, Stichting KiezersOnderzoek Nederland, an independent academic organisation, published a report on the referendum results, which had been anticipated by the Dutch Government. Amongst other things, the organisation investigated the opponents' motives for voting against. According to the report, for the largest group of "against" voters (34.1%), corruption in Ukraine was the predominant motive. For the second-largest group, it was the 'fear of Ukraine membership of the EU'.

A 2023 study found that euroskepticism or support for the EU was a strong predictor of how individuals voted in the referendum. Views on the EU were a stronger predictor of vote choice than concerns about Russia.

== Reactions ==
=== Dutch Government ===
Rutte responded that if the turnout was above 30 percent with such a large margin of victory for the "No" camp, then his sense was that ratification could not simply go ahead. The leader of the coalition Labour Party, Diederik Samsom, also felt that they could not ratify the treaty in this fashion.

The Dutch Government campaigned in favour of the agreement. Rutte said that it is good for the European Union and the Netherlands and not to be seen as a first step to Ukraine's EU membership, saying: "We are a trading nation. We live by free trade agreements and Ukraine is another example of this [...] People who are inclined to vote No think it's a first step to EU membership. It has nothing to do with accession."

=== Academia ===
Sijbren de Jong, writing in the EU Observer, said that the referendum was "curious": "It is a treaty of the kind the EU has with many countries: think Moldova, Jordan, Chile, and many others. [...] Interestingly, not a soul raised a finger back when these agreements were negotiated." Writing for the Kyiv Post, Jan Germen Janmaat and Taras Kuzio reported that the treaty's opponents were using "stereotypes, half-truths and demeaning propaganda" against Ukraine. Janmaat and Kuzio said that the no campaign "repeats Russian disinformation" and De Jong said that their arguments show "immediate parallels" with the Russian state media's portrayal of Ukraine. Andreas Umland called the result of the referendum "a propaganda triumph for Putin", "a lasting embarrassment for the Dutch nation", and "a public humiliation of millions of Ukrainians who, during the last years, have been fighting both peacefully and, on eastern Ukrainian battlefields, with arms for their national liberation and European integration." Opponents of the agreement, such as writer Leon de Winter, said that it goes well beyond the trade agreement and includes also political and military support. The Party for the Animals said that support for Ukraine was "problematic", calling it "the most corrupt country on the European continent".

=== Ukrainian authorities ===
According to Ukrainian President Petro Poroshenko, "the true goal of the Dutch referendum [was] to attack Europe's unity". This view was echoed by Anne Applebaum in Slate who cited the Dutch referendum as a good example of how Russian influence actually works in a Western European election, though she did not know how much the referendum was influenced by Russian propaganda. The European Commission proposed granting visa-free travel to Ukrainians despite the Dutch referendum vote against an EU-Ukraine agreement, with an anonymous "senior EU source" saying that "It may look as if we're ignoring the Dutch voters, but we have to keep our word to Ukraine". On 24 November 2016, it was announced that a ninety-day visa free period might eventually be granted for Ukrainian citizens with a biometric passport for the Schengen area.

=== Dutch press ===
In an interview with the Burgercomité EU, the members admitted they didn't really care about Ukraine at all, but are against the political system of the EU. After the referendum journalists started investigating the people of this organization and found out founding member Pepijn van Houwelingen had published a book under a pseudonym. NRC Handelsblad, De Dagelijkse Standaard and De Groene Amsterdammer raised questions about the political motives of van Houwelingen, since, according to them, the book romanticized fascism, repression and nationalism.

== Aftermath ==
The Dutch government established several main points that in their opinion were the reason for the vote against the treaty. The government negotiated with the other EU member states about an addendum and clarification to the treaty to remove these objections. It was concluded in December 2016 by all EU member states with the following points:

1. no establishment of EU candidate status to Ukraine through this agreement
2. no guarantees of military aid or security guarantees to Ukraine
3. no freedom of Ukrainians to reside or work in the EU
4. no increases of bilateral financial support to Ukraine based on the agreement
5. the goal to work towards reduction of corruption in Ukraine, and (as a last resort) to suspend the Agreement if not enough progress is made.

The addendum was approved by the EU member states, but not by the European Union or Ukraine. Afterwards, a new ratification act was submitted to parliament. In February 2017, the House of Representatives passed the agreement with 89 votes in favour and 55 against. In May 2017 the Senate passed the agreement with 50 votes in favour and 25 against. This meant that the agreement was accepted by the Dutch parliament. The Netherlands subsequently deposited its instrument of ratification in June 2017, thus finalising its ratification period. The addendum entered into force upon the deposit of the instrument of ratification. After the deposit, the European Union and Euratom did so as well, allowing for entry into force of the agreement on 1 September 2017.

The referendum was not an issue in the Dutch general election in March 2017, except for Forum for Democracy which used the issue in the campaign and that went from zero to two seats in the parliament and supported a "no" vote.

== See also ==
- Malaysia Airlines Flight 17
- Netherlands–Ukraine relations
- Ukraine–European Union relations
- Referendums in the Netherlands
