= Kees Verhoeven =

Dutch politician and geographer

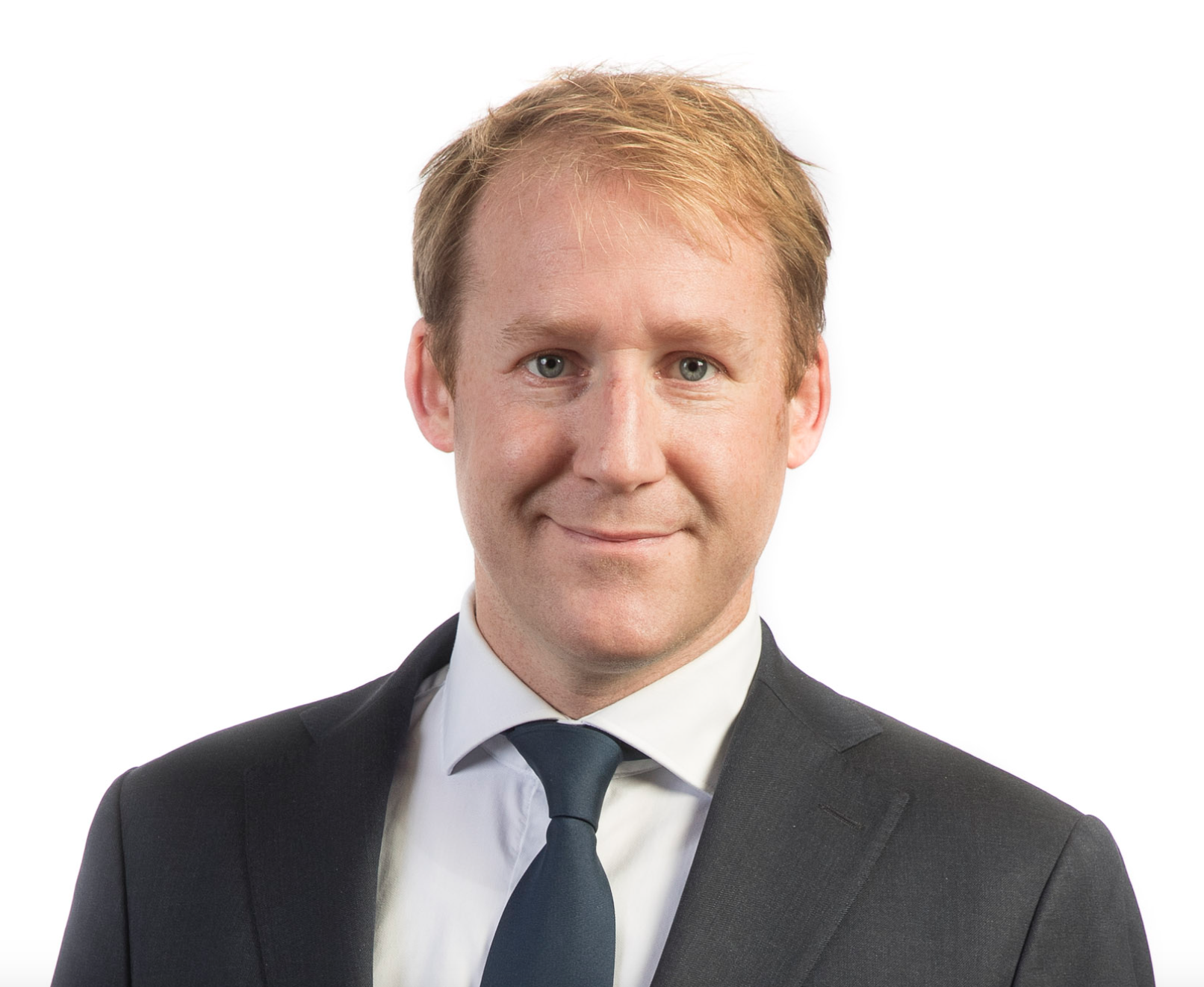
- Verhoeven in 2017

Member of the House of Representatives
- In office 17 June 2010 – 30 March 2021

Personal details
- Born: 25 April 1976 (age 50) Utrecht, Netherlands
- Party: Democrats 66
- Education: Utrecht University
- Occupation: Politician; Geographer

Kees Verhoeven (born 25 April 1976) is a Dutch politician of the Democrats 66 (D66) party, serving as a member of the House of Representatives since 17 June 2010. A geographer by occupation, he was first elected during the 2010 Dutch general election and was reelected in the 2012 and 2017 elections. He focuses on matters of economic affairs, housing, spatial planning and infrastructure.

== Private career ==
Verhoeven was born in Utrecht and studied economic geography at Utrecht University. He first worked as a teacher in Antigua Guatemala before joining the chamber of commerce (Dutch: Kamer van Koophandel) in Amsterdam in 2002. Before entering the House, he served as director of MKB-Amsterdam and later regional director for North Holland by MKB-Nederland, the organisation promoting small and medium-sized enterprises in the Netherlands.

== Political engagement ==
First elected to the House of Representatives in 2010, he was named leader of the D66 campaign for the 2012 elections. As a parliamentarian he was president of the Temporary House Prices Commission (Tijdelijke commissie Huizenprijzen), which enquired the cost development and pricing in the housing market.

Verhoeven was named the leader of the D66 campaign for the 2014 Dutch municipal elections; since the 2017 general election he has been his party's spokesman for matters concerning European Affairs, Anti-terrorism, Intelligence services, Privacy and Gambling games. He was therefore very present in the media during the 2018 Dutch Intelligence and Security Services Act referendum campaign.

== Honours ==
- Knight in the Order of Orange-Nassau
