= Eden Bowers =

Dominican politician

Eden A. Bowers

Speaker of the House of Assembly of Dominica
- In office 19 June 1979 – August 1980
- Prime Minister: Oliver Seraphin
- Preceded by: Pershing Waldron
- Succeeded by: Marie Davis Pierre

Personal details
- Party: Dominica Labour Party

Eden Bowers was a Dominican politician who served as Speaker of the House of Assembly of Dominica during turbulent times of June 1979. He was a member of Dominica Labour Party.

He was elected to the House of Assembly of Dominica in the 1975 elections from Vieille Case.

Bowers served as deputy speaker of the House of Assembly of Dominica. He was elected as Speaker of the House on 19 June 1979, when Prime Minister Patrick John and the incumbent speaker Pershing Waldron were absent. President Fred Degazon had already fled the country to England. Oliver Seraphin was subsequently elected as Prime Minister. Bowers was not re-elected in the 1980 elections when Labour part lost all its seats in the House of Assembly.

Bowers currently lives in Toronto, Canada.
