= Joseph Isaac =

Dominican politician

Speaker of the House of Assembly of Dominica
- Incumbent
- Assumed office 10 February 2020
- Prime Minister: Roosevelt Skerrit
- Preceded by: Alix Boyd Knights

Personal details
- Born: 14 January 1969 (age 57)
- Party: United Workers'; Dominica Labour
- Education: Clifton Dupigny Community College; New Mexico State University (BS, BA); Georgia State University (MBA)

Joseph Isaac (born 14 January 1969) is a Dominican politician who has been the Speaker of the House of Assembly of Dominica since 2020. He was a member of the assembly from 2015 to 2020, as a member of the United Workers' and Dominica Labour parties.

== Early life and education ==
Joseph Isaac was born on 14 January 1969. He attended Roseau Boys School, Dominica Grammar School, and graduated from Clifton Dupigny Community College in 1988. He graduated from New Mexico State University with a Bachelor of Science in industrial engineering and a Bachelor of Arts in economics in 1992, and Georgia State University with a Master of Business Administration in 2002. He was president of the Caribbean Student Association at New Mexico State University.

== Career ==
Isaac taught physics, mathematics, and chemistry at the Dominica Grammar School. He was a consultant for industrial engineering companies. After graduating from Georgia State University he worked for the Organisation of Eastern Caribbean States as a engineering consultant.

In the 2014 election Isaac was the United Workers' Party (UWP) nominee for a seat in the House of Assembly of Dominica from the Roseau Central Constituency and defeated Dominica Labour Party (DLP) nominee Alvin L. Bernard. However, he joined the DLP in April 2018, and was given the position of Minister for Environment, Climate Resilient, Disaster Management and Urban Renewal. During his tenure in the assembly he was a member of the Public Accounts committee and chair of the Constituency Boundaries Commission.

Isaac ran for a seat from Roseau North Constituency as the DLP nominee, but was defeated by Daniel Lugay in the 2019 election. Prime Minister Roosevelt Skerrit nominated Isaac to succeed Alix Boyd Knights as Speaker on 17 December 2019. He was elected speaker on 10 February 2020, and reelected in 6 February 2023.

== Works cited ==
=== News ===
- "Joseph Isaac Nominated for House Speaker". Dominica Vibes. 18 December 2019. Archived from the original on 22 November 2021.

=== Web ===
- "2014 General Elections Results". Electoral Office. Archived from the original on 10 August 2024.
- "CPA Post-Election Seminar: Dominica Report" (PDF). Commonwealth Parliamentary Association. 25 September 2020. Archived (PDF) from the original on 25 February 2025.
- "Dominica". Inter-Parliamentary Union. Archived from the original on 27 June 2025.
