= Neva Edwards =

Dominican politician (born 1931)

Speaker of the House of Assembly of Dominica
- In office 1 November 1993 – 2 August 1995
- Prime Minister: Eugenia Charles
- Preceded by: Crispin Sorhaindo
- Succeeded by: Osborne Symes

Personal details
- Born: Neva Augustina Edwards; 1931 (age 94–95)

Neva Augustina Edwards (born 1931) is an educator, lay preacher and former civil servant in Dominica. She served as Speaker of the House of Assembly of Dominica from 1993 to 1995.

At the Dominica Social Centre, Edwards served as manager of four NGO programs, including the Early Childhood Program. As president of the Dominica National Council of Women, in 1997 she set up a Family Crisis Counseling Program for women and men, designed to prevent domestic violence and help both survivors and perpetrators. She has also been a lay preacher in the Methodist Church.

Edwards received the Meritorious Service Award in 1991. In 1999, she was nominated by the Dominica National Council of Women for the Caricom Award for Women in 1999. In 2011, she was inducted into a Heroes Park in the village of Marigot.
