= Eustace Francis =

Dominican politician

Eustace Hazelwood Francis

Speaker of the House of Assembly of Dominica
- In office October 1970 – March 1977
- Premier: Edward Oliver LeBlanc; Patrick John
- Preceded by: George Austin Winston
- Succeeded by: Fred Degazon

Personal details
- Political party: Dominica Labour Party

Eustace Hazelwood Francis was a Dominican attorney and politician who served as Speaker of the House of Assembly of Dominica.

Francis was an attorney by profession, and served as attorney general.

Francis was one of the founders of Dominica Freedom Party. He later became a member of Dominica Labour Party. He was regarded as one of former Prime Minister Patrick John's "Dynamic 21".

Francis was elected as Speaker of the House of Assembly of Dominica in October 1970 and he served until March 1977. He was elected to the House of Assembly of Dominica in the 1975 elections from Newtown. He run against Ronald Armour.

Francis was Minister for Home Affairs and Housing from July 1979 to July 1980. He was not re-elected in the 1980 elections when Labour part lost all its seats in the House of Assembly.
