= Marie Davis Pierre =

Dominican politician

Speaker of the House of Assembly of Dominica
- In office 13 August 1980 – 29 December 1988
- Prime Minister: Eugenia Charles
- Preceded by: Eden Bowers
- Succeeded by: Crispin Sorhaindo

Personal details
- Born: 12 March 1918
- Died: 24 May 2014 (aged 96)

Marie Davis Pierre (12 March 1918 – 24 May 2014) was a Dominican public servant who served as Speaker of the House of Assembly from 1980 to 1988.

== Early life and education ==
The daughter of Pauline Charles Davis and William Lionel Davis, she was born on 12 March 1918 in Dominica. She attended the Convent High School in Pointe Michel.

== Career ==
In 1937, Davis Pierre started a kindergarten called the St David School.

Davis Pierre joined the civil service in 1944 and became Deputy Registrar in 1965. In 1967, when Dominica became an Associated state of Great Britain, she became Clerk of the House.

Davis Pierre wrote a book, Parliamentary Practice and Working Methods of the Dominica House of Assembly, which was published in 1975.

On 3 November 1978, Dominica became a republic and Davis Pierre organised the Windsor Park meeting of parliament where the constitutional instruments were handed over to Premier Patrick John by Princess Margaret. She retired from the civil service in December 1978.

Davis Pierre was appointed as Speaker of the House of Assembly by Prime Minister Eugenia Charles in August 1980 under the Dominica Freedom Party administration. She was the first woman to hold the role and served in the position until December 1988. She wrote the Standing Order of the House of Assembly in 1986.

== Personal life ==
Davis Pierre was a devout Catholic and served as a catechist and member of the Roseau Cathedral Cathedral choir for 56 years.

== Death ==
Davis Pierre died on 24 May 2014, aged 96. The Government of Dominica declared Wednesday, 4 June 2014, the day of her funeral, an official day of mourning. Her funeral was held at the St. Gerard’s Hall Chapel and she was buried at Roseau Roman Catholic Cemetery.
