= Alix Boyd Knights =

Dominican politician (died 2023)

The Honourable Alix Boyd Knights

Speaker of the House of Assembly of Dominica
- In office 17 April 2000 – 10 February 2020
- Prime Minister: Rosie Douglas; Pierre Charles; Osborne Riviere; Roosevelt Skerrit
- Preceded by: Osborne Symes
- Succeeded by: Joseph Isaac

Personal details
- Born: Eileen Alix Boyd; 28 December 1944 Dominica
- Died: 3 August 2023 (aged 78)

Alix Boyd-Knights (28 December 1944 — 29 August 2023) was a Dominican politician and attorney who was the Speaker of the House of Assembly from 2000 to 2020.

== Early life & education ==
Eileen Alix Boyd was born in Dominica to parents Alec David Boyd and Eileen Marguerite Shillingford Grell. By 12 years old she had decided on pursuing a career in law. She had a Bachelor of Laws degree from University of the West Indies and a degree from Hugh Wooding Law School, Trinidad and Tobago.

== Career ==
Boyd Knights was first elected Speaker on 17 April 2000 and was re-elected on 27 July 2005, 4 February 2010 and 20 February 2015. Upon her election to a third term on 4 February 2010, she became the longest serving Speaker in Dominica's history.

In 2013, she was initially nominated by the Dominica Labour Party led government to become the next President of Dominica. She stepped down as the speaker in 2020, and was awarded title Speaker Emeritus.

Alix Boyd Knights died on 29 August 2023. She was given a state funeral.
