= Pershing Waldron =

Dominican politician

Speaker of the House of Assembly of Dominica
- In office 4 January 1979 – 19 June 1979
- Prime Minister: Patrick John
- Preceded by: Fred Degazon
- Succeeded by: Eden Bowers

Personal details
- Born: Pershing Albert Rock Waldron; 4 April 1945
- Died: 9 July 2019 (aged 74)

Pershing Waldron was a Dominican politician who served as Speaker of the House of Assembly of Dominica during the turbulent times of June 1979.

Waldron was born on 4 April 1945. He worked in senior positions at Barclays Bank in Dominica, Antigua and St. Vincent. He also worked as manager at Antigua Commercial Bank. He also headed the TCI Bank in the Turks and Caicos Islands.

Waldron served as the Speaker of the House of Assembly of Dominica from 4 January 1979 until 19 June 1979. He had already resigned as the speaker on 13 June 1979. After the 1980 elections, he was appointed an opposition senator in October 1980 until his resignation on 31 January 1981.

Waldron died on 9 July 2019.
