= Osborne Symes =

Dominican politician (born 1937)

Speaker of the House of Assembly of Dominica
- In office 3 August 1995 – 16 April 2000
- Prime Minister: Edison James
- Preceded by: Neva Edwards
- Succeeded by: Alix Boyd Knights

Personal details
- Born: Frederick Osborne George Symes; 31 August 1937
- Died: 12 March 2013 (aged 75)

Frederick Osborne George Symes was a Dominican civil servant who served as Speaker of the House of Assembly of Dominica during United Workers Party administration from 1995 to 2000.

Symes was born in Roseau on 31 August 1937. He worked as an accountant by profession and served in the treasury department of Ministry of Finance of Dominica. He also acted as cabinet secretary on occasion. He retired from the public service in 1993. In 1995, Symes was approached by the UWP to be nominated as Speaker of the House of Assembly of Dominica, and he accepted the nomination. He was replaced following UWP loss in the 2000 elections. He worked for eight years as a director in National Bank of Dominica.

Symes died of heart failure on 12 March 2013. He received a state funeral.
