= Swinburne Lestrade =

Dominican economist

Swinburne A. S. Lestrade is a Dominican economist who served as Director General of the Organisation of Eastern Caribbean States from 1995 to 2000.

He graduated with a bachelor's and master's degree in economics from the University of the West Indies, and an MSc in development economics from the University of East Anglia. He was previously Chairman of the National Bank of Dominica.

He also served as Dominica's Ambassador to the Organization of American States, and to the United States.

He was awarded the Sisserou Award of Honour in 2004.
