= Crispin Sorhaindo =

Dominican politician

- Crispin Sorhaindo

4th President of Dominica
- In office 25 October 1993 – 5 October 1998
- Prime Minister: Eugenia Charles; Edison James
- Preceded by: Clarence Seignoret
- Succeeded by: Vernon Shaw

Speaker of the House of Assembly of Dominica
- In office 16 September 1989 – 24 October 1993
- Prime Minister: Eugenia Charles
- Preceded by: Marie Davis Pierre
- Succeeded by: Neva Edwards

Personal details
- Born: 23 May 1931 Vieille Case
- Died: 10 January 2010 (aged 78)

Crispin Anselm Sorhaindo OBE (23 May 1931 – 10 January 2010) was the fourth President of Dominica. He served from 25 October 1993 until 5 October 1998.

== Early life ==
Sorhaindo was born in 1931 in the village of Vieille Case. He attended the Vieille Case Government School, where his father served as the principal, and subsequently attended the Dominica Grammar School. After some years in the public service, he was sent to study abroad at the Overseas Service Course at Trinity College, Oxford, in 1956 and 1957, as well as the Royal Institute of Public Administration in 1963 and 1964, where he undertook the Public Finance Course.

== Political career ==
From 1950 until 1973, Sorhaindo served in several public service posts including Clerk of the Executive and Legislative Councils, which preceded the establishment of the House of Assembly. He also served as the chief establishment officer, principal secretary, Ministry of Finance, and financial secretary.

In 1963, Sorhaindo served as the secretary of the Civil Service Commission on the Proposed East Caribbean Federation. There, he hoped to form a nation of "the little eight" that remained out of the collapsed West Indies Federation (1958–1962). In 1966, he served as a delegate to the London conference that designated Dominica as a self-governing Associated State of Britain until independence in 1978.

Sorhaindo was a committed regionalist and was instrumental in various occasions during Caribbean integration. He represented Dominica at the early conferences leading to the establishment of the Caribbean Free Trade Association (CARIFTA), the Caribbean Free Trade Area and CARICOM, the Caribbean Common Market that succeeded it, as well as meetings that laid the foundations for the establishment of the Caribbean Development Bank (CDB) and the Organisation of Eastern Caribbean States (OECS).

Sorhaindo worked with the Caribbean Development Bank based in Barbados from 1973 until 1988. He served in various capacities, including as bank secretary, director and vice-president during his time at the bank.

Upon his return to Dominica in 1988, he accepted the position of Speaker of the House of Assembly of Dominica. He served from 1989 until 1993, when he was elected as president. He served a single term which ended in 1998.

== Post-presidential career ==
Sorhaindo was a devout Roman Catholic and served the church in many capacities as a member, chairman and president of committees and boards such as the Social Centre, Help Age International and REACH. In recognition of these services he received the Papal award of Knight Commander of the Order of St. Sylvester in 1993. For service to the state, he was awarded the Order of the British Empire in 1969. He was also awarded the Venezuelan naval medal Almirante Luis Brion in 1998 and the Dominica Award of Honour in 2001.

== Death ==
Sorhaindo died on 10 January 2010 following a long battle with cancer. He was survived by his wife, the former Ruby Allport, and their six children.

Preceded by Clarence Seignoret	President of Dominica; 1993–98	Succeeded by Vernon Shaw
