= 2018 Liechtenstein Tour de Ski referendum =

Tour de Ski Referendum
- 25 November 2018
- Referendum on the Financing of the Tour de Ski

Results
Choice	Votes	%
Yes	5,543	40.69%
No	8,079	59.31%
Valid votes	13,622	99.35%
Invalid or blank votes	89	0.65%
Total votes	13,711	100.00%
Registered voters/turnout	20,088	68.25%
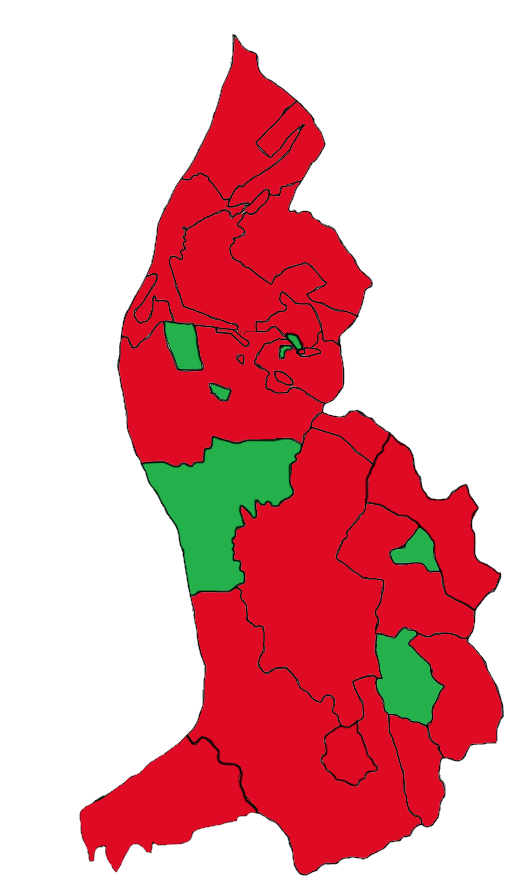
- Results by municipality

A referendum on the financing of the Tour de Ski was held in Liechtenstein on 25 November 2018. The proposal was rejected by 59% of voters.

== Background ==
On 25 September 2018 the Landtag voted by a margin of 14–11 to allocate two loans of 400,000CHF to the Liechtenstein Ski Association (LSV) to allow it to host the Tour de Ski in 2019–20 and 2020–21. The measure was opposed by The Independents, who began collecting signatures for a referendum on 13 September. Under article 66 of the constitution, a referendum can be held if at least 1,000 signatures are collected within a 30-day period. By 12 October, 1,743 signatures were collected, with 1,730 deemed valid.

On 16 October the government set a date for the referendum. In the meantime, the LSV was awarded the right to host the races on 28 September.

== Results ==
Choice	Votes	%
For	5,543	40.69
Against	8,079	59.31
Total	13,622	100.00
Valid votes	13,622	99.35
Invalid/blank votes	89	0.65
Total votes	13,711	100.00
Registered voters/turnout	20,088	68.25
Source: Government of Liechtenstein
