= 2018 in politics =

These are some of the notable events relating to politics in 2018.

== By region ==
=== Africa ===
- 8–9 July
  - 2018 Eritrea–Ethiopia summit - A bilateral summit where Eritrean President Isaias Afwerki and Ethiopian Prime Minister Abiy Ahmed signed a joint declaration on 9 July, formally ending the border conflict between both countries. The joint statement was considered to close all chapters regarding the Eritrean–Ethiopian War (1998–2000) and the following Eritrean–Ethiopian border conflict (2000–2018).

=== Asia ===
- 11 March
  - China's National People's Congress approves a constitutional change that removes term limits for the President and Vice President, allowing Xi Jinping to be re-elected to the post indefinite times. Xi is also the General Secretary of the Chinese Communist Party (paramount leader).
- 6 April
  - Former President of South Korea Park Geun-hye was found guilty for her conviction over a political scandal in 2016, after a year since her impeachment in March last year. She was sentenced to a 25-year imprisonment following retrials, though she served for three years before being released after a pardon by current President Moon Jae-in in December 2021.
- October
  - Prince MBS of Saudi Arabia sends a group of government agents to murder prominent critic, Jamal Khashoggi. His death is just a few days before his sixtieth birthday.

=== Europe ===
- 12 July
  - 2018 Brussels summit of the North Atlantic Treaty Organization (NATO) held in Brussels, Belgium, on 11 and 12 July 2018.NATO announces that a new Cyber Operations Command will be established to coordinate efforts to protect cyber-security.
- 25 October
  - After the monthly meeting of the ECB Governing Council, the ECB announces that it will not change benchmark interest rates. It also states that it plans to end quantitative easing by the end of 2018.
- 15 November
  - United Kingdom Brexit Secretary Dominic Raab resigns, as does Work and Pensions Secretary Esther McVey and several other ministers because of disagreement with terms of a draft Brexit deal announced on November 14, 2018.

=== North America ===
- 6 November
  - United States midterm elections, 2018

=== South America ===
- 20 May
  - 2018 Venezuelan presidential election
- 9 December
  - 2018 Venezuelan municipal elections

== By topic ==
=== General world affairs and international relations ===
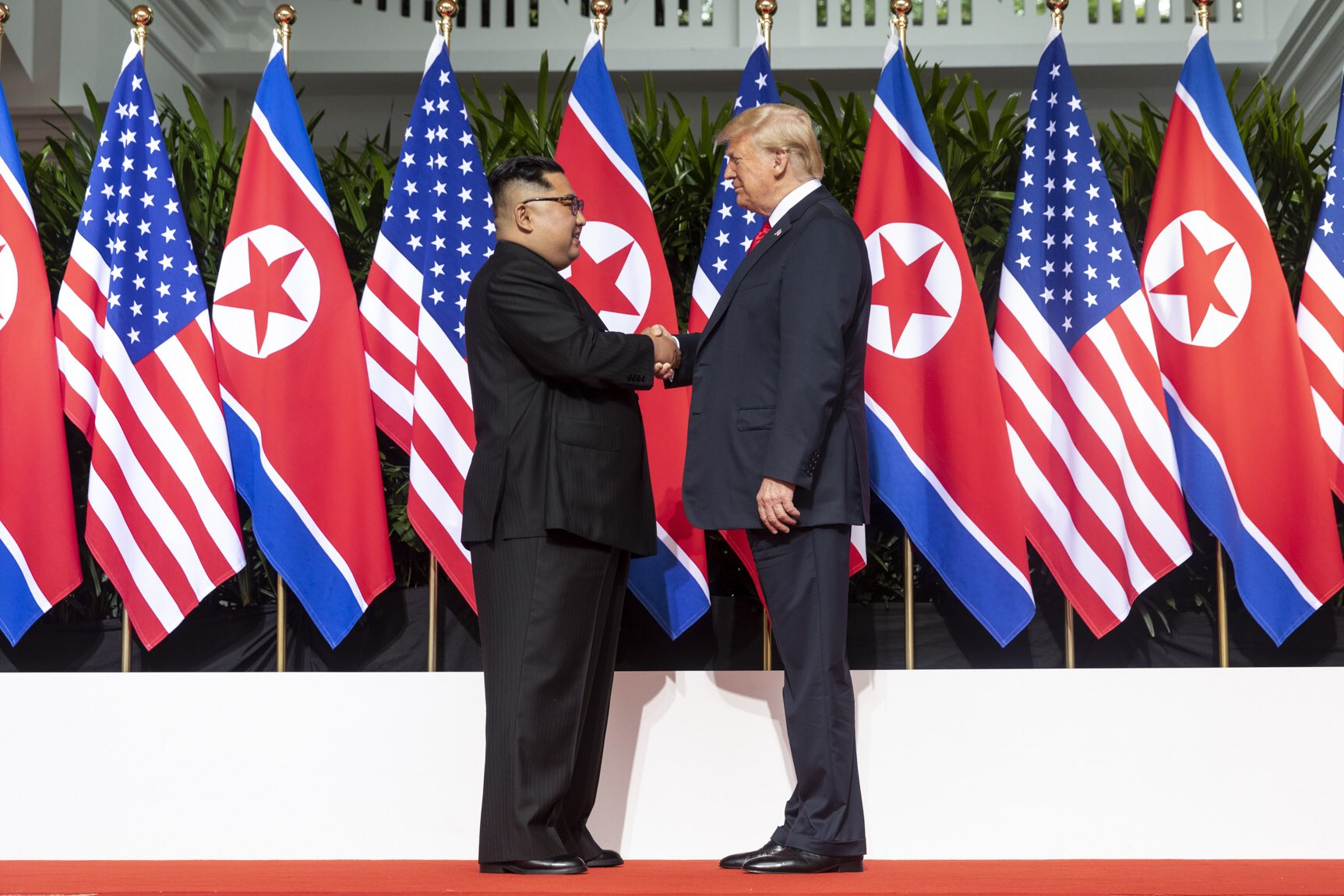
Leaders of North Korea and the United States met for the first time at the Singapore Summit

- 12 June
  - 2018 North Korea–United States Singapore Summit – North Korean Chairman Kim Jong Un and United States president Donald Trump convened a summit at the Capella Hotel in Sentosa, Singapore, marking their first such meeting between the two countries in history.
- 12 July
  - 2018 Brussels summit of the North Atlantic Treaty Organization (NATO) held in Brussels, Belgium, on 11 and 12 July 2018.NATO announces that a new Cyber Operations Command will be established to coordinate efforts to protect cyber-security.
- 15 November
  - United Kingdom Brexit Secretary Dominic Raab resigns, as does Work and Pensions Secretary Esther McVey and several other ministers because of disagreement with terms of a draft Brexit deal announced on November 14, 2018.

=== Politics ===
- 6 November
  - United States midterm elections, 2018

=== Economics and banking ===
- 25 October
  - After the monthly meeting of the ECB Governing Council, the ECB announces that it will not change benchmark interest rates. It also states that it plans to end quantitative easing by the end of 2018.
