= 2018 Swiss referendums =

National referendums held in Switzerland in 2018

Ten national referendums were held in Switzerland in 2018. Voting took place on 4 March, 10 June, 23 September and 25 November.

== March referendums ==
Results of the No Billag referendum by canton.

Two referendums were held on 4 March. One was on a Federal Decree on the new Financial Regulation 2021, which would extend the right of the federal government to levy VAT and direct federal tax until 2035. The other was the "Yes to the abolition of radio and television fees" popular initiative, which proposed abolishing the licence fee that provides the majority of funding for the Swiss Broadcasting Corporation.

The abolition proposal, known by the informal name No Billag, was rejected by the Federal Assembly in 2017. Proponents of the initiative argued it was not fair for everyone to pay the fee regardless of whether they consumed Swiss Broadcasting Corporation output or not, that the total yearly sum of 1.37 billion francs should be spent by consumers, and that the SRG SSR would become more politically independent if it did not depend on the mandatory fee. Opponents of the initiative claimed that removing the mandatory fee would threaten national cohesion and that the country would become a "media desert" which would be dangerous to Switzerland's system of direct democracy. A committee, "Nein zum Sendeschluss", was formed to oppose the initiative. Opponents received support from 6,000 artists who published an online statement "defending cultural diversity in Switzerland" and argued that cultural diversity would be threatened if the initiative passed. Polls suggested 65 percent would vote against the proposal.

The Federal Decree on the new Financial Regulation 2021 was approved by 84% of votes, while the No Billag initiative was rejected by 72% of voters.

=== Results ===
Question	For		Against		Invalid/ blank	Total votes	Registered voters	Turnout	Cantons for		Cantons against		Result
Question	Votes	%	Votes	%	Invalid/ blank	Total votes	Registered voters	Turnout	Full	Half	Full	Half	Result
Financial Regulation 2021	2,358,086	84.1	445,464	15.9	100,497	2,904,047	5,391,090	53.87	20	6	0	0	Approved
Abolition of Radio and Television Fees	833,837	28.4	2,098,302	71.6	24,215	2,956,354	5,391,090	54.84	0	0	20	6	Rejected
Source: Federal Chancellery of Switzerland 1, 2

== June referendums ==
Two referendums were held on 10 June; one on the Sovereign Money Initiative proposal and one on the Federal Gambling Act.

The Sovereign Money Initiative proposal aims to give the Swiss National Bank a monopoly on money creation. It was launched by the Monetary Modernisation Association, without the support of any political party. The collection of signatures began on 3 June 2014, and the initiative was submitted to the Federal Chancellery on 1 December 2015 with over 110,000 valid signatures, despite its technical subject and without the support of political parties or other civil society organizations. The Federal Assembly recommended rejecting the initiative.

=== Results ===
Question	For		Against		Invalid/ blank	Total votes	Registered voters	Turnout %	Cantons for		Cantons against		Result
Question	Votes	%	Votes	%	Invalid/ blank	Total votes	Registered voters	Turnout %	Full	Half	Full	Half	Result
Sovereign Money Initiative	442,387	24.3	1,379,540	75.7	44,042	1,865,969	5,400,197	34.6	0	0	20	6	Rejected
Federal Gambling Act	1,326,207	72.9	492,024	27.1	45,723	1,863,954	5,400,197	34.5					Approved
Source: Federal Chancellery of Switzerland 1, 2

== September referendums ==
Three referendums were held on 23 September. The first was aimed at requiring the federal government to consider cycle paths in the same way as footpaths and hiking trails, the second would require the government to promote environmentally sound, animal-friendly and fairly produced foodstuffs, and the third to focus agriculture policy on small, family farms and to promote sustainable, diverse and gene-technology-free agriculture. The cycle paths initiative was approved, whilst the food and agriculture ones were rejected.

=== Results ===
Question	For		Against		Invalid/ blank	Total votes	Registered voters	Turnout %	Cantons for		Cantons against		Result
Question	Votes	%	Votes	%	Invalid/ blank	Total votes	Registered voters	Turnout %	Full	Half	Full	Half	Result
Cycle Initiative	1,475,000	73.6	529,253	26.4	24,603	2,028,856	5,412,449	37.5	20	6	0	0	Approved
Fair Food Initiative	774,821	38.7	1,227,326	61.3	28,699	2,030,846	5,412,449	37.5	4	0	16	6	Rejected
Agricultural Policy	628,301	31.6	1,358,894	68.4	40,803	2,027,998	5,412,449	37.5	4	0	16	6	Rejected
Source: Federal Chancellery of Switzerland 1, 2, 3

== November referendums ==
Three referendums were held on 25 November. The first proposal aimed to subsidise farmers who did not dehorn their livestock. The second proposal would have explicitly given the Swiss Federal Constitution precedence over international law whenever the two contradict. The third initiative would allow insurance companies to hire their own detectives to spy on individuals suspected of abusing social welfare privileges.

=== Results ===
Question	For		Against		Invalid/ blank	Total votes	Registered voters	Turnout %	Cantons for		Cantons against		Result
Question	Votes	%	Votes	%	Invalid/ blank	Total votes	Registered voters	Turnout %	Full	Half	Full	Half	Result
Subsidising farmers not dehorning their livestock	1,144,845	45.3	1,384,027	54.7	89,375	2,618,247	5,420,789	48.3	4	2	16	4	Rejected
Giving the Swiss constitution precedence over international law	872,288	33.7	1,713,501	66.3	38,347	2,624,136	5,420,789	48.4	0	0	20	6	Rejected
Allowing insurance companies to use private detectives	1,667,849	64.7	909,172	35.3	45,370	2,622,391	5,420,789	48.4					Approved
Source: Federal Chancellery of Switzerland 1, 2, 3
