= Vernon Shaw =

President of Dominica

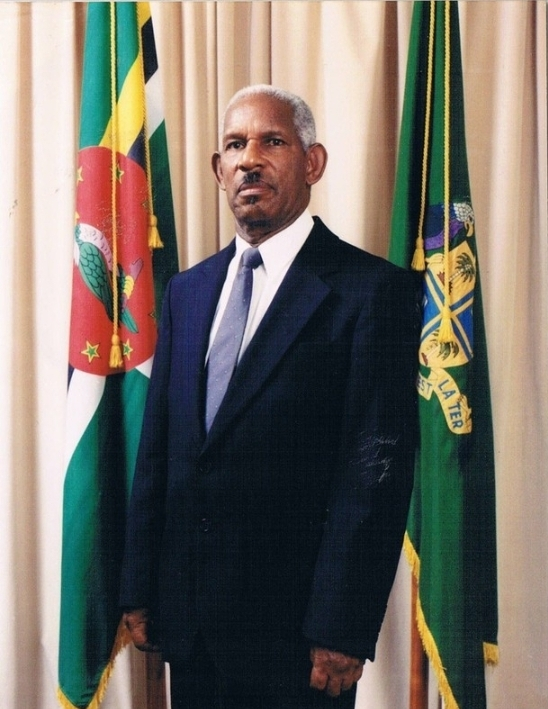

5th President of Dominica
- In office 6 October 1998 – 1 October 2003
- Prime Minister: Edison James; Rosie Douglas; Pierre Charles
- Preceded by: Crispin Sorhaindo
- Succeeded by: Nicholas Liverpool

Personal details
- Born: Vernon Lorden Shaw; 13 May 1930
- Died: 2 December 2013 (aged 83)

Vernon Lorden Shaw (13 May 1930 – 2 December 2013) was the fifth President of Dominica, in office from 1998 to 2003.

Shaw was an alumnus of the Dominica Grammar School and Trinity College, Oxford. He was a career civil servant, rising to the post of Cabinet Secretary in 1977, and retiring in 1990. He became resident tutor of the University of the West Indies in 1991.

Shaw was elected to a five-year term as president by the House of Assembly on 2 October 1998, as the candidate of the United Workers' Party (UWP). The secret ballot, party-line vote was 18–13. He took office on October 6, 1998, following the expiration of President Crispin Sorhaindo's single five-year term. Shaw left office on 1 October 2003, and was succeeded by Nicholas Liverpool. He died on 2 December 2013 at the age of 83.

Preceded by Crispin Sorhaindo	President of Dominica; 1998–2003	Succeeded by Nicholas Liverpool
