= 2018 Colombian anti-corruption referendum =

26 August 2018
- Outcome: Failed due insufficient voter turnout

1. Introducing term limits
For	99.03%
Against	0.97%

2. Disclosure of assets
For	99.45%
Against	0.55%

3. Disclosure of activities and interests
For	99.61%
Against	0.39%

4. Public hearings on budgets
For	99.13%
Against	0.87%

5. Public contracts being put out to tender
For	99.42%
Against	0.58%

6. Removal of parole for corruption convictions
For	99.57%
Against	0.43%

7. Reduction in maximum salary for public officials
For	99.17%
Against	0.83%

A referendum on anti-corruption measures was held in Colombia on 26 August 2018. Voters were asked whether they approve of seven proposals aimed at reducing corruption: limiting the number of terms for politicians at all levels to three; requiring election candidates disclose their assets and those of their relatives; elected politicians being required to disclose their activities and private interests; a requirement for public hearings on budgets; a requirement for all public sector contracts to go out to tender; the removal of the right to parole for people convicted of corruption; and reducing the maximum salary of public officials and politicians from forty times the minimum wage to twenty-five times.

In order for the results to be legally binding, voter turnout was required to be at least one-third of registered voters (12.1 million). However, only 11.7 million voters (32%) cast ballots.

== Background ==
The referendum was the result of a campaign called Consulta Popular Anticorrupción by senators Claudia López Hernández and Angélica Lozano Correa of the Green Alliance party. Under the constitution, a referendum can be called if 5% of registered voters sign a petition in favour. Between 24 January and 26 July 2017 a total of 4,236,682 signatures were collected, with 3,092,238 recognised as valid by the National Civil Registry, above the 5% threshold (1,762,083). The Senate approved the referendum on 5 June 2018 by a vote of 84–0, with President Juan Manuel Santos signing decree 1028/2018 on 18 June for the holding of the referendum.

== Campaign ==
Many politicians supported "Yes" in the referendum, and a parody music video in the style of reggaeton was widely shared on the country's social media before the vote, using clips of these politicians. The President, Iván Duque, supported the referendum, though his mentor Alvaro Uribe did not, saying he would prefer to discuss anti-corruption measures in Congress. At the time of the referendum, Uribe was one of several Colombian politicians under investigation for alleged corruption. Additionally, six of the seven proposals had previously been introduced in Congress, and had all been voted down. On August 9, 2018, Duque introduced several packets to Congress, including three which covered areas of the vote. The Democratic Centre party, of which the President is a representative, did not actively campaign for votes before the referendum.

== Results ==
Of the 11.7 million votes cast, 99% supported the amendments. However, the referendum came 470,000 votes short of the required 12.1 million votes, resulting in the vote being disqualified due to not reaching quorum.

Question	For		Against		Invalid/ blank	Total votes	Registered voters	Turnout	Result
Question	Votes	%	Votes	%	Invalid/ blank	Total votes	Registered voters	Turnout	Result
Introducing term limits	11,300,109	99.03	110,921	0.97	263,921	11,674,951	36,421,026	32.06	Quorum not reached
Disclosure of assets	11,443,463	99.45	63,168	0.55	168,320	11,674,951	36,421,026	32.06	Quorum not reached
Disclosure of activities and interests	11,477,612	99.61	45,387	0.39	151,952	11,674,951	36,421,026	32.06	Quorum not reached
Public hearings on budgets	11,413,090	99.13	99,846	0.87	162,015	11,674,951	36,421,026	32.06	Quorum not reached
Public contracts being put out to tender	11,448,715	99.42	66,555	0.58	159,681	11,674,951	36,421,026	32.06	Quorum not reached
Removal of parole for corruption convictions	11,482,949	99.57	49,334	0.43	142,668	11,674,951	36,421,026	32.06	Quorum not reached
Reduction in maximum salary for public officials	11,437,502	99.17	95,588	0.83	141,861	11,674,951	36,421,026	32.06	Quorum not reached
Source: CNE
