= Referendums in the Netherlands =

In the Netherlands, seven national referendums have been held between 1797 and 2018. Since 2018, there is no longer a legal basis for referendums.

The first four referendums were held during the Batavian Republic and focused on the establishment of a new constitution. In the 200 years that followed, there was no legal framework for referendums, and they did not take place at a national level. In 1999, a constitutional amendment aimed at introducing a binding referendum failed during the Night of Wiegel. Between 2002 and 2005, the Temporary Referendum Act was introduced as a compromise, allowing consultative referendums to be held, but no referendums were conducted under this law. In 2005, however, a referendum was held on the European Constitution, based on a special law created for that purpose.

From 2015 to 2018, there was the Advisory Referendum Act, under which two non-binding referendums were held. Since 2022, a constitutional amendment has been under consideration that aims to make binding referendums possible.

== Batavian Republic (1796-1806) ==
=== 1797 constitutional referendum ===
After the Batavian Revolution in 1795, the States General of the Batavian Republic came to agreement to create a regulation for a National Assembly. The primary task of the National Assembly would be to create a new constitution. The regulation included an article which required a referendum on the constitution. The referendum was held on 8 August 1797 and resulted in a 79.55% opposing the proposed constitution.

=== 1798 constitutional referendum ===
As a result of the constitutions rejection, the second term of the National Assembly had to create a new constitution. At first, the National Assembly was bound by the same regulation which required a referendum. In 1798 however, a coup d'état by more unitarist representatives took place. They dropped the regulation, however they issued a decree saying they would nevertheless hold a referendum. The referendum on the new proposal was held on 23 April 1798, in which a majority of 92.99 voted in favor of adopting the Constitution for the Batavian People. Only those who swore allegiance to the coup were allowed to vote.

== Temporary Referendum Act (2002-2005) ==
The first Kok cabinet, composed of the Labour Party (Netherlands), People's Party for Freedom and Democracy (VVD), and Democrats 66 (D66), agreed to introduce binding referendums into the constitution. The law passed the first reading before the 1998 general election and the second reading in the House of Representatives. However, during the second reading in the Senate, the law failed to secure the required two-thirds majority, in what came to be known as the Night of Wiegel.

Following the rejection of the law, a cabinet crisis ensued. To resolve the issue, a compromise was reached: the cabinet would introduce a temporary law for non-binding referendums, which would not require a constitutional amendment and thus avoid the need for a two-thirds majority. The law came into effect in 2002. However, the law had high thresholds: an initial request needed 40,000 signatures, followed by the collection of 600,000 signatures within six weeks, with supporters required to personally register at the town hall. As a result, no referendums were held under this law before it ended.

== Dutch European Constitution referendum (2005) ==
A special law was created to organise a referendum on the Treaty establishing a Constitution for Europe. The referendum was held on 1 June 2005. A 61.54% majority voted against the treaty, with a turnout of 63.3%. The outcome led to an end to the ratification of the Treaty. The Treaty was later replaced by the Treaty of Lisbon.

== Advisory Referendum Act (2015-2018) ==
In 2005, members of the Labour Party (PvdA), GreenLeft (GL) and Democrats 66 (D66) introduced the bill that would become the Advisory Referendum Act (Dutch: Wet raadgevend referendum). The bill passed the House of Representatives on 14 February 2013 with 98 votes in favour and 52 against. All parties except the coalition party People's Party for Freedom and Democracy and the three Christian parties – Christian Democratic Appeal, ChristianUnion and the Reformed Political Party – voted in favour. In the Senate, the opposing votes came from the same four parties and the bill passed with 45 votes in favour and 30 against. It was signed into law on 30 September 2014 and entered into force on 1 July 2015.

List of referendum initiatives with at least 50 requests
Act/Treaty	Year	Preliminary requests	Definite requests
EU-Ukraine Association Agreement	2015	13,480	429,939
EU-Moldova Association Agreement	2015	100	-
EU-Georgia Association Agreement	2015	98	-
Denunciation of the Dutch-Moroccan Social Security Treaty	2016	1,971	-
Intelligence and Security Services Act 2017	2017	17,162	384,126
Phasing out of the Hillen Act	2018	24,822	11,306
Amendment to the Organ Donation Act	2018	41,887	146,636

The request procedure of a referendum consisted of two stages. For the preliminary request, 10,000 requests had to be received within four weeks after proclamation of the law. Upon completion of this stage, the provisions concerning entry into force of the law in question were suspended until the procedure has come to an end. For the definitive request, 300,000 requests had to be received within six weeks after the completion of the preliminary request. If this was not successful, the 30% turnout had not been met or the law is approved, then the law could enter into effect by royal decree. If the law was rejected, then the suspension is indefinite and a follow-up law must be enacted that either repeals the law or overrides the suspended provisions to let the law enter into force after all.

=== 2016 Dutch Ukraine–European Union Association Agreement referendum ===
The first referendum held based on the Consultative Referendum Act concerned the approval act of the Association Agreement between the European Union and Ukraine and was held in on 6 April 2016. The referendum question was: "Are you for or against the Approval Act of the Association Agreement between the European Union and Ukraine?"

With a turnout of 32.28%, the threshold for a valid referendum was met. 61% of the votes cast were against the Approval Act. Following the vote, the government secured an additional agreement between the 28 Member States of the European Union addressing what were according to the government the concerns of the no-vote in December 2017. The additional agreement did not change the association agreement and neither Ukraine nor the European Union or Euratom were parties to the additional agreement. Following the approval of the additional agreement, a new law was passed approving the Association Agreement in May 2017.

=== Repeal ===
During the 2017 cabinet formation, the negotiating parties decided to repeal the Advisory Referendum Act. This was completed in 2018.

== Attempted constitutional amendments (2000-) ==
After the Night of Wiegel, several constitutional amendments were proposed. The second Kok cabinet reintroduced the same proposal after the Night of Wiegel, which was accepted in the first reading. However, it was rejected in the second reading on 29 June 2004. In 2005, members of parliament from GL, PvdA, and later D66 also submitted a proposal, which was accepted in the first reading. In the second reading, it was adopted by the Socialist Party (SP) and rejected in 2017, with GroenLinks, PvdA, and D66 voting against it.

Following the recommendations of the State Commission on the Parliamentary System, the SP again proposed a constitutional amendment. This was accepted in the first reading but was rejected in the second reading by the House of Representatives in 2022.

Because the stumbling block in the last review was the number of required endorsements and the necessary turnout percentage, the SP decided to resubmit the proposal without regulating it in the constitution. The proposal leaves this to a regular law, which must still secure a two-thirds majority but does not require two readings. In January 2025, the House of Representatives approved the proposal in the second reading, and it is now awaiting the final steps in the Senate.

== Local referendums ==
Referendums can be organized on the local level. The municipality of Amsterdam has a non-binding "corrective referendum", held after a decision had been made. It has been used for issues such as the formation of a city province and the construction of the North/South Line of the Amsterdam Metro and the neighborhood of IJburg.
