= Clarence Seignoret =

President of Dominica

Sir Clarence Seignoret GCB OBE

3rd President of Dominica
- In office 19 December 1983 – 25 October 1993
- Prime Minister: Eugenia Charles
- Preceded by: Aurelius Marie
- Succeeded by: Crispin Sorhaindo

Personal details
- Born: 25 February 1919 Roseau, British Dominica
- Died: 5 May 2002 (aged 83) Roseau, Dominica
- Spouse: Judith Laronde (m. 1950)
- Children: 2
- Education: Oxford University

Sir Clarence Henry Augustus Seignoret GCB OBE (25 February 1919 – 5 May 2002) was the third President of Dominica.

== Early life & education ==
Born in Roseau, to Violet (née Riviere) and Clarence A. Seignoret. Seignoret was educated at the Dominica Grammar School and at college in Saint Lucia.

== Career ==
He started working as a civil servant in Dominica from 1936. From 1958 to 1960 he undertook an international public service course in Oxford University. On returning to Dominica he resumed his governmental career, acting on various occasions as first Secretary to the Cabinet and substitute to the President.

The House of Assembly of Dominica elected him as President of Dominica in 1983, and he was sworn in during October of that year. Re-elected to the presidency in 1988, he resigned in 1993.

In the 1966 New Year Honours, Queen Elizabeth II appointed him an Officer of the Order of the British Empire (OBE) and in 1985 he was knighted with the Grand Cross of the Order of the Bath. He was also Knight of Malta since 1992.

== Personal life ==
In 1950 he married Judith Laronde, together they had 2 sons.

Preceded by Aurelius Marie	President of Dominica; 1983–93	Succeeded by Crispin Sorhaindo
