= Fred Degazon =

Dominican politician

His Excellency Frederick Degazon

President of Dominica
- In office 16 January 1979 – 29 January 1980
- Prime Minister: Patrick John; Oliver Seraphin
- Preceded by: Sir Louis Cools-Lartigue (acting)
- Succeeded by: Sir Louis Cools-Lartigue (acting)

Speaker of the House of Assembly of Dominica
- In office March 1977 – December 1978
- Premier: Patrick John
- Preceded by: Eustace Hazelwood Francis
- Succeeded by: Pershing Waldron

Personal details
- Born: Frederick Eutrope Degazon; 4 January 1913 Castries, Saint Lucia
- Died: 4 October 2008 (aged 95) Greater London, England
- Education: University of London

Frederick Eutrope Degazon (4 January 1913 – 4 October 2008) was a Dominican politician who served as the first President of the country from 1979 to 1980.

== Biography ==
He was born in Castries, Saint Lucia on 4 January 1913.

Degazon went to college in Saint Lucia and studied law in the University of London. He practised law privately in Saint Lucia and Dominica from 1934 to 1940. In the 1940s he served as a civil servant in Dominica, Saint Lucia and Jamaica until his retirement in 1969. He was elected Speaker of the House of Assembly in 1977 and after declaration of independence in 1978, parliament elected Degazon as first President of Dominica, the post is largely ceremonial.

In June 1979, during a constitutional crisis stirred by the desire for democratic socialist reforms, Degazon tried to leave the country and was eventually allowed to flee to England on 11 June. The House of Assembly initially elected as his replacement Louis Cools-Lartigue, who resigned the next day, and he was then replaced by Jenner Armour. Degazon officially resigned in February 1980. He resided in London until his death there on 4 October 2008, at the age of 95.

Preceded by Sir Louis Cools-Lartigue (acting)	President of Dominica; 1979–1980	Succeeded by Sir Louis Cools-Lartigue (acting)
