= Speaker of the House of Assembly of Dominica =

The Speaker of the House of Assembly of Dominica is responsible for the management and general administration of the House, ensuring that rules of procedure are followed. The Speaker is elected by the House of Assembly at its first sitting after a general election.

A member of the House who is elected as Speaker can only vote to break ties (a casting vote). If someone outside the membership of the House is elected as Speaker, they become a member, but cannot cast an original or casting vote.

Louis Cools-Lartigue, OBE, was the speaker of its predecessor, the Legislative Council until 1967.

== Presidents of the Legislative Council ==
Name	Took office	Left office	Notes
Edwin Porter Arrowsmith	1951	1952	
Henry Laurence Lindo	1952	1959	
Alec Lovelace	1960	1961	

== Speakers of the Legislative Council ==
Name	Took office	Left office	Notes
Louis Cools-Lartigue	February 1961	1965 - ?	
Louis Cools-Lartigue	January 1967	March 1967	

== Speakers of the House of Assembly ==
Name	Took office	Left office	Notes
Louis Cools-Lartigue	March 1967	1968	
Gerald Austin Winston	1968	1970	
Eustace Hazelwood Francis	October 1970	March 1977	
Fred Degazon	March 1977	December 1978	
Pershing Waldron	4 January 1979	19 June 1979	
Eden Bowers	19 June 1979	August 1980	
Marie Davis Pierre	13 August 1980	29 December 1988	
Crispin Sorhaindo	16 September 1989	24 October 1993	
Neva Edwards	1 November 1993	2 August 1995	
F. Osborne G. Symes	3 August 1995	16 April 2000	
Alix Boyd Knights	17 April 2000	10 February 2020	
Joseph Isaac	10 February 2020	Incumbent	
