= 2018 Dutch Intelligence and Security Services Act referendum =

- 21 March 2018
- Are you for or against the Intelligence and Security Services Act 2017?
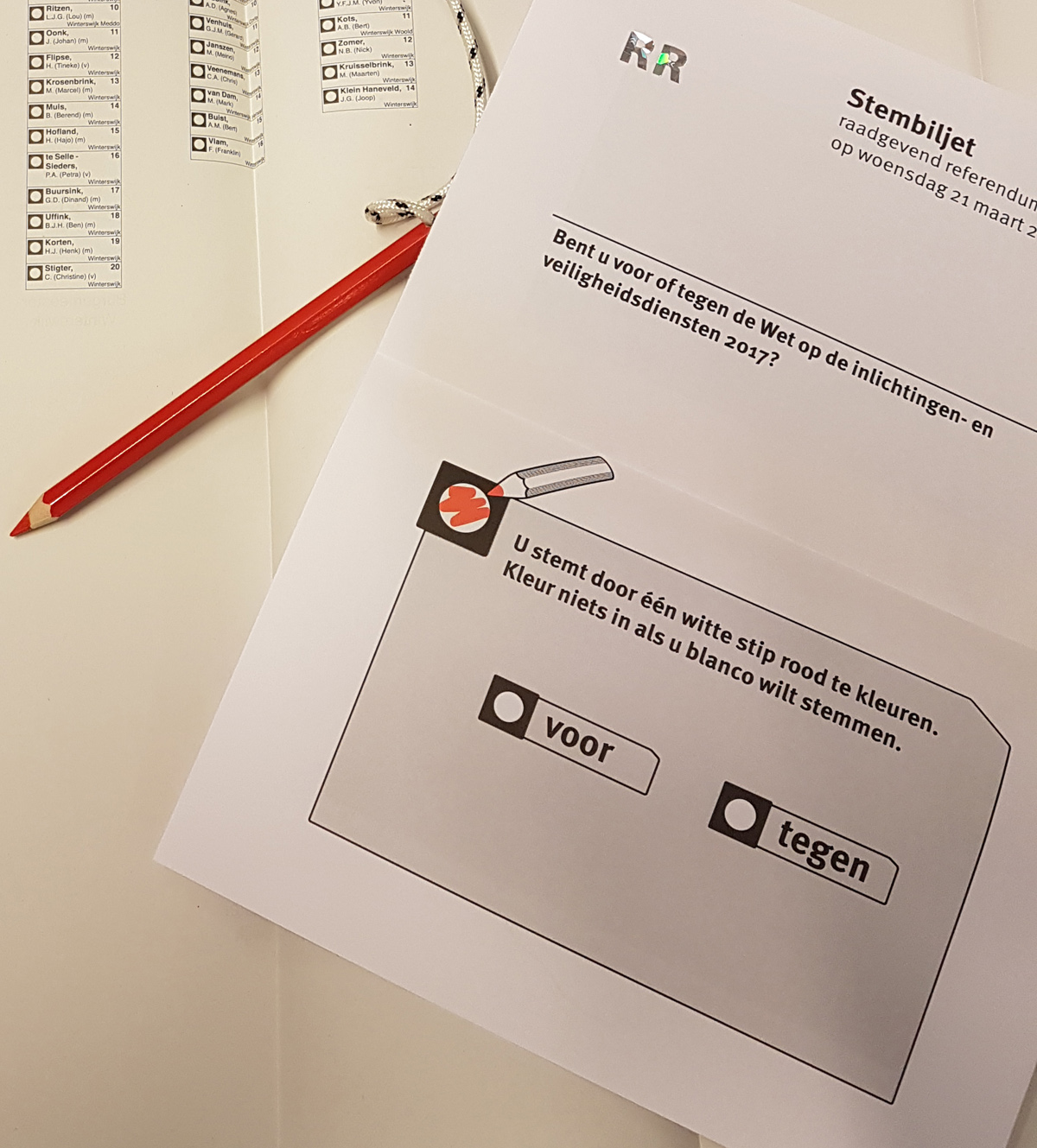

Results
Choice	Votes	%
For	3,122,628	46.53%
Against	3,317,496	49.44%
Blank votes	270,288	4.03%
Valid votes	6,710,412	99.65%
Invalid votes	23,813	0.35%
Total votes	6,734,225	100.00%
Eligible to vote/turnout	13,064,932	51.54%
- Results by municipality For Against

An advisory referendum on the Intelligence and Security Services Act 2017 (Dutch: Wet op de inlichtingen- en veiligheidsdiensten 2017, abbreviated 'Wiv') was held in the Netherlands on 21 March 2018, alongside the municipal elections. It was the second referendum to be held under the Dutch Advisory Referendum Act after the 2016 Ukraine–European Union Association Agreement referendum.

A plurality of voters (49.44%) voted against the law, resulting in its rejection. Voter turnout was 51.5%, above the 30% threshold for validation of the result. As with the previous referendum, the referendum created a no-show paradox, where the 46.5% of voters who turned out to vote for the bill instead causing its rejection, by helping the referendum meet the quota. If voters who cast for ballots had instead refused to show up, the turnout of 27.5% would have been insufficient for the result to be declared valid.

Although the referendum itself was non-binding, Prime Minister Mark Rutte had promised to take a potential "no" vote into account prior to the referendum.

== Background ==
The draft Intelligence and Security Agencies Act 2017 was laid before the States General by the Government of the Netherlands at the end of 2016. On 14 February 2017, a majority in the House of Representatives voted in support of the act, which was then approved in the Senate on 11 July.

== Request ==
Stage	Required	Received	Valid
Preliminary requests	10,000	19,266	17,162
Definitive requests	300,000	417,354	384,126

A campaign to obtain sufficient support declarations for a referendum was initiated by a group of students at the University of Amsterdam concerned about the sweeping surveillance powers granted to the General Intelligence and Security Service (AIVD) under the law. On 1 November 2017, the Electoral Council (Dutch: Kiesraad) announced that a sufficient number of signatures had been collected to trigger an advisory referendum on the tapping law, with 384,126 valid signatures, over 92 percent of those collected, well above the 300,000 required for a referendum.

== Party positions ==
The referendum comes after the formation of the Third Rutte cabinet following the 2017 general election, with the coalition divided whether to hold a referendum on the law, Democrats 66 (D66) being the only one of the four coalition parties that voted against disregarding the result ahead of the referendum.

The party positions listed below are based on the vote of the law in the House of Representatives on 14 February 2017, with the exception of Forum for Democracy (FvD), which was not represented in the lower chamber before the 2017 general election.

Party	Seats	Position
People's Party for Freedom and Democracy	33 / 150	For
Party for Freedom	20 / 150	For (Note: PVV announced that even though they voted in favor, they would respect the outcome of the referendum.)
Christian Democratic Appeal	19 / 150	For
Democrats 66	19 / 150	For
GreenLeft	14 / 150	Against
Socialist Party	14 / 150	Against
Labour Party	9 / 150	For
Christian Union	5 / 150	For
Party for the Animals	5 / 150	Against
50PLUS	4 / 150	For
Reformed Political Party	3 / 150	For
Denk	3 / 150	Against
Forum for Democracy	2 / 150	Against

== Opinion polls ==
=== Vote in referendum ===
Polling firm	Date	For	Against	Don't know	Will not vote	Lead
Ipsos	20 Mar 2018	53	34	13	–	19
I&O Research	12 Mar 2018	51	30	19	–	21
Peil.nl	11 Mar 2018	45	42	13	–	3
Kantar Public	4 Mar 2018	35	24	26	15	10
Ipsos	26 Feb 2018	48	32	20	–	16
I&O Research	6 Feb 2018	42	28	30	–	14
Kantar Public	28 Jan 2018	32	22	30	16	10
Peil.nl	3 Dec 2017	40	60	–	–	20
I&O Research	30 Oct 2017	52	32	17	–	20
I&O Research	9 Oct 2017	50	30	20	–	20
I&O Research	11 Sep 2017	60	24	17	–	36

=== Support for the law ===
Polling firm	Date	For	Against	Don't know	Lead
GfK	31 Oct 2017	34	53	13	19
GfK	23 Oct 2017	40	49	11	9

== Results ==
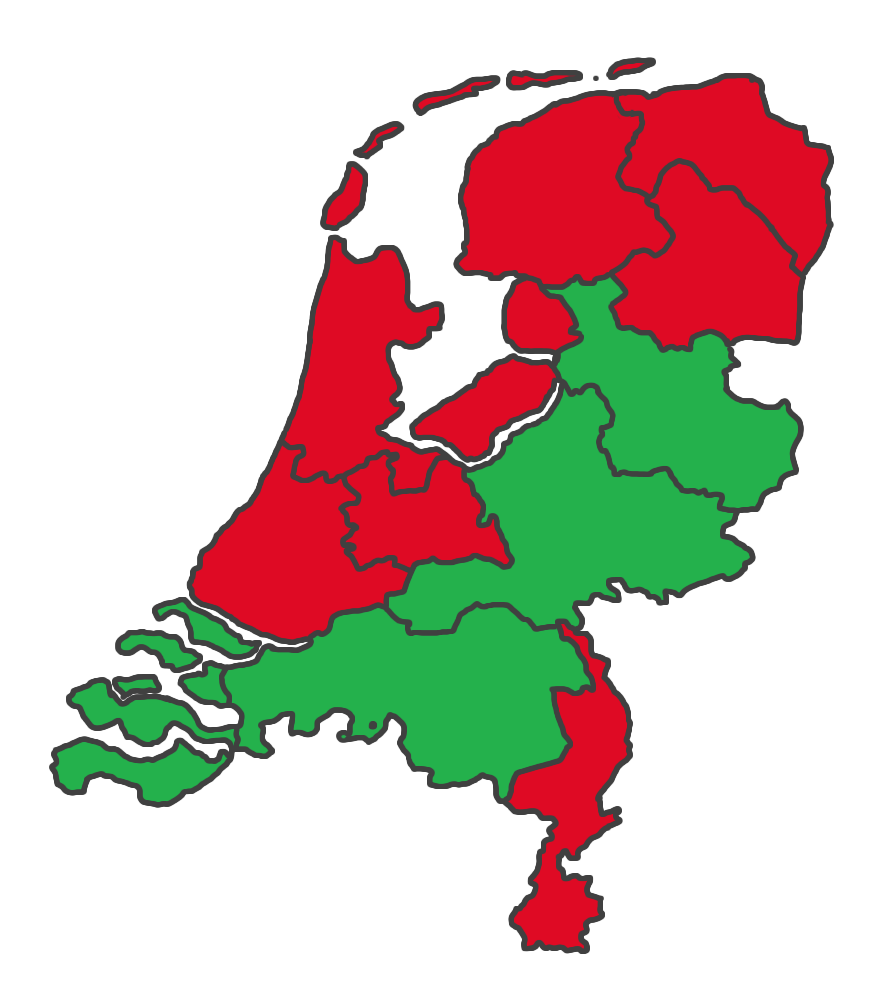
Results by province

Choice	Votes	%
For	3,122,628	46.53
Against	3,317,496	49.44
Blank	270,288	4.03
Total	6,710,412	100.00
Valid votes	6,710,412	99.65
Invalid votes	23,813	0.35
Total votes	6,734,225	100.00
Registered voters/turnout	13,064,932	51.54
Source: Kiesraad

=== Results by province or territory ===
Province or territory	Electorate	Voter turnout	In favour		Against		Blank	
Province or territory	Electorate	Voter turnout	Votes	%	Votes	%	Votes	%
Drenthe	387,611	54.16	99,787	47.72	100,850	48.23	8,472	4.05
Flevoland	297,206	50.28	67,377	45.24	77,168	51.81	4,390	2.95
Friesland	504,855	42.80	97,594	45.30	111,049	51.55	6,779	3.15
Gelderland	1,602,016	54.19	415,207	48.01	411,924	47.63	37,737	4.36
Groningen	458,131	37.22	61,200	35.97	105,009	61.72	3,916	2.30
Limburg	873,201	50.23	206,901	47.33	209,891	48.02	20,310	4.65
North Brabant	1,947,973	48.43	469,115	49.90	430,932	45.84	40,032	4.26
North Holland	2,075,436	52.87	453,840	41.51	598,606	54.75	40,927	3.74
Overijssel	882,344	56.92	247,309	49.41	230,930	46.14	22,311	4.46
Utrecht	969,421	57.65	253,208	45.46	278,935	50.08	24,863	4.46
Zeeland	291,514	56.70	88,950	54.02	69,174	42.01	6,536	3.97
South Holland	2,760,065	51.22	661,822	47.00	692,443	49.17	54,009	3.84
Caribbean Netherlands	15,159	6.06	318	34.98	585	64.36	6	0.66
Source: Kiesraad
