= Eliud Williams =

President of Dominica

7th President of Dominica
- In office 17 September 2012 – 2 October 2013
- Prime Minister: Roosevelt Skerrit
- Preceded by: Nicholas Liverpool
- Succeeded by: Charles Savarin

Personal details
- Born: 21 August 1948 (age 78)
- Party: Dominica Labour Party
- Education: University of the West Indies

Eliud Thaddeus Williams (born 21 August 1948) is a Dominican politician who served as seventh President of Dominica from 2012 to 2013.

== Life and career ==
Eliud Williams was born in 1948 in Dominica. After college he entered politics.

He was appointed as Commissioner of Cooperatives from 1985 to 1987. He entered the civil service and had several positions. He obtained a master's degree in Business Administration at the University of the West Indies in 1995.

He was Permanent Secretary to the Ministry of Health and Social Security from 1992 to 1996, then to the Ministry of Agriculture and the Environment until 2000. In the civil service, he was chairman of the government's Rural Enterprise project from 1996 to 2000.

In 2004, he became Director General of the Eastern Caribbean Telecommunications Authority, a position which he held until 2008. Next he went to the Ministry of Communications, Works and Housing til 2008. From 2004 to 2008, he was a senior consultant to WHITCO Inc, working in business planning.

Following the resignation of President Nicholas Liverpool due to ill health and later death, Eliud Williams was the Dominica Labour Party's candidate for the presidency. He was elected by Parliament on 18 September 2012, in an election boycotted by the main opposition United Workers Party, which claimed the process was unconstitutional.

Eliud has a brother Signorette Joseph Williams, who migrated to St. Croix USVI in the late 1960s before moving to the United States in 1980.

Political offices
Preceded by Nicholas Liverpool	President of Dominica; 2012–2013	Succeeded by Charles Savarin
