= Louis Cools-Lartigue =

Dominican politician

Sir Louis Cools-Lartigue OBE

Acting President of Dominica
- In office 15 June 1979 – 16 June 1979

President of Dominica (acting)
- In office 3 November 1978 – 16 January 1979
- Prime Minister: Patrick Roland John
- Succeeded by: Fred Degazon

Speaker of the House of Assembly of Dominica
- In office March 1967 – 1968
- Premier: Edward Oliver LeBlanc
- Preceded by: Himself as speaker of the Legislative Council
- Succeeded by: George Austin Winston

Personal details
- Born: Louis Cools-Lartigue; 18 January 1905
- Died: 21 August 1993 (aged 88)

Sir Louis Cools-Lartigue, OBE (18 January 1905 – 21 August 1993) was a Dominican politician.

== Biography ==
Until 1955, Cools-Lartigue was the Chief Secretary of the Windward Islands, when on 9 May, he was issued a Commission by George F. Holsten appointing him to the position of Governor's Deputy.

From November 1967 to 3 November 1978, Cools-Lartigue was the last Governor of Dominica. He was then elected Interim President and served as such from 3 November 1978 to 19 January 1979, until Fred Degazon was elected President of Dominica. During a constitutional crisis stirred by the desire for democratic socialist reforms, Degazon fled to England on 10 June 1979 and Cools-Lartigue was elected by the House of Assembly as his interim replacement on 15 June 1979. Cools-Lartigue resigned as President either the following day under family pressure, or due to rioters attacking his house on 17 June 1979. He was replaced as President of Dominica by Jenner Armour.

Preceded by Himself as last Governor of Dominica	President of Dominica; 1978 - 1979	Succeeded by Fred Degazon
