= Coat of arms of Dominica =

National symbol

- Armiger: Commonwealth of Dominica
- Adopted: 1961
- Crest: A Rocky Mount Sable thereon a Lion Passant guardant Or
- Torse: Argent and Azure
- Shield: Quarterly Or and Azure a cross fillet counterchanged in the first quarter on a Rocky Mount Sable a Coconut Tree fructed proper in the second a Dominica Crapaud also proper in the third on Water Barry wavy in base a Carib canoe with sail set all likewise proper in the fourth quarter on a Rocky Mount also sable a Banana Tree fructed also proper
- Supporters: On either side of Sisserou Parrot (Amazona imperials) proper beaked and membered or
- Motto: Apres Bondie C'est La Ter (Kwéyòl: After God, it is the earth.)
- Earlier version
- Use: 1909–1961

The coat of arms of Dominica was adopted on July 21, 1961. It consists of a shield with two guardian sisserou parrots bracing the shield atop of which is a lion passant. The quarters of the shield depict a canoe, a banana tree, a palm and a frog of the native species known as the mountain chicken. Below the shield is the national motto: Apres Bondie C'est La Ter (After God is the Earth).

== Official description ==
The government of Dominica gives two official descriptions of the coat of arms:

=== Heraldic description (blazon) ===
Quarterly Or and Azure a cross fillet counterchanged in the first quarter on a Rocky Mount Sable a Coconut Tree fructed proper in the second a Dominica Crapaud also proper in the third on Water Barry wavy in base a Carib canoe with sail set all likewise proper in the fourth quarter on a Rocky Mount also sable a Banana Tree fructed also proper and for the crest. On a Wreath Argent and Azure a Rocky Mount Sable thereon a Lion Passant guardant Or and for the Supporters. On either side of Sisserou Parrot (Amazona imperials) proper beaked and membered or together with this motto APRES BONDIE C'EST LA TER.

=== Non-heraldic description ===
The Coat of Arms of Dominica bears the inscription 'Apres Bondie C'est La Ter' (lit. 'after God the Earth'), which emphasizes the importance of the soil in the island with its economy based on agriculture.

The design depicts a shield divided into four quarters of a cross, referring to the Island’s name, because of its discovery on a Sunday. In first quarter on the top left, you see the black volcanic soil of Dominica supporting a coconut tree, and in the fourth quarter on bottom right a fully developed banana stem bearing a mature bunch of fruits is shown. Our Crapaud, the second quarter, while in the third quarter, a canoe under sail glides on the Caribbean Sea. A wreath of silver and blue bears the crest, a golden lion standing upon a black rocky mount with the Sisserou parrot (Amazona imperialis) as supporters.

== Gallery ==
Coat of arms of the British Leeward Islands (1909–1940), with the top-right shield representing Dominica
