= Charles Savarin =

President of Dominica (2013–2023)

Charles Savarin DAH
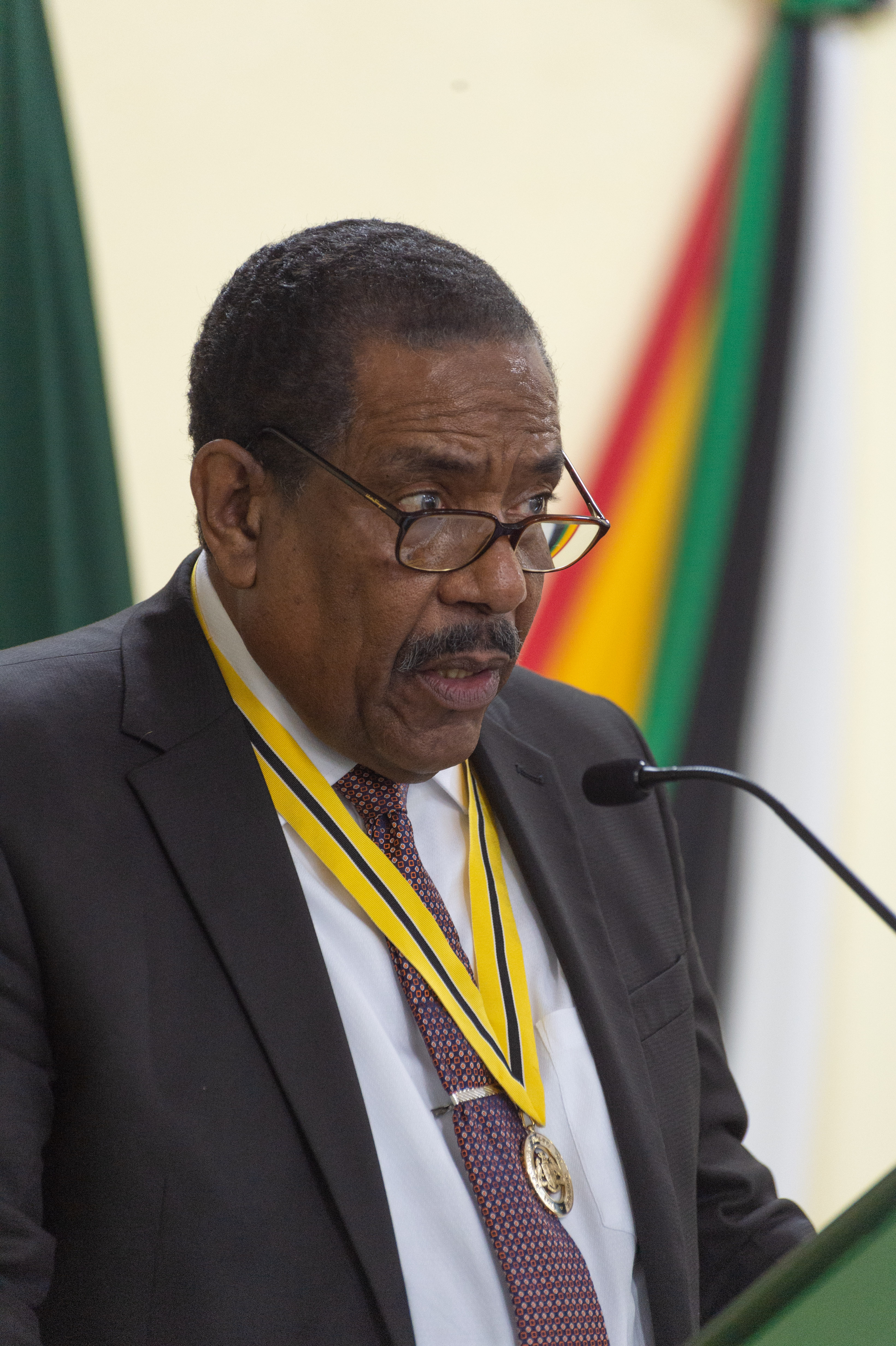
- Savarin in 2014

8th President of Dominica
- In office 2 October 2013 – 2 October 2023
- Prime Minister: Roosevelt Skerrit
- Preceded by: Eliud Williams
- Succeeded by: Sylvanie Burton

Personal details
- Born: 2 October 1943 (age 83) Portsmouth, Dominica
- Party: Labour Party since 2008; Dominica Freedom Party before 2008
- Spouse: Clara Josephine Savarin
- Education: Ruskin College

Charles Angelo Savarin, DAH (born 2 October 1943) is a politician from Dominica who served as President of Dominica from 2013 to 2023. He is a member of the Dominica Labour Party and served for a time as Minister for National Security, Immigration, Labour and the Public Service.

== Political life ==
Following the demise of the Patrick John government (in which Savarin played an integral role), Savarin was made Chairman of the Committee for National Salvation (CNS). This body comprising members of the greater cross section of Dominican Society, was tasked with overseeing the transition to an interim government.

Savarin contested the 1980 General Elections on a Dominica Freedom Party (DFP) ticket, losing to Michael Douglas in a four-way race. Savarin polled 405 votes to Douglas's 531 votes.

In 1983, Savarin was appointed as Minister without Portfolio in the Prime Minister's Office with special responsibility for Trade, Industry and Tourism (1983–1985). Then he worked in the Dominica High Commission in UK from 1985 to 1986.

In 1986, Savarin was appointed Ambassador/Permanent Representative to the European Union. He also served as principal ambassadorial spokesman for African/Caribbean/Pacific States on bananas. That assignment ended in 1993, when he returned to Dominica to become General Manager of the National Development Corporation (NDC).

When Dame Eugenia Charles decided to walk away from politics, Savarin contested the leadership of the Dominica Freedom Party losing to Brian Alleyne. However, he replaced Dame Eugenia as the party's flag bearer in the Roseau Central Constituency. Savarin emerged victorious at the polls with some 1013 votes to Norris Prevo's 759. When Brian Alleyne resigned as DFP leader and leader of the Opposition in 1996, Savarin again entered the leadership race. On 20 April 1996, Savarin received 86 out of 107 votes at the party's General Council. He served as leader of the DFP until 2007 where mounting criticism of his leadership forced him to resign.

Savarin was elected to the House of Assembly in the 1995 election. During his first term as Roseau Central MP, Savarin championed the cause of "equal educational opportunities" for children in the Roseau catchment area. He was again re-elected as MP for Roseau in the 2000 General elections this time by a much reduced margin. Savarin entered into a coalition arrangement with the Rosie Douglas-led Dominica Labour Party. He was appointed Minister for Tourism. After Douglas died some eight months later, Pierre Charles was appointed prime minister. He added the responsibilities of Enterprise Development and The Public Service to Savarin's portfolio.

Savarin was one of the most vocal defenders of the Pierre Charles government, often acting for Charles when the later was overseas. He was also chairman of the cabinet sub-committee on the economy. This placed him in the forefront of discussions and negotiations with the International Monetary Fund and other donor agencies. Savarin was also one of the main speakers at town hall-style meetings of the government to inform the public on the serious difficulties facing the economy. In 2003, as acting Prime Minister Savarin announced the plans by a foreign company to build a billion-dollar oil refinery in Castle Bruce, Dominica. Attempts by the media to contact the company were unsuccessful and the plan did not proceed.

Following the death of Pierre Charles on 6 January 2004, Savarin remained as Tourism Minister after the appointment of Roosevelt Skerrit as prime minister. The Freedom Party continued to decline and won no seats in the May 2005 General Elections. Savarin lost re-election in 2005, but was appointed as a senator by Prime Minister Roosevelt Skerrit. Savarin was also rewarded for his loyalty to the coalition and was named Minister for Foreign Affairs, Trade and Labour (2005–2007). In a cabinet reshuffle, Savarin was made Minister of Public Utilities, Ports and the Public Service from 2007 to 2009.

Savarin joined the Labour Party and was instrumental in the public campaign for the 2009 General Elections. He co-hosted a popular night-time show alongside Attorney Anthony Astaphan and DLP stalwart Eddie Lambert. Savarin, known for his platform oratory skills, was also a key figure on the DLP political platform.

He was appointed minister of public service from 2010 to 2013.

== Trade unionist ==
He served as General Secretary of the Civil Service Association (CSA) for nearly two decades and almost single-handedly organised public service employees into the most powerful trade union in Dominica. During the public service protest action over a 5 percent salary cut in 2003, Savarin was at the forefront in defending the government's action. This aggravated the PSU leadership, with General Secretary Thomas Letang threatening to revoke Savarin's lifetime membership in the union.

As Gabriel J. Christian has written, "Savarin gained nationwide recognition for two CSA-led strikes: the 1973 public service strike over the transfer of radio personality Daniel 'Papa Dee' Cauderion, and the September–October 1977 CSA general strike which had virtually crippled the island." Savarin grew in stature and was the most notable trade union leader on the island. The CSA's orientation was middle class, not working class. Though its membership came from the formerly disenfranchised Dominican working class, which had gained socio-economic ascendancy through earlier Labour Party reform, most of the CSA leadership was now sympathetic to the Freedom Party. Indeed, the CSA and other local trade union now followed the pro business and neo-colonial philosophy of the US AFL-CIO which had pursued a fiercely anti-Leftwing policy in Latin America.

== President ==
Charles Savarin held the mainly ceremonial post of President of Dominica from 2013 to 2023. President Savarin was re-elected in 2018 to a new five-year term.

== Honours ==
Foreign honours

- Two Sicilian Royal Family: Knight Grand Cross of Merit of the Sacred Military Constantinian Order of Saint George (5 November 2014).

National honour

- Dominica Award of Honour (DAH)

Political offices
Preceded by Eliud Williams	President of Dominica; 2013–2023	Succeeded by Sylvanie Burton
