= Nicholas Liverpool =

President of Dominica

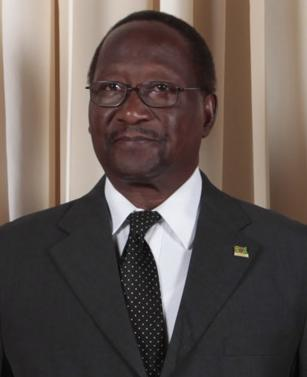

6th President of Dominica
- In office 2 October 2003 – 17 September 2012
- Prime Minister: Pierre Charles; Osborne Riviere (Acting); Roosevelt Skerrit
- Preceded by: Vernon Shaw
- Succeeded by: Eliud Williams

Personal details
- Born: Nicholas Joseph Orville Liverpool; 9 September 1934 Grand Bay, British Leeward Islands
- Died: 1 June 2015 (aged 80) Miami, Florida, U.S.
- Party: Independent
- Spouse(s): Cecilia Koranteng-Addow (m. 1963-1969), Verna Williams
- Children: 7
- Education: University of Hull; City Law School; University of Sheffield

Nicholas Joseph Orville Liverpool (9 September 1934 – 1 June 2015) was a politician and jurist from Dominica who served as the sixth President of Dominica from 2 October 2003 to 17 September 2012.

== Early life, family and education ==
In 1957, Liverpool entered the University of Hull and obtained an LL.B (Hons.) degree in 1960. He was called to the bar at Inner Temple in 1961. He received a Ph.D degree from University of Sheffield in 1965.

The University of Hull awarded him a degree of Doctor of Laws in July 2011.

== Career ==
After returning to the Caribbean, Liverpool was a law lecturer at the University of the West Indies in Barbados for 18 years. In 1992, became dean of its law school. He served as a regional judge and then an appeal court judge in several countries in the Caribbean, including Belize and Grenada. He also served as a high court judge in Antigua and Montserrat and served on a number of tribunals and commissions for legal reform. In 2002 he was chairman of the constitutional review commission for Grenada.

Liverpool became Ambassador to the United States in March 1998, serving in that capacity until 2001.

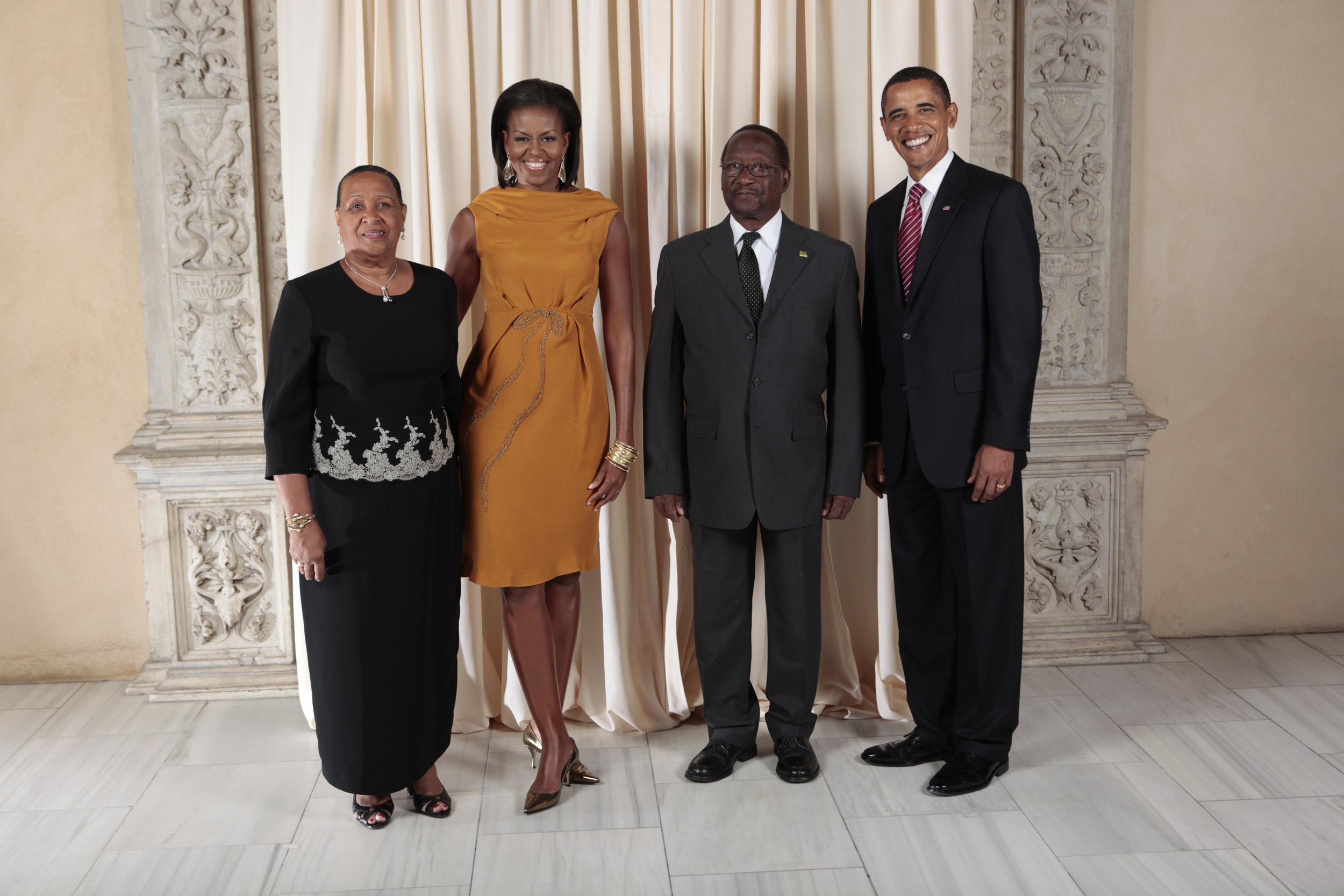
President Barack Obama and First Lady Michelle Obama pose for a photo during a reception at the Metropolitan Museum in New York with Nicholas Liverpool and his wife, Verna Liverpool.

Between 2002 and 2003 he served as a Member of the UNESCO governing board. In July 2008 he served a second term as president, following a joint nomination by Prime Minister Roosevelt Skerrit and Opposition Leader Earl Williams.

== Honors and awards ==
In 2003, the same year he was elected president, Liverpool was awarded the Dominica Award of Honour.

In 2012, Liverpool was awarded and invested by HRH The Duke of Castro of Two Sicilian Royal Family as a Knight Grand Cross with Gold Star of the Sacred Military Constantinian Order of Saint George in recognition to his contribution to law and Catholic life. Liverpool served from 2014 as Vice Delegate for Dominica for the Order.

== Personal life and demise ==
Liverpool's wife was Verna Liverpool. They had five children.

Nicholas Liverpool died on 1 June 2015 in Miami, Florida, where he was receiving medical treatment. He was 80 years old.

== Note ==
Political offices
Preceded by Vernon Shaw	President of Dominica; 2003–2012	Succeeded by Eliud Williams
