= List of presidents of Dominica =

Head of state

President of the Commonwealth of Dominica
- Flag of the president of Dominica

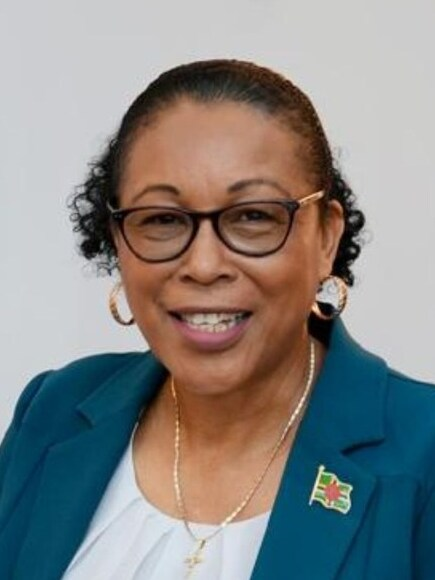
- Incumbent; Sylvanie Burton since 2 October 2023
- Residence: Government House in Roseau
- Term length: Five years; renewable once
- Constituting instrument: Constitution of Dominica
- Inaugural holder: Sir Louis Cools-Lartigue
- Formation: November 3, 1978 (47 years ago)
- Salary: EC$91,000 annually
- Website: presidentoffice.gov.dm

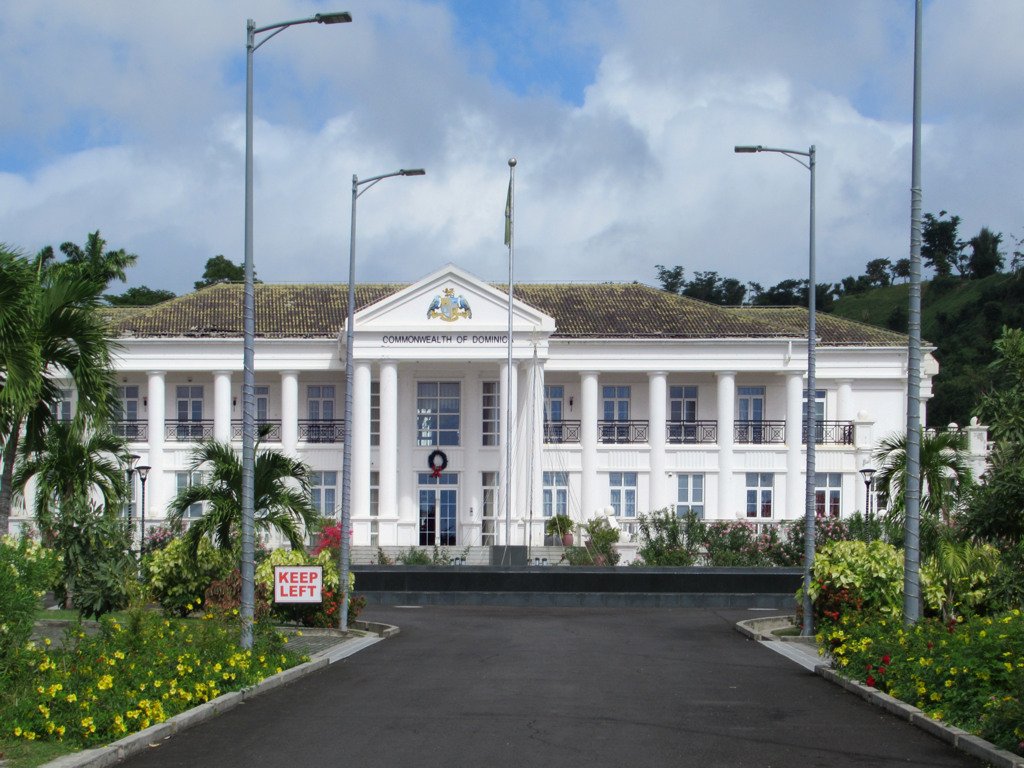
Government House in Roseau, the residence of the president of Dominica

The president of Dominica is the head of state under the system implemented by the Constitution of 1978, the year of Dominica's independence.

Unlike other former British colonies in the region, Dominica did not retain Queen Elizabeth II, represented by a Governor-General, as head of state, on its independence, instead electing to become a parliamentary republic with a President as ceremonial head of state, a compromise between the governing Dominica Labour Party, which favoured retaining the monarchy, and the opposition Dominica Freedom Party, which favoured a republic with an executive presidency.

The current president is Sylvanie Burton, since 2 October 2023.

== List of officeholders ==
Political parties

Dominica Labour Party (DLP)

Other affiliations

Independent

Status

Denotes interim or acting president

No.	Portrait	Name (Birth–Death)	Elected	Term of office			Political party
No.	Portrait	Name (Birth–Death)	Elected	Took office	Left office	Time in office	Political party
—		Sir Louis Cools-Lartigue (1905–1993)	—	3 November 1978	16 January 1979	74 days	Independent
1		Fred Degazon (1913–2008) (Note: Left Dominica on 11 June 1979.)	1978	16 January 1979	29 January 1980	1 year, 13 days	Independent
—		Sir Louis Cools-Lartigue (1905–1993) (Note: Acting for Degazon.)	—	15 June 1979	16 June 1979	1 day	Independent
—		Jenner Armour (1932–2001) (Note: Acting for Degazon until 29 January 1980.)	—	21 June 1979	25 February 1980	249 days	Independent
2		Aurelius Marie (1904–1995)	1980	25 February 1980	19 December 1983	3 years, 297 days	Independent
3		Clarence Seignoret (1919–2002) (Note: Sir Clarence Seignoret from 25 October 1985.)	1983 1988	19 December 1983	25 October 1993	9 years, 310 days	Independent
4		Crispin Sorhaindo (1931–2010)	1993	25 October 1993	5 October 1998	4 years, 345 days	Independent
5		Vernon Shaw (1930–2013)	1998	6 October 1998	1 October 2003	4 years, 360 days	Independent
6		Nicholas Liverpool (1934–2015)	2003; 2008	1 October 2003	17 September 2012	8 years, 352 days	Independent
7		Eliud Williams (born 1948)	2012	17 September 2012	2 October 2013	1 year, 15 days	DLP
8		Charles Savarin (born 1943)	2013; 2018	2 October 2013	2 October 2023	10 years	DLP
9		Sylvanie Burton (born 1965)	2023	2 October 2023	Incumbent	3 years, 12 days	DLP

== See also ==
- List of colonial governors and administrators of Dominica
- List of heads of government of Dominica
- Lists of office-holders
