= George Townsend (priest) =

George Townsend (1788 – 23 November 1857) was an English priest and author.

== Life ==
Born at Ramsgate, Kent, he was the son of George Townsend, an Independent minister there and author of published sermons. He was educated at Ramsgate, and attracted the attention of Richard Cumberland, with whose help he was able to go to Trinity College, Cambridge. He graduated Bachelor of Arts (BA) in 1812 and Cambridge Master of Arts (MA Cantab) in 1816, was ordained deacon in 1813 and priest in the year following, and in 1813 became curate of Littleport, Cambridgeshire; he then moved to Hackney as curate to John James Watson.

In 1816 he was appointed professor at the Royal Military College, Sandhurst, and at the same time undertook the curacy of Farnborough, Hampshire. His work on the Old Testament was noticed by several eminent men, including Shute Barrington, Bishop of Durham, who appointed him his domestic chaplain in 1822. This was the period of great controversy over Catholic Emancipation, and Townsend wrote works for that debate. On 25 August 1825 he received the tenth prebendal stall in the see of Durham, which he retained until his death. He also obtained, on 26 April 1826 the chapter living of Northallerton, which he exchanged on 22 February 1839 for the perpetual curacy of St Margaret, Durham.

In 1850 he undertook a journey to Italy with the intention of converting Pope Pius IX. He died at the college in Durham.

== Works ==
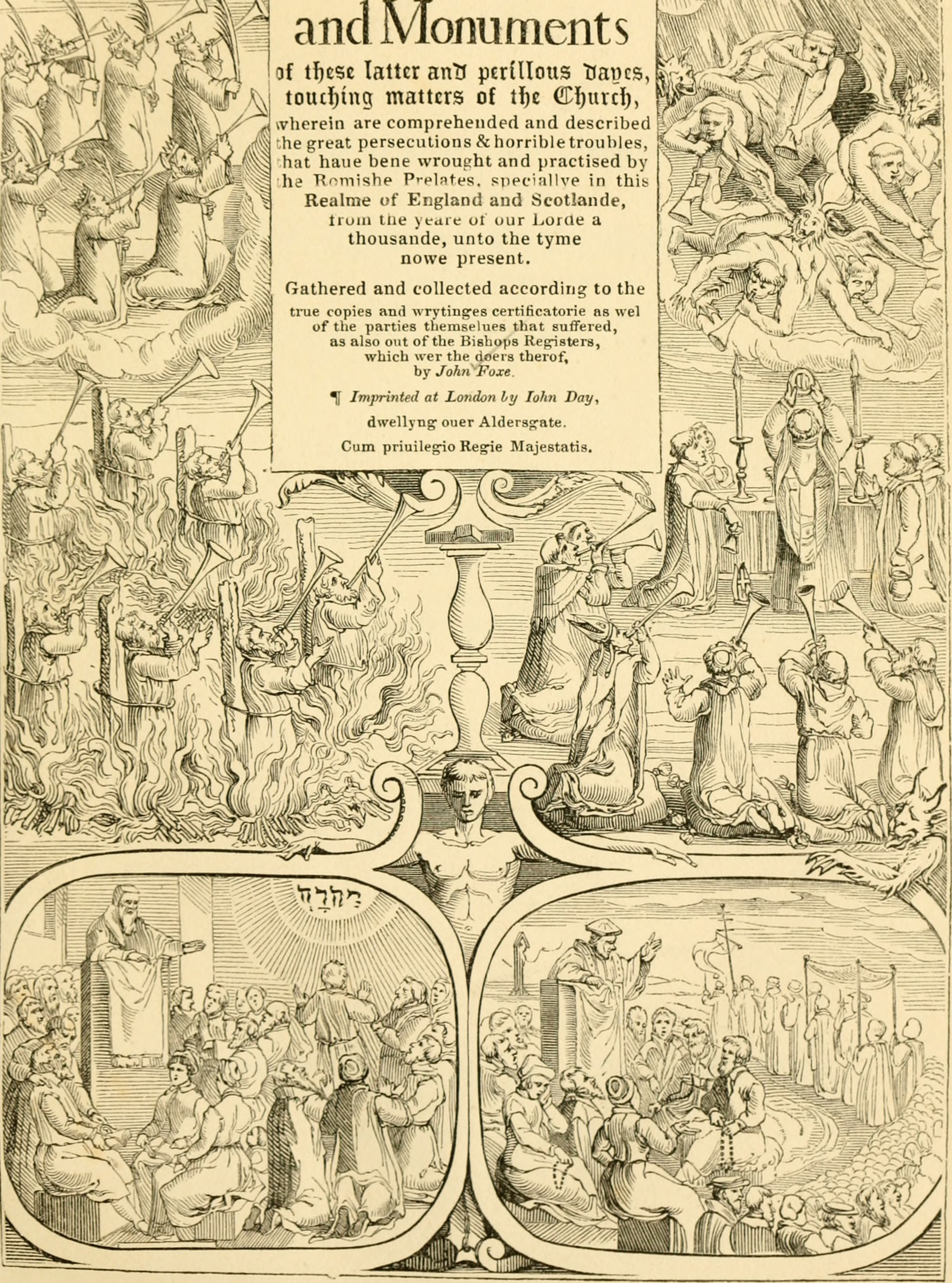
THE ACTS AND MONUMENTS OF JOHN FOXE: A NEW AND COMPLETE EDITION WITH A PRELIMINARY DISSERTATION, BY THE REV. GEORGE TOWNSEND (1837)

In 1811 appeared his first published work, a reply to William Drummond of Logiealmond, who in Œdipus Judaicus alleged that the greater part of the Old Testament was a solar allegory, and that the twelve patriarchs symbolised the signs of the zodiac. Townsend rejoined with Œdipus Romanus, in which by similar reasoning he showed that the signs of the zodiac were represented by the twelve Cæsars. In 1821 appeared the first part of his major work, The Old Testament arranged in historical and chronological order, London; 5th edit. 1860; the sequel was The New Testament arranged in historical and chronological order, London, 1826; 5th edit. 1860.

As contribution to the polemical literature of Catholic emancipation, at the request of Barrington, Townsend in 1825 published The Accusations of History against the Church of Rome; new edition 1845. The work was intended as a reply to Charles Butler's Historical Memoirs of the English, Scottish, and Irish Catholics since the Reformation, 1822.

In 1836 Townsend compiled a Life and Vindication of John Foxe the martyrologist; it was prefixed to the first volume of the edition of the Acts and Monuments by Stephen Reed Cattley (8 vols. 1837–41). His Life and Defence of the Principles of Bishop Bonner (London, 1842) was ironical. On his return from Italy he published an account of his journey, under the title Journal of a Tour in Italy in 1850, with an Account of an Interview with the Pope in the Vatican, London, 1850.

Townsend wrote other works including:

- Poems, London, 1810.
- Armageddon, a Poem, London, 1816.
- Thirty Sermons on some of the most interesting Subjects in Theology, London, 1830.
- Plan for abolishing Pluralities and Non-residence, London, 1833.
- Spiritual Communion with God; or the Pentateuch and the Book of Job arranged, 2 vols. London, 1845–9.
- Historical Researches: Ecclesiastical and Civil History from the Ascension of our Lord to the Death of Wycliffe, philosophically considered with reference to a future Reunion of Christians, London, 1847.
- Twenty-seven Sermons on Miscellaneous Subjects, London, 1849.

Townsend also wrote a series of sonnets to accompany Thomas Stothard's illustrations of the Pilgrim's Progress; and edited in 1828 the ‘Theological Works’ of John Barrington, 1st Viscount Barrington.

== Family ==
He was twice married, and by his first wife left a son, George Fyler Townsend, who was later perpetual curate of St Michael's, Burleigh Street, Westminster.

== Sources ==
- Lee, Sidney, ed. (1899). "Townsend, George (1788-1857)" . Dictionary of National Biography. Vol. 57. London: Smith, Elder & Co.

Attribution

This article incorporates text from a publication now in the public domain: Lee, Sidney, ed. (1899). "Townsend, George (1788-1857)". Dictionary of National Biography. Vol. 57. London: Smith, Elder & Co.
