= Judaicus =

Judaicus may refer to:

- The Fiscus Iudaicus was a tax imposed on Jews by the Roman Empire after the destruction of the Temple of Jerusalem in 70 CE
- Oedipus Judaicus by William Drummond was first published in 1811 to a limited release of 200 copies

== See also ==
- Judaicum (disambiguation)
- Judaico (disambiguation)
