= Hugh Boscawen =

Hugh Boscawen may refer to:

- Hugh Boscawen (1625–1701), British politician
- Hugh Boscawen, 1st Viscount Falmouth (c. 1680–1734), British Whig politician
- Hugh Boscawen, 2nd Viscount Falmouth (1707–1782), British soldier and politician
- Hugh Boscawen (died 1795), British politician
