= Sir William Young, 2nd Baronet =

British politician and colonial administrator

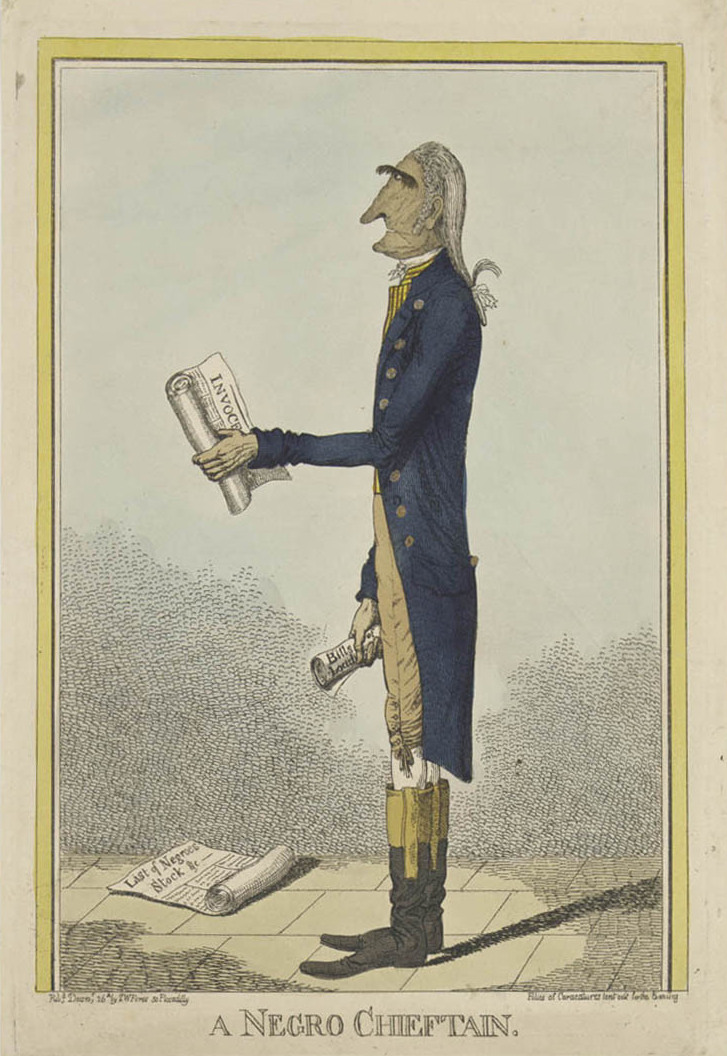
1802 caricature of Young titled "A Negro Chieftain", referencing his ownership of slaves

Sir William Young, 2nd Baronet, FRS, FSA (December 1749 – 10 January 1815) was a British politician and colonial administrator. He was the governor of Tobago from 1807 – January 1815, and Member of Parliament for St Mawes, 19 June 1784 – 3 November 1806, and Buckingham, 5 November 1806 – 23 March 1807.

== Early life ==
William Young was born in Charlton, Kent on December 1749, the eldest son of Sir William Young, 1st Baronet, governor of Dominica, and his second wife, Elizabeth Young, the daughter of the mathematician Brook Taylor. His siblings included Sarah Elizabeth, Portia, Elizabeth, Mary Young Sewell, Henry, John, and Olivia. As a child, he and ten other family members were featured in the oil on canvas painting, The Family of Sir William Young, Baronet (ca.1766) by Johan Zoffany. He enrolled at Clare College, Cambridge, in 1767 but transferred to University College, Oxford, on 26 November 1768. After graduating he travelled France and Italy and documented his travels. In 1777, he published The spirit of Athens, an acclaimed insight into the political and philosophical history of Greece.

== Career ==
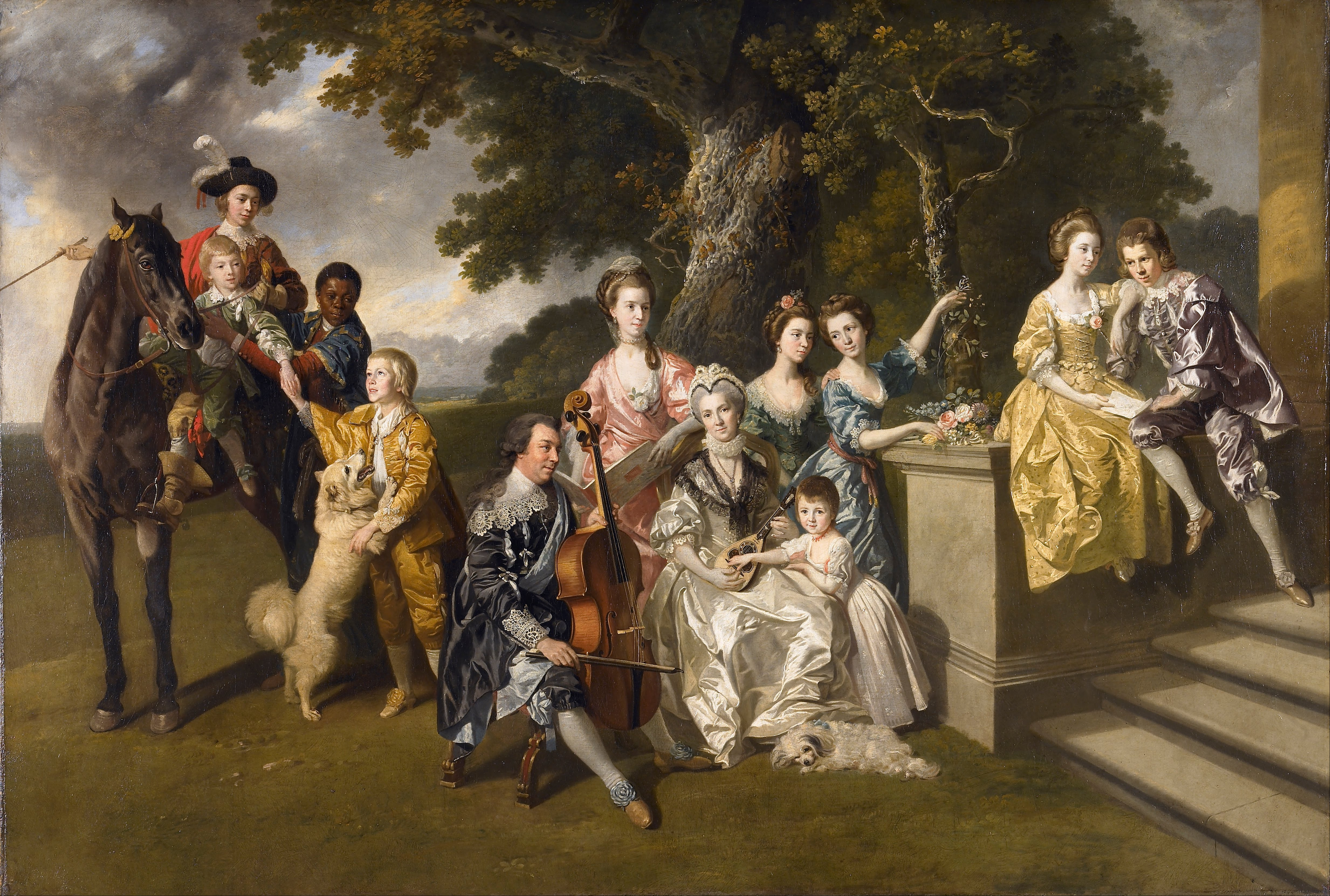
A portrait of the Young family by Johan Zoffany c. 1767; William Young is first from right.

In 1782, Young he was appointed by the proprietors of the colony of Tobago to represent them in the French court to settle territorial disputes. He returned to England in 1784 where he settled and became an MP for St Mawes, Cornwall from 19 June, a seat which he held until 3 November 1806, when he was elected for Buckingham. He was elected a fellow of the Royal Society in 1786 and a fellow of the Society of Antiquaries in 1791. In 1788, his father died and passed on four sugar plantations to his son—one in Antigua, two in St Vincent, and one in Tobago—and a total of 896 African slaves. His father had also been seriously in debt and left a sum of around £110,000 (£14,339,355 in 2025 pounds) for his son to pay off. A secretary to the Association for Promoting the Discovery of the Interior Parts of Africa, Young spoke regular in parliament on poor-law reform, income tax, the slave trade, union with Ireland, foreign and colonial policy, and parliamentary reform.

On 30 October 1791, Young took a break from British politics and departed on a trip for several months in which he explored Barbados, St Vincent, Tobago, and Grenada, failing to save his plantations from bankruptcy and learn about the sugar industry and slave trade in the West Indies. He later documented part of his travels in the appendix of the second edition of An Historical Survey of the Island of Saint Domingo by Bryan Edwards in 1801, a book that defended the slave trade, in which he also served as chief editor. He printed a posthumous work of his grandfather, Brook Taylor, entitled Contemplatio Philosophica for private circulation in 1793, prefaced by a life of the author, and with an appendix containing letters by Bolingbroke, Bossuet, and others. Notable works by Young also included The rights of Englishmen, or, The British constitution of government compared with that of a democratic republic (1793); Considerations on Poorhouses and Workhouses: their Pernicious Tendency (1796), Instructions for the Armed Yeomanry (1797) and The West Indian Commonplace Book (1807).

Young reported that he had been extremely well treated by his slaves, who he claimed had presented him with gifts and put on festivities for him. On returning home to England to resume his MP duties for St Mawes in 1792, he advocated the amelioration of conditions for slaves, arguing that the trade of human beings from Africa to the islands would naturally die out without the need for parliamentary intervention. However, Young's reform plans were 'naïve and utopian', and William Wilberforce and his allies gained enough votes to pass the Slave Trade Act 1807. The same year, Young was appointed Governor of Tobago, a post which he retained until his death. He died on 10 January 1815 at Government House, Tobago.

== Personal life ==
On 12 August 1777, he married Sarah at St George the Martyr, Queen Square, London, the daughter and coheir of Charles Lawrence and his wife, Mary, née Mihil. They had four sons and two daughters. Sarah died in 1791 and Young remarried on 22 April 1793 at St George's, Hanover Square, London, to Barbara, the daughter of Colonel Richard Talbot and his wife, Margaret, later Baroness Talbot of Malahide. Sarah's uncle was Peter Talbot, Archbishop of Dublin. She survived Young, dying 15 years later after his death in 1830.

Parliament of Great Britain
Preceded by Viscount Clare; Hugh Boscawen	Member of Parliament for St Mawes; 1784–1800; With: Hugh Boscawen to 1790; John Graves Simcoe 1790–92; Thomas Calvert 1792–95; William Drummond 1795–96; George Nugent 1796; Jeremiah Crutchley from 1796	Succeeded by Parliament of the United Kingdom
Parliament of the United Kingdom
Preceded by Parliament of Great Britain	Member of Parliament for St Mawes; 1801–1806; With: Jeremiah Crutchley to 1802; William Windham from 1802	Succeeded by Scrope Bernard; Sir John Newport, Bt
Preceded by Earl Percy; Thomas Grenville	Member of Parliament for Buckingham; 1806–1807; With: Thomas Grenville	Succeeded by Sir John Borlase Warren, Bt; Thomas Grenville
Baronetage of Great Britain
Preceded by William Young	Baronet (of North Dean); 1788–1815	Succeeded by William Young
