= Thomas Calvert (MP) =

Member of Parliament for St Mawes 1792 to 1795.

Thomas Calvert (born 26 May 1755) was a Member of parliament (MP) for St Mawes from 1792 to 1795.

Calvert was born in St Giles-without-Cripplegate, son of Felix Calvert and nephew of the MP John Calvert. He joined the East India Company in 1772 and worked as a merchant in the salt agency, becoming comptroller of the salt agency in 1788.

He returned to England in 1789. In 1791 William Pitt the Younger recommended him for the rotten borough of St Mawes. He served as MP for that constituency from 1792 to 1795.

Calvert married Anne Philpott in 1787, and they had two sons and five daughters together. He is believed to have died abroad, at some time after 1821.

Parliament of England
Preceded by Sir William Young; John Graves Simcoe	Member of Parliament for St Mawes; 1792–1795; With: Sir William Young	Succeeded by Sir William Young; William Drummond
