= Mary Anne Burges =

Scottish writer

- Born: 6 December 1763; Edinburgh
- Died: 10 August 1813 (aged 49); Ashfield near Honiton

Mary Anne Burges (6 December 1763 – 10 August 1813) was a Scottish writer who wrote a successful sequel to The Pilgrim's Progress.

== Life ==
Burges was born in Edinburgh in 1763 to George and Anne Burges. Her father had distinguished himself at the Battle of Culloden by capturing the standard of Charles Edward Stewart and was later deputy paymaster in Gibraltar; he was in charge of the customs when she was born.

Burges was a gifted linguist familiar with five to seven European languages. Her particular interests were geology and botany. Her group of friends included Anne Elliot, Jean-André Deluc and the diarist Elizabeth Simcoe. She is said to have been a major contributor to Deluc's last book and she sketched her friend Elizabeth Simcoe, as well as illustrating her own botanical descriptions.

== Sequel ==
She is known for anonymously publishing a sequel to John Bunyan's renowned allegorical work The Pilgrim's Progress. Her book, The Progress of the Pilgrim Good-Intent, in Jacobinical Times, has as its hero "Good-Intent", who according to the book's introduction he is the great, great-grandson of John Bunyan's hero, "Christian". The book went through seven editions in English, two in Ireland and three in America by 1802, and established Burges as a professional and independent woman. She died in 1813 at her house in Ashfield.

An introduction by her elder brother, Sir James Lamb, 1st Baronet (born James Burges), to a later edition of her book revealed the identity of the book's author. In 1814 the book was reissued with John Bowdler for another edition.
