= Wolford Chapel =

Historic house museum in Devon, England

Coordinates: 50.8402°N 3.2268°W

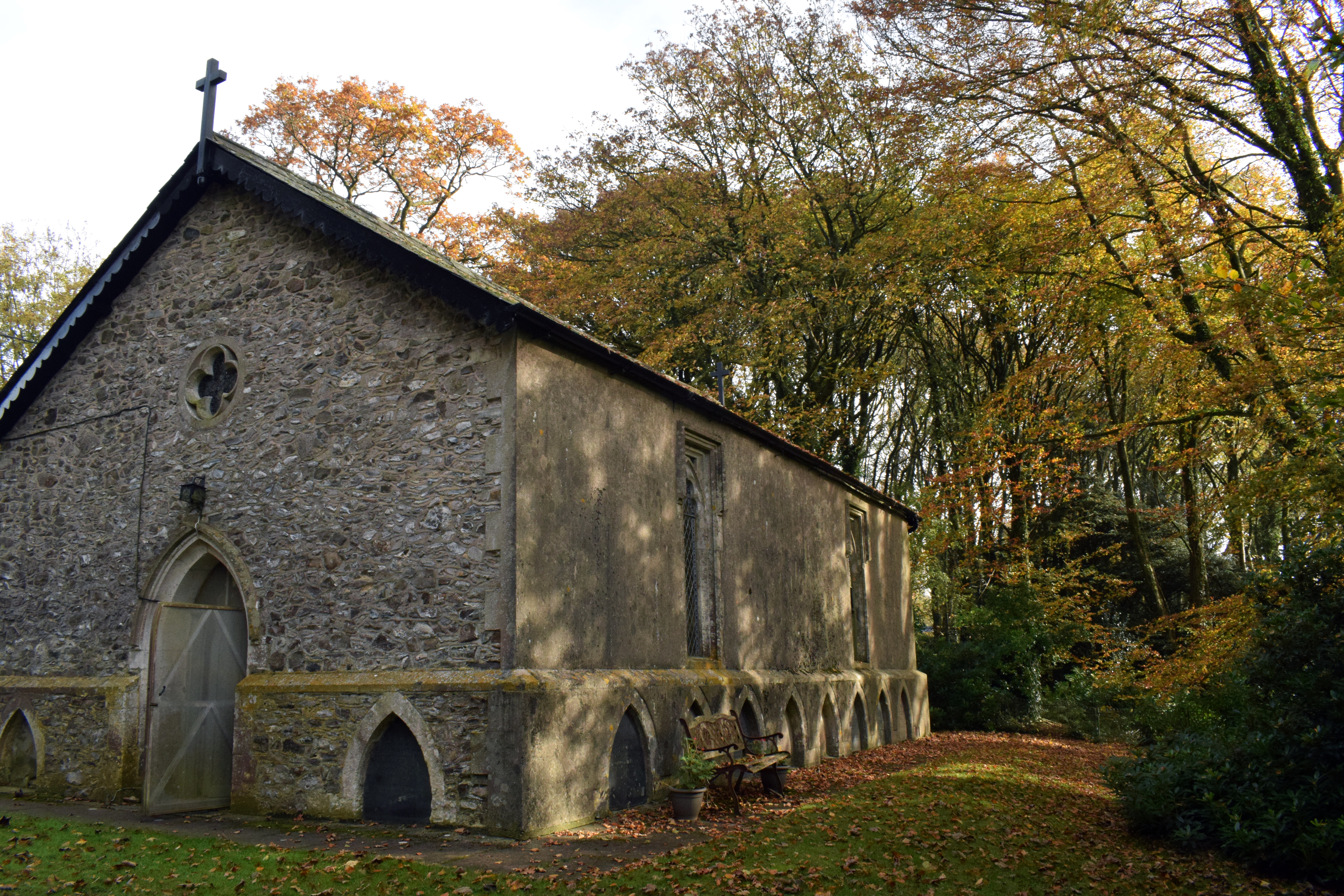
- Established: 1958
- Location: Honiton, Devon, England
- Type: Historic house museum Ontario Heritage Trust
- Website: OHT page

Wolford Chapel in Devon, England, is the burial place of John Graves Simcoe, the first lieutenant governor of Upper Canada. The building and land are publicly owned by the Canadian province of Ontario, and flies the Flag of Canada despite being in the English countryside.

The chapel was part of the Simcoe Estate at Dunkeswell, near Honiton, Devon, in South West England and was built on John Graves Simcoe's commission in 1802, possibly on the site of Old Wulphere Church. The site is on the estate that the Simcoes had purchased at Wolford in order to build Wolford Lodge.

Following Simcoe's death on 26 October 1806, the estate remained with the family until 1923 but was eventually sold and some parts were broken up. The Chapel, alongside most of the estate, was acquired by British publisher Sir Geoffrey Harmsworth.

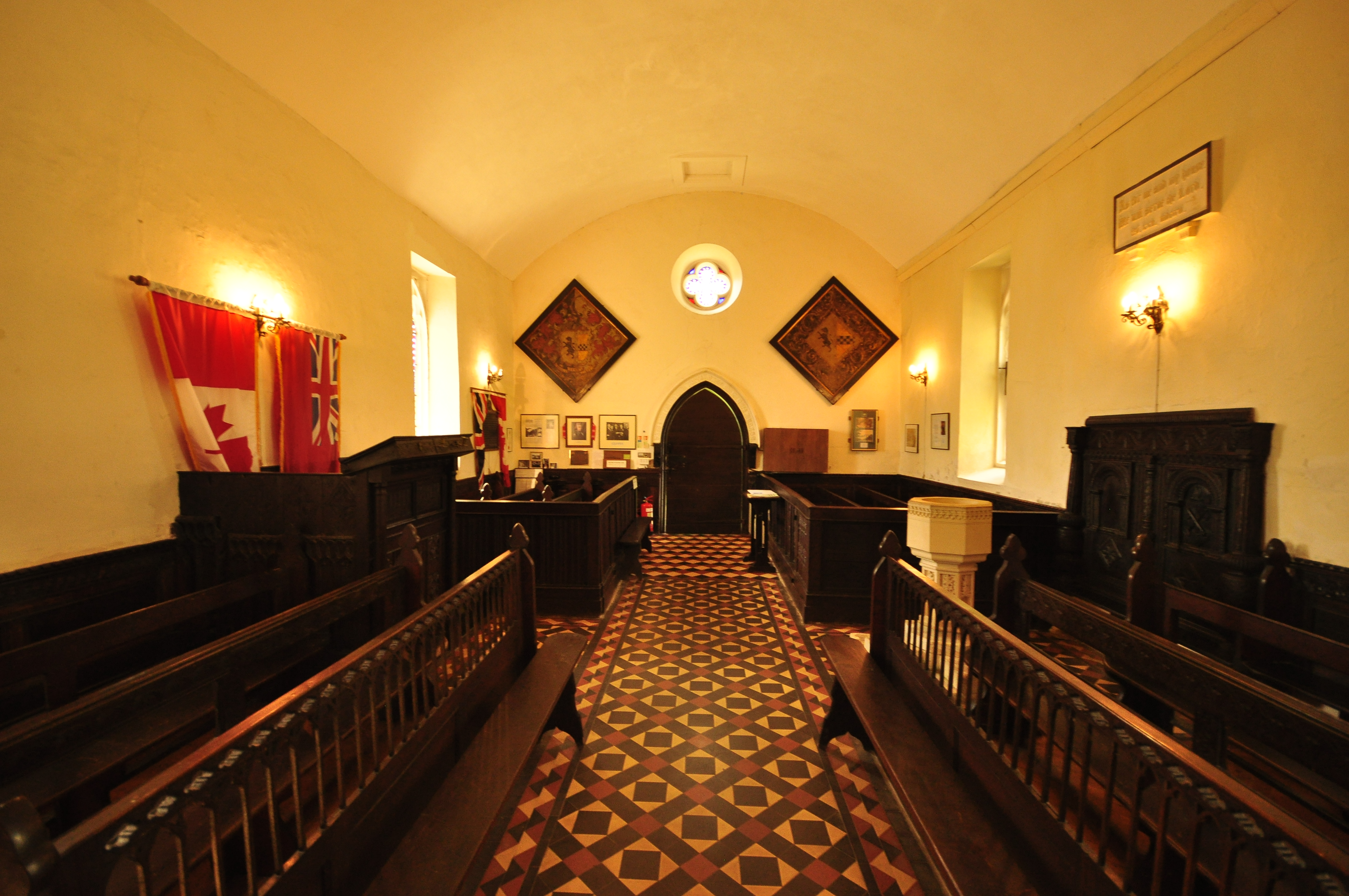
Interior view looking towards the entrance in the west wall

Consideration of what to do with the chapel remained, and various ideas were put forward including transporting it to Canada. However, in 1966, Harmsworth decided to donate the chapel to the John Graves Simcoe Memorial Foundation on behalf of the people of Ontario.

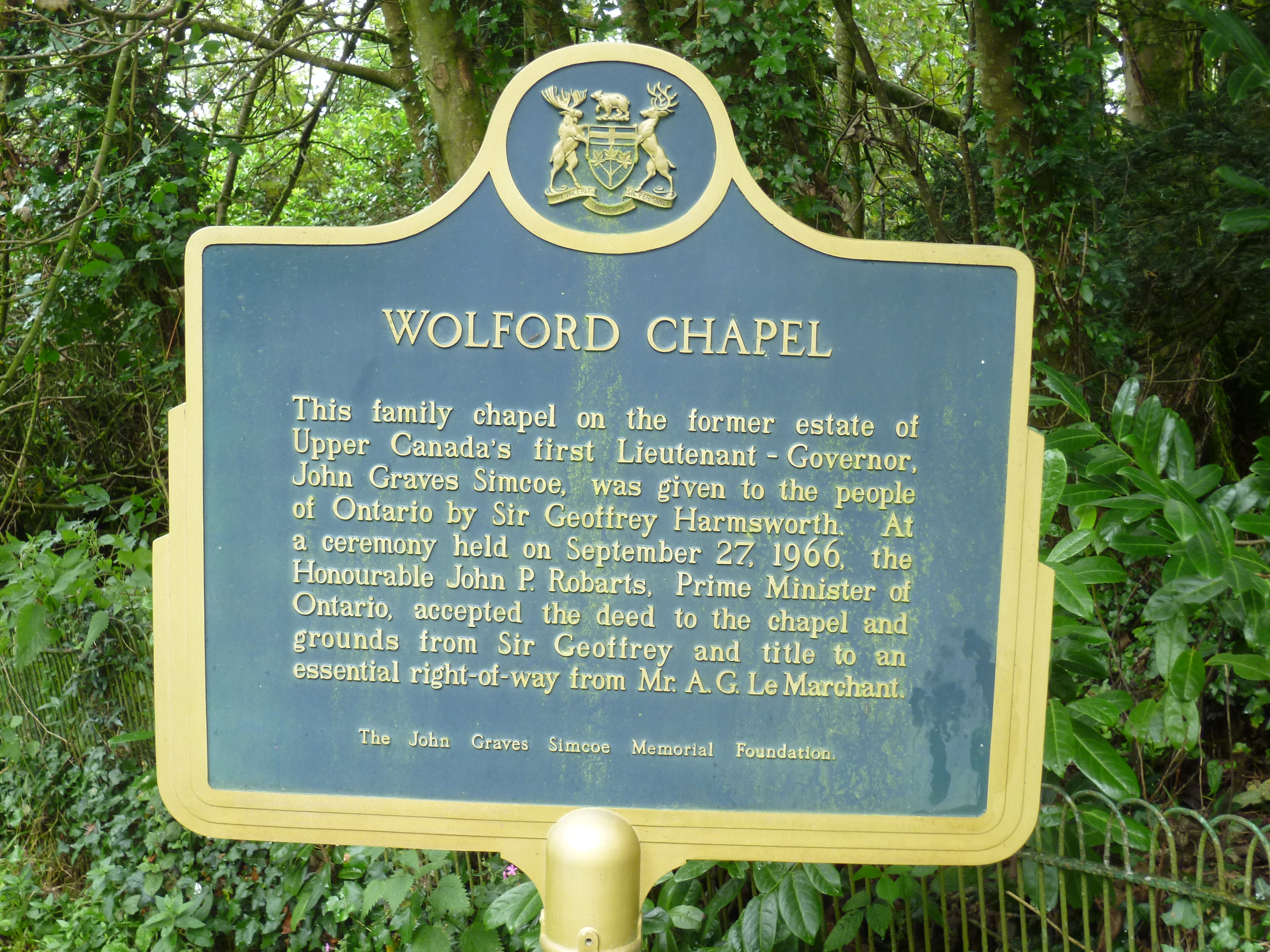
The historic plaque

On 27 September 1966, just under 160 years after Simcoe's death, Harmsworth gave a deed to then-Premier of Ontario John Robarts, alongside a deed making a permanent right of way to access the property, presented by A. G. LeMarchant. In the same year, a restoration had been completed by Harmsworth. A historic plaque was erected on the site by the Archaeological and Historic Sites Board of Ontario.

In 1982, the Ontario Heritage Trust acquired the title to the property.

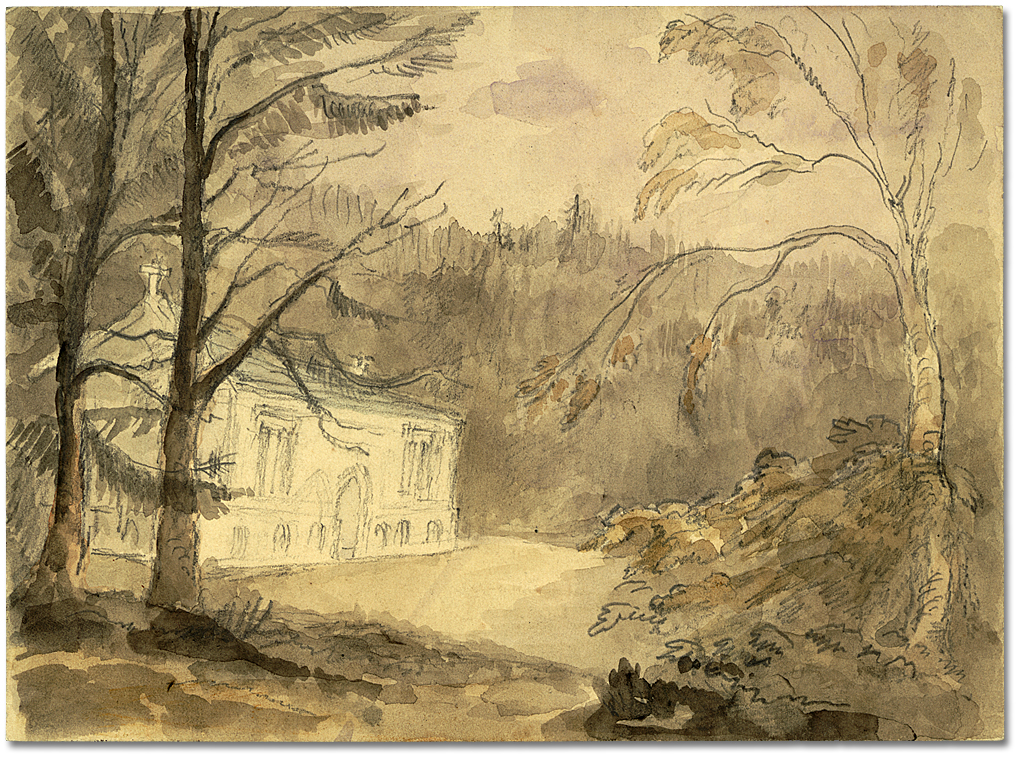
Wolford Chapel sketched by Elizabeth Simcoe

Funds were also provided by the John Graves Simcoe Memorial Foundation to allow for long-term care. Subsequently, the Trust, working with the Foundation Committee, arranged for restoration work on the structure.

The chapel is a Grade II listed building. It is a small structure, rectangular in plan, built of local stone rubble with limestone ashlar details and a slate roof.

It is also the burial place of Simcoe, his wife Elizabeth Simcoe (1766-1850), and six of their eleven children. (Rev Henry Addington Simcoe is buried in Cornwall, England and Katherine, b. 1793 died in Upper Canada, is buried in Toronto.) The site continues to be maintained by local residents on behalf of the Foundation.
