= John Graves Simcoe =

British army officer, politician and colonial administrator (1752–1806)

Lieutenant-General John Graves Simcoe
- Portrait by Jean-Laurent Mosnier, 1791

1st Lieutenant Governor of Upper Canada
- In office 1791–1796
- Monarch: George III
- Governor General: Guy Carleton, 1st Baron Dorchester
- Premier: William Pitt the Younger
- Preceded by: Office established
- Succeeded by: Peter Russell

Personal details
- Born: 25 February 1752 Cotterstock, Northamptonshire
- Died: 26 October 1806 (aged 54) Exeter, Devonshire
- Spouse: Elizabeth Posthuma Gwillim (m. 1782)
- Children: 11
- Parents: John Simcoe; Katherine Simcoe
- Education: Exeter School; Eton College; Merton College, Oxford

Military service
- Allegiance: Great Britain; United Kingdom
- Branch/service: British Army; Provincial Corps
- Years of service: 1770–1806
- Rank: Lieutenant-general
- Unit: 35th Regiment of Foot; 40th Regiment of Foot
- Commands: Queen's Rangers; 81st Regiment of Foot; 22nd Regiment of Foot; Commander-in-Chief, India
- Battles/wars: American War of Independence; Boston campaign; Siege of Boston; New York and New Jersey campaign; Philadelphia campaign; Battle of Brandywine (WIA); Battle of Quinton's Bridge; Battle of Crooked Billet; Battle of Monmouth; Yorktown campaign; Raid on Richmond; Battle of Spencer's Ordinary; Siege of Yorktown (POW); Haitian Revolution

Lieutenant-General John Graves Simcoe (25 February 1752 – 26 October 1806) was a British army officer, politician, and colonial administrator who served as the lieutenant governor of Upper Canada from 1791 to 1796. Born in Cotterstock, he was educated at Exeter Grammar School and Eton College before joining the British army as an ensign in the 35th Regiment of Foot in 1770. Simcoe was promoted to lieutenant in 1774 and was sent with his regiment to Massachusetts in 1775 to serve in the American War of Independence, serving in the siege of Boston before transferring to the 40th Regiment of Foot at the rank of captain and commanding his new regiment's grenadier company in the New York and New Jersey and Philadelphia campaigns.

In 1777 Simcoe became the commanding officer of the Loyalist Queen's Rangers regiment at the rank of major. He commanded the regiment for the remainder of the Philadelphia campaign before carrying out several raids in New Jersey and New York. Simcoe was promoted to lieutenant colonel of the regiment in 1778 and captured by American forces in 1779. Released at the end of that year he rejoined his regiment in Virginia and participated in the 1781 Yorktown campaign, where Simcoe was captured at the siege of Yorktown. He was invalided back to England in December 1781. Simcoe married Elizabeth Gwillim in 1782 and was elected to the House of Commons in 1790 for St Mawes, where he spoke out against the Atlantic slave trade.

Simcoe was appointed as the first lieutenant governor of Upper Canada in 1791 and resigned his parliamentary seat in 1792 upon assuming his new office. In addition to spearheading the introduction of English legal systems and freehold land tenure in the colony, he also founded York, the present-day city of Toronto, in 1793. Simcoe was promoted to major general in 1794 and lieutenant-general in 1796 along with serving as the governor of British-occupied Saint-Domingue from 1796 to 1797. He was appointed as the Commander-in-Chief, India in 1806 but died in Exeter from illness before assuming the post. Seen by many Canadians as a founding figure in Canadian history, Simcoe commemorated annually in Toronto with Simcoe Day.

== Early life ==
Simcoe was the only surviving son of Cornishman John (1710–1759) and Katherine Simcoe (died 1767). His parents had four sons, but he was the only one to live past childhood; Percy drowned in 1764, while Paulet and John William died as infants. His father was a captain in the Royal Navy who commanded the 60-gun HMS Pembroke during the siege of Louisbourg, with James Cook as his sailing master. He died of pneumonia on 15 May 1759 on board his ship in the mouth of the Saint Lawrence River a few months before the siege of Quebec, and was buried at sea. The family then moved to his mother's parental home in Exeter. His paternal grandparents were William and Mary (née Hutchinson) Simcoe.

He was educated at Exeter Grammar School and Eton College. He spent a year at Merton College, Oxford; he was then admitted to Lincoln's Inn, but decided to follow the military career for which his father had intended him. He was initiated into Freemasonry in Union Lodge, Exeter, on 2 November 1773.

== American War of Independence ==
In 1770 Simcoe joined the British Army as an ensign in the 35th Regiment of Foot, and he purchased a promotion to lieutenant on 12 March 1774. Following the outbreak of the American War of Independence he was sent with his regiment to the Thirteen Colonies in April 1775 and served in the siege of Boston. On 27 December 1775 Simcoe purchased a captaincy in the 40th Regiment of Foot. He commanded the regiment's grenadier company in the New York and New Jersey and Philadelphia campaigns. Simcoe commanded the regimental grenadier company at the Battle of Brandywine on 11 September 1777, where he was wounded. Legend has it that Simcoe ordered his men at Brandywine not to fire upon three fleeing Americans, among whom was George Washington.

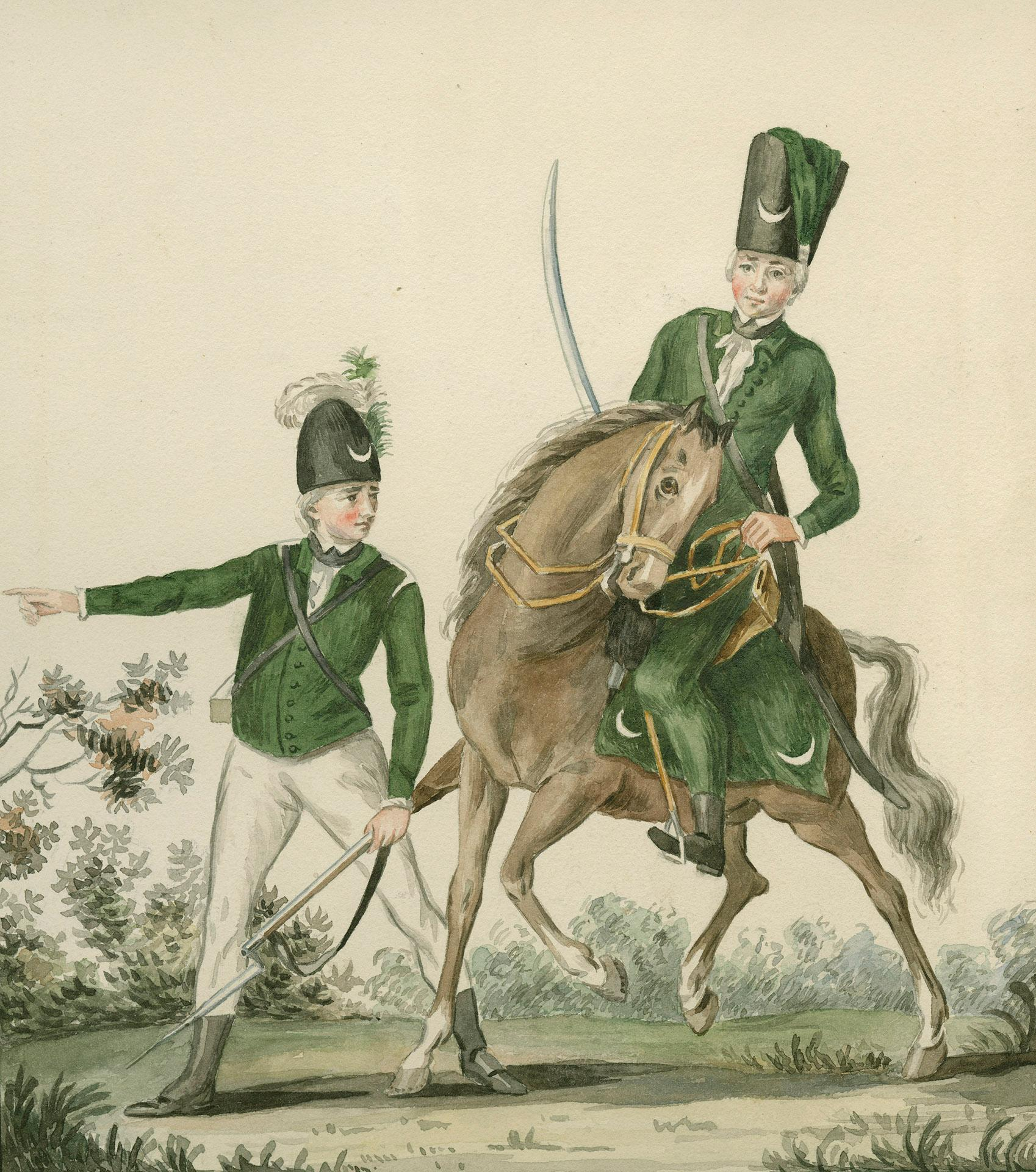
Troops of Queen's Rangers, which Simcoe commanded during the American War of Independence

In 1777 Simcoe sought to raise a Loyalist regiment of free Blacks from Boston but instead was offered and accepted the command of the Queen's Rangers, a Provincial Corps regiment raised on Staten Island on 15 October, as the regimental major. The regiment comprised nine light companies, one grenadier company and one hussar company, each comprising 30 officers and other ranks, and saw extensive action during the Philadelphia campaign, including a successful surprise attack (planned and executed by Simcoe) at the Battle of Crooked Billet.

In 1778, Simcoe led an attack on Judge William Hancock's house during a foraging expedition opposed by Patriot militia. Hancock was also killed, although he was not with the Americans. The attack took place at night and with bayonets. He was promoted to lieutenant colonel of the regiment in June. On 28 June, Simcoe and his Queen's Rangers took part in the Battle of Monmouth, in and near Freehold, New Jersey. On 31 August Simcoe earned a victory over Daniel Nimham's Native American force serving under the Continental Army as the Stockbridge Militia in the Battle of Kingsbridge (also known as the "Stockbridge Massacre"). The skirmish had been planned by Simcoe for an earlier ambush by the same unit, and took place in what today is Van Cortlandt Park in the Bronx, New York. The battlefield is recognized as the Indian Field there.

On 26 October 1779, Simcoe and 80 men launched an attack on central New Jersey from southern Staten Island known as Simcoe's Raid, from what is known today as the Conference House, resulting in the burning of Patriot supplies inside a Dutch Reformed Church in Finderne, including hay and grain; the release of Loyalist prisoners from the Somerset County Courthouse; and Simcoe's capture by Armand Tuffin de La Rouërie. Simcoe was released at the end of 1779 and rejoined his unit in Virginia. He participated in the raid on Richmond with Benedict Arnold in January 1781 and was involved in the Battle of Spencer's Ordinary and captured at the siege of Yorktown. He was invalided back to England in December 1781 and was promoted to lieutenant colonel in the British army on 2 April 1782.

Simcoe wrote a book on his experiences with the Queen's Rangers, titled A Journal of the Operations of the Royal Queen's Rangers from the end of the year 1777 to the conclusion of the late American War, which was published in 1787. He served briefly as Inspector General of Recruitment for the British Army, from 1789 until he departed for Upper Canada two years later.

== Marriage and family ==
Simcoe convalesced at the Devon home of his godfather, Admiral Samuel Graves. In 1782, Simcoe married Elizabeth Posthuma Gwillim, his godfather's ward. Elizabeth was a wealthy heiress who acquired a 5,000-acre (2,000 ha) estate at Honiton in Devon and built Wolford Lodge. Wolford was the Simcoe family seat until 1923.

The Simcoes had five daughters before their posting in Canada. Their son Francis was born in 1791. Their Canadian-born daughter, Katherine, died in infancy in York. She is buried in the Victoria Square Memorial Park on Portland Avenue, Toronto. Francis returned with his father to England when his tenure expired and joined the army. He was killed in an infantry charge during the Peninsular War in 1812. Their other son Henry Addington Simcoe became an English theologian.

== Member of Parliament ==
Simcoe entered politics in 1790. He was elected Member of Parliament for the rotten borough of St Mawes as a supporter of the government (led by William Pitt the Younger). As MP, he spoke out against Britain's involvement in the Atlantic slave trade and also proposed raising a militia force like the Queen's Rangers. He also proposed to lead an invasion of Spain. But instead, he was to be made lieutenant governor of the new loyalist province of Upper Canada. He resigned from Parliament in 1792 on taking up his new post.

== Lieutenant Governor of Upper Canada ==
The Constitutional Act 1791 divided Canada into the Provinces of Upper Canada (Ontario) and Lower Canada (Quebec). The Act established separate governments and legislative assemblies for each province. Lower Canada was the French-speaking eastern portion, which retained the French civil law and protections for the Roman Catholic Church established when Britain took over the area after its defeat of the French in the Seven Years' War. Upper Canada was the western area, newly settled after the American War of Independence. The settlers were mostly English speakers, including Loyalists from the Thirteen Colonies, and also the Six Nations of the Iroquois, who had been British allies during the war. The Crown had purchased land from the Mississauga and other First Nations to give the Loyalists land grants in partial compensation for property lost in the United States, and to help them set up new communities and develop this territory.

Simcoe was appointed Lieutenant-Governor on 12 September 1791, and left for Canada with his wife Elizabeth and daughter Sophia, leaving three daughters behind in England with their aunt. They left England in September and arrived in Canada on 11 November. Due to severe weather, the Simcoes spent the winter in Quebec City. Simcoe finally reached Kingston, Upper Canada on 24 June 1792. In a proclamation on 16 July 1792, he renamed several islands at the mouth of the archipelago at the head of the St. Lawrence River to commemorate the British generals of the Seven Years' War (Amherst Island, Carleton Island, Gage Island, Wolfe Island, and Howe Island).

Under the Constitutional Act, the provincial government consisted of the Lieutenant-Governor, an appointed Executive Council and Legislative Council, and an elected Legislative Assembly. The first meeting of the nine-member Legislative Council and sixteen-member Legislative Assembly took place at Newark (now Niagara-on-the-Lake) on 17 September 1792. Following Simcoe's work, precipitated by the Chloe Cooley incident, the Assembly passed the Act Against Slavery in 1793. The first legislation to limit slavery in the British Empire, the act banned the importation of slaves to Upper Canada and mandated that children born henceforth to female slaves would be freed upon reaching the age of 25. The Anglophone colonists of Upper Canada took pride in this distinction with respect to the French Canadians of Lower Canada; the former valued their common law legal system, as opposed to the civil law of Quebec, which had chafed them ever since 1763. This was one of the primary reasons for the partition of 1791. Simcoe collaborated extensively with his Attorney-General John White on the act.

The principles of the British Constitution do not admit of that slavery which Christianity condemns. The moment I assume the Government of Upper Canada under no modification will I assent to a law that discriminates by dishonest policy between natives of Africa, America, or Europe.

— John Graves Simcoe, Address to the Legislative Assembly

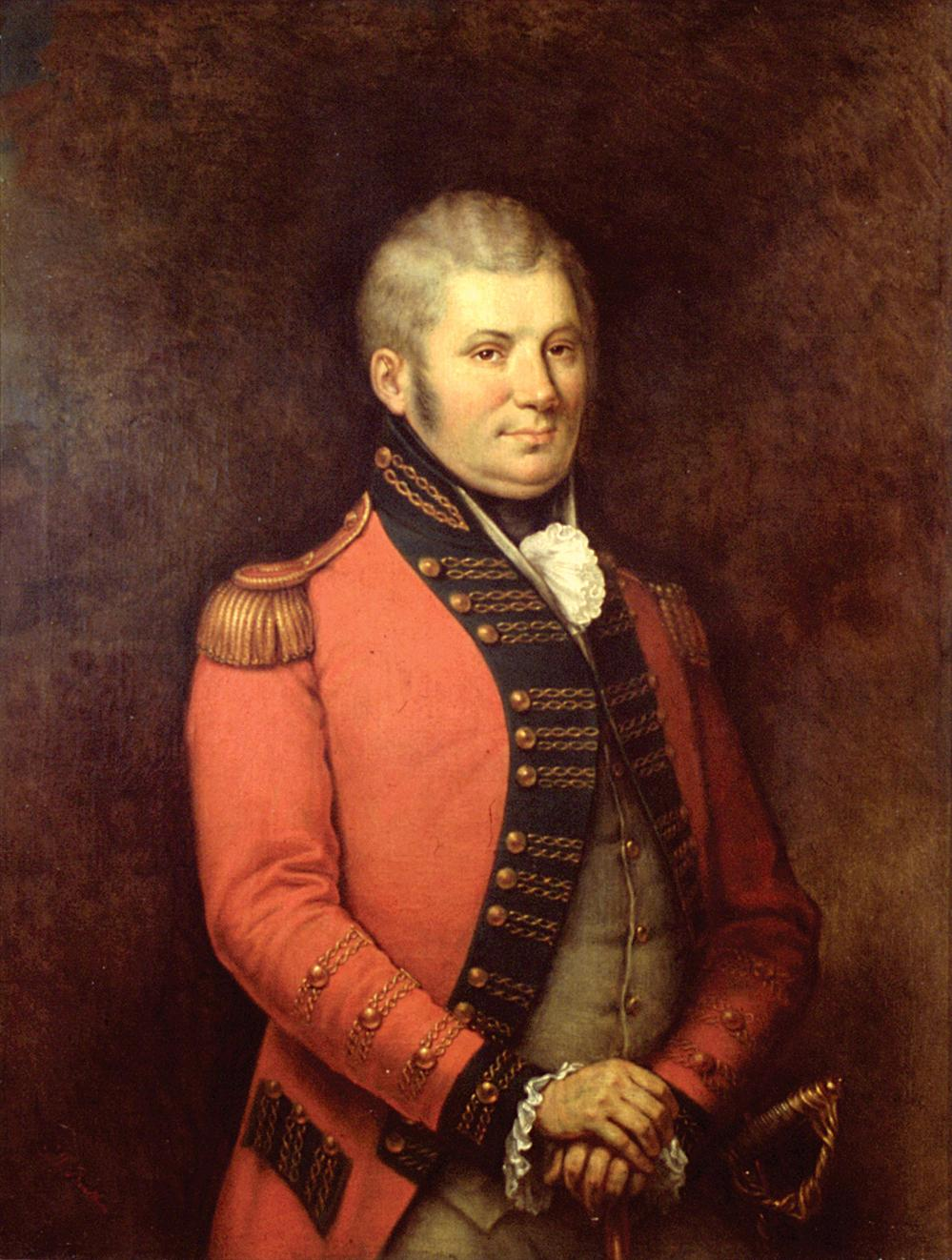
c. 1881 portrait of Simcoe by George Théodore Berthon

Simcoe realised that Newark made an unsuitable capital because it was on the Canada–US border and subject to attack. He proposed moving the capital to a more defensible position, in the middle of Upper Canada's southwestern peninsula between Lake Erie and Lake Huron. He named the new location London, and renamed the river there the Thames in anticipation of the change. Dorchester rejected this proposal, but accepted Simcoe's second choice, the present site of Toronto. Simcoe moved the capital there in 1793 and renamed the settlement York after Frederick, Duke of York, King George III's second son. The town was severely underdeveloped at the time of its founding, so he brought with him politicians, builders, Nova Scotia timbermen, and Englishmen skilled in whipsawing and cutting joists and rafters.

Simcoe began construction of two roads through Upper Canada, for defence and to encourage settlement and trade. Yonge Street (named after British Minister of War Sir George Yonge) ran north–south from York to Lake Simcoe. Soldiers of the Queen's Rangers began cutting the road in August 1793, reaching Holland Landing in 1796. Dundas Street (named for Colonial Secretary Henry Dundas) ran east–west, between York and London.

=== Conflict with the United States ===
Simcoe's priority was the Northwest Indian War between the United States and the "Western Confederacy" of Native Americans west of the Appalachian Mountains and south of the Great Lakes (the Shawnee, Miami, Wyandot, and other tribes). This conflict had begun in 1785 and was still raging when Simcoe arrived in 1792. Simcoe had hoped to form an Indian barrier state between the two countries, even though he distrusted Joseph Brant, the main Indian leader. Simcoe rejected the section of the Treaty of Paris (1783) which awarded that area to the US, because American actions had nullified the treaty. However, the French Revolutionary Wars broke out in 1793. The government in London decided to seek good terms with the United States. Simcoe was instructed to avoid giving the US reason to mistrust Britain, but, at the same time, to keep the Natives on both sides of the border friendly to Britain. The Indians asked for British military support, which was initially refused, but in 1794 Britain supplied the Indians with rifles and ammunition.

In February 1794, the governor general, Lord Dorchester, expecting the US to ally with France, said that war was likely to break out between the US and Britain before the year was out. This encouraged the Indians in their war. Dorchester ordered Simcoe to rally the Indians and arm British vessels on the Great Lakes. He also built Fort Miami (present-day Maumee, Ohio) to supply the Indians. Simcoe expelled Americans from a settlement on the southern shore of Lake Erie, which had threatened British control of the lake. US President Washington denounced the "irregular and high-handed proceeding of Mr. Simcoe." While Dorchester planned for a defensive war, Simcoe urged London to declare war: "Upper Canada is not to be defended by remaining within the boundary line." Dorchester was officially reprimanded by the Crown for his strong speech against the Americans in 1794.

The Northwest Indian War ended after the United States defeated the Indians at the Battle of Fallen Timbers. They made peace under the Treaty of Greenville. While still at war with France, Britain could not afford to antagonise the US in the Jay Treaty of 1794, and agreed to withdraw north of the Great Lakes, as agreed in the Treaty of Paris. Simcoe evacuated the frontier forts.

== Later life and death ==
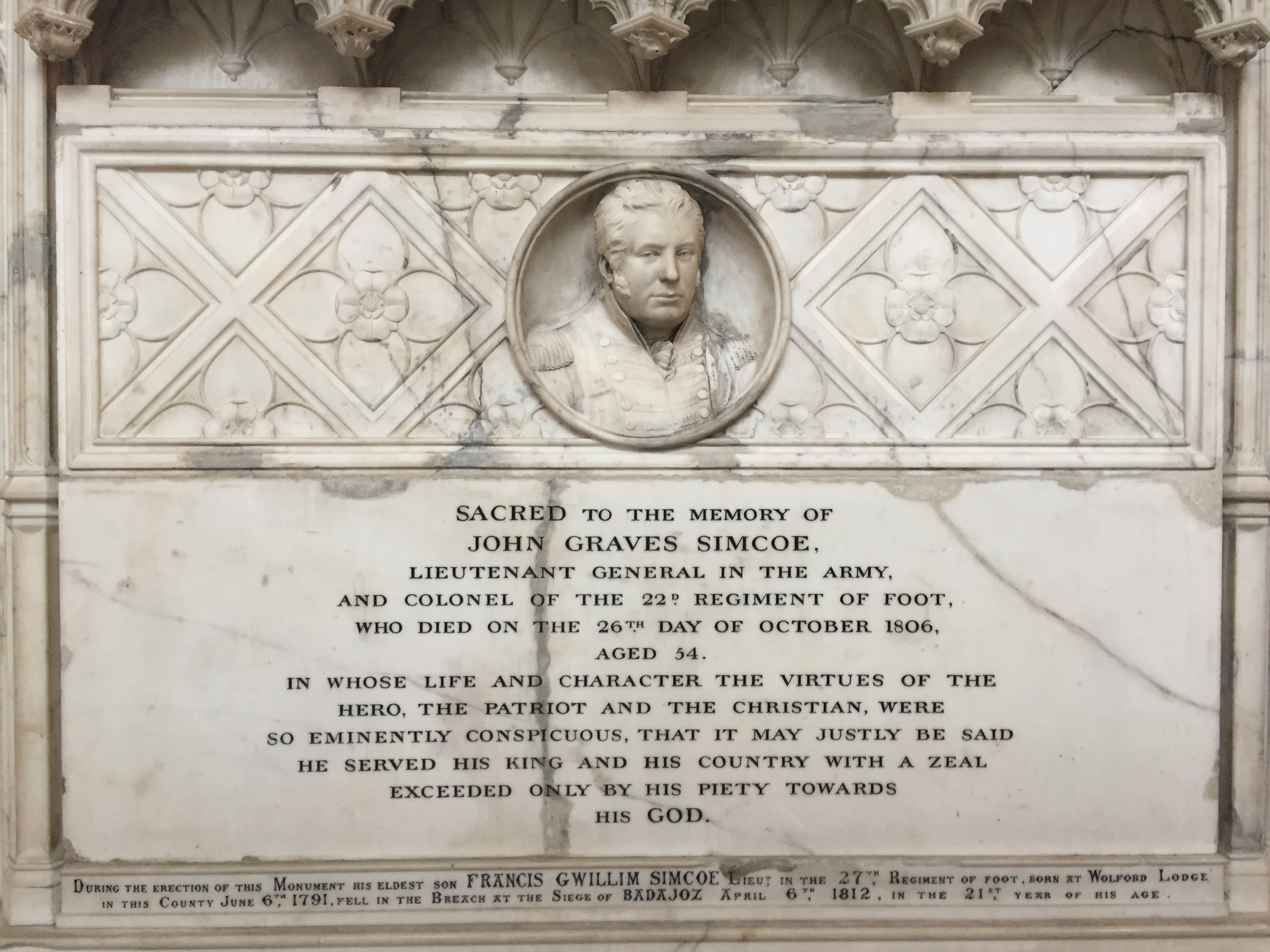
Memorial to Simcoe in Exeter Cathedral

In 1794 Simcoe was promoted to major general and in July 1796 returned to England due to suffering from gout and neuralgia. He was promoted again to lieutenant-general and appointed as the governor of British-occupied Saint-Domingue in October 1796. Britain had invaded the French colony of Saint-Domingue in September 1793 and following Simcoe's arrival in the colony to assume the role of governor local British forces were attacked by Black troops under Toussaint Louverture who were loyal to the French Republic. Though Louverture's troops failed to capture the town of Saint-Marc from the British, they succeeded in taking the town of Mirebalais and the department of Centre. Simcoe was replaced as governor in March 1797 and returned to England. Unable to return to Upper Canada, he officially resigned his office as Lieutenant Governor of Upper Canada in 1798.

Simcoe was appointed as colonel of the 81st Regiment of Foot (Loyal Lincoln Volunteers) in 1798 and switched his colonelcy to the 22nd (Cheshire) Regiment of Foot less than six months later. He was appointed as Commander-in-Chief, India in 1806 but fell ill on his way there. He returned to England and died in Exeter on 26 October. He was buried in Wolford Chapel on the Simcoe family estate near Honiton, Devon. The Ontario Heritage Foundation acquired title to the chapel in 1982. Many of Simcoe's personal effects, including his sword, sabre, and walking cane, may be viewed by appointment at the Archives of Ontario in Toronto. Elizabeth Simcoe's personal effects and hundreds of her watercolour paintings are also available there.

== Legacy ==
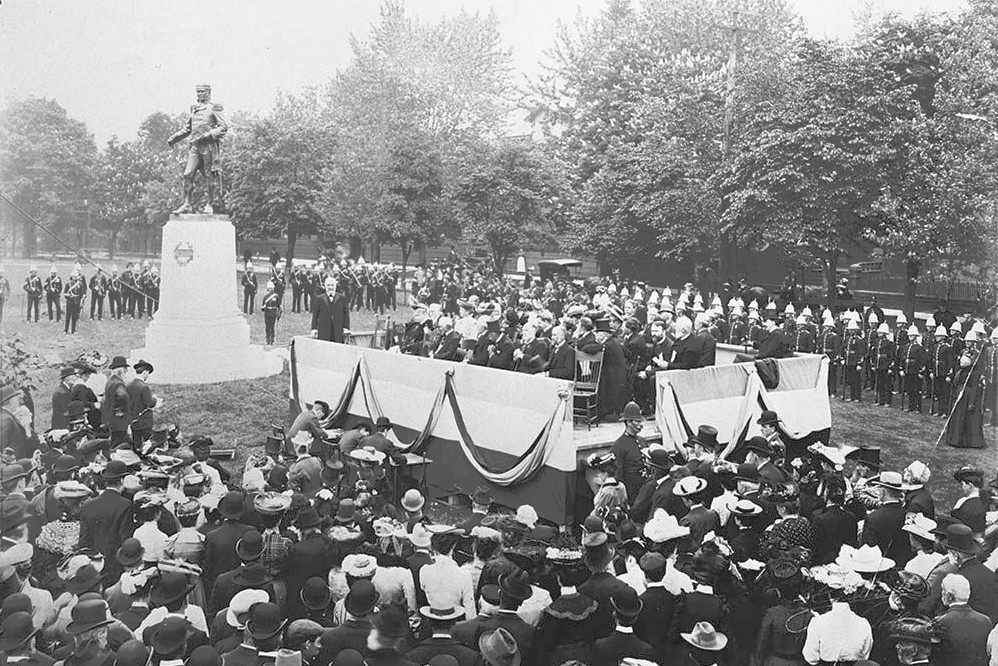
The 1903 unveiling of the statue of John Graves Simcoe at Queen's Park in Toronto

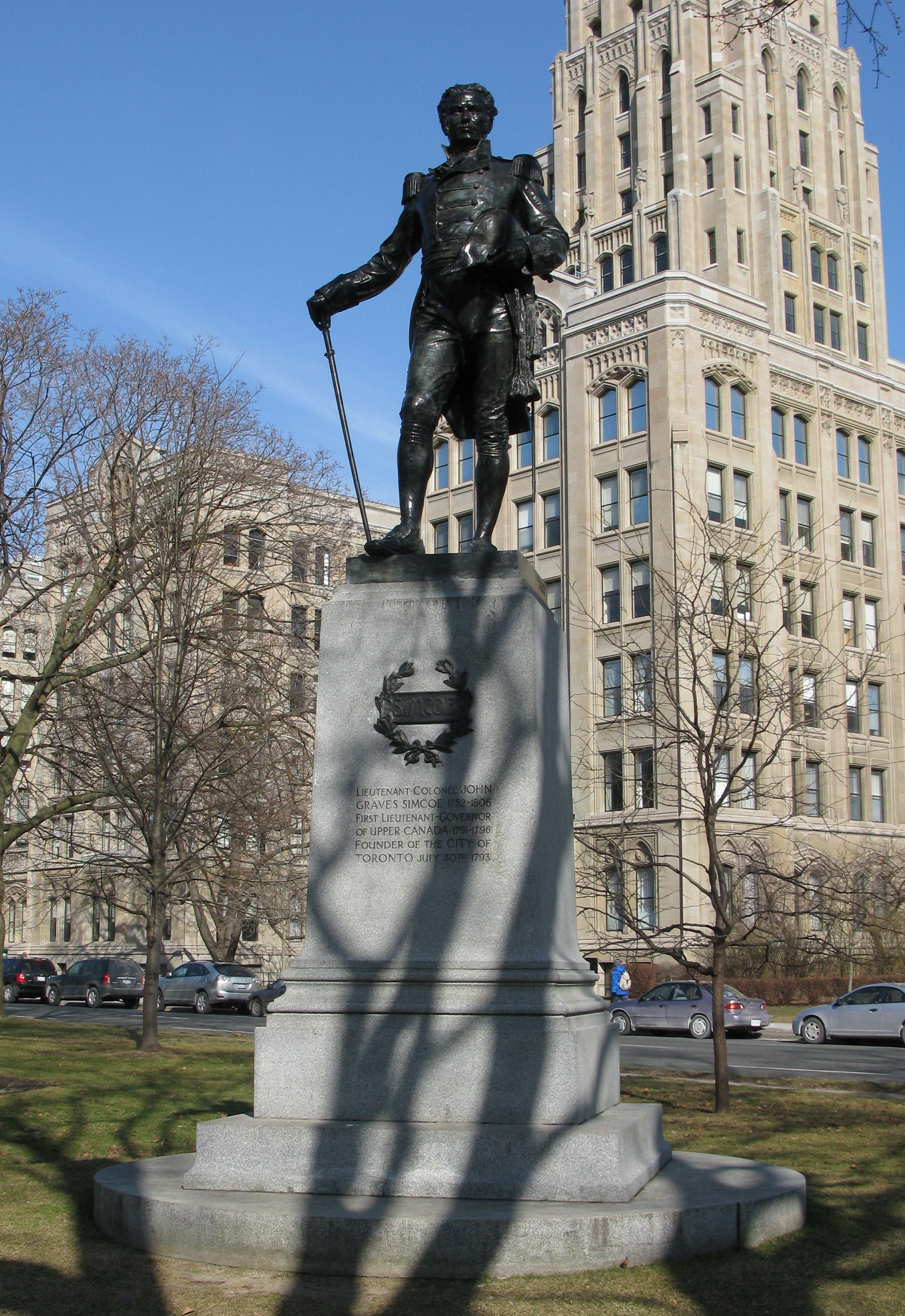
Statue of John Graves Simcoe first Lieutenant-Governor of Upper Canada by Walter Seymour Allward 1903 Queen's Park (Toronto)

- In the winter of 1779, the first known Valentine's Day letter in America was given by then Lieutenant Colonel John Simcoe to Sarah 'Sally' Townsend.
- Simcoe Street in Oyster Bay, New York, is named after him for his destruction of a vast apple orchard and reconstruction of a hill fort on the site.
- Act Against Slavery passed in 1793, leading to the abolition of slavery in Upper Canada by 1810. It was superseded by the Slavery Abolition Act 1833 that abolished slavery across the British Empire.
- Simcoe named London, Ontario and the River Thames in Upper Canada.
- He named Lake Simcoe and Simcoe County to the west and north of Lake Simcoe in honour of his father.
- Simcoe named his summer home Castle Frank for his first son, Francis Gwillim, who was preceded by eight daughters. (It is in what is now named Rosedale, a neighbourhood in downtown Toronto.)
- The Ontario Heritage Foundation placed a plaque in Exeter's cathedral precinct to commemorate his life.
- Simcoe's regiment is still called the Queen's York Rangers, now an armoured reconnaissance regiment of the Canadian Forces reserves.

Many places in Canada were named in honour of Simcoe:

- The town of Simcoe in southwestern Ontario
- The Simcoe Fairgrounds in Simcoe
- Civic Holiday, a statutory holiday celebrated throughout Canada under a variety of names by region, was established in honour of Simcoe by the Toronto City Council in 1869. Other Ontario municipalities and then other provinces soon took up the holiday as well, leading to its Canada-wide status, but without any attribution to Simcoe. In 1965, the Toronto City Council declared the holiday would henceforth be known as Simcoe Day within Toronto. Attempts have been made to have the official provincial name—still Civic Holiday—amended, but none have succeeded.
- Governor Simcoe Secondary School in St. Catharines, Ontario
- Governor Simcoe Public School. Grades K – 8, in London, Ontario. The now closed and demolished school was located at the corner of Simcoe and Clarence Streets.
- Three parallel streets in downtown Toronto, John Street, Graves Street, and Simcoe Street, are all located near the fort where Simcoe lived during his early years in York and were named for him. Graves Street was later renamed Duncan Street.
- Simcoe Street, Simcoe Street United Church, and Simcoe Hall Settlement House in Oshawa.
- Simcoe Street in New Westminster and Simcoe Park was named by Colonel Moody in reference to the surveying of the area after the city of Toronto.
- Simcoe Street, Simcoe Street School, and the Simcoe Street School Tigers Bantam Baseball Team of Niagara Falls
- Simcoe Island, located near Kingston, Ontario
- Simcoe Hall, located on the St. George campus of the University of Toronto
- John Graves Simcoe Armoury, located on Industrial Parkway in Aurora, Ontario
- Governors Road, a named section of Ontario Highway 99 running between Dundas, Ontario and Paris, Ontario

Two places have been named for Simcoe with the title Lord, even though Simcoe was never a Lord in his lifetime:

- Lord Simcoe Drive in Brampton, Ontario
- Lord Simcoe Hotel, which operated from 1956 to 1981

Captain John Kennaway Simcoe, the last member of the Simcoe family, died without issue in 1891 and was survived by his widow beyond 1911.

=== In popular culture ===
A fictionalised version of John Graves Simcoe is a primary antagonist in the 2014–2017 AMC drama Turn: Washington's Spies, portrayed by Samuel Roukin. He is portrayed in the series as a cruel and ruthless sociopath.

Despite the strong fictionalisation of the namesake TV-show character, several biographical aspects of the latter's historical counterpart appear to have been adapted for and transferred onto the fictional character Edmund Hewlett. For instance, Hewlett's romantic ambitions regarding Anna Strong in the series resemble Simcoe's courtship of Sarah Townsend, sister of Culper Ring spy Robert Townsend, for whom he wrote a poem that is thought to be the first verifiable valentine on the North American continent. It is presumed that Townsend, much like the fictionalised portrayal of Anna Strong on Turn, may have gathered and passed on intelligence gleaned from her unsuspecting suitor to the Culper Ring.

Similarly, Hewlett's close bond with his horse Bucephalus (presumably named after Bucephalus, the horse of Alexander the Great) which overarches all four seasons, appears to have been inspired by history: in 1783, John Graves Simcoe sent a series of letters to New York to find the horse he had ridden on campaign, Salem. Salem was located, and Simcoe subsequently paid the considerable sum of £40 to have him shipped to England and thus returned to him. Shortly before his departure to Upper Canada, almost a decade later, it is reported he was greatly concerned for Salem's welfare in his absence, therefore making arrangements for the latter's care and upkeep.

== Footnotes ==
Parliament of Great Britain
Preceded by Sir William Young; Hugh Boscawen	Member of Parliament for St Mawes; 1790–1792	Succeeded by Sir William Young; Thomas Calvert
Government offices
New title under Governor in Chief of British North America; Guy Carleton, 1st Baron Dorchester	Lieutenant Governor of Upper Canada; 1791–1796	Succeeded by Peter Russell
Military offices
Preceded by Sir Hew Dalrymple	Colonel of the 81st Regiment of Foot; 1798	Succeeded by Sir Henry Johnson
Preceded by William Crosbie	Colonel of the 22nd (the Cheshire) Regiment of Foot; 1798–1806	Succeeded by Sir James Henry Craig
