= Judaicum =

Judaicum may refer to:

- The Institutum Judaicum was a special academic course for Protestant theologians who desired to prepare themselves for missionary work among Jews
- Bellum Judaicum is a book written by the 1st century Jewish historian Josephus

== See also ==
- Judaicus (disambiguation)
- Judaico (disambiguation)
