= Elizabeth Simcoe =

English artist (1762–1850)

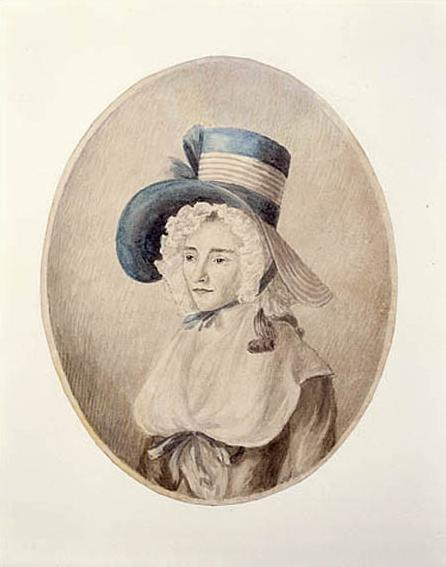
- Portrait by Mary Anne Burges, 1790
- Born: Elizabeth Posthuma Gwillim; 22 September 1762; Aldwincle, Northamptonshire, England
- Died: 17 January 1850 (aged 87); Honiton, Devon, England
- Spouse: John Graves Simcoe (m. 1782; died 1806)
- Children: 11

Dame Elizabeth Posthuma Simcoe (22 September 1762 – 17 January 1850) was an English artist and diarist in colonial Canada. Her husband, John Graves Simcoe, was the first Lieutenant Governor of Upper Canada. Her diary gives an account of Canadian life.

== Biography ==
She was born Elizabeth Posthuma Gwillim to Lt Col. Thomas Gwillim and Elizabeth Spinckes in the village of Aldwincle, Northamptonshire, England. Her father died before her birth and her mother shortly afterwards. After her baptism, on the same day as her mother's burial, she was taken into the care of her mother's younger sister, Margaret. In commemoration of her posthumous birth, Elizabeth was given the middle name Posthuma. Her aunt and adoptive mother, Margaret, married Admiral Samuel Graves on 14 June 1769 and Elizabeth grew up at Graves's estate, Hembury Fort near Honiton in Devon. Gwillim was one of a group of friends that included Mary Anne Burges in Honiton.

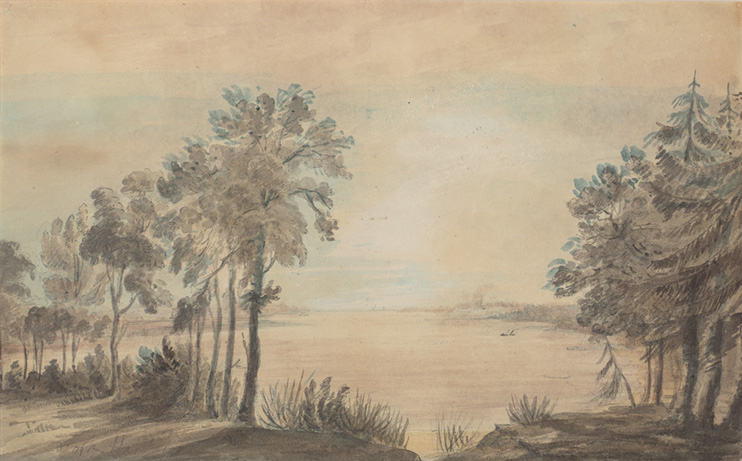
A 1793 watercolour painting by Simcoe of York Harbour before settlement. York would become the city of Toronto

On 30 December 1782, Elizabeth married John Graves Simcoe, Admiral Graves's godson. Between the years 1784 and 1804, they had eleven children, among them Francis Simcoe, after whom they named Castle Frank. Nine survived to adulthood; Katherine, their only child to be born in Upper Canada, and John Cornwall Simcoe died in infancy. Katherine is buried at Fort York Garrison.

Elizabeth was a wealthy heiress, who acquired a 5,000-acre (2,000 ha) estate near Honiton, Devon, and built Wolford Lodge, which remained the Simcoe family seat until 1923. She is buried at Wolford Chapel.

== Legacy ==
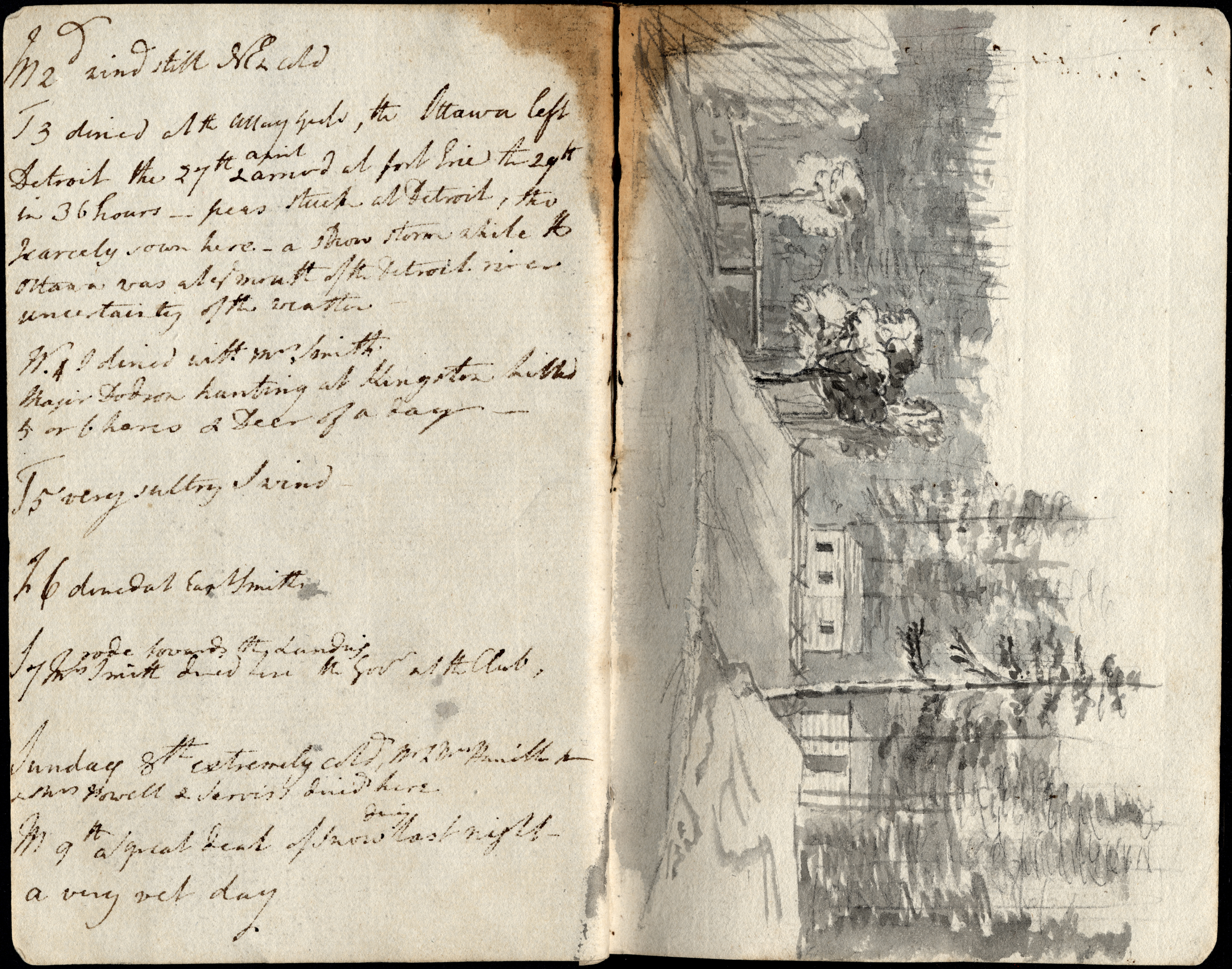
Pages 6–7 of Elizabeth Simcoe's diary created between 1795 and 1796 from the Simcoe Family Fonds at the Archives of Ontario

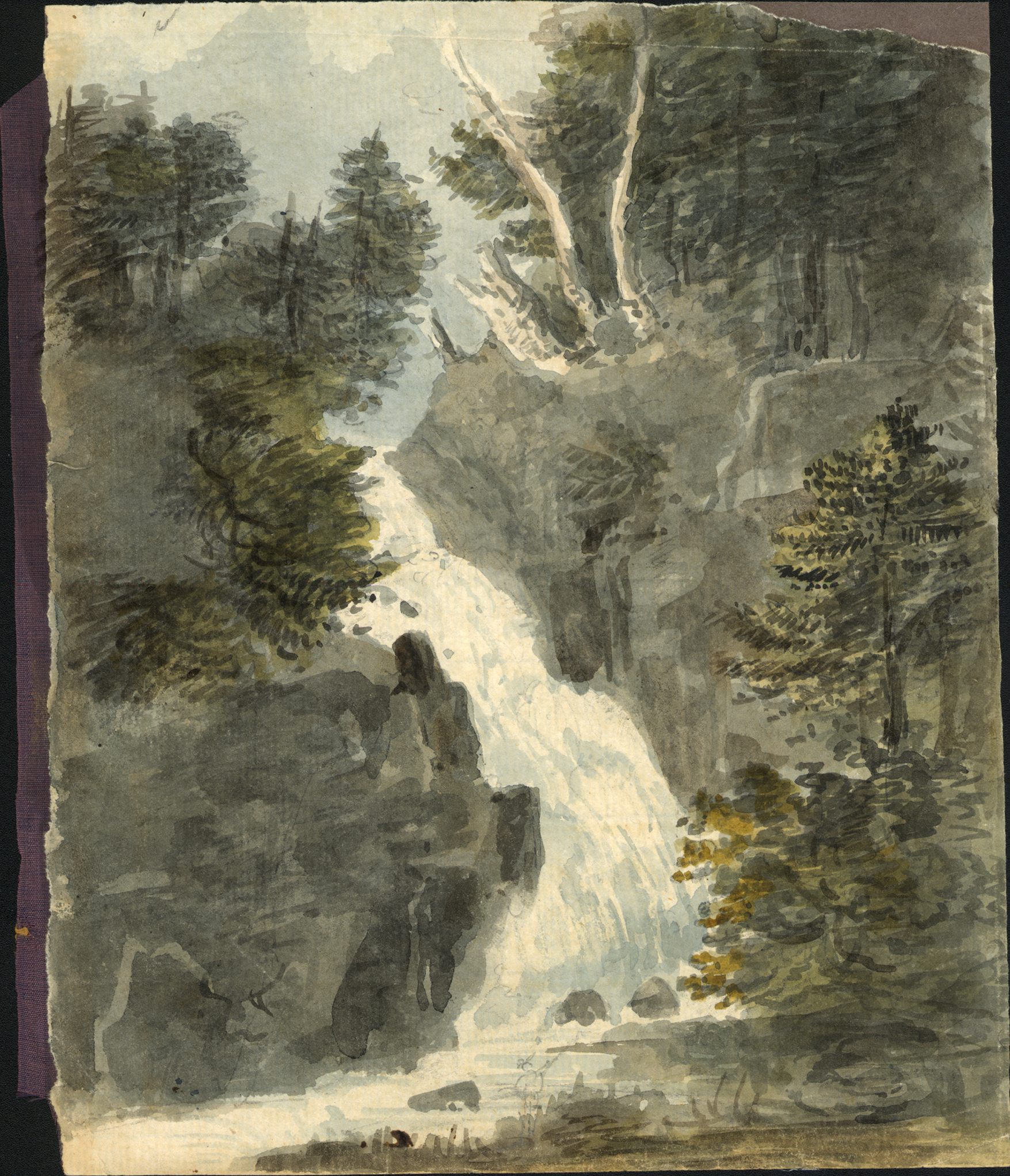
A watercolour painting by Elizabeth Simcoe created in [April 1792?] depicting a cascade in Wolfe's Cove from the Simcoe Family Fonds

Elizabeth Simcoe's diary provides a valuable impression of life in colonial Ontario. First published in 1911, there was a subsequent transcription published in 1965 and a paperback version at the turn of the 21st century, over 200 years after she wrote it. She also left a series of 595 watercolours that depict the town of York, Upper Canada. She proposed the naming of Scarborough Township, an eastern Toronto district, after Scarborough, North Yorkshire. The townships of North, East and West Gwillimbury, just south of Lake Simcoe, Ontario, are also named after her family. The Township of Whitchurch, today the town of Whitchurch–Stouffville, Ontario, honours her ancestral home, Whitchurch, Herefordshire.

In December 2007, a statue of Elizabeth Gwillim Simcoe was raised in the town of Bradford West Gwillimbury, when it commemorated the 150th anniversary of its incorporation. The statue stands in a small park in front of the Bradford post office, at the corner of John Street West and Barrie Street.

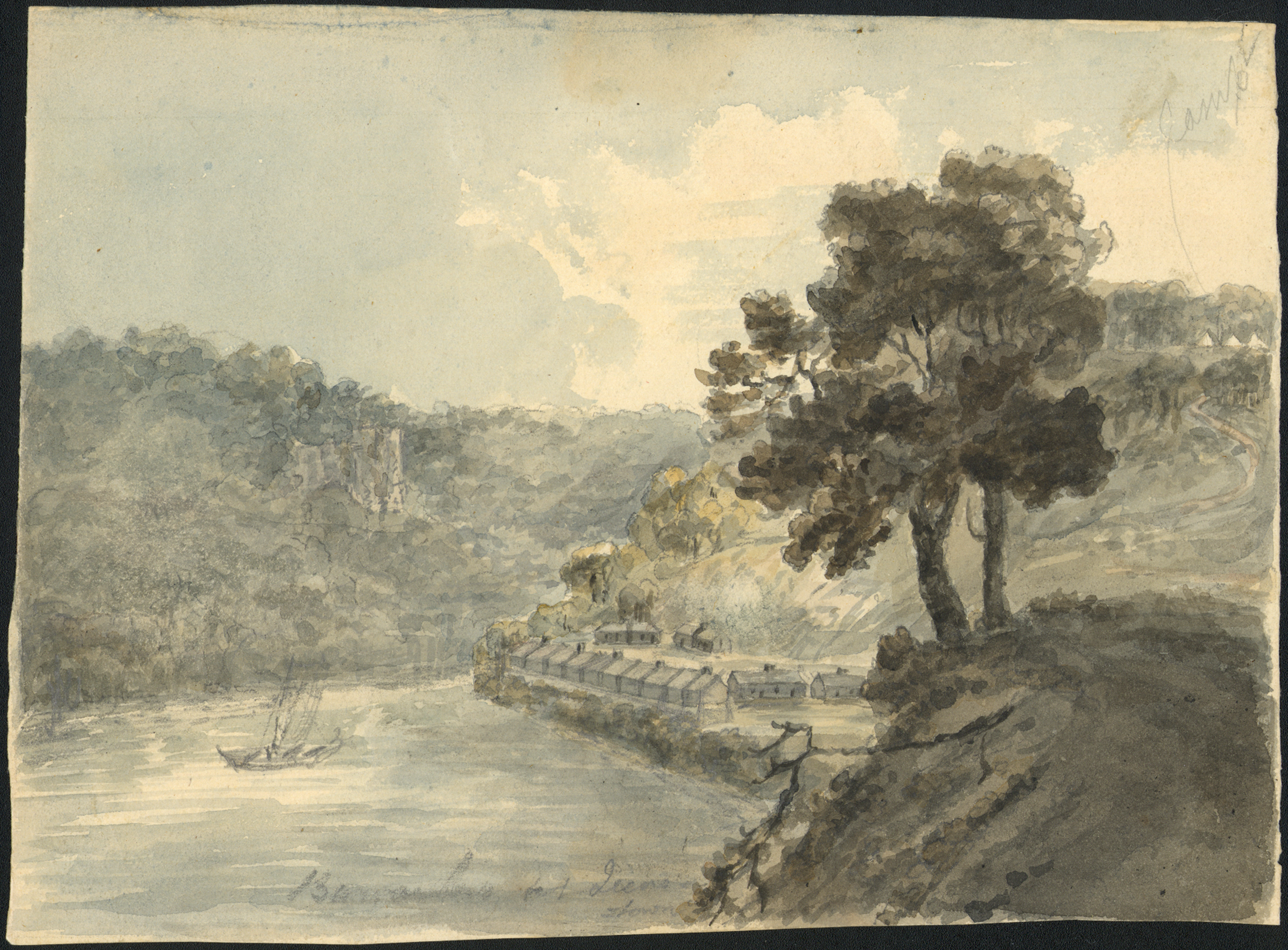
[Ca. 1792] watercolour painting by Elizabeth Simcoe depicting the barracks at Queenston from the Simcoe Family Fonds

In 2015, her work was included in The Artist Herself: Self-Portraits by Canadian Historical Artists, an exhibition co-curated by Alicia Boutilier and Tobi Bruce who also co-edited the book/catalogue.
