= Judaico =

Judaico may refer to:

- The Oath More Judaico or Jewish Oath was a special form of oath that Jews were required to take in European courts of law until the 20th century
- De bello Judaico, an alternative title to the book The Wars of the Jews
- The Museu Judaico de Belmonte is a Portuguese Jewish museum in Belmonte

== See also ==
- Judaicus (disambiguation)
- Judaicum (disambiguation)
