= George Fyler Townsend =

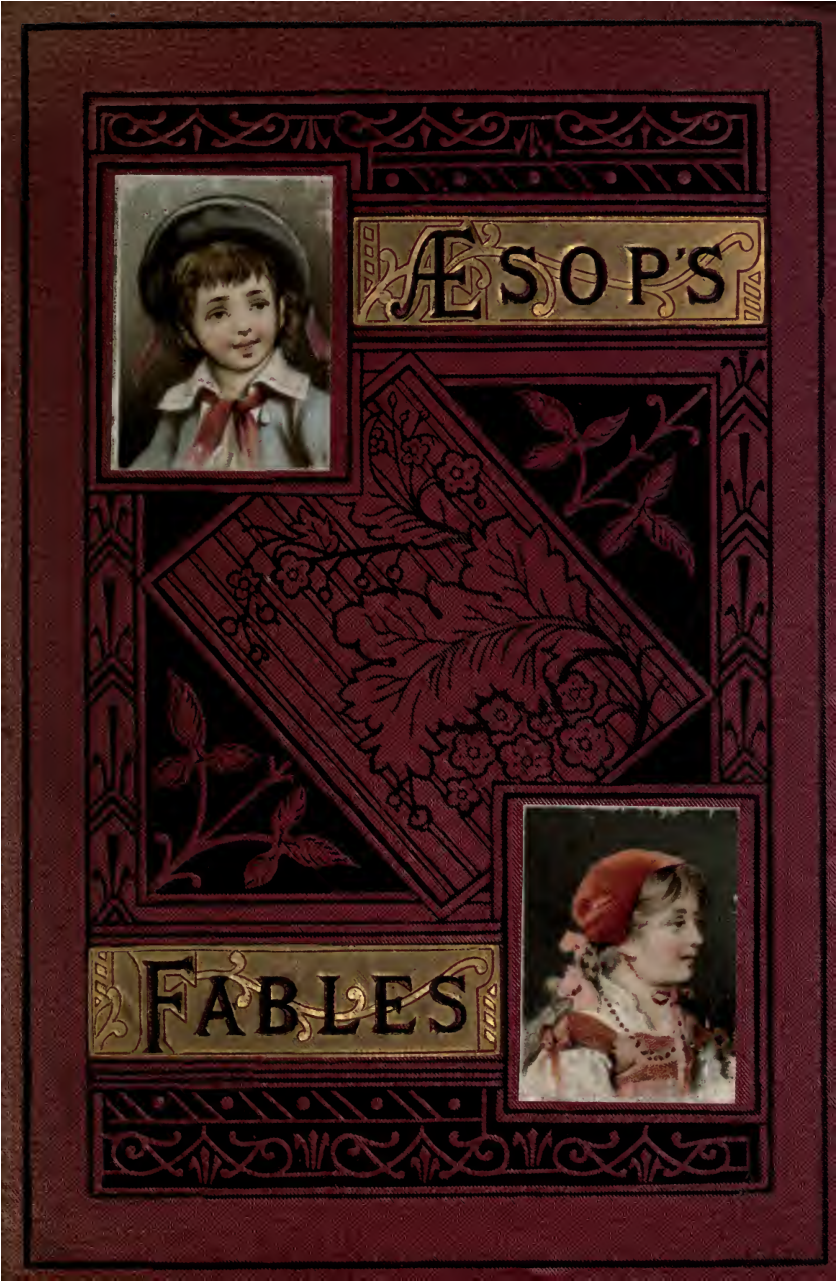
Cover illustration to Three hundred Aesop's fables

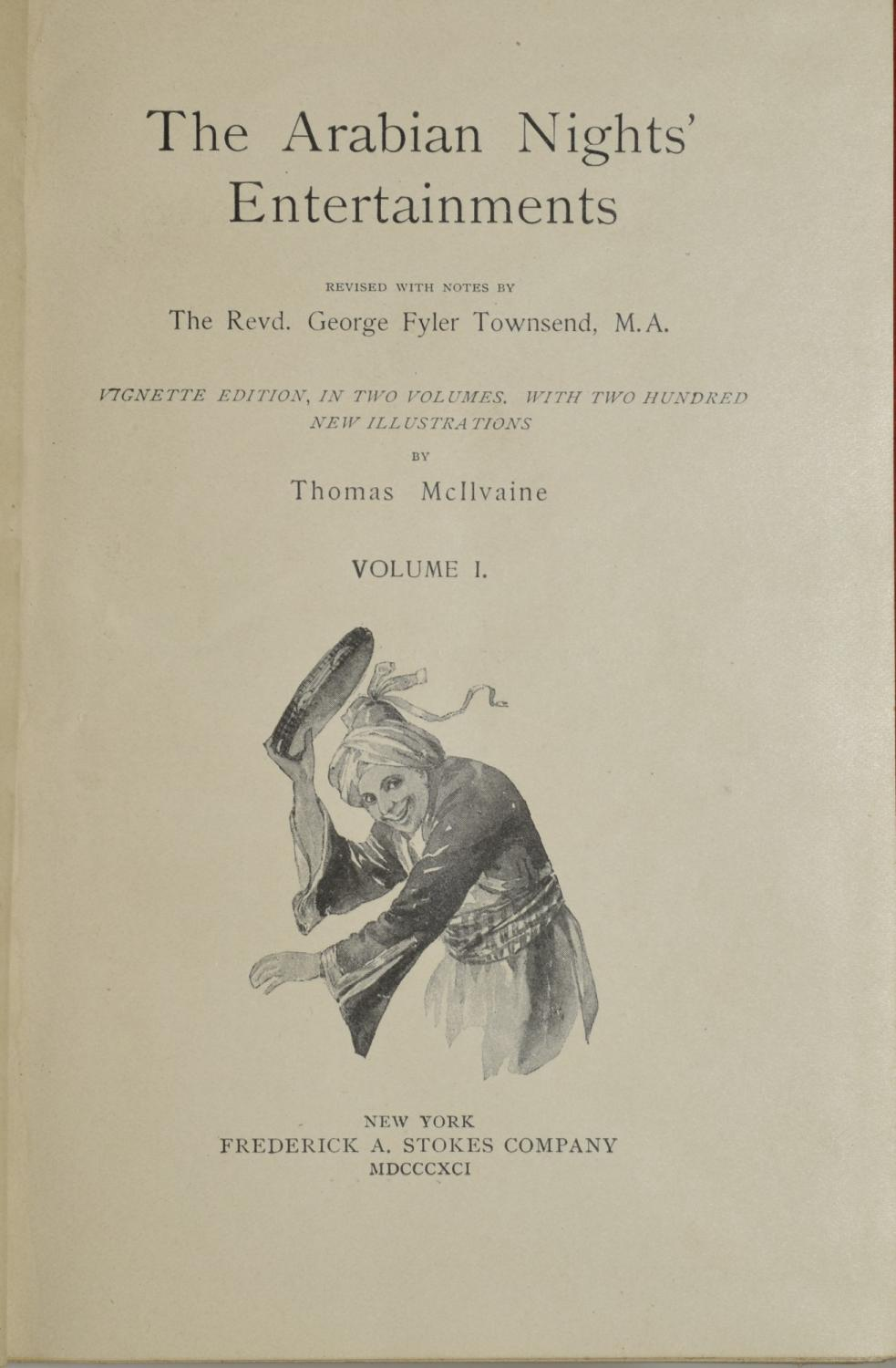
Frontispiece illustration of The Arabian Nights' Entertainments

George Fyler Townsend (1814–1900) was the British translator of the standard English edition of Aesop's Fables.

He was the son of George Townsend and was educated at Harrow School and Trinity College, Cambridge -DCL 1876. He was Vicar of Brantingham, Yorks 1842–1857, of Leominster 1857-1862 and of St Michael's, Burleigh Street, Westminster 1862–1894.

He was the last Clerical proctor for granting Marriage Licences in Doctors Commons and assumed the name "Townesend" in 1882.

Although there are more modern collections and translations, Townsend's volume of 350 fables introduced the practice of stating a succinct moral at the conclusion of each story, and continues to be influential. Several editions were published in his lifetime, and others since. In 1860, Townsend also published a revised edition of The Arabian Nights, "mostly founded on the version of Dr Jonathan Scott".

In 1872, Townsend published, under the auspices of the Society for Promoting Christian Knowledge, a volume entitled 'The Sea Kings of the Mediterranean'. This is an account of the Knights of Malta, from their beginnings up to Townsend's own time. The dedication is addressed to his 'Dear Boys', 'in the hope that they will hate all that is low and base, and love all that is noble, great and good.'

Townsend also published 'The Town and Borough of Leominster' (Leominster: S. Partridge, and London: Arthur Hall & Co., date not given), written about 1861 while he was vicar of Leominster in Herefordshire.

His son was surgeon Stephen Townesend.
