= William Drummond of Logiealmond =

Scottish diplomat

Sir William James Charles Maria Drummond of Logiealmond FRS FRSE DCL (bapt. 26 September 1769 – 29 March 1828) was a Scottish diplomat and Member of Parliament, poet and philosopher. His book Academical Questions (1805) is arguably important in the development of the ideas of English Romantic poet Percy Bysshe Shelley.

Drummond lived in London from 1809 and died in Rome on 29 March 1828.

== Life ==
He was born in Perthshire, the son of John Drummond of Perth and educated at both St Andrew's University and Oxford University.

In 1798, he was elected a Fellow of the Royal Society of Edinburgh. His proposers being Dugald Stewart, Alexander Keith and John Playfair. He was elected a Fellow of the Royal Society of London the following year.

== Career ==
In 1795, he was MP for St. Mawes, and in the elections of 1796 and 1801 was returned for Lostwithiel. These were both rotten boroughs in Cornwall. He was elected a Fellow of the Royal Society in 1799. He became sworn as a Privy Counsellor in 1801, and left Parliament as a diplomat, as Envoy to the court of Naples.

In 1803, he became British Ambassador to the Ottoman Empire. Appointed by the Levant Company on 14 January 1803, he arrived at the Dardanelles the following May. He was there for less than a year and then he returned to England in 1804. From 1806 to 1809 he served as Envoy to the Court of Naples for a second time. He was knighted in 1813 or 1814.

== The Argument of Academical Questions ==
The title of Drummond's book refers to the later Platonic Academy, which was, in fact, not so much Platonist as Sceptical in orientation, based on the work of Pyrrho the Sceptic and later followers of Pyrrho such as Carneades. Academical Questions is a work in the Sceptic tradition, in this case influenced by the Sceptical Scottish philosopher David Hume.

According to C.E. Pulos's 1954 book, The Deep Truth: A Study of Shelley's Scepticism, Drummond uses Sceptical Humean ideas in an attempt to refute the British philosophy predominant in his day, the Common Sense ideas of Thomas Reid and his followers. These had been enunciated first in Reid's An Enquiry into the Human Mind (1765). The quotation, "He, who will not reason is a bigot; he who cannot, is a fool; and he, who dares not, is a slave" has been credited to Drummond.

== Other writings ==
His Oedipus Judaicus references the Oedipus Aegyptiacus of Athanasius Kircher, and was printed for private circulation. It was reprinted in 1866, having proved highly controversial (introduction to 1986 reprint by James P. Carley). It interprets passages from the Book of Genesis (in particular the Chedorlaomer story), and the Book of Joshua, in allegorical fashion, with a detailed argument based on astrology.

== Works ==
- A Review of the Government of Sparta and Athens (1794)
- Philosophical sketches of the principles of society and government (1795)
- The Satires of Persius Translated: with Notes (1799)
- Academical Questions (1805)
- Herculanensia (1810) with Robert Walpole
- Memoir on the Antiquity of the Zodiacs of Esneh and Dendera (1821)
- Oedipus Judaicus (1811, privately circulated and reprinted in 1866)
- Odin (1818), poem
- Origines, or Remarks on the Origin of several Empires, States, and Cities (1824–29)

== Notes ==
Parliament of Great Britain
Preceded by Thomas Calvert; Sir William Young	Member of Parliament for St Mawes; 1795–1796; With: Sir William Young	Succeeded by George Nugent; Sir William Young
Preceded by George Smith; Reginald Pole-Carew	Member of Parliament for Lostwithiel; 1796–1800; With: Hans Sloane	Succeeded by Parliament of the United Kingdom
Parliament of the United Kingdom
Preceded by Parliament of Great Britain	Member of Parliament for Lostwithiel; 1801–1802; With: Hans Sloane	Succeeded by Hans Sloane; William Dickinson
Diplomatic posts
Preceded by Sir Arthur Paget	Ambassador to the Kingdom of Naples; 1801–1803	Succeeded by Hugh Elliot
Preceded by Earl of Elgin	Ambassador to the Ottoman Empire; 1803–1804	Succeeded by Charles Arbuthnot
Preceded by Gen. Henry Edward Fox	Ambassador to the Kingdom of Naples; 1806–1809	Succeeded by Lord Amherst
