= Hugh Boscawen (died 1795) =

British politician and office holder

Hugh Boscawen (died 1795) was a British politician and office holder who sat in the House of Commons from 1774 to 1790.

Boscawen was one of three illegitimate children of Hugh Boscawen, 2nd Viscount Falmouth. He married Anne and had three sons and a daughter. He was appointed Clerk of the Cheque to the Yeomen of the Guard in February 1772, while his father was Captain of the Yeomen of the Guard and held the post until his death.

In the 1774 general election Boscawen was returned unopposed as Member of Parliament for St Mawes where the Boscawens had an interest. He was returned unopposed again in 1780. His father died on 4 February 1782 and he inherited £30,000, the manor of St. Antony in Cornwall, and the Boscawen interest at St Mawes. He was returned unopposed on his own interest in 1784 but then apparently sold his interest at St Mawes to the Marquess of Buckingham, who controlled the other seat in the borough. It was expected in 1788 that his tenure of St. Mawes would expire at the end of the parliament as Pitt had promised him the office of Knight Marshal, and he did not stand in 1790. There is no record of his having spoken in the House.

Boscawen was duly appointed Knight Marshal of the Household and Marshal of the Marshalsea in 1792 on the death of Sir Sidney Meadows. He died on 4 September 1795.

Parliament of Great Britain
Preceded by James Edward Colleton; George Boscawen	Member of Parliament for St Mawes; 1774–1790; With: Viscount Clare (Sir) William Young	Succeeded by (Sir) William Young; Colonel John Graves Simcoe
Court offices
Preceded by Sir Sidney Meadows	Knight Marshal; 1792–1795	Succeeded by Sir James Burges, Bt
