= Oedipus Judaicus =

1811 book by William Drummond

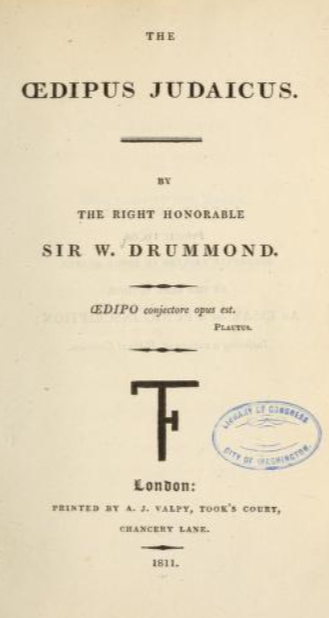
- Title page for Oedipus Judaicus (1811)
- Author: William Drummond
- Publication date: 1811

Oedipus Judaicus by William Drummond was first published in 1811 in a limited edition of 200 copies. The book was originally intended for use in a scholastic setting in an attempt to protect Drummond's political career from ridicule.

The work is a commentary on a supposed astrological allegory in the Old Testament of the Bible, patterned after the Oedipus Aegyptiacus of Kircher. In the book, Drummond seeks possible sources of the Biblical writings, from the Temple of Denderah to parallels with the Roman gods, dealing primarily with the 49th chapter of Genesis and the book of Joshua to draw his conclusions. It contains possibly the first reference to the Age of Aquarius in an English publication, but uses a different terminology as the following extract indicates"

"Thus the Sun at the vernal equinox passed from the sign of Taurus to that of Aries, which became in its turn the first of the zodiacal constellations ."

The book was reprinted in 1866 and again in 1986, and is again in print.

== External articles and references ==
- The Oedipus Judaicus. Entire text at Google Books

Specific
