= List of mountains of Dominica =

Dominica is an island-nation in the Caribbean Lesser Antilles. The highest mountain peak on Dominica, at 4,747 ft, is Morne Diablotins, which is also the second highest mountain in the Lesser Antilles.

Mountain	Height (feet)
Bellevue Mountain	1,903
Deux Jardins	1,070
Mang Peak	
Morne aux Diables	2,816
Morne Balvine	404
Morne Cola Anglais	2,331
Morne Concorde	2,027
Morne Couronne	2,312
Morne Diablotins	4,747
Morne Espagnol	1,198
Morne Fraser	2,272
Morne Gouveneue	
Morne Los Resources	3,798
Morne Macaque	4,006
Morne Negres Marrons	2,245
Morne Plat Pays	2,636
Morne Trois Pitons	4,550
Morne Turner	2,341
Mosquito Mountain	3,547
Watt Mountain	4,017
Morne Nicholls	3,168
Morne Anglais	3,683

== See also ==
- List of volcanoes in Dominica
- Mountain peaks of the Caribbean
