= List of volcanoes in the Caribbean =

This is a list of active and extinct volcanoes in the Caribbean, listed by country or territory.

== List ==
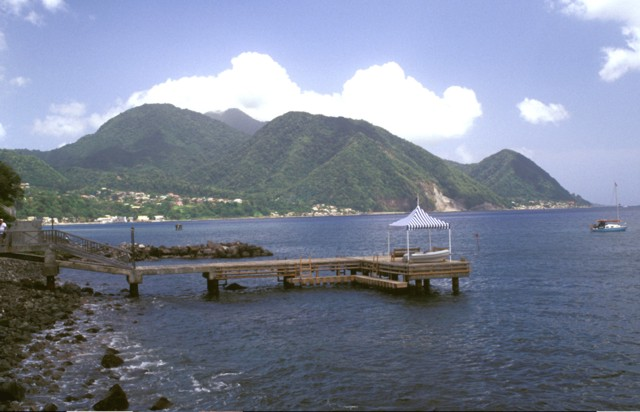
Morne Plat Pays, Dominica

=== Dominica ===
- Morne aux Diables ("Devil's Peak")
- Morne Diablotins ("Diablotin Mountain")
- Morne Plat Pays
- Morne Trois Pitons
- Morne Watt ("Mount Watt")

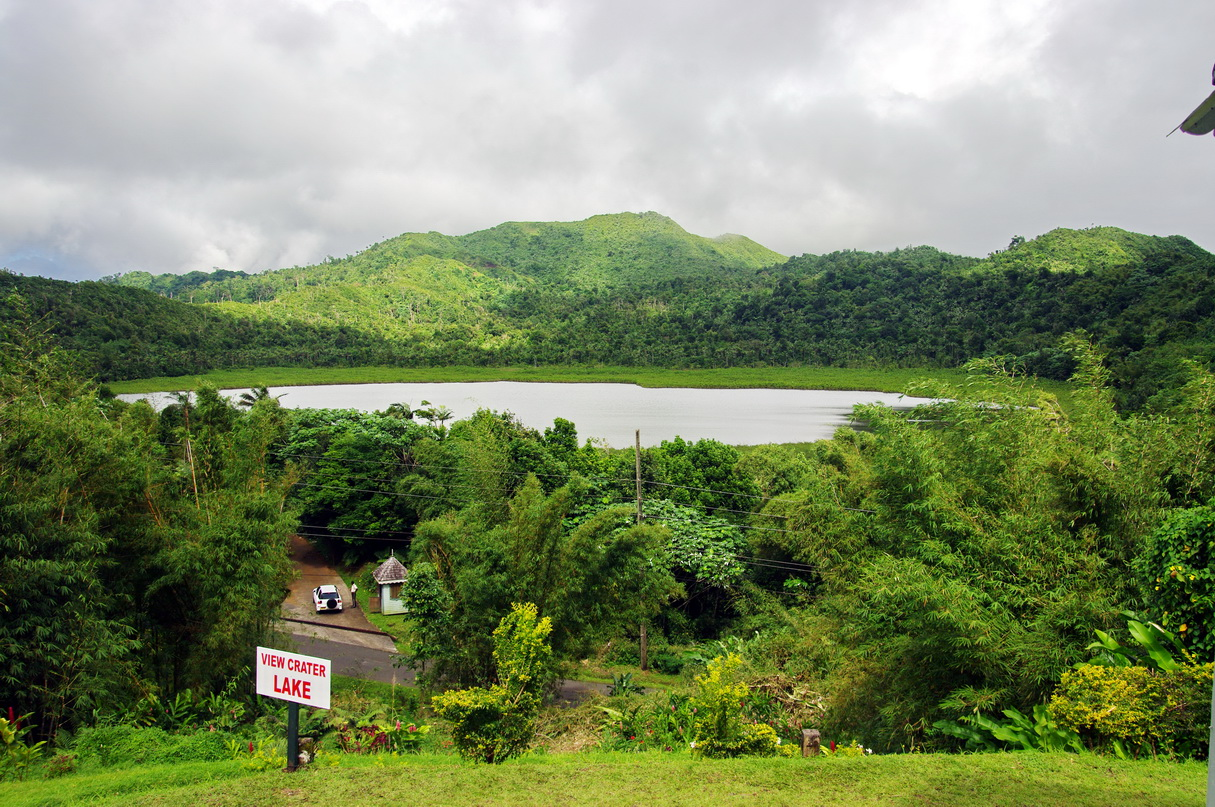
Grand Etang Lake, Grenada

=== Grenada ===
- Grand Etang (a crater lake)
- Kick 'em Jenny
- Mount Saint Catherine

=== Guadeloupe ===
- La Grande Soufrière

=== Honduras (Bay Islands) ===
- Isla el Tigre
- Isla Zacate Grande
- Lake Yojoa
- Utila Island

=== Martinique ===
- Mont Pelée (Mount Pelée)

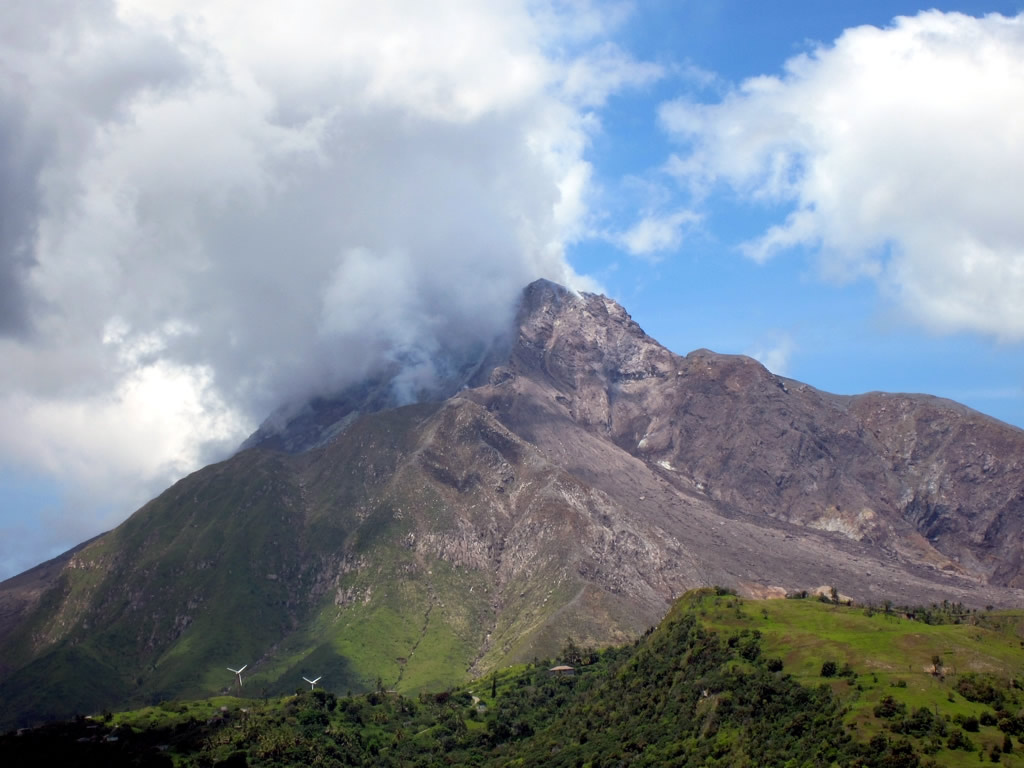
Soufriere Hills Volcano, Montserrat

=== Montserrat ===
- Centre Hills
- Silver Hills
- Soufrière Hills
- South Soufriere Hills

=== Panama ===
- Barú
- El Valle
- La Yeguada

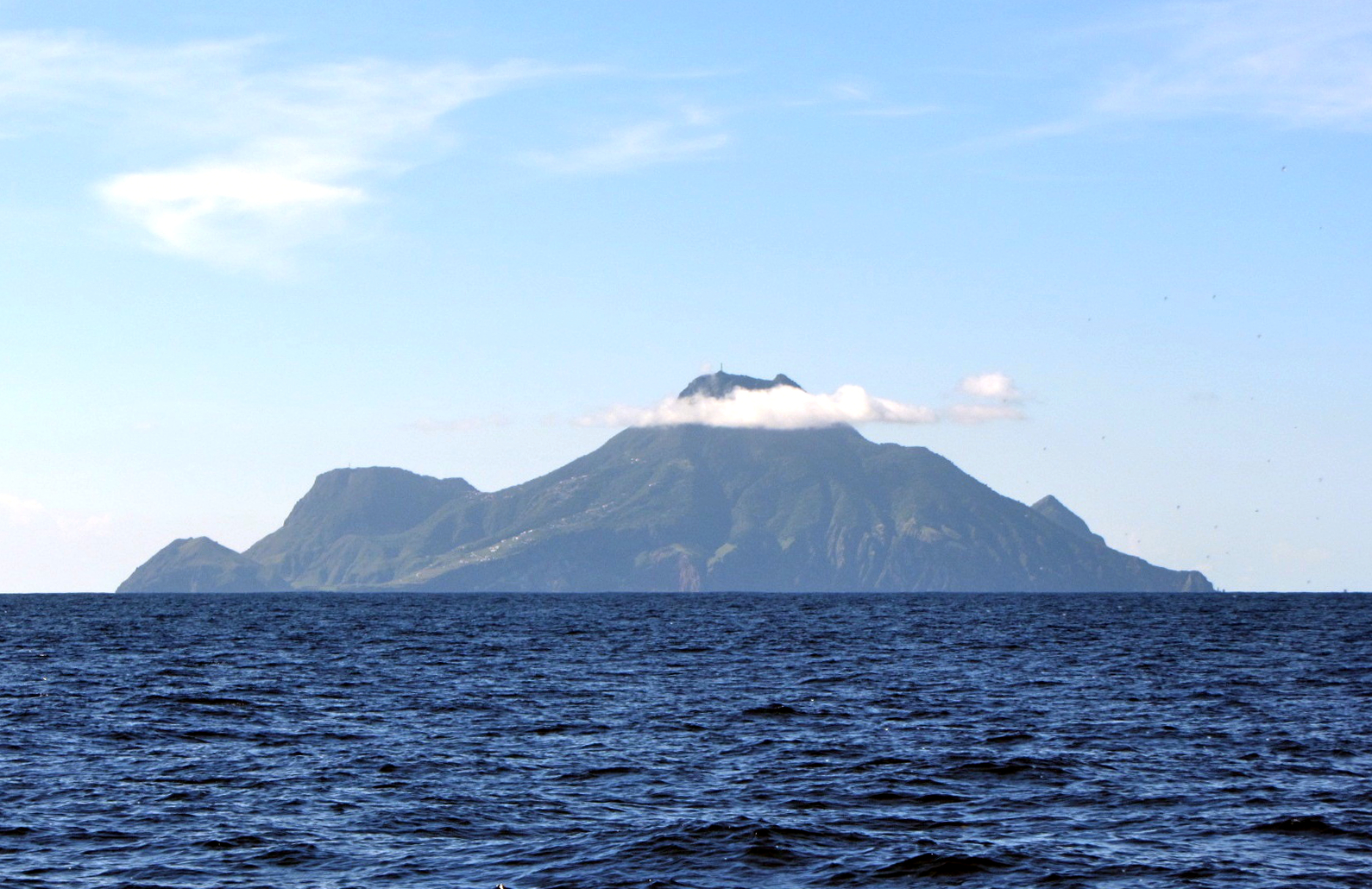
Mount Scenery, Saba

=== Saba ===
- Mount Scenery

=== Saint Kitts and Nevis ===
- Mount Liamuiga
- Nevis Peak

=== Saint Lucia ===
- Qualibou

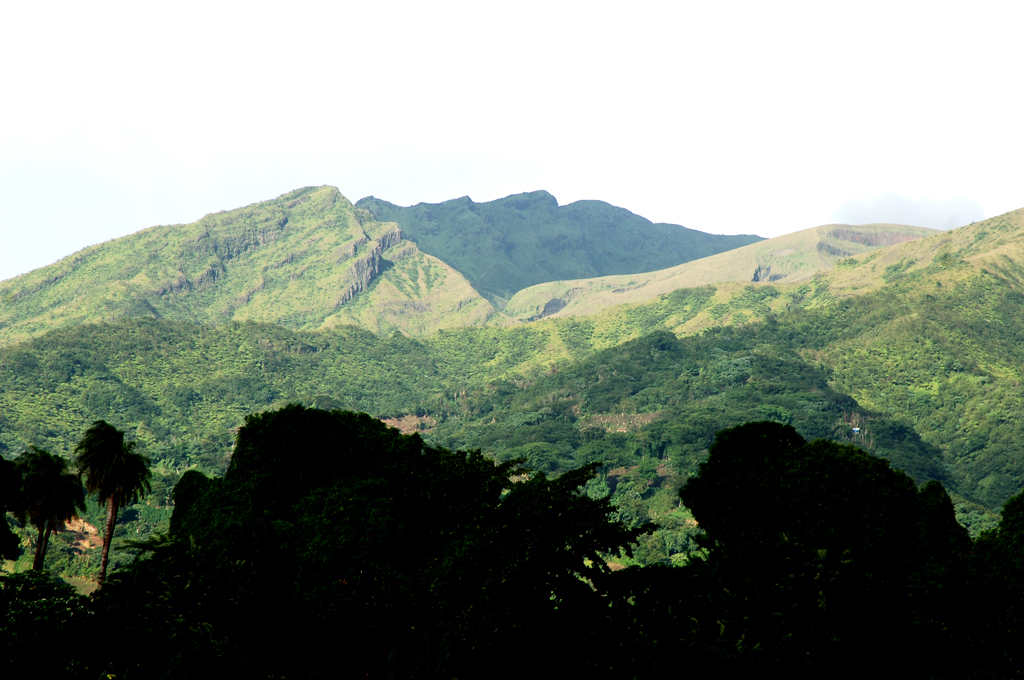
La Soufrière, Saint Vincent

=== Saint Vincent and the Grenadines ===
- La Soufrière

=== Sint Eustatius ===
- The Quill or Mount Mazinga

== See also ==
- Lists of volcanoes
- Volcanoes of the Caribbean
- List of volcanoes in the Dutch Caribbean
