= Grand Prismatic Spring =

Largest hot spring in the United States

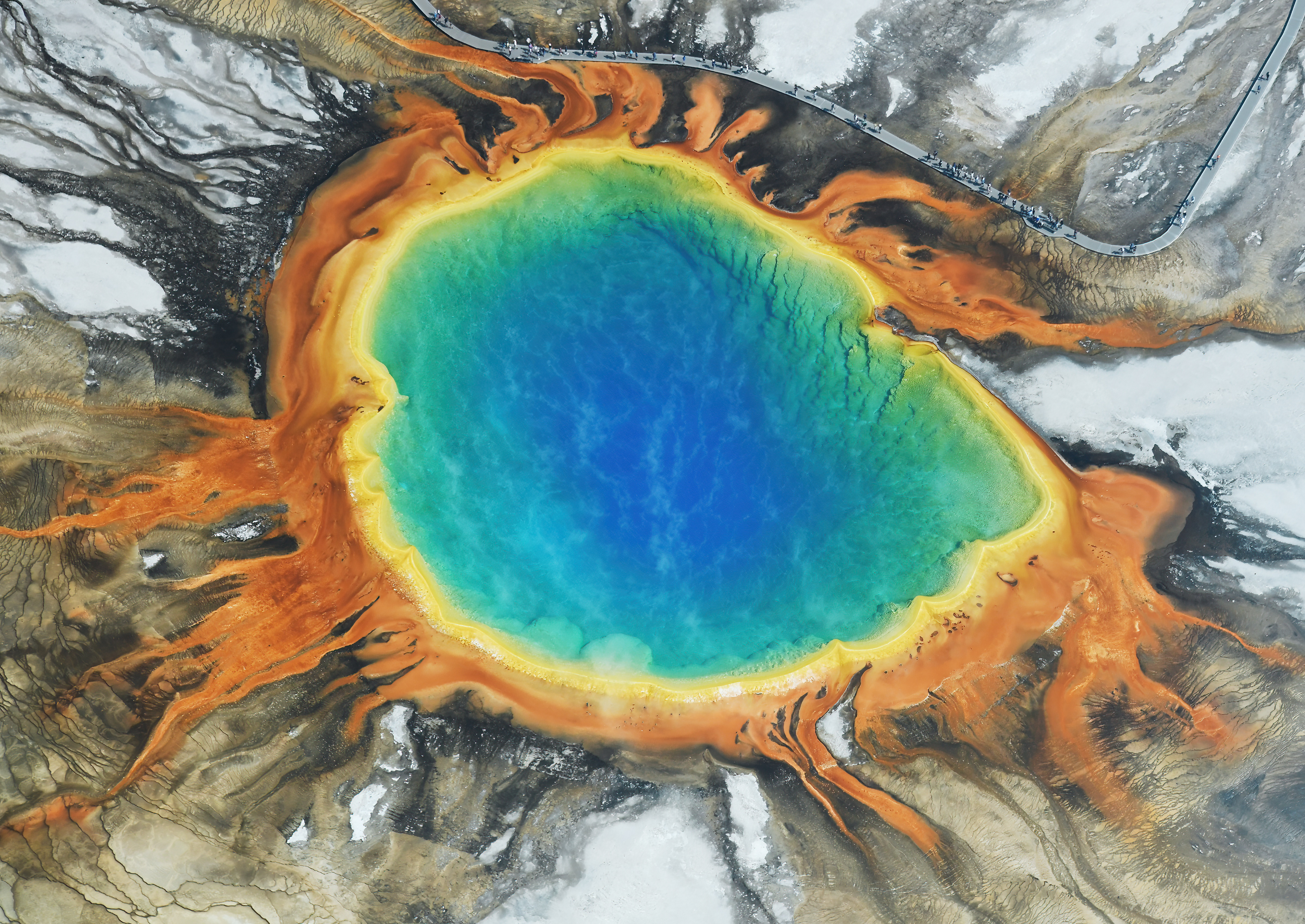
- Aerial view of the Grand Prismatic Spring
- Interactive map of Grand Prismatic Spring
- Location: Midway Geyser Basin, Yellowstone National Park, Teton County, Wyoming
- Coordinates: 44°31′30″N 110°50′17″W
- Elevation: 7,270 ft (2,220 m)
- Type: Hot spring
- Discharge: 560 US gal (2,100 L) per minute
- Temperature: 160 °F (70 °C)
- Depth: 160 ft (50 m)

The Grand Prismatic Spring is the largest hot spring in the Yellowstone National Park, and the third largest in the world, after Frying Pan Lake in New Zealand and Boiling Lake in Dominica. It is located in the Midway Geyser Basin.

Grand Prismatic Spring was noted by geologists working in the Hayden Geological Survey of 1871, and named by them for its striking coloration. Its colors match most of those seen in the rainbow: red, orange, yellow, green, and blue.

== History ==
The first records of the spring are from early European explorers and surveyors. In 1839, a group of four trappers from the American Fur Company crossed the Midway Geyser Basin and made note of a "boiling lake", most likely the Grand Prismatic Spring, with a diameter of 300 feet (90 m). In 1870 the Washburn–Langford–Doane Expedition visited the spring, noting a 50-foot (15 m) geyser nearby (later named Excelsior).

== Color ==
The bright, vivid colors in the spring are the result of microbial mats of thermophilic bacteria and archaea around the edges of the mineral-rich water. The mats produce colors ranging from green to red; the amount of color in the microbial mats depends on the ratio of chlorophyll to carotenoids and on the temperature gradient in the runoff. In the summer, the mats tend to be orange and red, whereas in the winter the mats are usually dark green.

The deep blue color of the water in the center of the pool results from the intrinsic blue color of water. The effect is strongest in the center of the spring, because of its sterility and depth.

== Physical structure ==
The spring is approximately 370 feet (110 m) in diameter and is 160 feet (50 m) deep. The spring discharges an estimated 560 US gallons (2,100 L) of 160 °F (70 °C) water per minute.

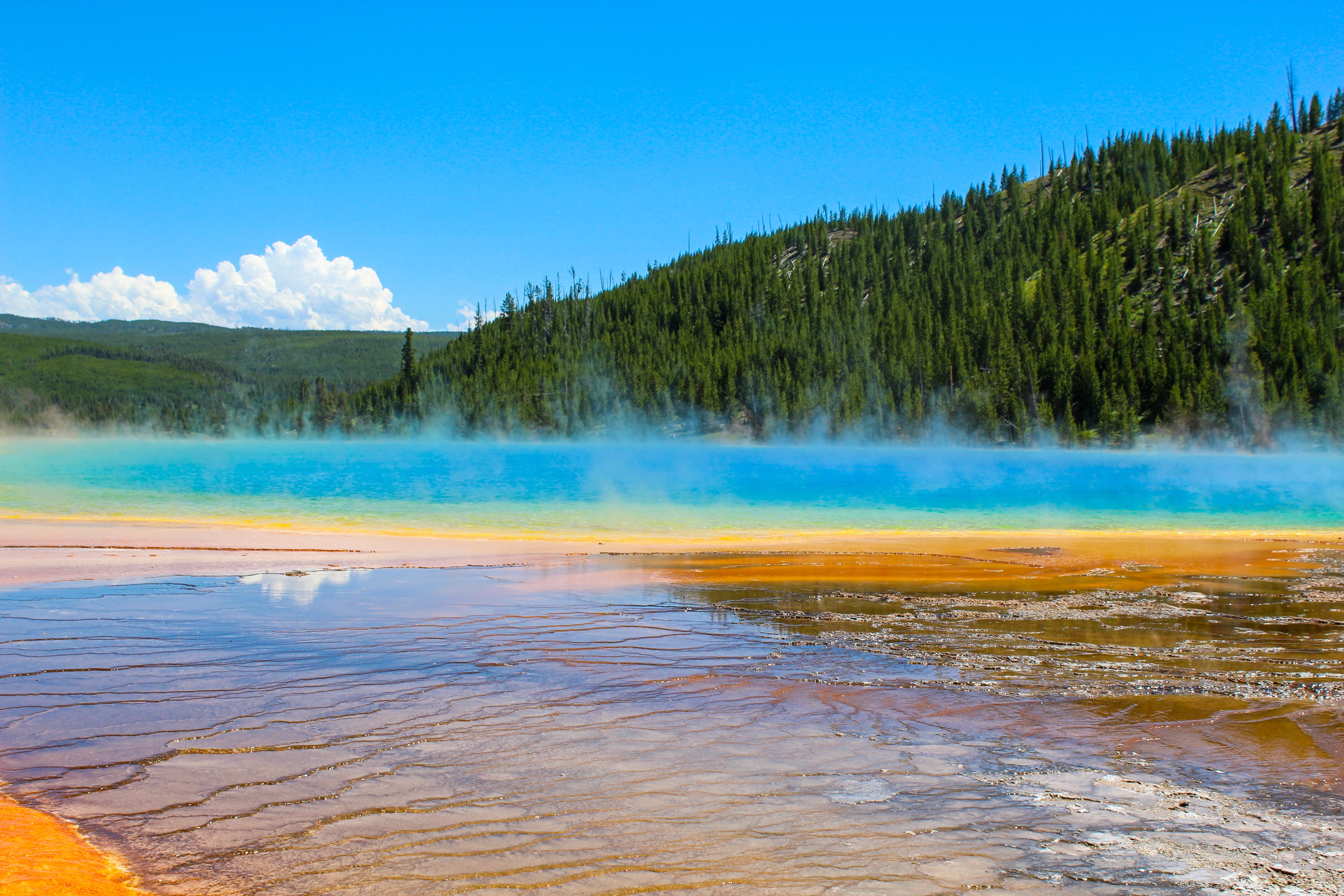
Grand Prismatic Spring

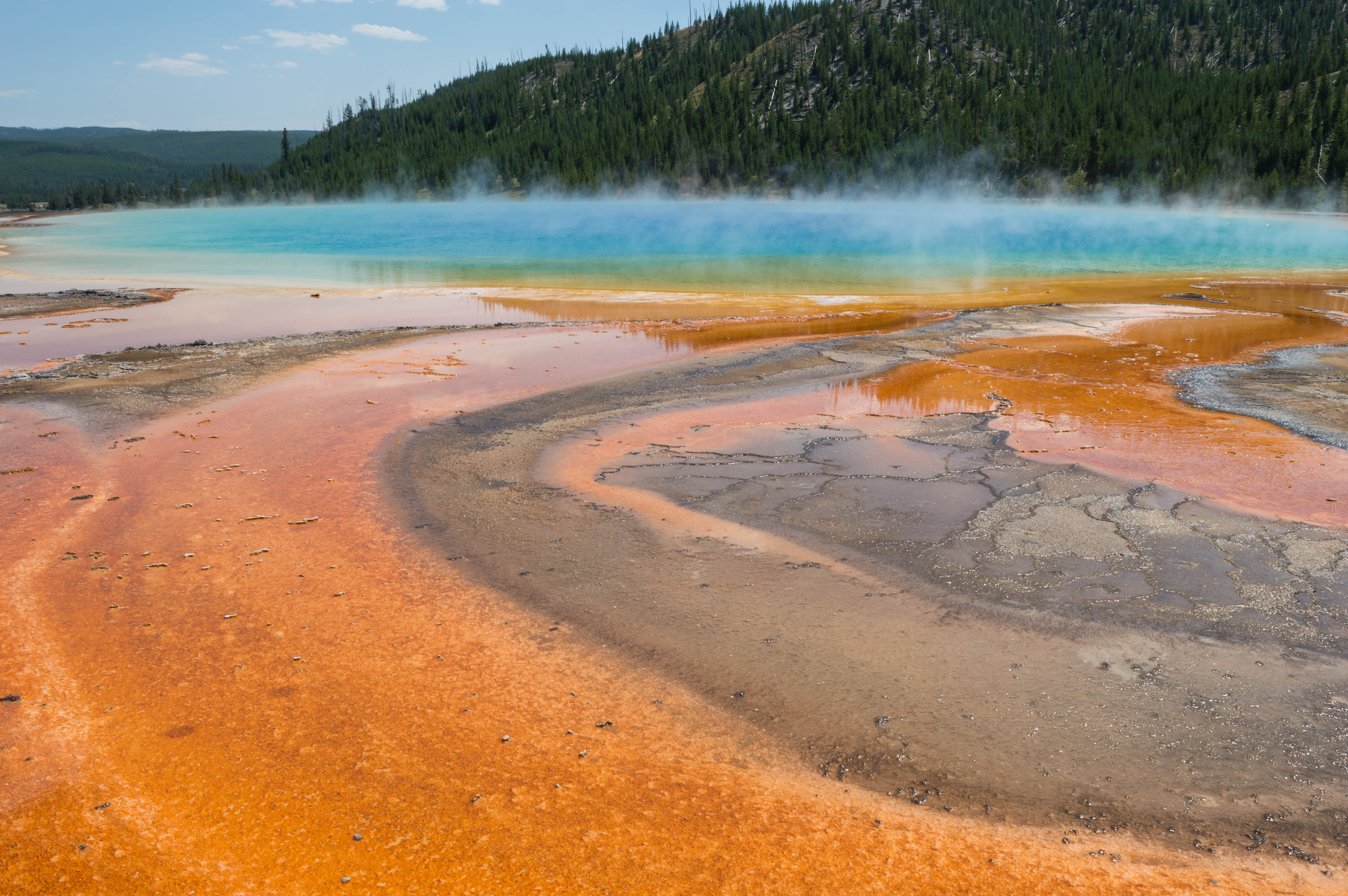
Microbial mat

Timelapse video of the Grand Prismatic Spring

Late afternoon view from Grand Prismatic Spring Overlook
