= Henry Alfred Alford Nicholls =

Sir Henry Alfred Alford Nicholls CMG FLS (27 September 1851 – 9 February 1926) was a physician, disease specialist, horticulturist, zoologist and legislator in, and publicist for Dominica for over 50 years. He published on a wide variety of topics and was awarded a knighthood for his services just before his death.

== Biography ==
Nicholls was born on 27 September 1851 in Spitalfields and baptised at nearby Christ Church on 31 December. He was the eldest of five children of Elizabeth Ann Pitkin and Thomas William Nicholls, a surgical instrument manufacturer. The family lived at 258 Kingsland Road, where Thomas practised his trade; later he was in business there with his second son, Walter James.

Nicholls attended the Whitechapel Foundation School. He entered St Bartholomew's Hospital Medical College on 25 October 1869 from where, in 1870, he was awarded, in the examination of practical anatomy at St Bartholomew's Hospital, a certificate, examiner's prize, and the Proctorship. The following year he delivered a lecture at school on "The digestive system", concluding a course on physiology. He graduated in medicine (MB and CM) at the University of Aberdeen in 1873, and gained his MD degree from St Bartholomew's Hospital in 1875. Almost immediately he emigrated to Dominica, to serve as Assistant Medical Officer to Dr John Imray who had been there since 1832.

Nicholls married Marion Crompton, the "shy and retiring third daughter" of John Corney Crompton and Marianne Félicité Renault, on 6 September 1877. In the period 1878 to 1891 they had 10 children: 4 boys and 6 girls. The family had two homes. One was at St Aroment - a thirty-acre estate on the outskirts of Roseau, which Nicholls inherited from Dr Imray; the other was Kingsland House, a one-story wooden town house "with a broad veranda".

=== Exploration, and Promotion of Dominica ===
Very soon after his arrival in Dominica, Nicholls and three companions went from Roseau to the interior of the island, in what is now known as Morne Trois Pitons National Park. There, with the help of their carriers (four men and some boys) they climbed up through heavily forested slopes and found Boiling Lake – "a large sheet of water in a constant state of ebullition." On a second trip, in April, the lake's altitude was found to be 2425 feet (739 metres), and its size about 150 by 80 yards, much smaller than estimated on the first trip.

Nicholls wrote an article about a volcanic explosion which took place about a mile southwest of Boiling Lake on 4 January 1880. In 1883 he wrote a letter giving a vivid description of the impact of a hurricane on 4 September, with 5 churches destroyed and over 400 families homeless in Roseau. In 1902 he gave a detailed account of events associated with the massive eruption of Mount Pelée in Martinique.

On 28 February 1880, Nicholls escorted 14 year-old George Prince of Wales (the future King George V), and his elder brother Prince Albert Victor, first on ponies and then on foot to the "highest point in the island, Morne Diablotin, 5,314 feet high, nearly a thousand feet higher than the highest point in Great Britain, Ben Nevis."

Nicholls was a frequent publicist for Dominica. At the Colonial and Indian Exhibition in South Kensington in 1886, he had a large showcase containing samples of many of Dominica's natural products, including essential oils, cocoa, sulphur, bark, coffee, annato [sic] and vanilla. It was "a trophy of multum in parvo" by exhibiting so compactly such a wide range of resources from the island.

=== Medicine ===
One of Nicholls' first papers after arrival in Dominica was on "Extraction of Foreign Bodies from the Ear" in which he differed from a previous correspondent, Mr Walter Rivington (surgeon in charge of the aural department at the London Hospital), on the best approach to adopt, and taking Rivington to task for relying only on syringing.

In 1877 Nicholls was appointed Medical Superintendent of the Dominica Yaws Hospital and, when Dr Imray retired, he succeeded him as Medical Officer of Public Institutions in 1880. In 1891 the Secretary of State for the Colonies appointed him as Special Commissioner to inquire into the prevalence of yaws in the West Indies. His report was published as a Blue book in 1894, and won warm praise from the then Secretary of State, Lord Knutsford: "your report is a monument of your ... ability as a scientific expert". Following this recognition Nicholls was able to write an authoritative chapter on yaws and its treatment.

Nicholls was editor of The Leeward Islands Medical Journal. He was also interested in tetanus, malaria and the hookworm disease ancylostomiasis. His most senior appointment before retirement was Principal Medical Officer of Dominica, made in 1922.

=== Botany, Horticulture and Zoology ===
Nicholls was particularly interested in expanding the cultivation of coffee in Dominica. In his paper on the subject he began by noting that "Liberian coffee was introduced into the West Indies from the Royal Gardens at Kew in the year 1874, when a few plants were sent by Sir Joseph Hooker to the Botanic Gardens at Jamaica and Trinidad, and to the late Dr Imray of Dominica." He goes on to describe the preferred soils and the need for shelter trees to protect from hurricanes.

In the early 1880s - during Hooker's last few years as Director of Kew - Nicholls was the Kew correspondent for Dominica. For that reason Nicholls dedicated his Text-Book on Tropical Agriculture to Sir Joseph. The demand for it was such that the book was reprinted seven times at intervals of about five years; it was also translated into several languages along with Swiss-Venezuelan geographer and botanist Henri François Pittier. Nicholls wrote many letters to Hooker, Sir William Thiselton-Dyer, Daniel Morris and others at Kew. He also contributed plants and seeds to the collection there.

Soon after his election as a Corresponding Member of the Zoological Society of London (CMZS), Nicholls donated two common boas and seven slender-fingered frogs to the zoo.

Nicholls' passion for expanding the export of fruit was expressed in his booklet on The cultivation of the banana in Dominica. He noted that now that Dominica had become the last port of call by the Quebec Steamship Company on its West Indies to New York line "there is no reason why the planters of the island should not participate in the profits from the banana trade", which currently was dominated by Jamaica. With his usual clarity and precision he went on to describe the conditions necessary for successful propagation of the fruit.

In 1887, James Anthony Froude travelled to the West Indies. During his visit to Dominica he was invited by Nicholls to visit his home, where he saw the very successful cultivation of lime trees:

I do not know the exact extent of the property which was under cultivation; perhaps it was twenty-five or thirty acres. The chief part of it was planted with lime trees, the limes which I saw growing being as large as moderate-sized lemons; most of the rest was covered with Liberian coffee, which does not object to the moist climate, and was growing with profuse luxuriance. Each tree, each plant had been personally attended to, pruned when it needed pruning, supported by bamboos if it was overgrowing its strength, while the ground about the house was consecrated to botanical experiments, and specimens were to be seen there of every tropical flower, shrub, or tree, which was either remarkable for its beauty or valuable for its chemical properties. His limes and coffee went principally to New York, where they had won a reputation, and were in special demand; but ingenuity tries other tracks besides the beaten one. Dr. Nicholls had a manufactory of citric acid which had been found equally excellent in Europe. Everything which he produced was turning to gold, except donkeys, seven or eight of which were feeding under his windows, and which multiplied so fast that he could not tell what to do with them.

— James Anthony Froude, The English in the West Indies (1888)

In 1889 The Royal Agricultural and Commercial Society of British Guiana sought and received advice on the packing of fruit for export. Nicholls gave precise instructions on when and how to cut oranges and limes, wrap them in a special paper, and pack them in specific designs of crate or barrel. His instructions were later printed for distribution.

=== Affiliations, Appointments and Awards ===
- Corresponding Member of the New York Academy of Sciences. Elected 1882.
- Fellow of the Linnean Society. Elected 21 June 1883.
- Corresponding Member of the Zoological Society of London. Elected 19 January 1888.
- Honorary Member of the Royal Agricultural and Commercial Society of British Guiana
- CMG: Companion of the Order of St Michael and St George. 1 January 1896
- Chairman of the Roseau Town Board. 1896-98.
- Official Member of the Legislative Council of Dominica. From 1898.
- Vice-President of the Dominica Agricultural Society
- Silver cup presented to him in 1914 by the West India Committee for the best individual Exhibit of Tropical Produce from the British West Indies, British Guiana or British Honduras
- War work - Food Prices Committee. 1914-1919.
- Joined the Executive Council of the Leeward Islands. 1922.
- Knighthood. Conferred 1 January 1926.

Henry Nicholls learned of his knighthood by telegram from the Governor of Dominica: "It gives me much pleasure to inform you that His Majesty has been graciously pleased to approve of K.B. (Knight Bachelor) Nicholls. Please convey my hearty congratulations." The event was celebrated at a gathering of Sir Henry & Lady Nicholls and relatives at Government House, at which Edward Carlyon Eliot, Administrator of Dominica and Nicholls' grandson by marriage, said:

Sir Henry and Lady Nicholls, I feel it a great privilege to-day to convey to you, in the presence of your family and old friends, the King's gracious pleasure in conferring on you, Sir, the Honour of Knighthood [...] We deplore, Sir, the bodily suffering which has been your lot in your well earned rest period, realising as we do that present loss of health is due to the years of faithful toil which you have given to this Presidency. We pray that your health may be restored, and that you and Lady Nicholls may be spared to us in health and happiness for years to come.

Sadly, Sir Henry died on 9 February 1926. Condolences were received from far and wide, including Sir Algernon Edward Aspinall, Secretary of the West India Committee, J Pierpont Morgan Jr. who was visiting Trinidad and J H Menzies in Canada, who wrote of Nicholls in an article entitled "The Uncrowned King of Dominica".

Nicholls was a leading member of the Anglican Church. After an impressive funeral, with many public figures attending, he was, as a mark of honour, "buried next to the church in Roseau rather than in the general church graveyard some distance away at Newtown." The white marble cross bears the inscription "Life's Work Well Done. Then Comes Rest".

=== Some Nicholls children and their descendants ===
- The Nicholls' second daughter, Elfreda Millicent (1883-1955), married Francis Byam Berkeley Shand on 27 March 1905, at "Roseau's social event of the year". Shand was to become Crown Attorney of Dominica. Their daughter Phyllis Shand Allfrey was a prominent figure on the island, founder of the Dominica Labour Party, and author of The Orchid House. Francis and Elfreda's eldest daughter, Alice Marion, married Edward Carlyon Eliot, Administrator of Dominica and 37 years her senior.
- Elfreda's younger brother, Ralph Edgar Alford (1885-1945), "the black sheep of the Nicholls family", had at least 11 children by two women: Margaret Evelyn Royer (10) and Clayron Royer (1), probably sisters. Clayron's daughter, Rosalind, married Cyril Frederick Louis Volney. Their son, Herbert Volney, was an MP in the 10th Republican Parliament of Trinidad and Tobago for 5 years until 17 June 2015. Ralph was a Freemason; he was initiated into the St George Lodge, Roseau in 1910.
- The Nicholls' youngest son, William Alford (1891-1970) was sent to Scotland to study medicine. In 1914 he joined the RAMC. The following year he was transferred to the Royal Artillery and served in France until 1919. He then re-enlisted in the RAMC, served in Egypt for three years, and returned to England. He found a job as a clerk but lost it through absence on a bout of drinking.

In 1927 he was sentenced by the magistrate, Herbert Wilberforce, in Marylebone to six months' hard labour, having pleaded guilty to charges of stealing a suit belonging to a fellow lodger, and obtaining money fraudulently from three police constables in London. Nicholls had already been imprisoned for 3 months in 1924 for stealing a suit from a room mate.

In the 1950s and 60s the electoral registers showed that William lived at 53 Lulworth House, Dorset Road, Vauxhall. He was entered alongside his wife Dorothy, and three of his four daughters, plus his son, William Alfred Alford Nicholls. The 1957 register shows all four:

Nicholls, Barbara D.
Nicholls, Dorothy A.
Nicholls, Joyce P.
Nicholls, Pamela R.
Nicholls, William Alford
Nicholls, William Alfred Alford

William Alford Nicholls died in the Westminster registration district in 1970. There is no record of a marriage.

=== Legacy ===
- Morne Nicholls, elevation 3,168 feet (966 metres), named after him.
- Tree Bat Ardops nichollsi named after him
- Ward named after him at Princess Margaret Hospital, Roseau
- Books from his collection added to a library reflecting the cultural and historical heritage of the Caribbean
- A Brief Memoir of Sir Henry Alfred Alford Nicholls, K. B., C.M.G., by His Honour Mr. Justice Noble (1928). Noble begins his memoir "Many of the leading citizens of Dominica have expressed their desire to have some short memoir of their late friend Sir Henry Nicholls published. In response to such an appeal it would seem only proper that a brief description of his work and career should be attempted."

As a final tribute to the Nicholls family, some of the characters in The Orchid House are clearly inspired by them at their home at L'Aromatique, with Old Master being Nicholls himself, and Rufus the errant Ralph.

== See also ==
- Henri François Pittier
- Edward Carlyon Eliot
