= Frying Pan Lake =

Hot spring in Waimangu Volcanic Rift Valley, New Zealand

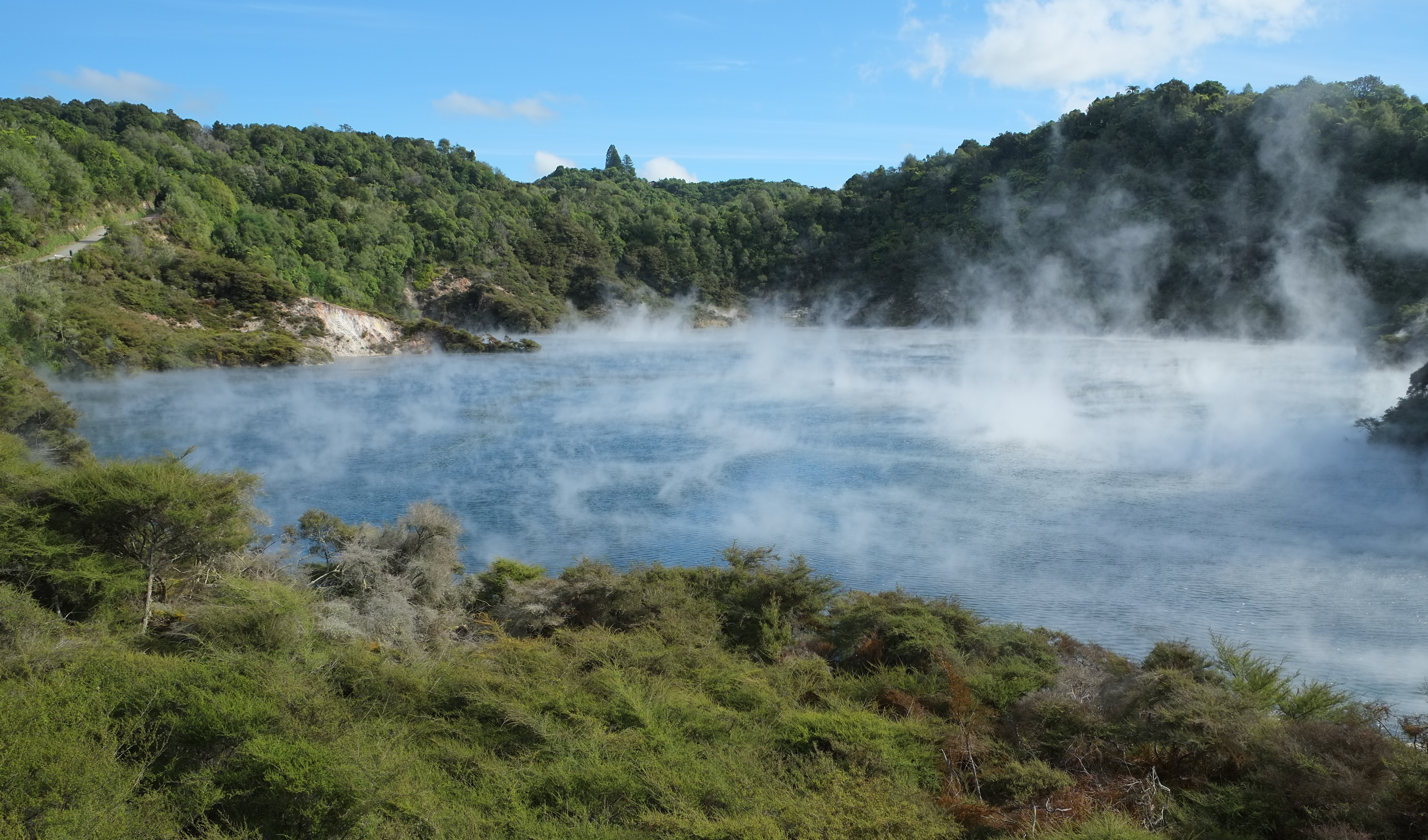
- Frying Pan Lake

- Location within North Island
- Interactive map of Frying Pan Lake
- Location: Waimangu Volcanic Rift Valley, North Island
- Coordinates: 38°17′01″S 176°23′42″E
- Primary inflows: (hot spring)
- Primary outflows: Waimangu Stream (Hot Water Creek)
- Basin countries: New Zealand
- Max. width: 200 m (660 ft)
- Surface area: 3.8 ha (9.4 acres)
- Average depth: 6 m (20 ft)
- Max. depth: 20 m (66 ft)
- Water volume: 200,000 m^{3} (160 acre⋅ft)

Frying Pan Lake (renamed Waimangu Cauldron in 1963 though not widely used) is the world's largest hot spring. It is located in the Echo Crater of the Waimangu Volcanic Rift Valley, New Zealand and its acidic water maintains a temperature of about 50 to 60 °C (122–140 °F). The Lake covers 38,000 square metres (9.4 acres) in part of the volcanic crater and the shallow lake is only 5.5 metres (18 ft) deep, but at vents, it can go down to 18.3 metres (60 ft).

Echo Crater was formed as part of the 1886 Mount Tarawera eruption, which opened several craters along a 17-kilometre (11 mi) rift stretching southwest from Mount Tarawera to the nearby Southern Crater. After this event, the crater's floor partly filled with rainwater and heated groundwater, but it was not until after a large eruption in Echo Crater on 1 April 1917 that the resulting larger crater filled up from hot springs to reach its current size by mid-1918.

The most recent eruption in Echo Crater occurred on 22 February 1973, destroying the Trinity Terrace area on the south-eastern shore of Frying Pan Lake. An area of colourful sinter terraces is still visible on the western shore of the lake. To the north, the lake is bounded by the steaming Cathedral Rocks. This monolithic rock structure is composed of rhyolitic lava at least 60,000 years old and was named Gibraltar Rock until the 1917 Echo Crater eruption completely changed its shape. A fumarole known as the Devil's Blowhole in the northern wall of Echo Crater also disappeared in that event.

The water of Frying Pan Lake is typically steaming and can appear to be boiling, due to carbon dioxide and hydrogen sulphide gas bubbling to the surface, but the lake's average temperature is 55 °C (131 °F). The lake and its outflow, Waimangu Stream (referred to as Hot Water Creek in the Waimangu Wanderer Guide), have an average pH level of 3.8, even though some of the boiling hot springs and vents on the lake's bed feed it with alkaline water of pH 8.2 to 8.7. This leads to various gradients of pH levels, which govern which types of algae are present, the blue-green algae Mastigocladus laminosus, or the eukaryotic algae Cyanidium caldarium.

The unique cyclic nature of the hydrothermal system interconnecting Frying Pan Lake and the nearby Inferno Crater Lake has been the subject of studies since monitoring equipment was installed in 1970 at the outflow stream from Frying Pan Lake and at Inferno Crater Lake. Both lakes' water levels and overflow volumes follow a complicated rhythm that repeats itself roughly every 38 days. When the water level and temperature of Inferno Crater Lake increase, the water level and outflow of Frying Pan Lake decrease.

The outflow volume of Frying Pan Lake has decreased from over 122 litres per second (4.3 cubic feet per second) in 1970 to around 100 L/s (3.5 cu ft/s) in 2014, but varies by up to 20 L/s (0.7 cu ft/s) as part of the 38-day cycle.

Frying Pan Lake is one of the first major attractions encountered along the main Waimangu walking track. The site of the extinct Waimangu Geyser is located not far from its north-eastern shore.

== See also ==
- Boiling Lake
- Grand Prismatic Spring
- List of hot springs
