= Ficus ovalifolia =

Ficus ovalifolia is a taxon synonym for two species of plants:

- Ficus ovalifolia Pittier, a synonym of Ficus maitin Pittier
- Ficus ovalifolia Ridl., a synonym of Ficus pungens Reinw. ex Blume
