= Imray =

Imray is a surname which may refer to:

- Colin Imray (1909–1998), British colonial policeman involved in the 1948 Accra riots
- Sir Colin Imray (diplomat) (1933–2020), British High Commissioner to Tanzania and Bangladesh
- John Imray (1811–1880), Dominican physician, legislator, agriculturist and botanist
- John Imray (patent attorney) (1820–1902), Scottish engineer and patent agent
