= Inferno Crater Lake =

Large hot spring in New Zealand's Waimangu Valley

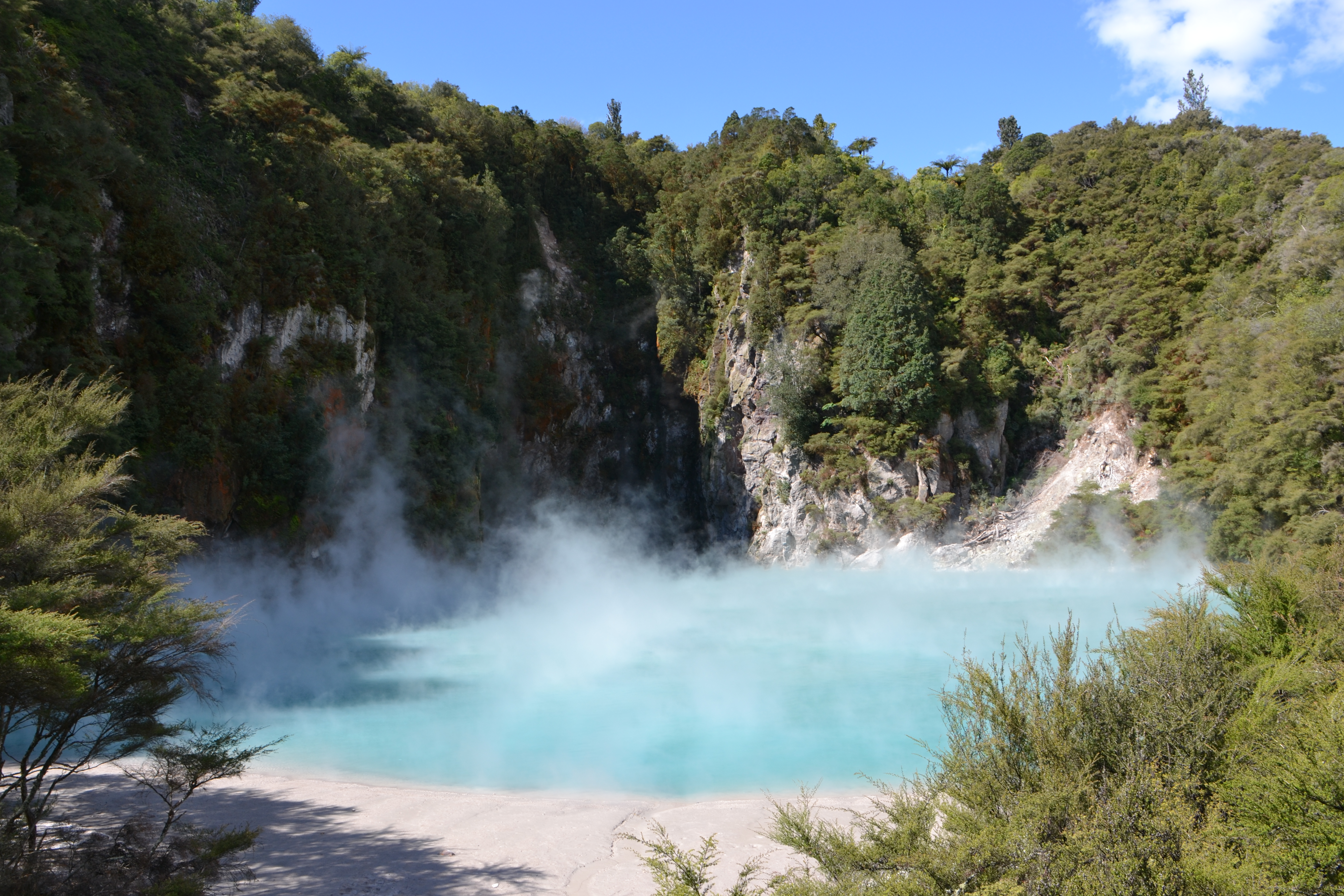
- Inferno Crater Lake at high lake level

- Location within North Island
- Location: Waimangu Volcanic Rift Valley, North Island
- Coordinates: 38°16′55″S 176°23′59″E
- Primary inflows: (underwater geyser)
- Primary outflows: cyclic overflow into Waimangu Stream
- Basin countries: New Zealand
- Average depth: 22 to 30 m (72 to 98 ft)
- Max. depth: 30 m (98 ft)

Inferno Crater Lake is a large hot spring located in the Waimangu Volcanic Rift Valley on the North Island of New Zealand, and the largest geyser-like feature in the world. The actual geyser is not visible, as it plays underwater at the bottom of the lake. However, fumaroles are visible on the lake's shore and the rock wall behind it.

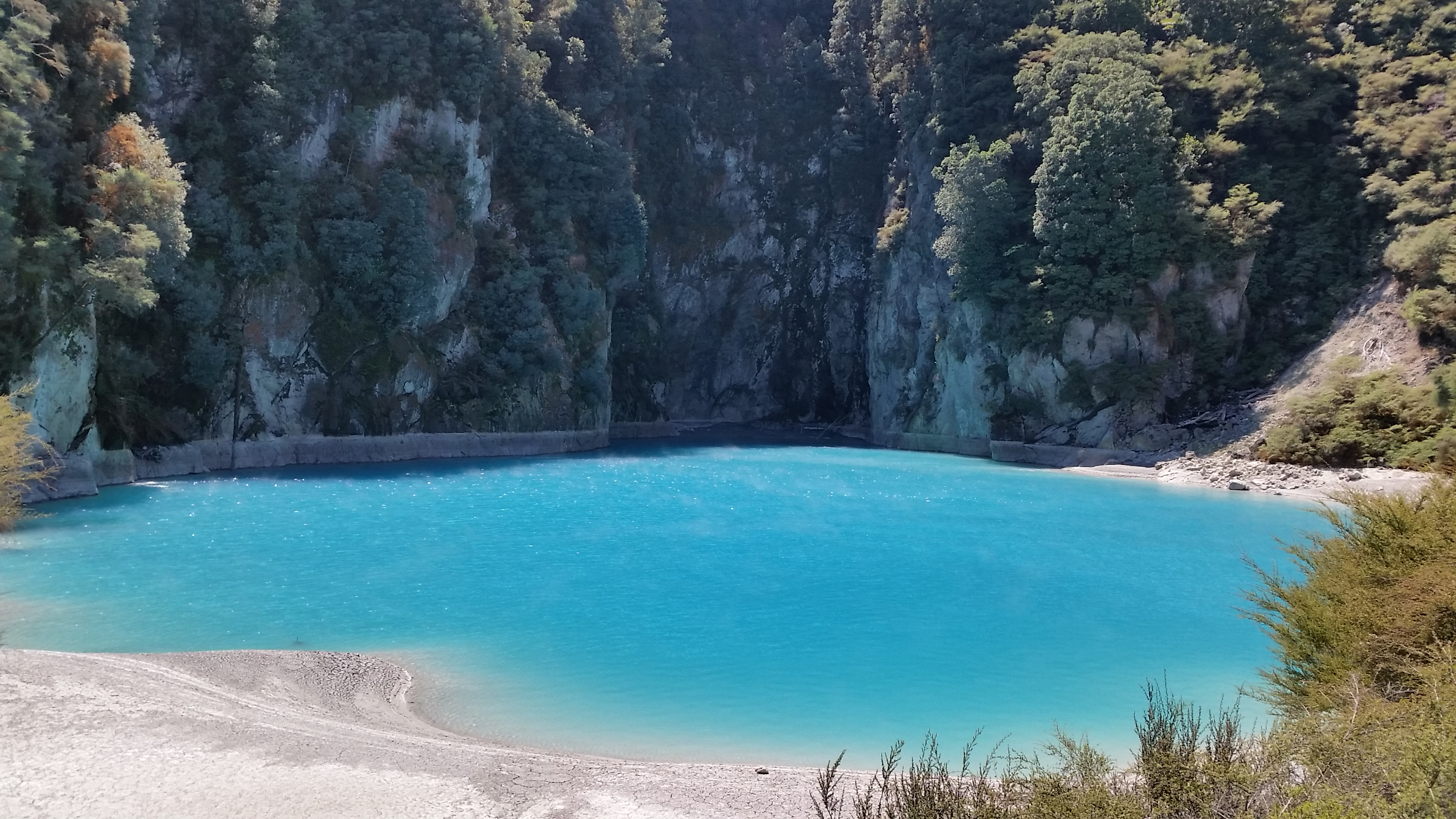

The water temperature in the lake shifts from 35 to 80 °C (95 to 176 °F) every six weeks, with acidity up to pH 2.2, and lake levels that vary up to 12 metres (39 ft), following a complicated 38-day cycle that includes an overflow stage. White silica deposits grow up to the overflow level, and the lake's colour is a result of finely divided silica suspended in the water. At low water levels the lake can be a dull grey colour, changing to an intensely sky blue colour at higher lake levels, in particular after the overflow stage.

Inferno Crater was blasted out of the side of the locally prominent Mt Haszard as part of the 1886 Mount Tarawera eruption, which opened several craters along a 17-kilometre (11 mi) rift stretching southwest from Mount Tarawera to the nearby Southern Crater. Inferno Crater's trumpet-shaped lake bed is up to 30 metres (98 ft) deep when the lake is full, which is also when it reaches its highest temperature.

Since 1901 the lake occupying Inferno Crater has exhibited water-level variations closely associated with the Waimangu Geyser cycle. Inferno Crater Lake and its neighbouring Frying Pan Lake form a unique relationship and follow an interconnected rhythmic cycle of hydrology variations repeating itself over the course of roughly 38 days. When the water level and temperature of Inferno Crater Lake increase, the water level and outflow of Frying Pan Lake decrease. Comparable cyclic activity is unknown in other hydrothermal systems in the world.

The system has been the subject of studies since monitoring equipment was installed in the area in 1970. Four distinct phases can be recognised in its cycle: First, the lake level rises steadily from its lowest level by a total of almost five metres (16 ft) over the course of eight days, and then it commences oscillating. The average lake level keeps rising over the course of the oscillations of the second phase until it reaches overflow level. At that point, the lake's volume has increased by 45,800 cubic metres (45.8 million litres; 12.1 million US gallons). Next, the lake overflows for about 51 hours at a rate of almost 80 litres per second (0.080 m^{3}/s; 21 US gal/s), discharging on average 140,000 cubic metres (140 million litres; 37 million US gallons) of over 70 °C (158 °F) hot water down a temporary overflow stream into Waimangu Stream in the valley below. The last stage sees the lake recede to its low level over the last 13 days of the cycle, its water temperature also falling to the low point. During that stage, around 30 million litres (30 thousand cubic metres; 7.9 million US gallons) of water drain back under Mt Haszard.

Inferno Crater Lake is accessible via a side track with 50 steps off the main Waimangu walking track. It is one of three lakes filling craters created in the vicinity during the 1886 event.
