= Morne Nicholls =

Mountain in Dominica in the Lesser Antilles

Morne Nicholls is a mountain in Dominica named after Dominican Sir Henry Alfred Alford Nicholls. The mountain is located on a hiking trail nearby to Morne Watt leading to the Valley of Desolation and Boiling Lake.

Morne Nicholls has an elevation of 3,168 feet.
