= Toulaman River =

River in Dominica

Coordinates: 15°33′N 61°18′W

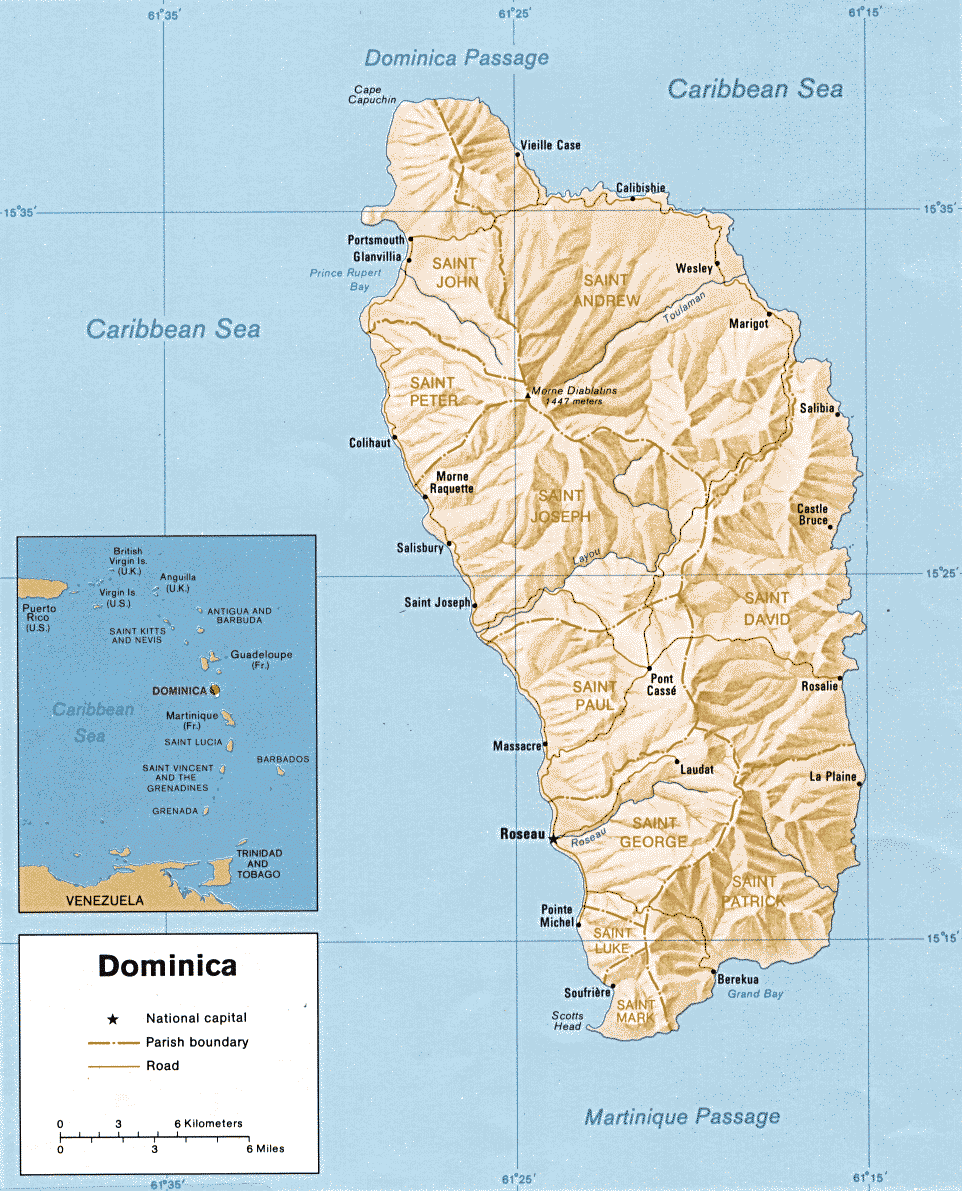
Map

The Toulaman River is a river in Dominica. Its source is in the Morne Diablotins. It empties into the sea on the northeastern coast, north of Marigot.

== See also ==
- List of rivers of Dominica
