= Waimangu Volcanic Rift Valley =

Volcanic Valley in New Zealand

Coordinates: 38°16′57″S 176°23′56″E

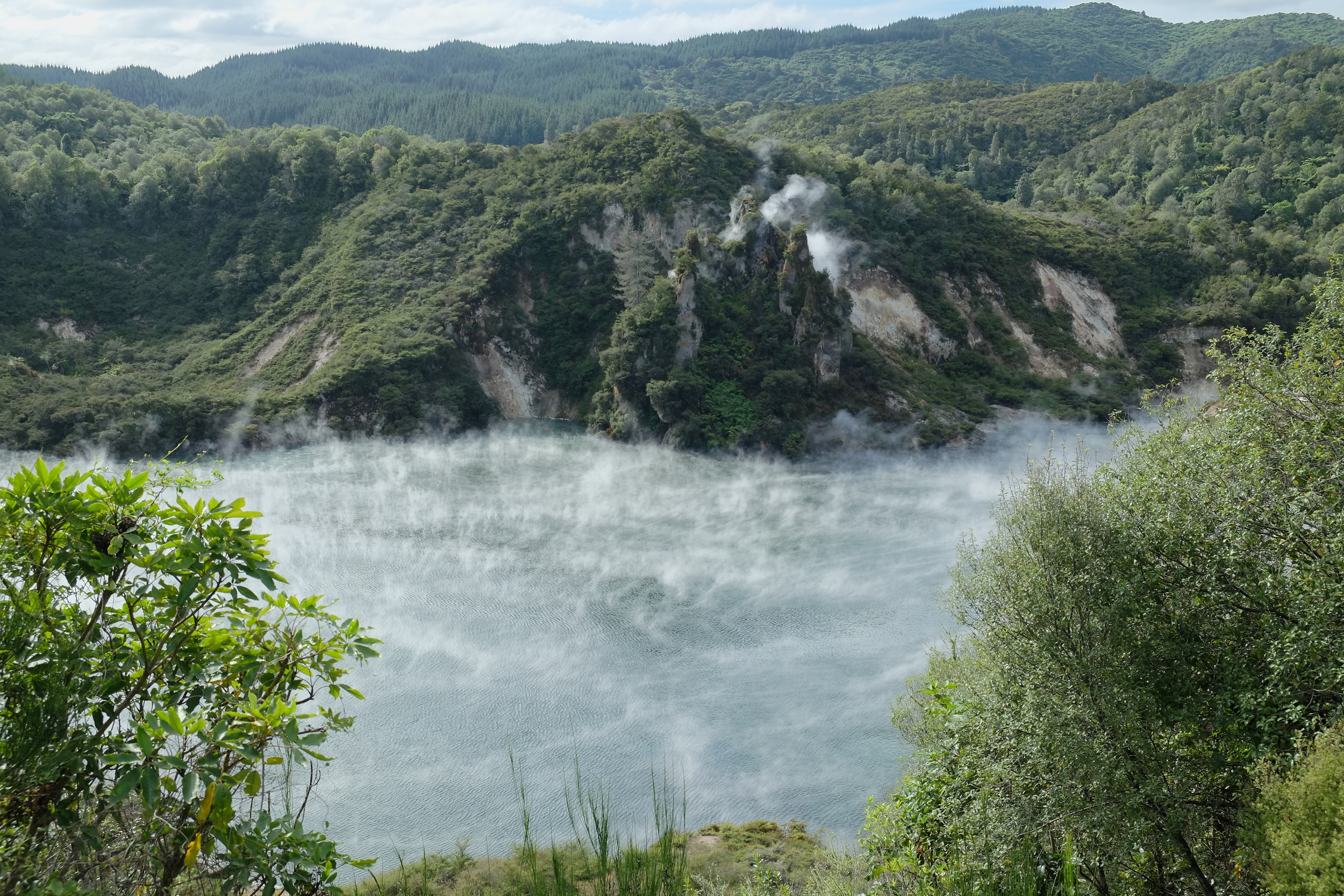
Frying Pan Lake and Cathedral Rocks

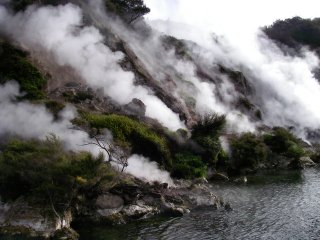
Thermal activity on the shore of Lake Rotomahana, near the former site of the Pink Terrace

The Waimangu Volcanic Rift Valley is the hydrothermal system created on 10 June 1886 by the volcanic eruption of Mount Tarawera, on the North Island of New Zealand. It encompasses Lake Rotomahana, the site of the Pink and White Terraces, as well as the location of the Waimangu Geyser, which was active from 1900 to 1904. The area has been increasingly accessible as a tourist attraction and contains Frying Pan Lake, which is the largest hot spring in the world, and the steaming and usually pale blue Inferno Crater Lake, the largest geyser-like feature in the world although the geyser itself cannot be seen since it plays at the bottom of the lake.

Waimangu is a Māori-language word meaning "black water". This name comes from the water that was thrown up by the Waimangu Geyser, which was black with mud and rocks.

From the 1890s onwards, the valley has gradually been re-populated naturally by plants ranging from hot water-loving algae and bacteria to mosses and many species of native ferns, shrubs and trees. These in turn support native birdlife including kererū, tūī, shining cuckoo, fantail, bellbird, and pūkeko, as well as introduced bird species such as mynah, magpie, finch and sparrow. A population of black swan thrives in the lower parts of the valley and on Lake Rotomahana. According to local guides, these have been introduced to the region from Western Australia by George Edward Grey in the 19th century along with wallaby.

As a rare eco-system completely naturally re-established following a volcanic eruption, Waimangu is protected as a Scenic Reserve, administered by the Department of Conservation NZ. The developing local native forest is the only current New Zealand instance of vegetation re-establishing from complete devastation without any human influence such as planting. Many of Waimangu's geothermal features are ranked as Category A – extremely important, of international significance.

== History ==
The largest volcanic eruption in the past 700 years in New Zealand, the 1886 Mount Tarawera eruption, created the geo-thermal area of the Waimangu Volcanic Rift Valley. The valley lies at the south-western end of the 17-kilometre (11 mi) rift created in this one-day eruption. All vegetation in the Waimangu Valley was completely destroyed by the eruption and the area was covered in mud and volcanic ash on average 20 metres (66 ft) thick.

Over the decade following the Mount Tarawera eruption, hydrothermal surface activity and geothermal features permanently established themselves in the Waimangu Valley, even though no such activity had been reported there before 1886. Plant life slowly re-established itself around the turn of the century as the new soil began to settle and stabilise.

The first significant hydrothermal feature of the area was the Waimangu Geyser, active from 1900 to 1904. Over the course of the first two decades of the 20th century, several events shaped the area around Echo Crater and Inferno Crater. Eruptions in 1915 and 1917 enlarged Echo Crater. The craters formed by the latter eruption filled up to become Frying Pan Lake by mid 1918. Further smaller eruptions continued throughout the 20th century, with the most recent one in May 1981 in the Raupo Pond Crater destroying the Mud Rift created there in 1906.

== Geothermal and hydrothermal features ==
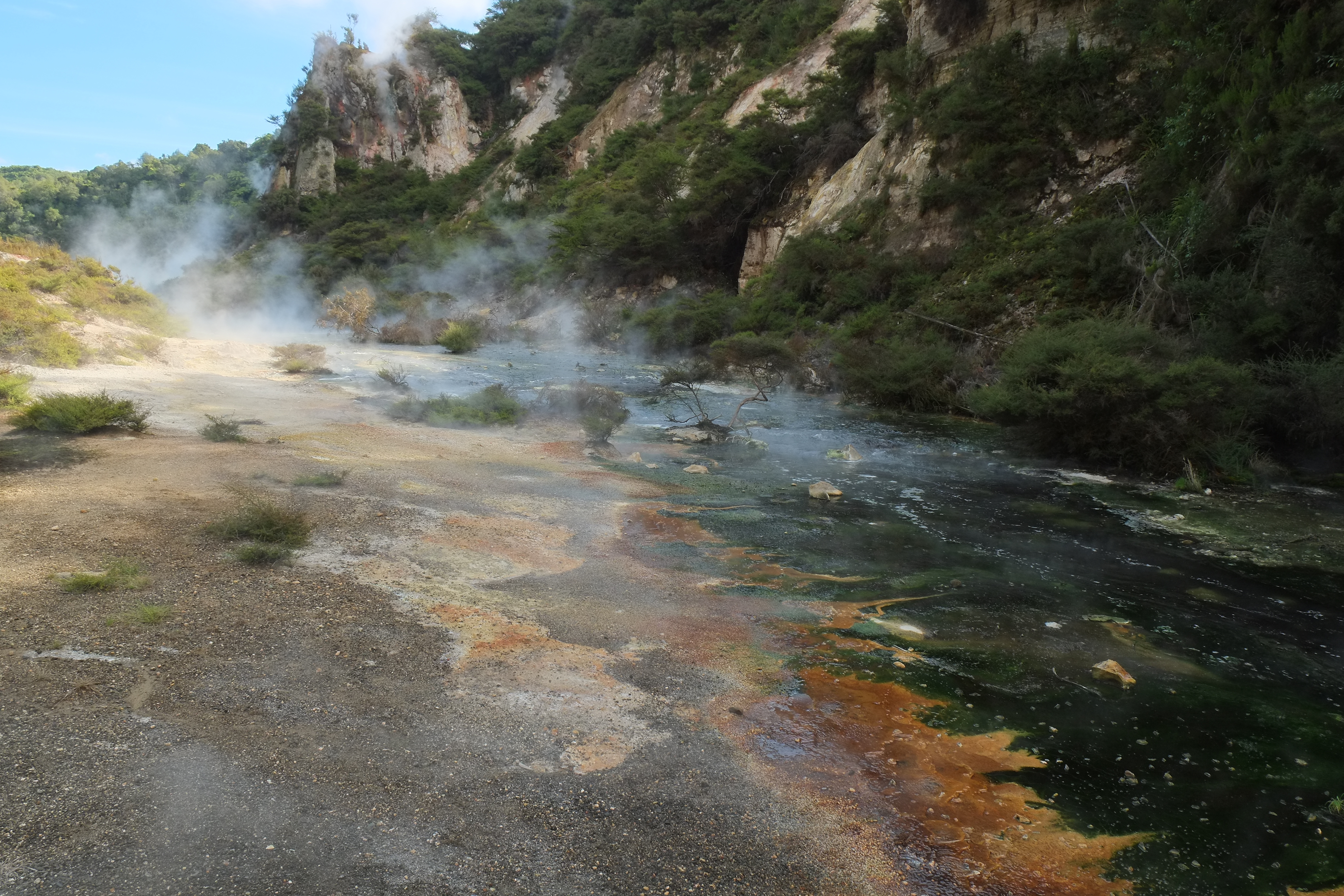
Frying Pan Lake overflow stream

The four-kilometre (2.5 mi) stretch of the Waimangu Volcanic Rift Valley running from Southern Crater to the shores of Lake Rotomahana has been a hotspot of geothermal and hydrothermal activity since the 1886 Mount Tarawera eruption, and contains the three lake-filled craters Southern Crater, Echo Crater, and Inferno Crater, as well as the bush-clad Raupo Pond Crater, Fairy Crater and Black Crater.

The 50-metre-deep (160 ft) Southern Crater was formed by the 1886 Mount Tarawera eruption and has not been notably active since. Its floor is filled by the shallow two-metre-deep (6.6 ft) Emerald Pool, a cold water lake of mostly rainwater. The lake's water is usually a brown colour, but can vary depending on the state of the plants growing in it. Red aquatic fern growth is sometimes present.

A short distance northeast lies Echo Crater, the biggest crater of the area, filled with the steaming-hot Frying Pan Lake, which is the largest hot spring in the world. The lake has an average depth of six metres (20 ft) and covers 38,000 square metres (410,000 sq ft). The average temperature of its acidic (pH 3.5) water is 55 °C (131 °F) and the lake's overflow is the source of Waimangu Stream (Hot Water Creek) flowing through the valley and into Lake Rotomahana.

Colourful sinter terraces are visible on the western shore of Frying Pan Lake, and immediately east of Echo Crater was the site of the extinct Waimangu Geyser. The crater area continued to be the source of eruptions in 1915, 1917, and last in 1973, and is still highly active, as evident by the steaming Cathedral Rocks to the north, and a cluster of hot springs and silica formations northeast of the lake referred to as "Hot Springs of Mother Earth (Nga Puia o te Papa)".

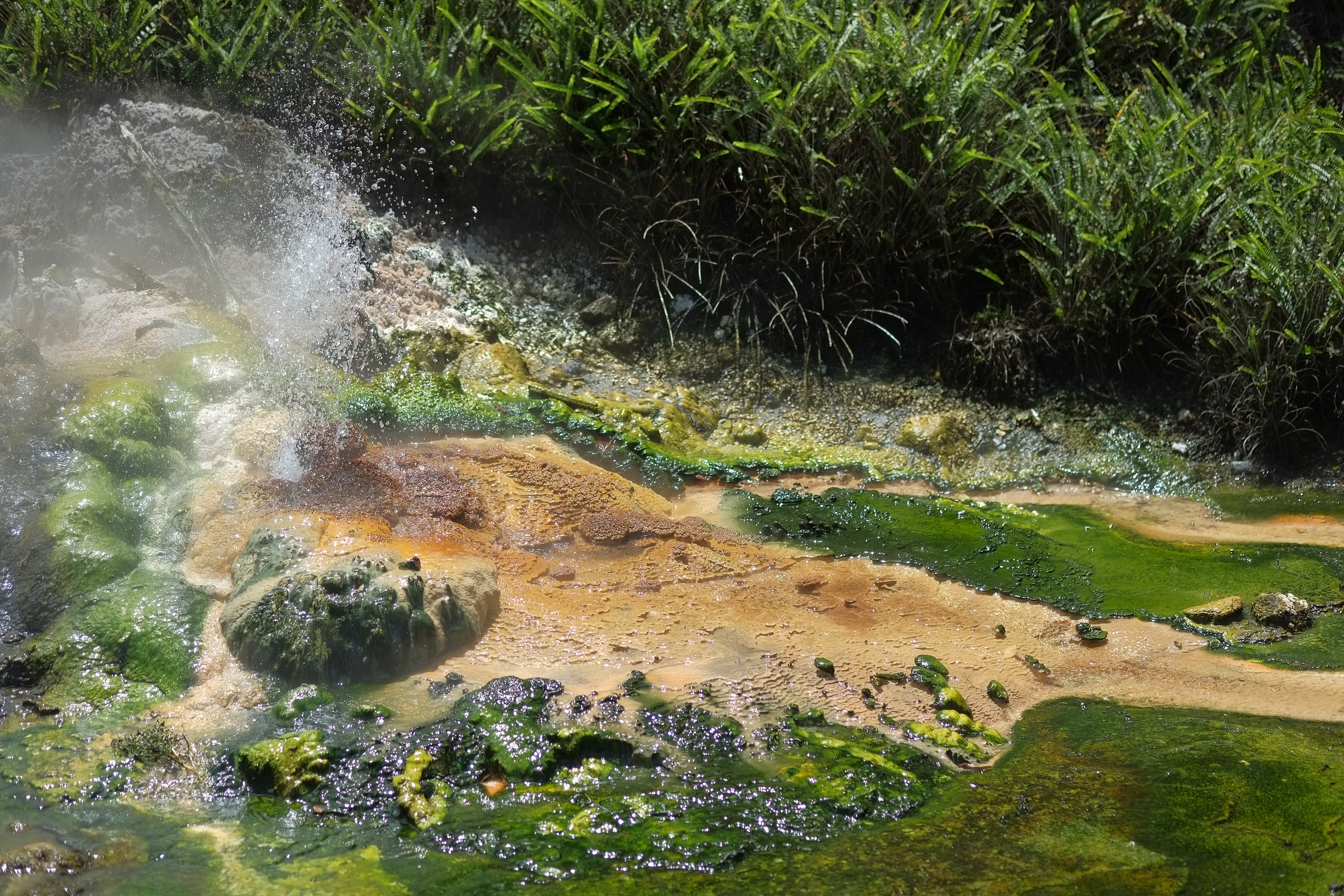
Bird's Nest Spring

The margins of Waimangu Stream from Frying Pan Lake to east of Inferno Crater are covered with delicate silica formations and colourful mineral deposits containing traces of arsenic, molybdenum, antimony, and tungsten, while the stream bed is home to blue-green algae and filamentous colonies of the photosynthetic bacterium Chloroflexus aurantiacus in a range of colours from bright green to orange. In the midst of this area is the picturesque Bird's Nest Terrace, a delicate silica terrace with the small volcano-shaped Bird's Nest Spring atop continuously erupting near boiling-hot water about one metre (3.3 ft) high. The terrace is covered in blue-green algae, which cannot survive in the hot stream of water running down from the spring, providing a colourful contrast of green and orange.

Further along, Waimangu Stream flows past the aptly named Clamshell Spring, a hot spring of boiling silica-rich water, and then continues through a deep natural trench with walls of silica stalactite formations formed by the dripping of trickles of mineral-rich water.

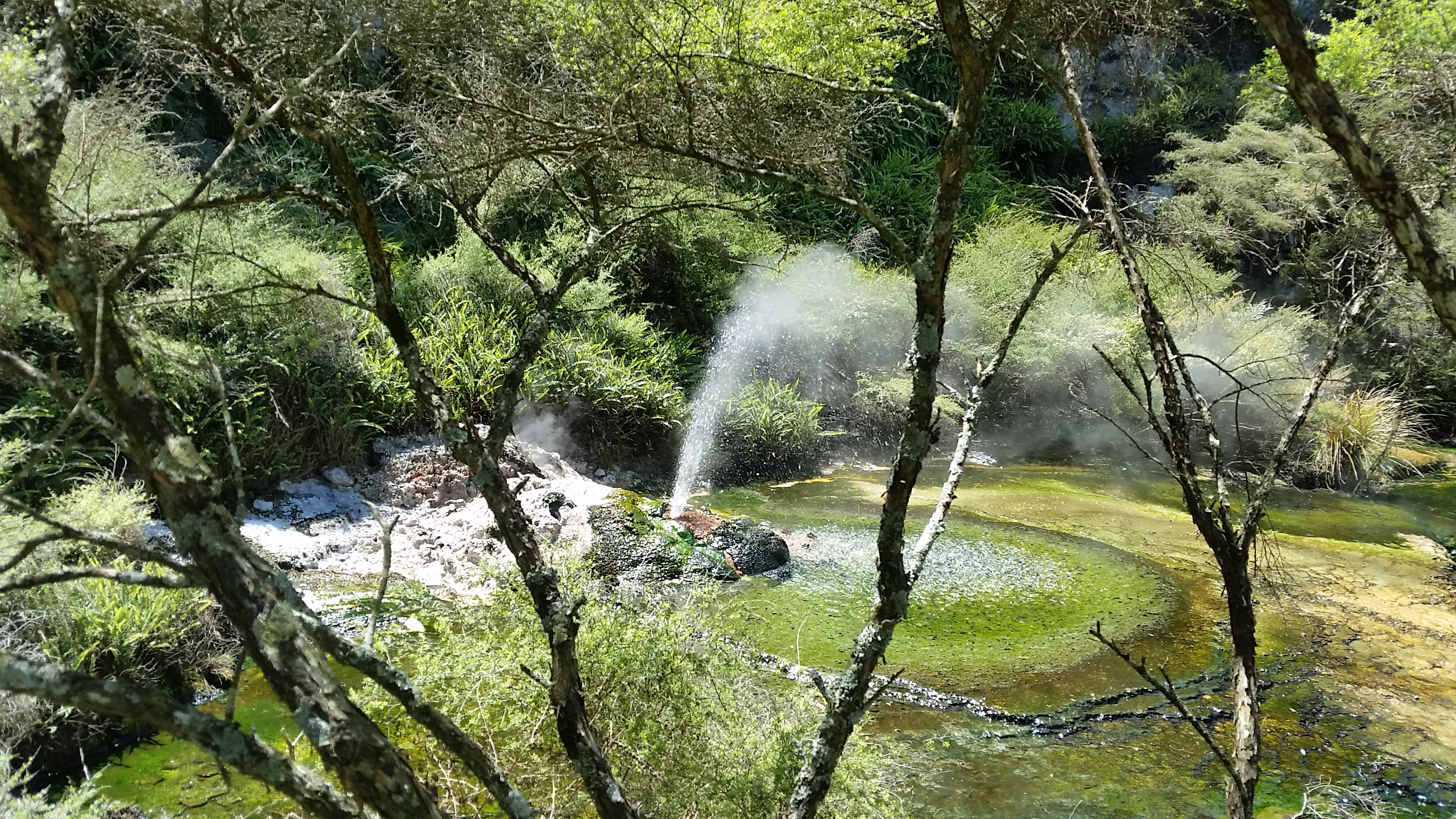
Bird's nest terrace spring

North of this area, on the slope of Mt Haszard, is Inferno Crater, filled with a striking pale blue lake of highly acidic water with a pH as low as 2.2. The crater was blasted into the side of the mountain as part of the 1886 Mount Tarawera eruption event and remains the site of the largest geyser-like feature in the world. Although the actual geyser plays at the bottom of the lake and cannot be seen, a handful of active fumaroles are visible on the shore and the cliff face behind the lake. The water level of this up-to-30-metre-deep (98 ft) lake follows a complicated rhythmic cycle that is interconnected with the nearby Frying Pan Lake.

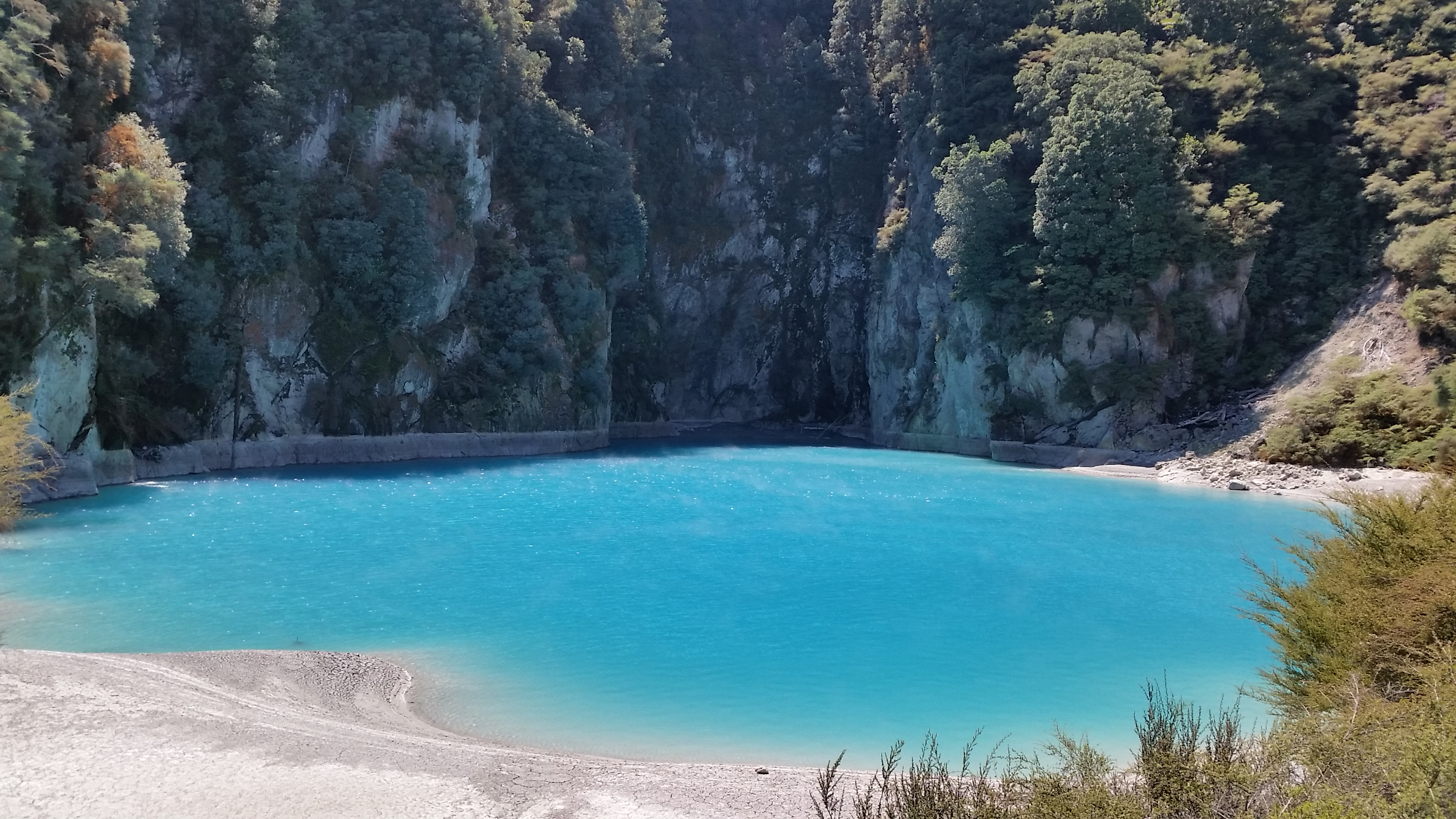
Inferno crater at Waimangu volcanic rift

Mt. Haszard was named after school teacher Charles Haszard and members of his family who were killed during the Mount Tarawera eruption. The locally prominent small mountain contains the shallow Raupo Pond Crater, the 56-metre-deep (184 ft), steep-sided Fairy Crater, and Black Crater. All of these craters were formed during the Mount Tarawera eruption and have subsequently been completely covered in native bush.

Waimangu Stream continues east past Mt Haszard and past a prominent kaolin clay slope featuring hot springs, to merge with the cold water Haumi Stream, which cools the combined water flow considerably.

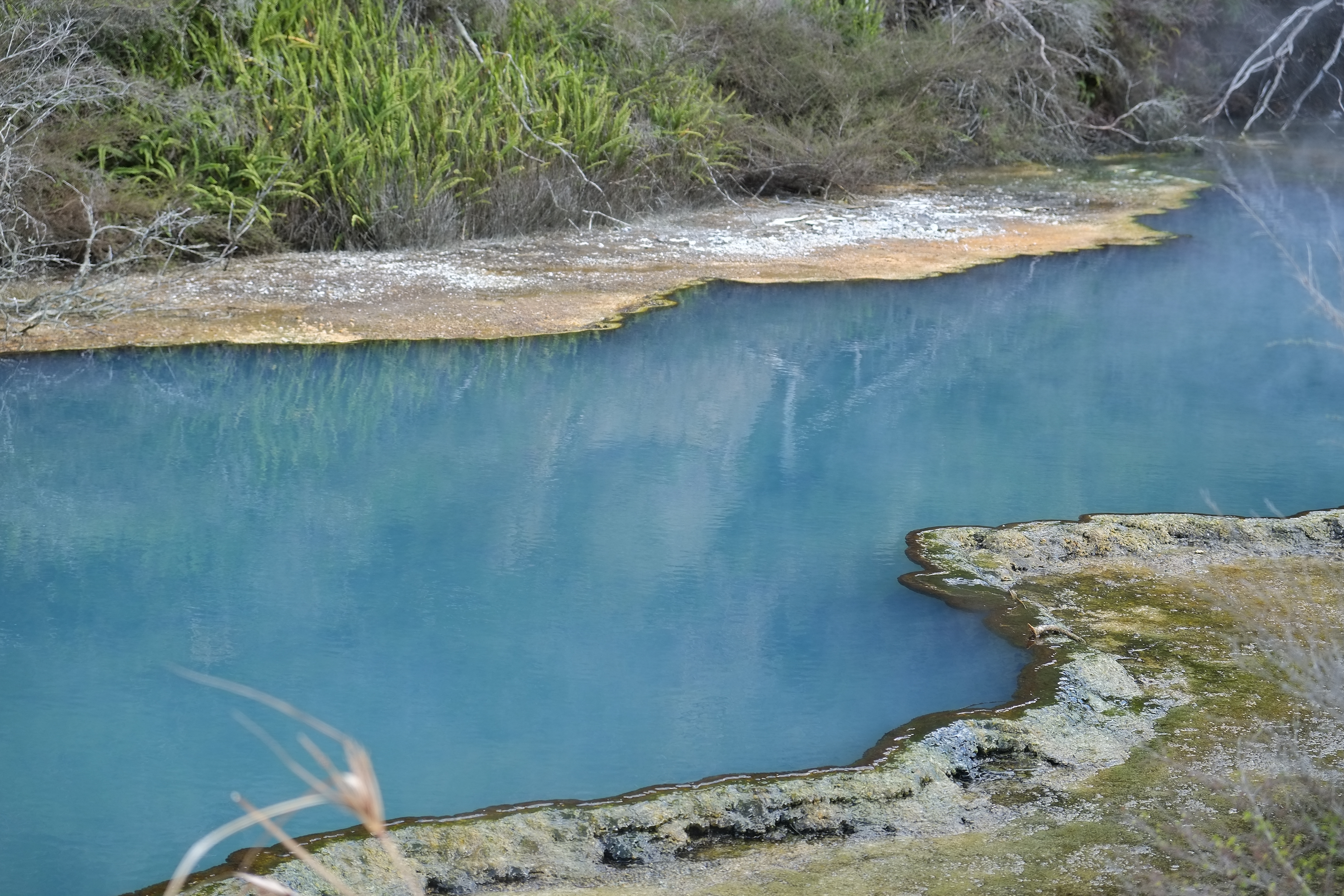
Blue pool at Warbrick Terrace

Further geothermal features along the lower part of the valley include the Marble Terrace, featuring an expansive sinter flat and buttresses composed of similar material to the Pink and White Terraces, and the multi-coloured Warbrick Terrace. The white and orange silica deposits of the Marble Terrace are fed by the hot spring in Iodine Pool, with small waves of water overflowing the pool at around 97 °C (207 °F) temperature and washing over the terrace. Iodine Pool is named after the brown colouring of the rocks and bank around it.

Warbrick Terrace at the end of the Rift Valley is named after members of the Warbrick family, who were involved in guiding tours in the area in the two decades following the 1886 Mount Tarawera eruption. The terrace is a set of fast-growing orange and white silica platforms similar to Marble Terrace. From the 1930s to the 1950s, a small geyser played on the terrace. The area in this open-sided crater features several small clearly visible hot springs and a prominent aggregation of layers forming a dam around a pale blue pool of silica-rich water. The dam started growing in the 1990s by sinter deposition that is assisted by the growth of algae and encloses an ever-deepening pond of water behind it. The pond drains from time to time, revealing the delicate silica formations and edges.

== Fauna and flora ==
Waimangu is home to a wide range of micro-organisms and plants adapted to the different thermal conditions in the valley, from thermophilic bacteria surviving temperatures of 70 °C (158 °F) and algae growing in acidity levels of pH 3.8 to mosses and prostrate kanuka growing in soil temperatures up to 55 °C (131 °F).

All vegetation in the valley originates from no earlier than the 1890s, when plants started re-populating the area in a natural succession following the complete destruction of any plant life by the 1886 Mount Tarawera eruption. Over the past 120 years, plant life in the Waimangu Valley has re-established itself via dispersion of spores and seeds by wind and birds; no plantings by humans were done. Subsequent small eruptions still caused local disturbance of the flora, notably the 1917 Echo Crater eruption destroying much of the flora between the crater and the visitor centre.

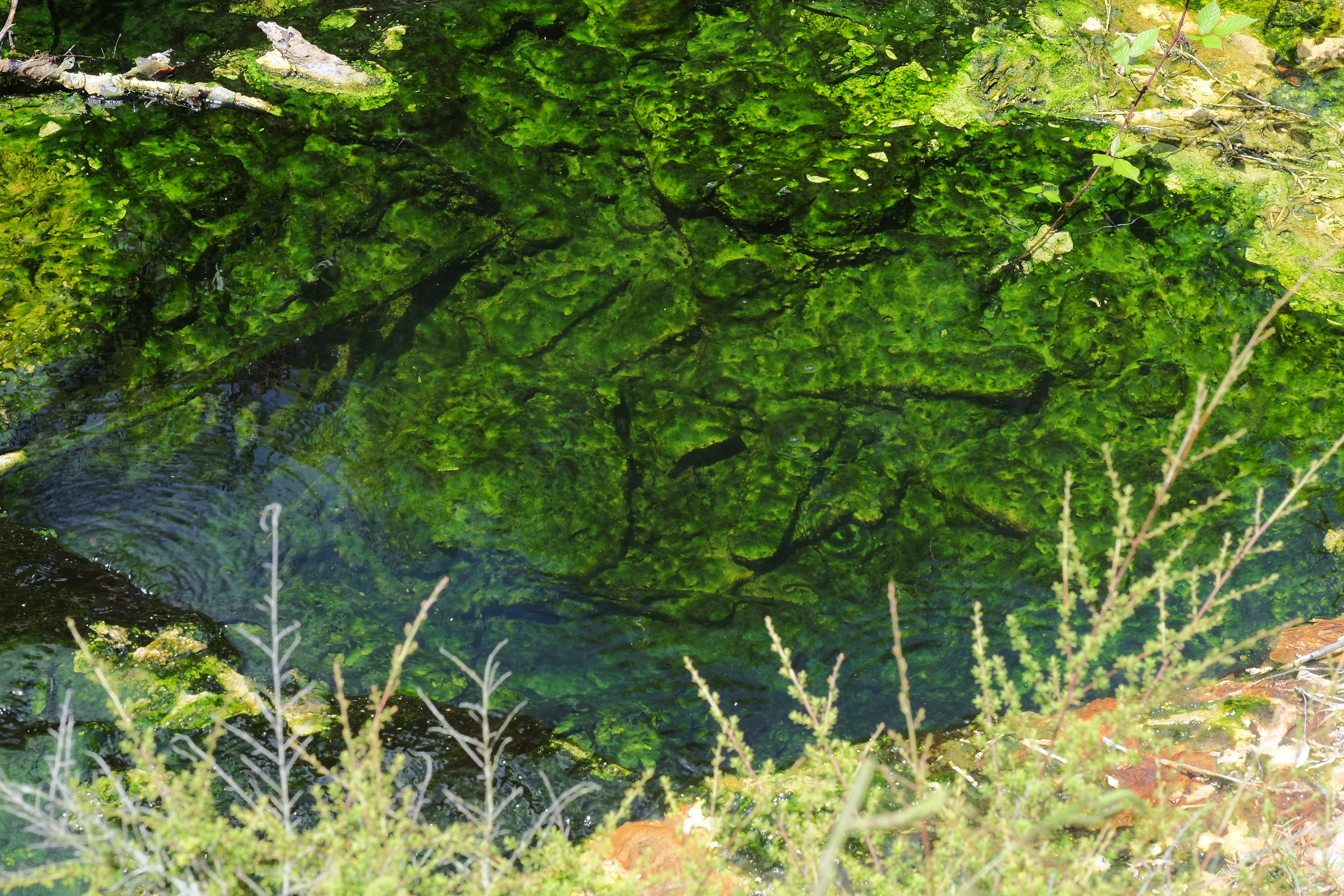
Blue-green algae growing on the sinter floor of Waimangu Stream

The valley's botanically rich ecosystem now includes close to 50 different tree and shrub species, around 50 ferns and allied plants and many herbaceous plants and grasses. Notable species include kanuka adapting a prostrate habit on account of the warm soil temperatures, arching clubmoss capable of growing in soil temperatures of over 50 °C (122 °F), and large populations of threatened fern species. Some of the plants are frost-intolerant and are restricted to hydrothermal areas in New Zealand. Different species of bacteria, such as Chloroflexus, co-exist with blue-green algae in the beds of hot water streams in the valley, in particular the overflow stream from Frying Pan Lake. The algae and bacteria form carpets of vivid hues ranging from orange to bright green and blue depending on water temperature and sulphur concentration. The margins of these streams are often populated by mosses and ferns.

Several non-native plant species have also re-spread into the valley, as have possums, rats and mice. A pest control scheme was introduced in 2000, and efforts are underway to ensure Patiti Island in Lake Rotomahana is kept pest-free.

== Tourism ==
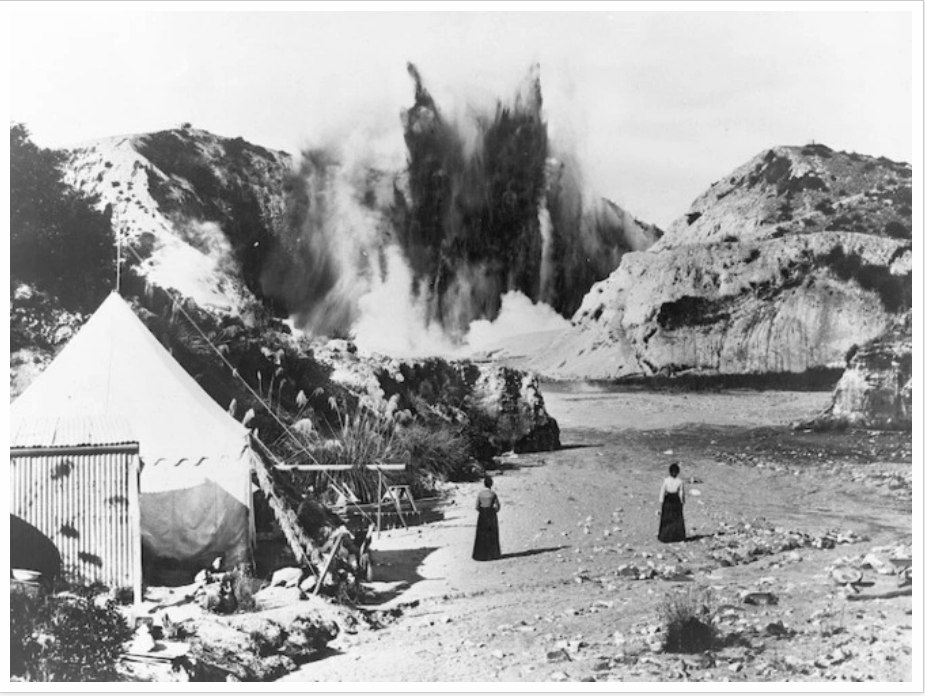
Tent providing tourists with shelter and refreshments (Guide Shepherd) near Waimangu Geyser (1901)

The first significant tourism in the Waimangu Valley area started with the eruptions of the Waimangu Geyser in 1900. Day trip visitors from Rotorua were keen to see the geyser erupting reportedly up to 460 metres (1,510 ft) high until its cessation in late 1904. The first tourism infrastructure appeared in 1901, a tent providing refreshments, shelter, accommodation, photos and first aid equipment if necessary. A tourist trip called the "Round Trip" ran from the summer of 1902–1903.

In 1903, after several close calls, four people were killed by a sudden eruption of the Waimangu Geyser, including 1884 and 1888-89 NZ rugby Hall of Fame representative Joe Warbrick. Despite the dangers, the area remained a popular tourist attraction. The 1917 Echo Crater eruption destroyed a nearby accommodation building and killed two people. This event was the last major event in the valley and changed the landscape by causing Frying Pan Lake to form by mid 1918. The ruins of the accommodation building were pulled down in 1970.

Waimangu's intense hydrothermal activity and diverse features make it an area of international interest for geologists, volcanologists, but also botanists with an interest in the uniquely adapted thermotolerant plants inhabiting zones across a great range of soil acidity levels and temperatures. Scientific monitoring equipment was installed at several sites in the Waimangu Valley in 1970, in particular to investigate the unusual interlinked cyclic variation between Frying Pan Lake and Crater Lake.

Since 1990, tourism in the Department of Conservation-administered Scenic Reserve has been operated by Waimangu Volcanic Valley Ltd under a lease and has won several tourism and environmental awards. The operation includes a courtesy shuttle bus service running along the private gravel road through the valley between the visitor centre and Lake Rotomahana, and a boat cruise on Lake Rotomahana. The bus services three bus stops where the gravel road intersects with the walking track through the valley. It provides a schedule of nine return trips per day – unlimited access to it is included in the entry fee. The boat cruise runs 5–6 scheduled trips daily and is an additional price.

Amenities provided in the valley include a visitor centre, opened in 2000, a cafe and gift shop, and additional toilets near the Warbrick Terrace. The visitor centre and car park are located along Waimangu Road, six kilometres (4 mi) from State Highway 5, fifteen minutes drive south of Rotorua.

The main walk through the Waimangu Volcanic Rift Valley comprises 3.6 kilometres (2.2 mi) of easy-walking wide gravel paths and boardwalks and is accessible via wheelchairs, except for Inferno Crater and the Mt Haszard Hiking Trail. The walk starts at the visitor centre and tends downhill past the Southern Crater, Echo Crate and Frying Pan Lake, past a number of geothermal features, the Marble Terrace and Warbrick Terrace, and finishes at Lake Rotomahana. A short detour of 50 steps leads up to a viewing platform next to Inferno Crater Lake. Due to the attractions along the way, the suggested walking time is 1.5 to 2 hours. The courtesy shuttle bus can be used to return to the visitor centre from any of the three bus stops, or to shortcut between them.

While self-guided walking is the most popular option to explore the geothermal features along the walk, fully guided tours are also available. The 45 minute boat cruise takes in thermal activity along the shores of Lake Rotomahana that can only be seen from the water.

The additional Mt Haszard Hiking Trail was opened in 2005 and although steeper, is of walking track standard. The track follows parts of the early 1900s Waimangu "Round Trip" walking route and continues to climb up from Inferno Crater, skirting Raupo Pond Crater, Fairy Crater and Black Crater, with several good vantage points providing panoramic views over the valley. It adds 20 minutes walking time, but does not pass any notably active geothermal features. It is recommended to visit the geothermal features between Bird's Nest Terrace and the confluence of Haumi Stream and Hot Water Creek beforehand or back-track once the hiking trail re-joins the main path, to not miss out on them.

In August 2013, the Te Ara Ahi bicycle trail was completed. It encompasses Waimangu and makes it possible to ride on a dedicated bicycle path all the way from Rotorua to the Waimangu Volcanic Valley. The 30-kilometre (19 mi) Rotorua-Waimangu section is a 3–4 hour easy-intermediate ride via a concrete bike path and then Waimangu Road.

== Climate ==
Climate data for Waimangu (Waiotapu Forest) (1971–1986 normals, extremes 1951–1986)
| Month | Jan | Feb | Mar | Apr | May | Jun | Jul | Aug | Sep | Oct | Nov | Dec | Year |
|---|---|---|---|---|---|---|---|---|---|---|---|---|---|
| Record high °C (°F) | 33.3 (91.9) | 33.9 (93.0) | 30.4 (86.7) | 26.8 (80.2) | 22.4 (72.3) | 18.3 (64.9) | 16.3 (61.3) | 20.7 (69.3) | 22.6 (72.7) | 27.9 (82.2) | 28.3 (82.9) | 31.9 (89.4) | 33.9 (93.0) |
| Mean maximum °C (°F) | 27.6 (81.7) | 28.1 (82.6) | 24.3 (75.7) | 21.2 (70.2) | 17.9 (64.2) | 15.7 (60.3) | 14.3 (57.7) | 15.5 (59.9) | 18.1 (64.6) | 20.8 (69.4) | 24.2 (75.6) | 25.5 (77.9) | 29.0 (84.2) |
| Mean daily maximum °C (°F) | 22.6 (72.7) | 22.6 (72.7) | 20.5 (68.9) | 17.4 (63.3) | 13.9 (57.0) | 11.5 (52.7) | 10.9 (51.6) | 11.9 (53.4) | 13.9 (57.0) | 16.2 (61.2) | 18.6 (65.5) | 20.6 (69.1) | 16.7 (62.1) |
| Daily mean °C (°F) | 16.7 (62.1) | 16.8 (62.2) | 15.1 (59.2) | 12.1 (53.8) | 8.8 (47.8) | 6.9 (44.4) | 6.2 (43.2) | 7.2 (45.0) | 9.2 (48.6) | 11.1 (52.0) | 13.5 (56.3) | 15.1 (59.2) | 11.6 (52.8) |
| Mean daily minimum °C (°F) | 10.8 (51.4) | 10.9 (51.6) | 9.6 (49.3) | 6.7 (44.1) | 3.6 (38.5) | 2.2 (36.0) | 1.4 (34.5) | 2.5 (36.5) | 4.5 (40.1) | 6.0 (42.8) | 8.3 (46.9) | 9.6 (49.3) | 6.3 (43.4) |
| Mean minimum °C (°F) | 3.4 (38.1) | 4.5 (40.1) | 1.9 (35.4) | −0.3 (31.5) | −3.2 (26.2) | −4.7 (23.5) | −4.7 (23.5) | −4 (25) | −2.1 (28.2) | −0.1 (31.8) | 1.6 (34.9) | 2.6 (36.7) | −5.8 (21.6) |
| Record low °C (°F) | 0.5 (32.9) | −0.4 (31.3) | −2.9 (26.8) | −6.7 (19.9) | −6.4 (20.5) | −6.3 (20.7) | −7.4 (18.7) | −6.7 (19.9) | −6.5 (20.3) | −5.5 (22.1) | −2.8 (27.0) | −1.1 (30.0) | −7.4 (18.7) |
| Average rainfall mm (inches) | 89.4 (3.52) | 97.1 (3.82) | 104.4 (4.11) | 111.4 (4.39) | 111.2 (4.38) | 135.7 (5.34) | 139.7 (5.50) | 125.8 (4.95) | 129.8 (5.11) | 114.2 (4.50) | 90.1 (3.55) | 127.6 (5.02) | 1,376.4 (54.19) |
Source: NIWA (rainfall 1971–2000)
