= List of volcanoes in the Dutch Caribbean =

This is a list of active and extinct volcanoes in the Dutch Caribbean.

Volcano name	Photo	Elevation		Location (island)	Location coordinates	Last eruption
Volcano name	Photo	metres	feet	Location (island)	Location coordinates	Last eruption
Mount Scenery	Photo of Saba taken from the ocean, with Mt. Scenery (the island's summit) visible above a cloud.	870	2 854	Saba	17.63°N 63.23°W	1640 CE
The Quill	Photo of St. Eustatius's volcano, the quill, taken from the hill on the opposite side of the island.	601	1 971	Sint Eustatius	17.478°N 62.960°W	250 CE

== See also ==
- List of volcanoes in the Caribbean
- Lists of volcanoes
- List of mountains and hills in the Netherlands
