= Ficus maitin =

Scientific classification
- Kingdom: Plantae
- Clade: Tracheophytes
- Clade: Angiosperms
- Clade: Eudicots
- Clade: Rosids
- Order: Rosales
- Family: Moraceae
- Genus: Ficus
- Species: F. maitin

Binomial name
- Ficus maitin Pittier

Synonyms
- Ficus depressa Pittier; Ficus ovalifolia Pittier

Species of flowering plant

Ficus maitin is a species of flowering plant in the family Moraceae. It is a tree endemic to Venezuela.

The species was first described by Henri François Pittier in 1937.
