= Morne Plat Pays =

Mountain in Dominica in the Lesser Antilles

Coordinates: 15°15′N 61°21′W

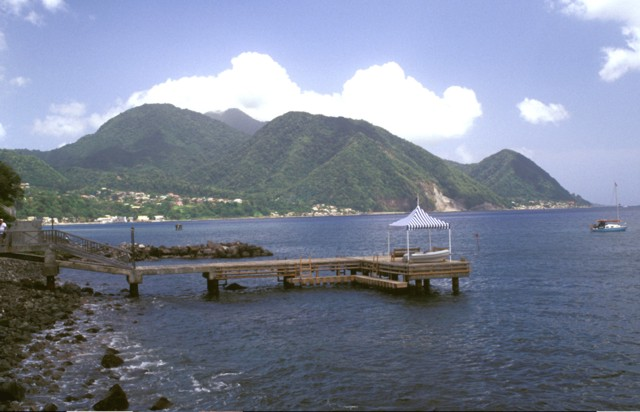

Highest point
- Elevation: 940 m (3,080 ft)

Geography
- Location: Dominica, Caribbean

Geology
- Mountain type: Stratovolcano
- Last eruption: 1270 AD

Morne Plat Pays is a volcano on the island of Dominica. Located on the southern region of the island, the volcano last erupted around the year 1270 AD. Since the mid-18th century, a number of earthquake swarms have occurred near the mountain, but these are not related to Morne Plat Pays' eruptive activity.

== See also ==
- List of mountains of Dominica
- List of volcanoes in Dominica
