= Henri François Pittier =

Swiss geographer and botanist

Henri François Pittier de Fabrega
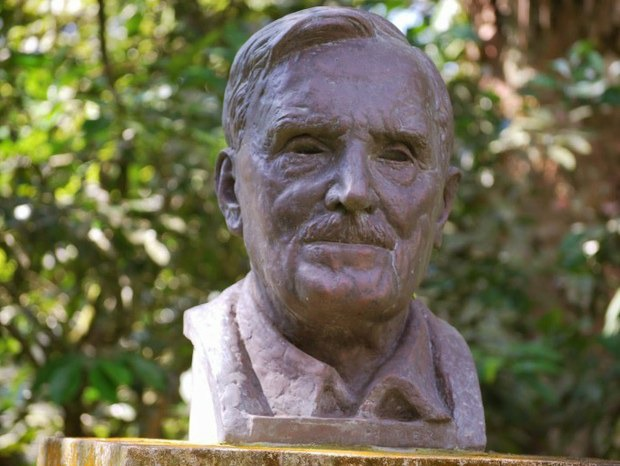
- Born: August 13, 1857; Bex, Switzerland
- Died: January 27, 1950 (aged 92); Caracas, Venezuela
- Education: University of Jena
- Scientific career
- Fields: Geography

Henri François Pittier de Fabrega (August 13, 1857 in Bex, Switzerland – January 27, 1950 in Caracas, Venezuela) was a Swiss geographer and botanist who started Venezuelan National Park history.

== Biography ==
He graduated as an engineer from the University of Jena and moved to Costa Rica in 1887, where he founded the Physical Geographic Institute and an herbarium. With Théophile Alexis Durand he edited the exsiccata-like series Plantae Costaricenses exsiccatae. Pittier collected fungi in Costa Rica which was published as a paper in 1896 by Marietta Hanson Rousseau and Elisa Caroline Bommer, and collected spiders that were detailed or described by A. Getaz in a paper in 1893, and collected at various dates and locations in the prior four years. That latter work also mentions a specimen from Greytown (Nicaragua) also collected by H.Pittier.

Pittier arrived in Venezuela in 1917, where he classified more than 30,000 plants and devoted many years to studying the flora and fauna in the country. Henri Pittier National Park was the first national park established in Venezuela.

The plant genera Pittiera (now considered a synonym of Polyclathra), Pittierella (now considered a synonym of Cryptocentrum) and Pittierothamnus (now considered a synonym of Amphidasya) are named after him. His name is also associated with Pittier's crab-eating rat, Ichthyomys pittieri. and more than 500 species honor him. The Venezuelan government grants the Henri Pittier Order of Merit to Conservation.

== Taxon described by him ==
- See Category:Taxa named by Henri François Pittier

== Works ==
He was the author of more than 300 papers on topics in botany, geography, forestry, anthropology, ethnography, linguistics, geology, and climatology.

- Primitiae florae costaricensis, 1891 (with Théophile Alexis Durand).
- Ensayo lexicográfico sobre la lengua de térraba, 1892.
- Die Sprache der Bribri-Indianer in Costa Rica, 1898 (with Friedrich Müller).
- Manual de agricultura tropical, 1901, (with Henry Alfred Alford Nicholls).
- Kostarika, beiträge zur orographie und hydrographie, 1912.
- Manual de las plantas usuales de Venezuela, 1926.
- Clave analítica de las familias de plantas superiores de la América tropical, 1926.
- Apuntaciones etnológicas sobre los indios bribri, 1938.
- Genera Plantarum Venezuelensium, 1939.
  - Works by Pittier that have been published in English:
- "Ethnographic and linguistic notes on the Paez Indians of Tierra Adentro, Cauca, Columbia", 1907.
- "The Mexican and Central American species of Sapium", 1908.
- "New or noteworthy plants from Colombia and Central America", 1909.
- "A preliminary treatment of the genus Castilla", 1910.
- "On the relationship of the genus Aulacocarpus, with description of a new Panamanian species", 1914.
- "Preliminary revision of the genus Inga", 1916.
- "The middle American species of Lonchocarpus", 1917.
- "New or noteworthy plants from Colombia and Central America [no.] 8", 1922.
- "The Lecythidaceae of Central America", 1927.
  - Books about Henri François Pittier
- "The Role of Geographer and Natural Scientist Henri Francois Pittier (1857–1950) in the Evolution of Geography as a Science in Costa Rica". Leon I. Yacher; Edwin Mellen Press, Jan 1, 2004 - History - 291 pages.

== See also ==
- Henri Pittier - Wikipedia, in Spanish
- Venezuelan bolívar

== Taxon named in his honor ==
- see List
