= Morne Diablotins =

Mountain in Dominica in the Lesser Antilles

Morne Diablotin
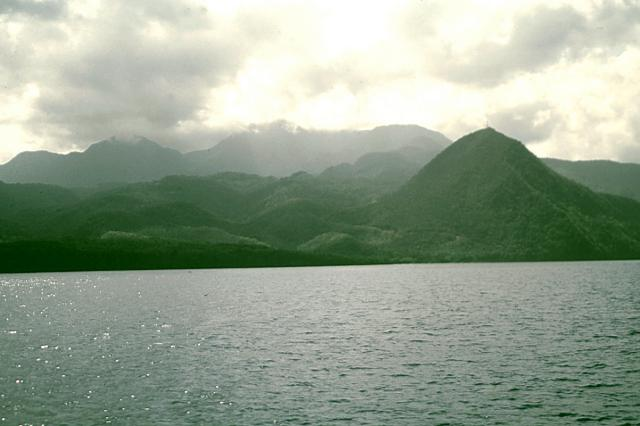
- Morne Diablotin - largest volcano on Dominica.

Highest point
- Elevation: 1,447 m (4,747 ft)
- Prominence: 1,447 m (4,747 ft)
- Listing: Country high point Ribu
- Coordinates: 15°30′12″N 61°23′50″W

Geography
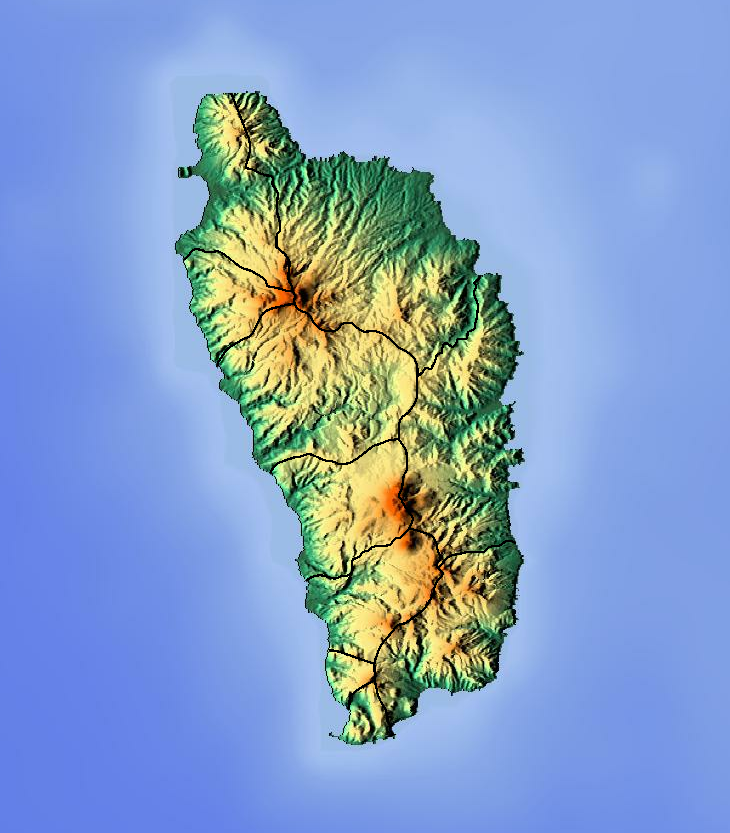
- Location within Dominica
- Location: Dominica, Caribbean

Geology
- Mountain type: Stratovolcano
- Volcanic arc: Lesser Antilles Volcanic Arc
- Last eruption: c. 30,000 years ago

Morne Diablotins is the highest mountain on the Caribbean island of Dominica, and the island's largest and highest volcano. It is the second highest mountain in the Lesser Antilles. Its summit is 1,447 m (4,747 ft) above sea level. It last erupted c. 30,000 years ago.

It takes approximately three hours to reach Morne Diablotins' summit. The first recorded scaling of Morne Diablotin was in the late 1860s, by Scottish physician John Imray.

== Location ==
Morne Diablotins is located within Morne Diablotin National Park. It is located in the northern interior of the island, about 24 kilometres (15 mi) north of Dominica's capital Roseau and about 10 kilometres (6.2 mi) southeast of Portsmouth, the island's second-largest town. The mountain's runoff is the source of the Toulaman River.

== Etymology ==
The mountain was named after the Dominican creole word for the Black-capped Petrel, the diablotin ("little devil"). In the Caribbean, morne is French for a "big isolated hill" or "small mountain".

== Volcanic activity ==
Morne Diablotins has at least five lava domes, which coalesce to form the volcano's summit. Other domes are found to the southeast. Numerous hot springs are found in the Glanvillia neighborhood of Portsmith, near the volcano's northwest flank. These onshore and underwater hotsprings, called the "Glanvillia Hotsprings", are the result of Morne Diablotin's volcanic activity.

No recent eruptions are known. Pyroclastic-flow deposits (known as the Grand Savanne Ignimbrite) extend down the volcano as far as the coast. The eruption that caused these deposits happened during the Quaternary period, and was one of just two Quaternary eruptions (with VEI of 6 or greater) in the Lesser Antilles.

Two severe earthquake swarms in the nineteenth century (1841 and 1893) are attributed to Morne Diablotin, although it's possible they may have originated Morne aux Diables.

== See also ==
- List of mountains of Dominica
- List of volcanoes in Dominica
- List of mountains in the Caribbean
- List of Quaternary volcanic eruptions
