= Bellevue Mountain =

Mountain in Dominica in the Lesser Antilles

Coordinates: 15°37′N 61°26′W

Bellevue Mountain, located in northern Dominica, has an elevation of 1,903 ft (580 m).
