= List of volcanoes in Dominica =

Dominica is an island-nation in the Caribbean that is part of the Lesser Antilles chain of islands. The island has active and extinct volcanoes.

Name	Elevation		Location	Last eruption
Name	Meters	Feet	Coordinates	Last eruption
Morne aux Diables (Devil's Peak)	861	2825	15.612°N 61.43°W	Holocene
Morne Diablotins (Diablotin Mountain)	1430	4692	15.502°N 61.397°W	Holocene
Morne Plat Pays	940	3084	15.255°N 61.341°W	1270
Morne Trois Pitons	1387	4550	15.37°N 61.33°W	920
Morne Watt (Watt Mountain)	1224	4016	15.307°N 61.305°W	1997
