= Morne Watt =

Mountain in Dominica in the Lesser Antilles

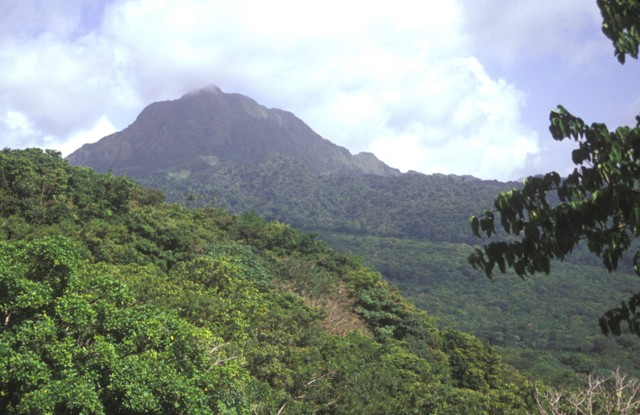
- Morne Watt

Highest point
- Elevation: 1,224 m (4,016 ft)
- Coordinates: 15.307°N 61.305°W

Geography
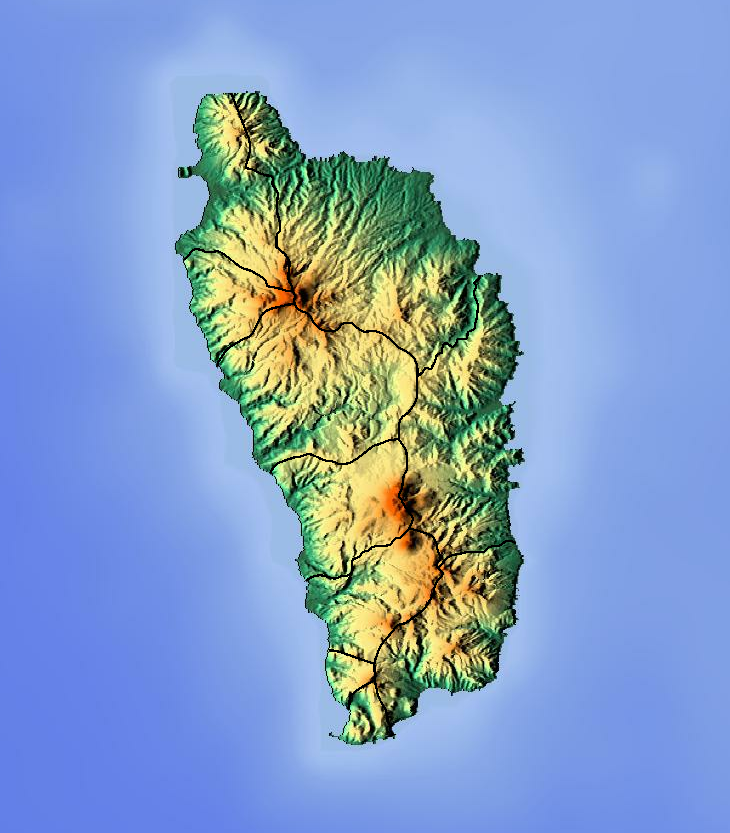
- Location within Dominica
- Location: Dominica

Geology
- Mountain type: Stratovolcano(es)
- Volcanic arc: Lesser Antilles Volcanic Arc
- Last eruption: July 1997

Morne Watt or Watt Mountain is a mountain consisting of one or more stratovolcanoes at the south end of Dominica in the eastern Caribbean Sea. With an elevation of 1,224 m (4,016 ft), it is the third highest mountain in Dominica after Morne Diablotins and Morne Trois Pitons. The mountain is home to the Boiling Lake and Valley of Desolation thermal areas, both of which are the best-known volcanic features in Dominica and major tourist attractions in Morne Trois Pitons National Park.

Morne Watt was the source of a major eruption about 1,300 years ago that produced pyroclastic flows. A VEI-2 phreatic eruption occurred at the Valley of Desolation thermal area in 1880, which deposited ash 10 km (6.2 mi) away from the mountain. This was followed by a smaller VEI-1 phreatic eruption in July 1997. The 1880 and 1997 explosions are the only historically confirmed Dominican eruptions.

== See also ==
- List of volcanoes in Dominica
