= John Imray =

John Imray (11 January 1811 – 22 August 1880) was a medical doctor, legislator, agriculturist and botanist from the Dominican Republic.

== Life ==
John Imray, MD was born in Craig, Angus, Scotland on 11 January 1811, a son of James Imray and Mary Keith Porteous; his mother was a sister of Bishop Beilby Porteus or Porteous.

In 1831 he obtained the diploma of the Royal College of Surgeons at Edinburgh.

The following year he travelled to Dominica, to join his older brother Keith, who was already in practice there. “By skill and hard work, Dr [John] Imray soon became the leading physician in Dominica” and remained so throughout his career.

Imray was able to combine his medical skills with those of a botanist. For example, in 1848 he published Observations on the Characters of Endemic Fever in the Island of Dominica, a detailed daily account of several cases he had treated, and written about with great clarity. The typical treatment was various combinations of calomel, quinine and camphor, with purgatives and the raising of one or more blisters.

In contrast, in 1862 Imray published The Useful Woods of the Island of Dominica, a detailed description of 169 trees: no. 11 on the list reads “Adegon, (Ardisia sp.) Large tree 4 or 5 feet in diameter; useful for all purposes; boards, planks, mill work; house work; ship-building, shingles; lasts well in water.”

For nearly 50 years he corresponded with Sir William Hooker, and his son, directors of the Royal Botanic Gardens, Kew. Many plants were named in his honour.

Forty three years after arriving in Dominica, Imray was joined by Dr Henry A Alford Nicholls, an English physician who had also qualified in Scotland. It turned out that Nicholls shared many interests with Imray, especially local diseases and horticulture.

Dr Imray played a prominent part in the politics of Dominica and, "as the leading member of the Executive Council, he was the trusted and honoured adviser of all the governors." He lived at St Aroment, an estate just outside Roseau. After his death the property passed to Nicholls and his growing family.

John Imray did not marry. He died of dysentery at his home at St Aroment on 22 August 1880. After funeral obsequies at Dr Nicholls' residence the following day he was buried at St George's Church, Roseau. To the north of the west door his memorial reads:-

IN MEMORY OF
THE HONORABLE JOHN IMRAY, M.D.
BORN IN FORFARSHIRE, SCOTLAND JANUARY 11TH 1811
DIED AT ST. AROMENT, DOMINICA AUGUST 22ND, 1880,
THE DECEASED LEFT SCOTLAND IN 1832 AND ARRIVED
IN DOMINICA TOWARDS THE CLOSE OF THAT YEAR.

The memorial was "Erected by W. Macintyre and W. Stedman his friends". The two men were Lloyd's of London’s Dominica Agents, in 1889 and 1891, respectively.

A ward in the Princess Margaret Hospital in the capital was named after Imray. A new hospital, funded by China and to be named Dominica China Friendship Hospital, is being constructed in seven phases on the same site. The first section opened in September 2019.

== Other publications ==
- Observations Illustrating the Characters of a Febrile Epidemic which Prevailed in Dominica in 1838.
- Observations on the Mal d'Estomac or Cachexia Africana, as It Takes Place among the Negroes of Dominica
- Observations on the Nature, Causes, and Treatment of Yellow Fever
- Monkeys in the West Indies
