= Morne aux Diables =

Mountain in Dominica in the Lesser Antilles

Coordinates: 15°37′N 61°26′W

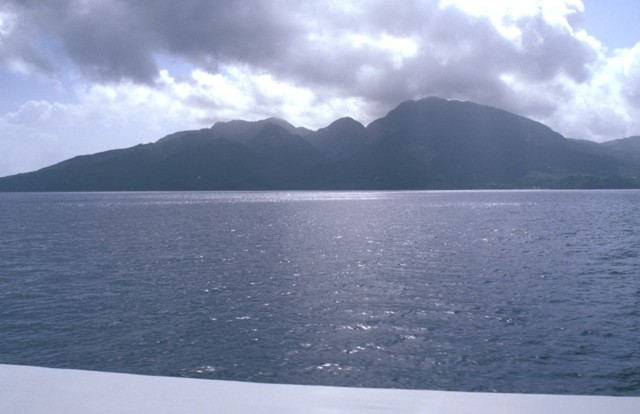
- Morne aux Diables in 2002

Highest point
- Elevation: 861 m (2,825 ft)

Geography
- Location: Dominica, Caribbean

Geology
- Mountain type: Stratovolcano
- Last eruption: Unknown; possibly late Pleistocene or Holocene era

Morne aux Diables, also known as Devil's Peak, is a volcano on the island of Dominica and the volcanic formation is the northernmost peak on the island. The volcano is considered dormant, with no unusual volcanic activity reported aside from a swarm of small earthquakes detected in 2009–2010. Sulfur springs are present near the volcano.

== See also ==
- List of mountains of Dominica
- List of volcanoes in Dominica
