= Waimangu Geyser =

Extinct geyser in New Zealand

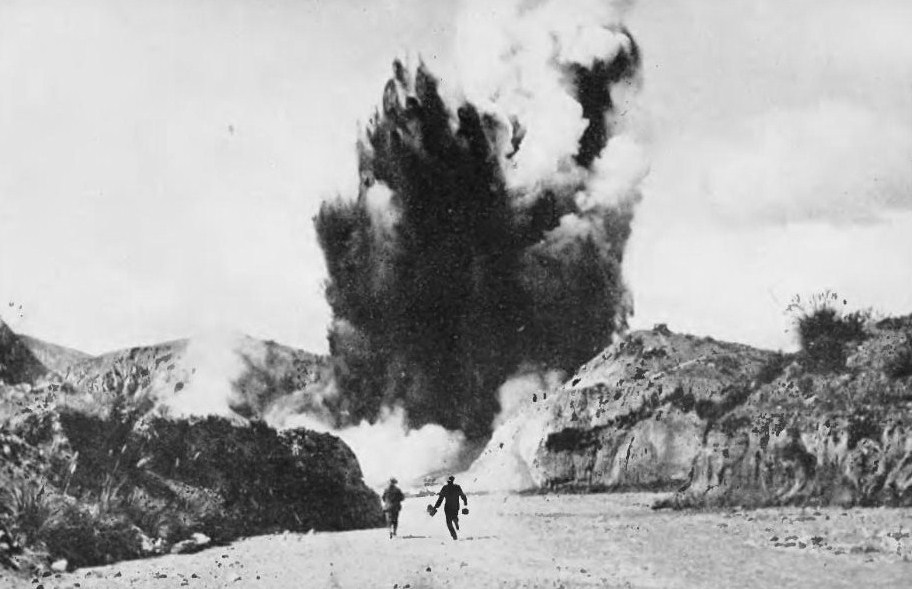
- Eruption of Waimangu Geyser in 1903
- Interactive map of Waimangu Geyser
- Location: near Rotorua, New Zealand
- Coordinates: 38°17′S 176°24′E
- Type: Fountain geyser
- Eruption height: up to 1,500 feet (460 m)
- Frequency: ~36 hours (while active before 1908)

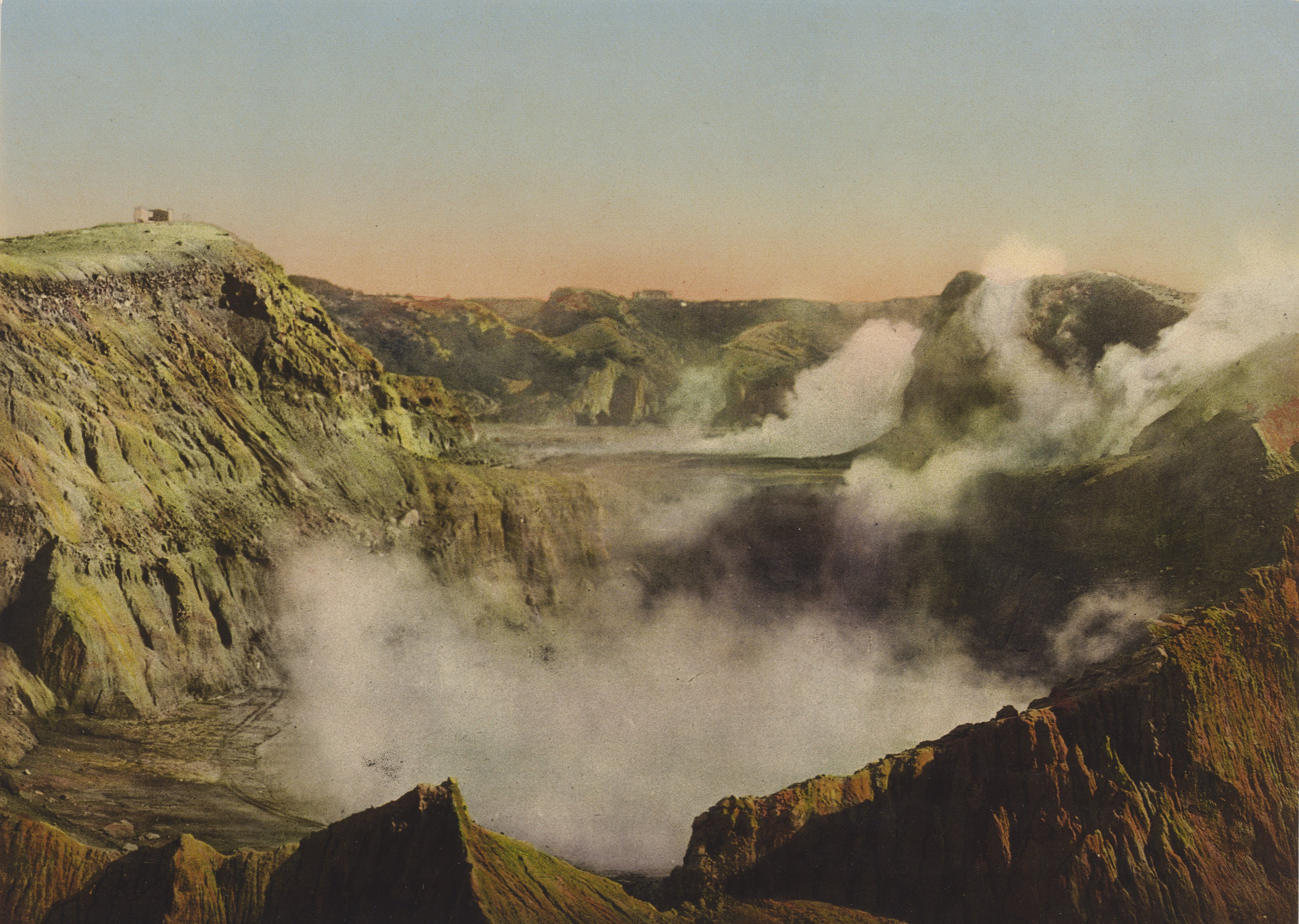
Waimangu Geyser area around 1910

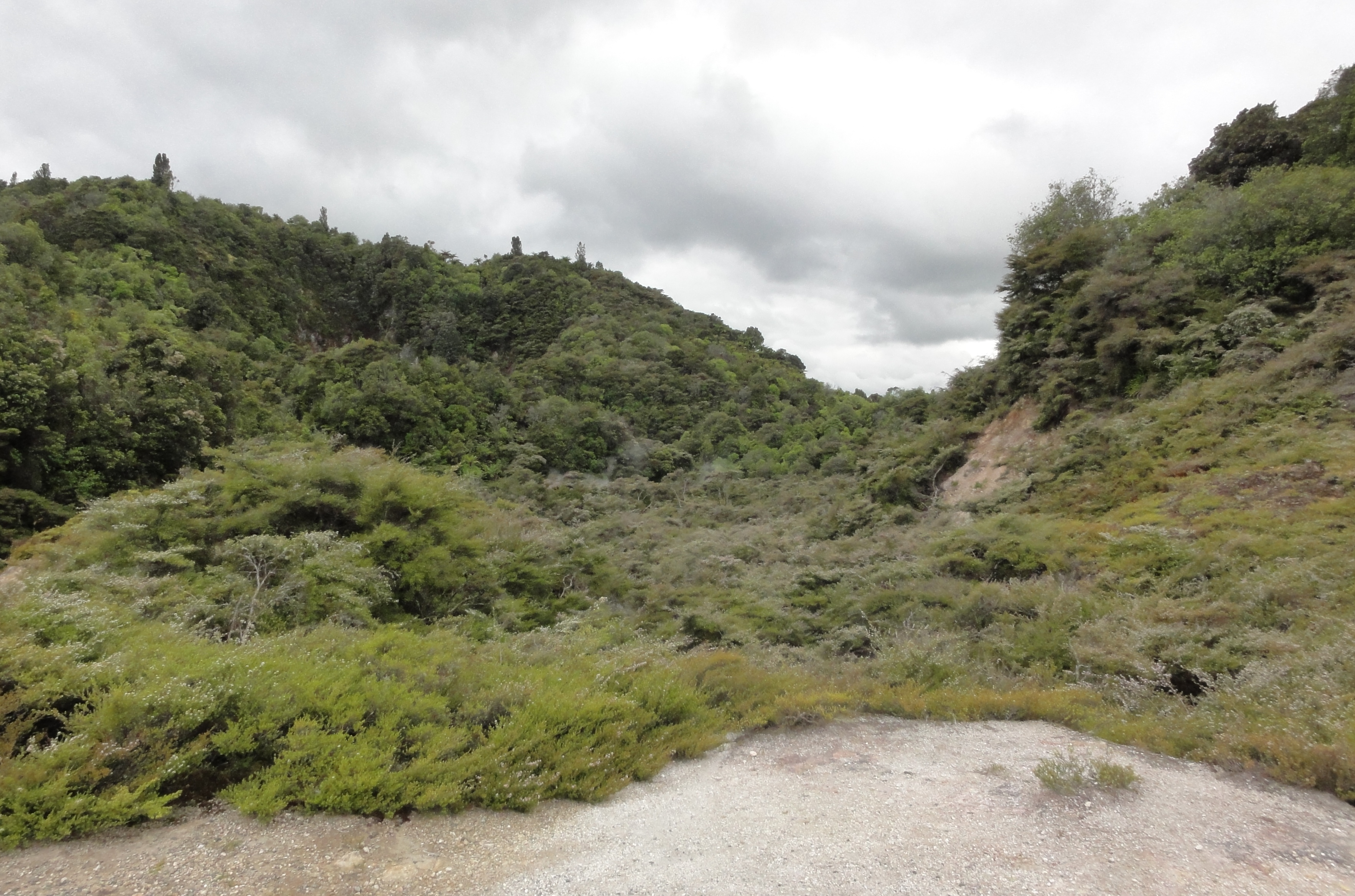
Geyser site in 2011

The Waimangu Geyser, located near Rotorua in New Zealand, was for a time the most powerful geyser in the world.

The geyser began erupting in 1900. Its eruptions were observed reaching up to 1,500 feet (460 m) in height, (Note: Other consistent sources exist. Another source states 450 m so this statement may be due to rounding of the original figure. The observation at the time was made in imperial units. Multiple photographs exist that confirm this likely height.) and it excited worldwide interest. Day trip visitors from Rotorua were keen to see the geyser erupting regularly for 5–6 hours out of a cycle of about 36 hours, and a tourist trip called the "Round Trip" ran from the summer of 1902/1903. The geyser was the catalyst for tourism to the Waimangu Valley.

Its workings were apparently created by the great 1886 Mount Tarawera eruption. The water expelled by the geyser was black with rocks and mud from the surrounding terrain, so the indigenous Māori people named the geyser Waimangu, meaning 'Black Waters'. The geyser gave its name to the surrounding geothermal region, the Waimangu Volcanic Rift Valley.

Joseph Perry of the Limelight Department of the Salvation Army filmed the Waimangu Geyser in action.

In August 1903, tourist guide Alfred Warbrick measured the depth of the 260-by-430-foot (80 m × 130 m) geyser lake at only 48 feet (15 m) when he launched a rowboat on the lake as a result of a dare. The lake's shallow depth was attributed to much of the ejected solid material falling back into the vent each time.

On 30 August 1903, New Zealand rugby international Joe Warbrick, David McNaughton, and sisters Ruby and Catherine Nicholls were killed after venturing close to the edge of the geyser, having ignored requests from Warbrick's brother Alfred to return to a safe distance. The four were scalded and then swept away in a sudden violent eruption.

In mid-1904, the geyser became dormant for several weeks and subsequent eruptions were shorter and weaker until they stopped on 1 November 1904. (Note: The geyser became a hot spring in 1904 that stopped all geothermal activity in 1908) This coincided with a landslide that changed the water table of Lake Tarawera by several metres. While it was hypothesized that this was the cause for the extinction of the geyser, later studies found no apparent physical connection between these two events.

The geyser became extinct in 1908. Afterwards, hydrothermal activity in the nearby Echo Crater increased, leading to eruptions in the crater in 1915, 1917, and 1924.
