= Boiling Lake =

Lake in Morne Trois Pitons National Park, Dominica

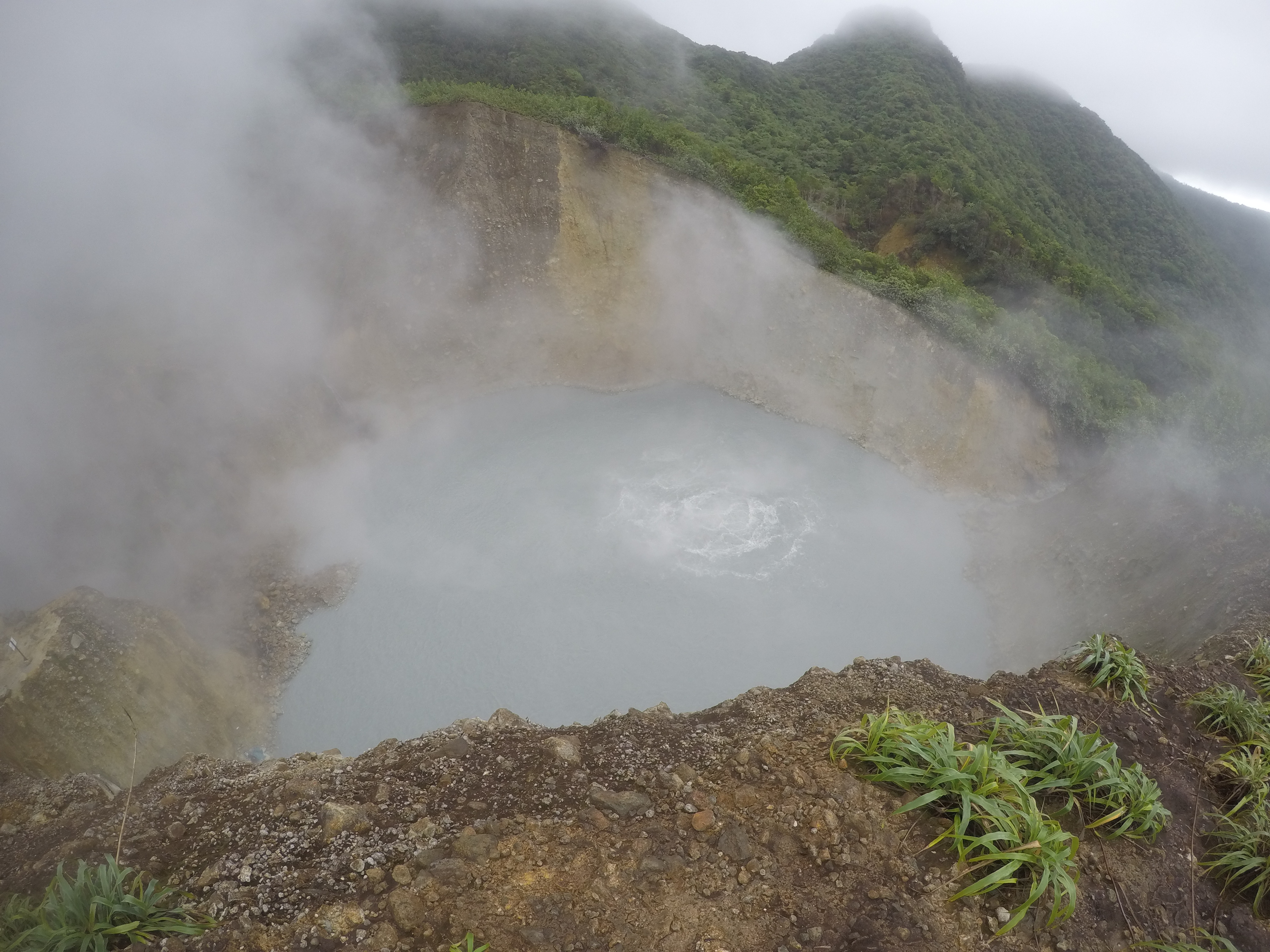

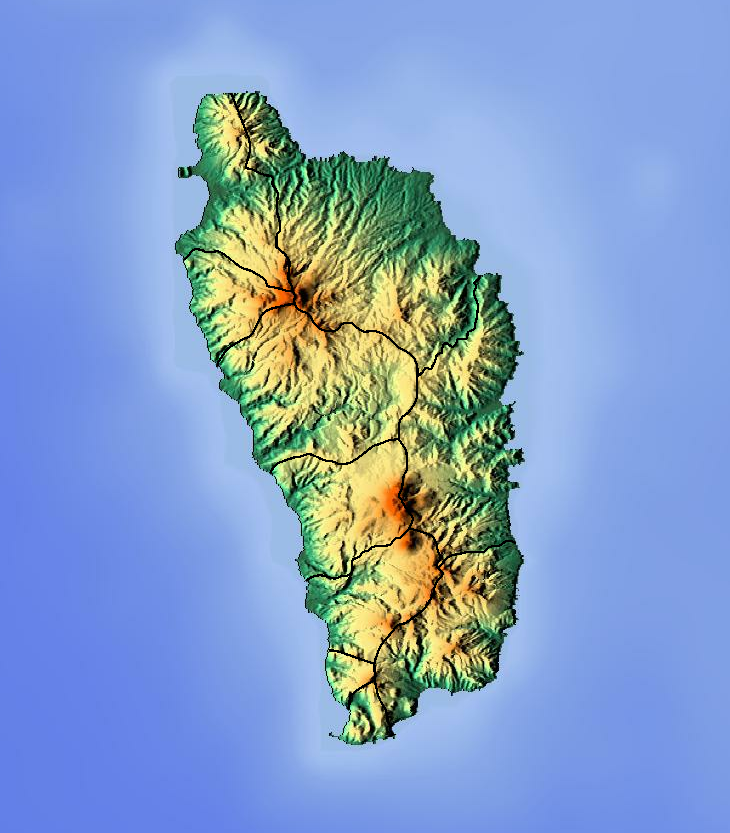
- Location within Dominica
- Location: Morne Trois Pitons National Park, Saint Patrick Parish, Dominica
- Coordinates: 15°19′06″N 61°17′39″W
- Type: flooded fumarole
- Basin countries: Dominica
- Max. length: c. 60 m (200 ft)
- Max. width: c. 60 m (200 ft)
- Max. depth: 12-15 m (40-50 ft)
- Water volume: 126.88 cubic meters (4,480.72 cubic feet)
- Surface elevation: 800 m (2,600 ft)

The Boiling Lake is a flooded fumarole located in Morne Trois Pitons National Park, a World Heritage Site on the island of Dominica. The lake, located 6.5 miles (10.5 km) east of Dominica's capital Roseau, is filled with bubbling greyish-blue water that is usually enveloped in a cloud of vapour. The Boiling Lake is approximately 200 to 250 feet (60 to 75 m) across and is the second-largest hot lake in the world after Frying Pan Lake, located in Waimangu Valley near Rotorua, New Zealand.

== History ==
The first recorded sighting of the lake was in 1870 by Edmund Watt and Henry Alfred Alford Nicholls, two Englishmen working in Dominica at that time. In 1875, Henry Prestoe, a government botanist, and Nicholls were commissioned to investigate this natural phenomenon. They measured the water temperature and found it to range from 180 to 197 °F (82–92 °C) along the edges, but could not measure the temperature at the centre where the lake is actively boiling.

Periodically, there have been fluctuations in the level and activity of the lake. In the 1870s it was deep; after a phreatic eruption nearby in 1880, the lake disappeared and formed a fountain of hot water and steam. Another phreatic eruption lowered the lake level by some 33 feet (10 m) from December 2004 to April 2005; later the lake level rose again, refilling the lake in just one day. The rapid draining and refilling of the lake implies that it is suspended well above the local water table and that a continuous flux of steam or gas generated by an underlying magmatic intrusion drives water up into the lake. A disturbance to the supply of gas can cause the lake to drain through the porous connection that normally allows steam to rise and heat the lake.

== Geology ==
The lake rests at the bottom of a large sinkhole-like basin. More accurately, it is a flooded fumarole, generally located within the vicinity of a volcano, which emits steam and gases escaping from molten magma below. Currently, the lake is viewable from a broad, cliff-top ledge about 100 feet (30 m) directly above its shore. High rock walls surround and create the basin.

The lake's grayish-blue water is easily viewed in its perpetual rolling-boil state which looks like a giant pot of water cooking and steaming on a stove. The basin's water is replenished by rainfall and two small streams which drain into the area. The water then seeps down to the magma and is heated to the boiling point. The trail leads through another volcanic area called the Valley of Desolation. The air around the area is hot, steamy and moist, supported by the sharp, acrid smell of sulphur. The area is known to have been filled with vapors and gases that escape from bubbling and boiling sulfur-water pots, small spraying and hissing geysers, cracks and holes, and a small stream that runs through and beneath the terrain. Tiny invisible sprays of steam will easily scald an ankle or foot.

== Hiking ==
There is no road leading directly to the lake. The lake is accessible via the Boiling Lake Trail, which is an 8.1-mile (13 km) 6-hour hike between the lake and the nearest road.

The hike can be divided into three parts that take about one hour each:

- Part I starts in Laudat, by Titou Gorge and ends at Breakfast River, where hikers can fill up with fresh water.
- Part II continues up Morne Nicholls which has an altitude of 3,168 feet (966 m), and ends at the top of the Valley of Desolation.
- Part III starts with a dangerous descent into the Valley of Desolation, followed by a long hike past sulfur springs and hot pools, until finally reaching a peak overlooking the Boiling Lake.

Two members of a three-man hiking party – a hiker and a Dominican guide – died at the Boiling Lake in 1900 after being asphyxiated by a sudden release of volcanic gases and falling to their deaths.

On 6 July 2007, adventure-filmmaker George Kourounis became the first person to ever cross Boiling Lake from above, suspended by ropes over the most violently boiling section. This event was filmed for the TV series Angry Planet.

A 6.6 km cable car project with 65 cabins (10 people in each) started in 2022 to improve access for cruise ship passengers.

== See also ==
- Hot spring
- List of hot springs
- List of trails in Dominica
