= List of rivers of Dominica =

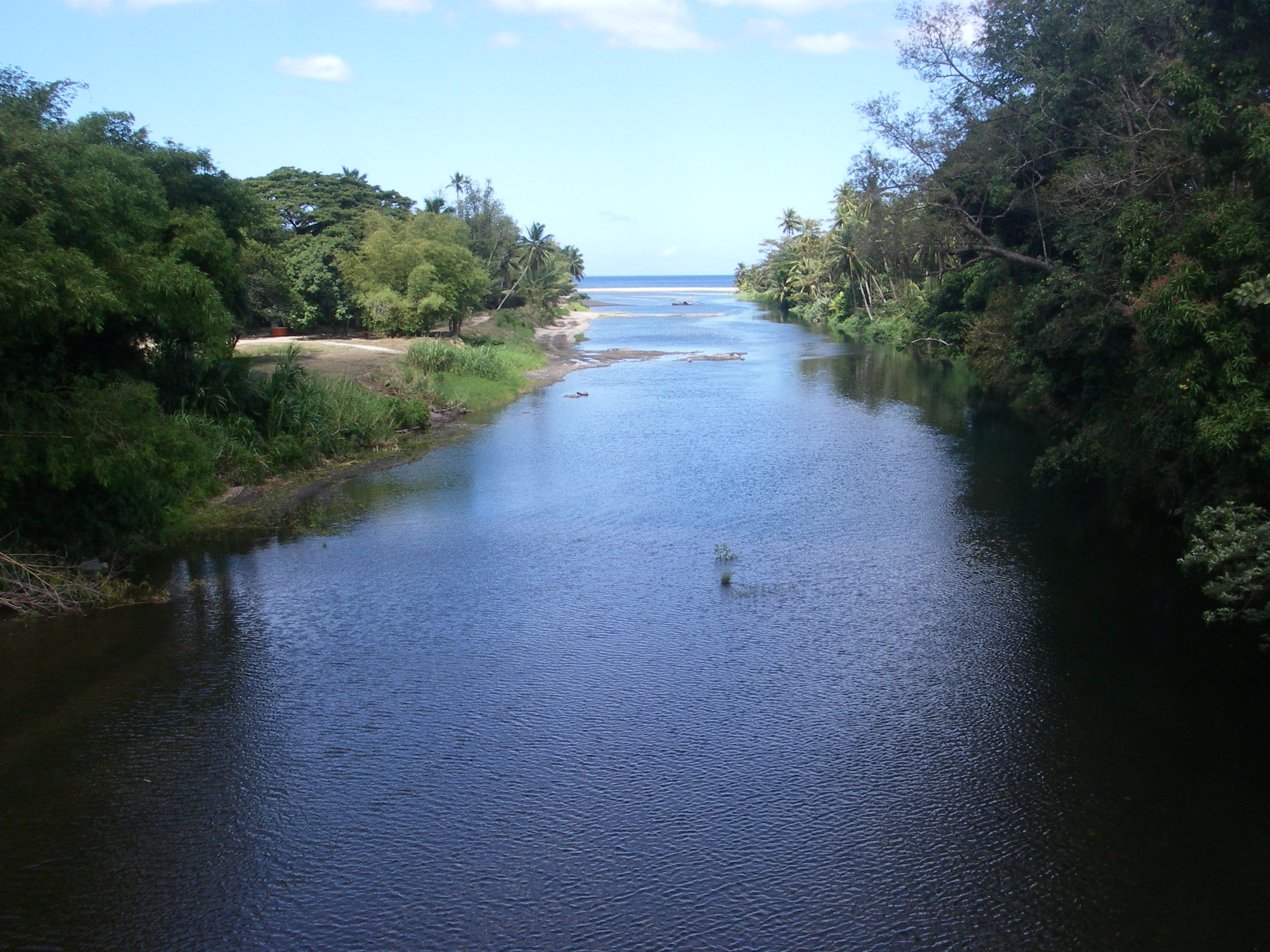
Layou River

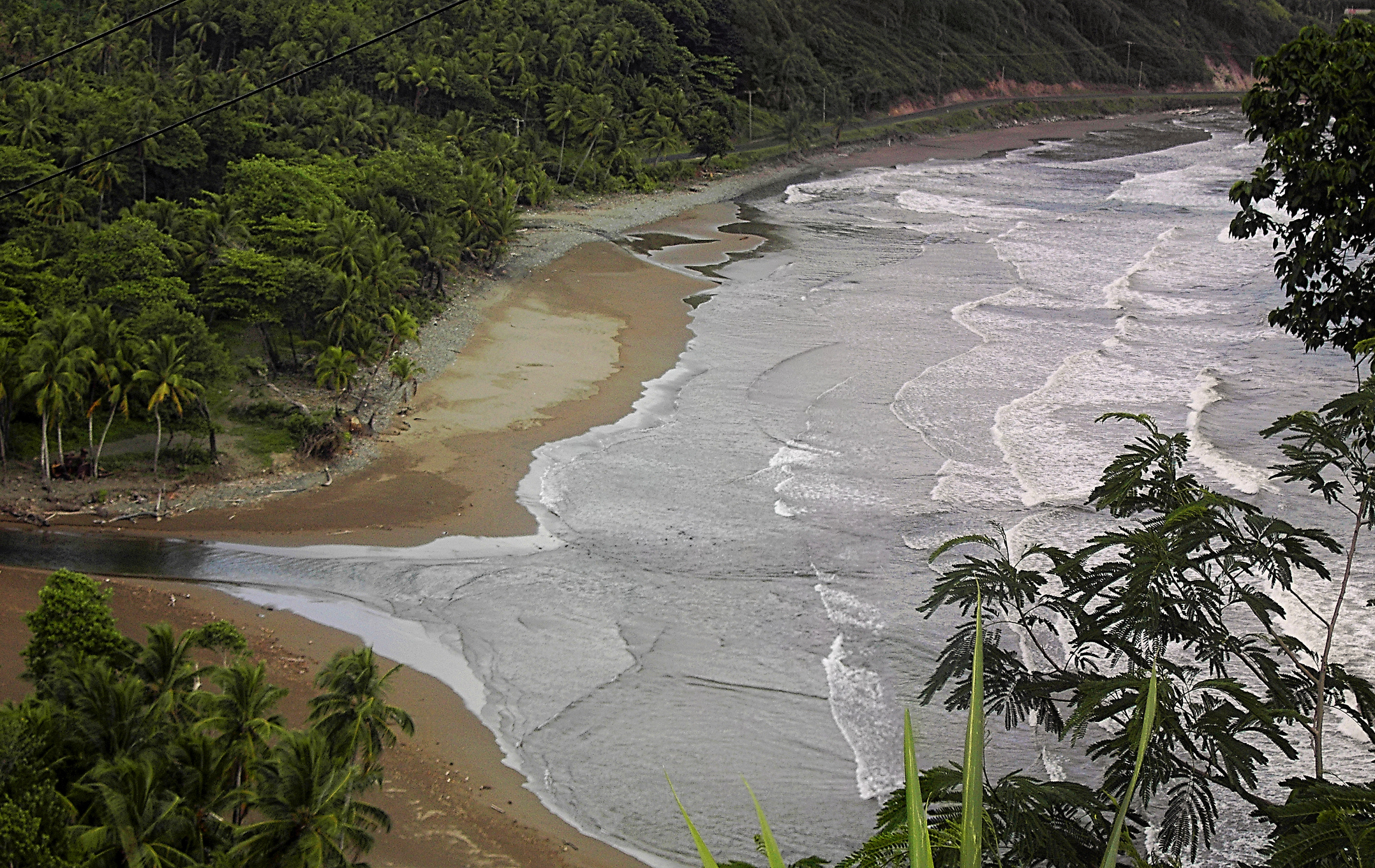
The Pagua River at its outlet into Pagua Bay, on Dominica's east coast.

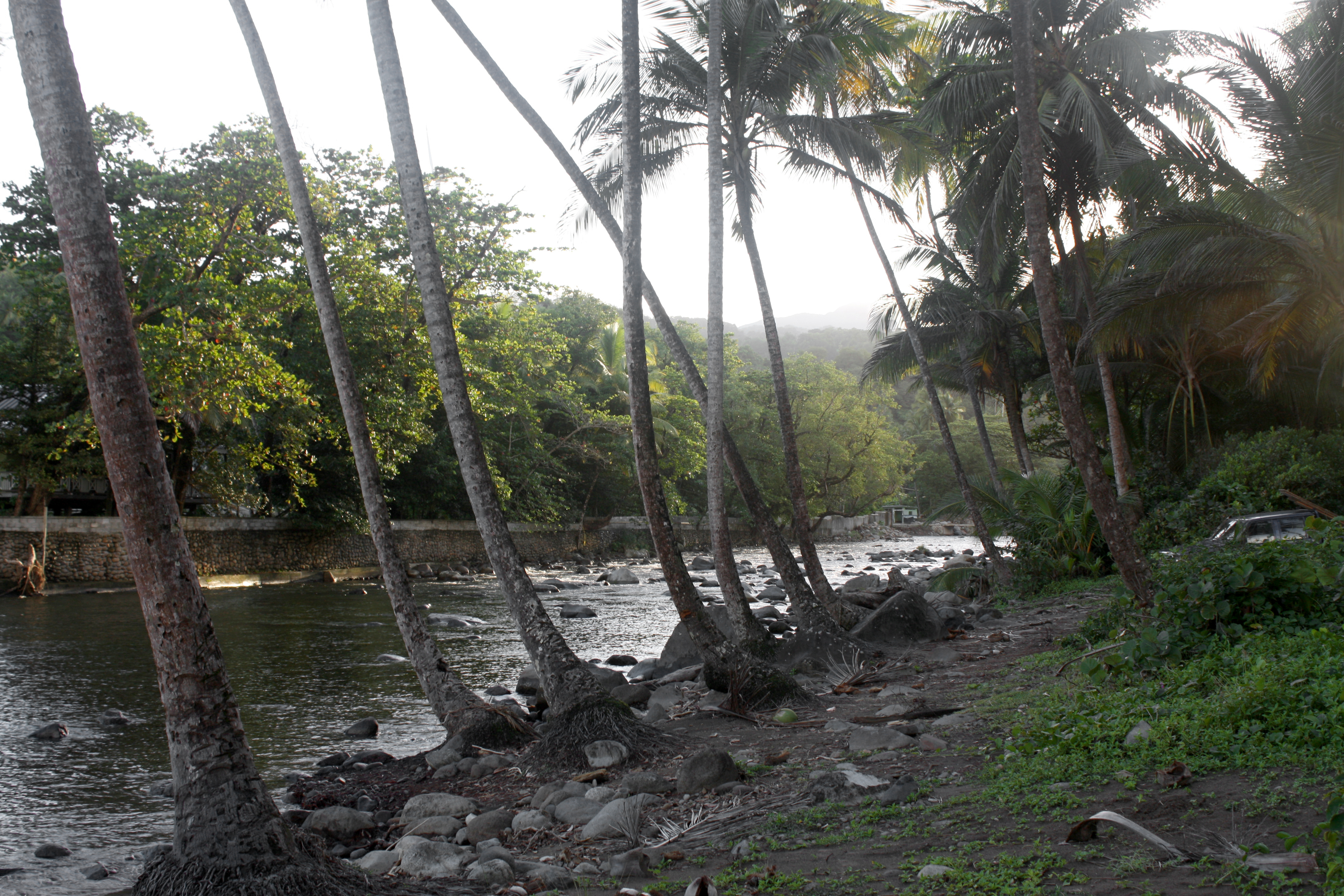
The Rosalie River, located on Dominica’s east coast

Dominica is an island-nation in the Caribbean that is part of the Lesser Antilles chain of islands.

- Anse Du Mé River
- Aouya River
- Balthazar River
- Barry River
- Batali River (Batalie River)
- Beauplan River
- Belfast River
- Bell Hall River
- Belle Fille River
- Bellibu River
- River Bibiay
- Bioche River
- Blenheim River
- Boeri River
- Boetica River
- River Bouleau
- River Bway
- Canal River
- River Canari
- Canefield River
- Cario River
- Castle Bruce River
- Check Hall River
- River Claire
- Clarke's River
- Colihaut River
- Coulibistrie River
- Crayfish River
- Demitrie River
- Delaford River
- Douce River
- Dublanc River
- Eden River
- Espagnole River
- Fond Figues River
- Geneva River
- River Gillon
- Good Hope River
- Hampstead River
- Indian River
- River Jack
- Lagon River
- Lagoon River
- Lamoins River (Lamothe River)
- La Ronde River
- Layou River
- Loubiere River
- Macoucheri River
- Mahaut River
- Mahaut River
- Malabuka River
- Mamelabou River
- Maréchal River
- Massacre River
- Matthieu River
- Melville Hall River
- Mero River
- Micham River
- North River
- River Ouayaneri
- Pagua River
- Penton River
- Perdu Temps River
- Picard River
- Point Mulâtre River
- River Quanery
- Rosalie River
- Roseau River
- Saint Joseph River
- Saint Marie River
- Saint Sauveur River
- Salée River (Dominica)
- Salisbury River
- Sari Sari River
- Savane River
- River Subaya
- River Sarisari
- Taberi River
- Tarou River
- Thibaud River
- Torité River
- Toucari River
- Toulaman River
- Trois Pitons River
- White River (River Blanche)
- Woodford Hill River
