= La Plaine (Dominica constituency) =

- Constituency for the House of Assembly of Dominica
- Electorate: 2,562 (2016)

Current constituency
- Created: 1975
- Number of members: 1
- Representative: Cassandra Williams (DLP)

La Plaine is a parliamentary electoral district in Dominica. It includes the areas of Boetica, Delices and La Plaine. It came into effect in time for the 1975 Dominican general election. It has been represented by Cassandra Williams of the Dominica Labour Party since the 2022 general election.

== Constituency profile ==
The constituency was established prior to the 1975 Dominican general election. There was an electorate of 2,562 as of November 2016. It includes the areas of Boetica, Delices and La Plaine. The boundary extends from Freshwater Lake, down the Taberi River to the sea, along the Point Mulâtre River to River Jack and from the source of the River Jack to Morne Anglais back to Freshwater Lake.

== Representatives ==
This constituency has elected the following members of the House of Assembly of Dominica:

| Election | Years | Member | Party | Notes |
|---|---|---|---|---|
| 1975 | 24 March 1975 – 21 July 1980 | Henckell Christian | DLP | |
| 1980 | 21 July 1980 – 12 June 1995 | Heskeith Alexander | DFP | |
| 1995 | 12 June 1995 – 18 December 2009 | Ronald Milner Green | UWP | |
| 2009 | 18 December 2009 – 6 December 2019 | Petter Saint-Jean | DLP | |
| 2019 | 6 December 2019 – 6 December 2022 | Kent Edwards | DLP | |
| 2022 | 6 December 2022– Present | Cassandra Williams | DLP | |

== Election results ==
=== Elections in the 2010s ===
2019 general election: La Plaine
| Party | Candidate | Votes | % | ±% |
|---|---|---|---|---|
| DLP | Kent Edwards | 742 | 52.74 | |
| UWP | Francisca Joseph | 665 | 47.26 | |
| Majority | | 77 | 5.47 | |
| Turnout | | 1,407 | | |
| DLP hold | | Swing | | |

2014 general election: La Plaine
| Party | Candidate | Votes | % | ±% |
|---|---|---|---|---|
| DLP | Petter Saint-Jean | 842 | 54.39 | |
| UWP | Ronald Milner Green | 706 | 45.61 | |
| Majority | | 136 | 8.79 | |
| Turnout | | 1,548 | 59.47 | |
| DLP hold | | Swing | | |
