= Belle Fille River =

River in Dominica

Coordinates: 15°25′N 61°16′W

The Belle Fille River is a river on the Caribbean island of Dominica.

== Geography ==
The Belle Fille River is essentially the upper reaches of the Castle Bruce River, before the Raymondstone River flows with it in the Castle Bruce Valley.

The sources of the Belle Fille River are located on the northern slope of the Morne Trois Pitons. A southeastern spring stream forms the Emerald Pool with a small waterfall. The spring streams unite shortly afterwards and the river runs in a curvy course to the northeast.

Due to its sources, the Belle Fille River reaches close to the catchment area of the Layou River in the west, to the north the catchment area of the Pagua River adjoins and to the south the catchment area of the Rosalie River, as well as the much smaller catchment area of the Saint Sauveur River, which, however, is completely cut off from the other river systems in the crater of Saint Sauveur.

== See also ==
- List of rivers of Dominica
