= Beauplan River =

River in Dominica

The Beauplan River is a river on the Caribbean island of Dominica. Administratively, it is located in Saint Andrew Parish.

== Geography ==
The Beauplan River originates on the eastern slope of the Morne Turner, just north of the border with the Saint John Parish, at about 600 m above sea level and flows towards the north. It absorbs some smaller inflows, including from Maikay Estate. It crosses Chillenbain Estate and Beauplan Estate. East of La Source, it flows into it on a large southern loop of the Blenheim River.

To the west is the catchment area of the Moutine Ravine and Dunkin Ravine and to the east is the catchment area of the Bras de Fort River (Batibou River). The stream is about 8.7 km long.

== See also ==
- List of rivers of Dominica
