= Mahaut River =

Mahaut River may refer to:

- Mahaut River (St. Paul), Dominica
- Mahaut River (St. David), Dominica
- Mahaut River (Saint Lucia), Laborie Quarter, Saint Lucia

== See also ==
- Mahaut (disambiguation)
