= Barry River =

River in Dominica

The Barry River is a river in the Saint John Parish of Dominica.

== Geography ==
The Barry River originates from many spring rivers that form on the southern slopes of Morne Les Héritiers and Morne Brulés, as well as Morne Morson. It flows west and turns south on the eastern edge of Portsmouth, still flows around the Sugarloaf Estate on the north side and then flows into the Indian River, just south of Portsmouth.

To the north of the river, the catchment area of the South Branch River, a tributary of the North River, joins it.

== See also ==
- List of rivers of Dominica
