= Douce =

Douce may refer to:

== People ==
- Douce I, Countess of Provence (c. 1090–1127)
- Douce II, Countess of Provence (died 1172)
- Francis Douce (1757–1834), English antiquary
- Roland Douce (1939–2018), plant biologist

== Rivers ==
- Douce River (Dominica)
- Douce River (Grenada)

== Other ==
- Douce noir, French wine grape that is also known as Charbono in California and Bonarda in Argentina
- Douce (film), a 1943 French film
