= Al Ansaar Mosque =

Mosque in Portsmouth, Saint John, Dominica

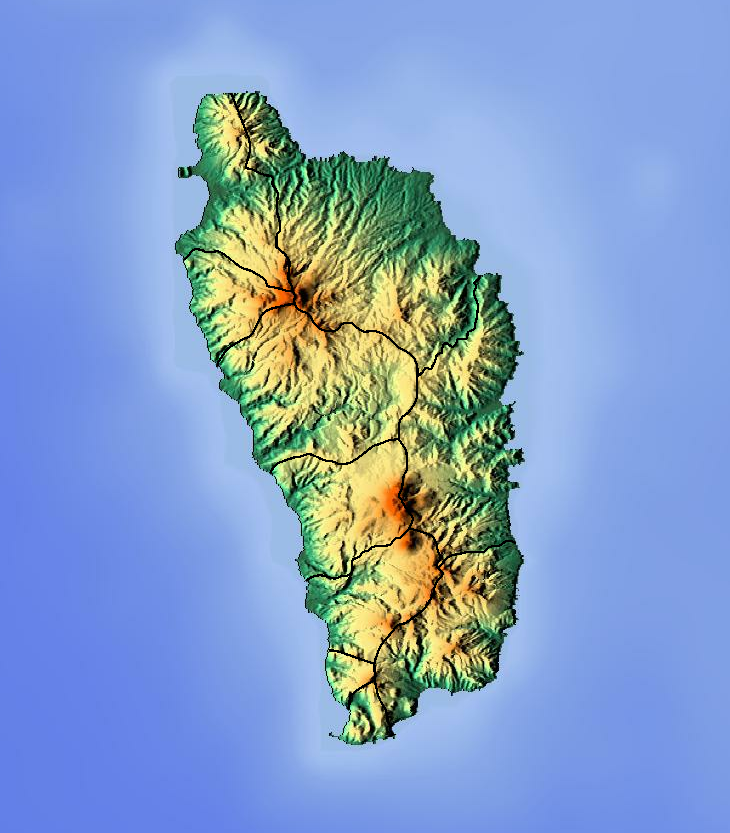
- Location within Dominica

Religion
- Affiliation: Islam

Location
- Location: Portsmouth, Saint John, Dominica
- Interactive map of Al Ansaar Mosque
- Coordinates: 15°33′19″N 61°27′32″W

Architecture
- Type: mosque
- Established: 2004

The Al Ansaar Mosque is a mosque in Portsmouth, Saint John Parish, Dominica.

== History ==
The mosque was funded and established in 2004 by the students of Ross University School of Medicine and their families.

== See also ==
- Islam in Dominica
