= Douce River =

Douce River may refer to:

- Douce River (Dominica)
- Douce River (Grenada)
