= Balthazar River =

Balthazar River may refer to:

- Balthazar River (Dominica)
- Balthazar River (Grenada)
