= Canari =

Canari may refer to:

- Canari, Haute-Corse, a commune in France
- River Canari, in Dominica
- Cañari, an ethnic group in Ecuador
- Cañari language, formerly spoken by the Cañari

== See also ==
- Canari noir, a red wine grape
- Canaris (disambiguation)
- Canary (disambiguation)
