= Laguna Lake =

Laguna Lake (Spanish: lake, lagoon, or depression) may refer to:

- Laguna de Bay, the largest lake in the Philippines
- Laguna Lake (California), a lake in northern California, United States
- Laguna Lake (San Luis Obispo, California), a lake in San Luis Obispo, California, United States

== See also ==
- Laguna (disambiguation)
- Lagoon (disambiguation)
- Lake (disambiguation)
