= St. Joseph River =

St. Joseph River may refer to:

- St. Joseph River (Lake Michigan) in southwest Michigan and northwest Indiana
- St. Joseph River (Maumee River tributary) in south-central Michigan, northwest Ohio and northeast Indiana
- Saint Joseph River (Dominica)
