= List of shipwrecks in May 1890 =

The list of shipwrecks in May 1890 includes ships sunk, foundered, grounded, or otherwise lost during May 1890.

== 1 May ==
List of shipwrecks: 1 May 1890
Ship	State	Description
Birchfield	United Kingdom	The steamship ran aground in the Elbe at Ottendorf, Germany. She was on a voyage from Rangoon, Burma to Hamburg, Germany. She was refloated on 3 May and taken in to Hamburg.
Good Design	United Kingdom	The packet boat was driven ashore on Whalsay, Shetland Islands. She floated off and sank.
Rosenborg	Denmark	The steamship ran aground at the Grundkallen Lighthouse, Sweden. She was refloated and taken in to Stockholm.
Sicilian	United Kingdom	The steamship was driven ashore at Ingonish, Nova Scotia, Dominion of Canada. She was on a voyage from Messina, Sicily, Italy to Montreal, Quebec, Dominion of Canada.

== 2 May ==
List of shipwrecks: 2 May 1890
Ship	State	Description
Elizabeth	Germany	The barque caught fire at Barry, Glamorgan, United Kingdom. The fire was extinguished.
Morven	United Kingdom	The steamship struck a rock and was beached at Sandy Point, Saint Kitts. She was a total loss. Morven was on a voyage from Basseterre, Saint Kitts to Stettin, Germany.
Mount Olivet	United Kingdom	The steamship collided with the steamship Saltwick (United Kingdom) and sank at Gibraltar. Her crew were rescued.
Yorkshire	United Kingdom	The steamship caught fire in the Irish Sea. She was on a voyage from Liverpool, Lancashire to Baltimore, Maryland, United States. She put back to Liverpool.

== 3 May ==
List of shipwrecks: 3 May 1890
Ship	State	Description
Minho	Portugal	The barque was driven ashore and wrecked at Maranhão, Brazil. She was on a voyage from Maranhão to Porto.

== 4 May ==
List of shipwrecks: 4 May 1890
Ship	State	Description
Crosshill	United Kingdom	The steamship ran aground at "Kallegrund". She was on a voyage from Bo'ness, Lothian to Norrköping, Sweden. She was refloated and taken in to Copenhagen, Denmark.
Emblyn	United Kingdom	The brigantine was wrecked on the Isla de Aves, Venezuela. Her crew survived.
Valparaíso	Chile	The ship ran into the steamship Adirondack (United States) at New York, United States and was severely damaged. Valparaíso was on a voyage from Caleta Buena to New York.

== 5 May ==
List of shipwrecks: 5 May 1890
Ship	State	Description
Bryon M.	United Kingdom	The schooner was driven ashore and wrecked at Montevideo, Uruguay.
George Dundas	United Kingdom	The schooner foundered 30 nautical miles (56 km) off Carlingford, County Louth. Her crew were rescued. She was on a voyage from Runcorn, Cheshire to Warrenpoint, County Down.
Jules Marie	France	The schooner was wrecked on the Baleines, off the Île de Ré, Seine-Inférieure. Her crew were rescued.
La Plata	Norway	The brig was run down and sunk by the steamship Chaucer (United Kingdom) at Montevideo. All on board were rescued.
Marianne Pepe	Italy	The brig was driven ashore at Montevideo.
Mary Thomas	United Kingdom	The steamship ran aground on the Monsciar Reef, in the Mediterranean Sea 6 nautical miles (11 km) east of Valetta, Malta. She was on a voyage from Sevastopol, Russia to Rotterdam, South Holland, Netherlands. She was refloated on 6 May.
Maurice	France	The schooner was driven ashore at Montevideo. She was refloated.
Move	Germany	The schooner ran aground at Montevideo. She was refloated and found to be leaky.
Osipee	United States	The schooner struck on the South-East Breaker at Isaac's Harbour, Nova Scotia, Dominion of Canada. Her crew were rescued.
Pearl	United Kingdom	The schooner was driven ashore on Terschelling, Friesland, Netherlands. She was refloated with assistance.
Richmond	United Kingdom	The steamship sank in the River Plate "near Oriental coast". She was refloated on 28 May.
Ville d'Honfleur	France	The steamship was run into by the steamship Lady Armstrong (United Kingdom) and sank at Havre de Grâce, Seine-Inférieure.
Wenonah	United Kingdom	The barque was driven ashore and wrecked at Montevideo.

== 6 May ==
List of shipwrecks: 6 May 1890
Ship	State	Description
Bokal	India	The flat sank in the River Dehing.
Bramhall	United States	The schooner was run into by the steamship Helvetia (United Kingdom) off New York and sank. Her crew were rescued.
Felbridge	United Kingdom	The steamship ran aground in the Paracel Islands. She was on a voyage from Saigon, French Indo-China to Hong Kong. She was refloated and taken in to Hong Kong in a leaky condition.
Marie	Denmark	The barque was wrecked on the coast of Madagascar. Her twelve crew took to the boats; they were subsequently rescued by the barque Aurora (Flag unknown). Marie was plundered by the local inhabitants. She was on a voyage from Mozambique to Adelaide, South Australia.
River Ettrick	United Kingdom	The steamship ran aground on the Nicholas Rock, off Ayr. She was on a voyage from Bilbao, Spain to Ayr.

== 7 May ==
List of shipwrecks: 7 May 1890
Ship	State	Description
Gertrude	United States	The yacht sank in the Ohio River at Wheeling, Virginia with the loss of twelve of the twenty people on board.
Ghafkos	Romania	The lighter collided with other lighters in the Danube and was beached.
Monmouth	United Kingdom	The steam barge ran aground and then collided with the dredger No.1 (United Kingdom) at Bristol, Gloucestershire. Monmouth was on a voyage from Newport, Monmouthshire to Bristol.
Vigilant	United Kingdom	The steamship ran aground at Wells-next-the-Sea, Norfolk. She was refloated with the assistance of the tug Marie (United Kingdom) and towed in to Wells-next-the-Sea.

== 9 May ==
List of shipwrecks: 9 May 1890
Ship	State	Description
Bergen	Flag unknown	The ship was driven ashore at Withernsea, Yorkshire, United Kingdom. She was on a voyage from Amsterdam, North Holland, Netherlands to Hull, Yorkshire.

== 10 May ==
List of shipwrecks: 10 May 1890
Ship	State	Description
Carmelite	United Kingdom	The fishing boat collided with a steamship and sank in the English Channel off Sandgate, Kent with the loss of all three crew.

== 11 May ==
List of shipwrecks: 11 May 1890
Ship	State	Description
Cleanthes	United Kingdom	The steamship was driven ashore and wrecked at Souter Point, County Durham. All 21 people on board survived. She was on a voyage from Vlissingen, Zeeland, Netherlands to the River Tyne.
Livadia	United Kingdom	The steamship was wrecked in the Gulf of Lyons. Her crew were rescued by the steamship Barcelona (Germany.

== 12 May ==
List of shipwrecks: 12 May 1890
Ship	State	Description
Manzanilla	United Kingdom	The ship was driven ashore in the Paraná River 40 nautical miles (74 km) upstream of Rosario, Brazil.
Norbvig Neptun	Flag unknown	The ship was abandoned in the Atlantic Ocean. Her crew were rescued by the barque Zorida (Norway). Norbvig Neptun was on a voyage from Valentia Island, County Kerry, United Kingdom to Miramichi, New Brunswick, Dominion of Canada.

== 13 May ==
List of shipwrecks: 13 May 1890
Ship	State	Description
Chevington	United Kingdom	The steamship ran aground in the River Thames near the "Stoneness Lighthouse" avoiding a collision with the steamship Henry Morton (United Kingdom). She was refloated and resumed her voyage.
Constance	United Kingdom	The schooner collided with the barque Dundale (United Kingdom) and sank in the English Channel off St. Catherine's Point, Isle of Wight. Her crew were rescued. Constance was on a voyage from London to Dublin.
Karl	Norway	The brig was driven ashore at Gravelines, Nord, France. She was a total loss.
Madrid	United Kingdom	The steamship ran aground at Cape Kara, Greece. She was later refloated with the assistance of a Regia Marina warship.
Nanny	Germany	The barque was wrecked at Santos, Brazil.
Osprey	United Kingdom	The smack collided with the steamship Henry Morton and sank in the River Thames with the loss of three of her four crew. The survivor was rescued by the steamship Chevington (United Kingdom). Osprey was on a voyage from Billingsgate, London to Burnham-on-Crouch, Essex.
Shildon	United Kingdom	The steamship ran aground in the Nieuwe Waterweg at Hellevoetsluis, South Holland, Netherlands. She was on a voyage from Vyborg, Russia to Dordrecht, South Holland.
Unnamed	United Kingdom	The dredger was holed and sank at Llanelly, Glamorgan.

== 14 May ==
List of shipwrecks: 14 May 1890
Ship	State	Description
Canopus	United Kingdom	The steamship ran aground on the Perce Rocks, in the Saint Lawrence River at Rivière-du-Loup, Quebec, Dominion of Canada. She was on a voyage from Liverpool, Lancashire to Montreal, Quebec.
City of Alexandria	United States	The steamship ran aground on the Florida Reefs. She was on a voyage from New York to Galveston, Texas and Havana, Cuba. She was refloated and taken in to Havana, where she arrived on 28 May.
Norseman	United States	The schooner was wrecked at All Right Island, Magdalen Islands, Dominion of Canada. Her crew were rescued.

== 15 May ==
List of shipwrecks: 15 May 1890
Ship	State	Description
Caledonia	United Kingdom	The steamship ran aground in the Dardanelles at "Ingebournon", Ottoman Empire. She was on a voyage from Odessa, Russia to London. She was later refloated and taken in to Gallipoli, Ottoman Empire.
Fredensborg	Denmark	The steamship ran aground in the River Thames at the Coalhouse Fort, Essex, United Kingdom. She was on a voyage from London to Sunderland, County Durham, United Kingdom. She was refloated and resumed her voyage.
Hattie S. Clark	United States	The schooner capsized is a squall off the Frying Pan Shoals. One crewman was saved that day, another the next day. The other seven crew were lost.
Pacific	United States	The ferryboat was run into by the steamship State of Georgia (United Kingdom) at New York, United States and was severely damaged.

== 16 May ==
List of shipwrecks: 16 May 1890
Ship	State	Description
Alwick	United Kingdom	The schooner was driven ashore on the Pennington Spit, Hampshire. She was on a voyage from London to Dublin.
Chongar	United Kingdom	The steamship arrived at Constantinople, Ottoman Empire in a sinking condition and was beached. She was on a voyage from Odessa, Russia to Constantinople.
Dacca	United Kingdom	The steamship ran aground on the Daedalus Reef, in the Red Sea and sank. All on board, more than 400 people, were rescued by the steamships Rosario and Palamcotta (both United Kingdom). Dacca was on a voyage from London to ports in Queensland
Eel	United Kingdom	The barge was run into by the steamship Blencowe (United Kingdom) and sunk in the River Thames at Wapping, London.
Martin Luther	United Kingdom	The sloop collided with the steamship Laverock (United Kingdom) in the River Thames at Deptford, London and became severely leaky.
Richard Moxon	United Kingdom	The steamship collided with the steamship Voorwaarts (Netherlands) and sank in the River Ouse at Swinefleet, Yorkshire. Richard Moxon was on a voyage from Goole, Yorkshire to Ghent, East Flanders, Belgium.
Thor	Denmark	The barque collided with the steamship Thomas Wilson (United Kingdom) and sank off Karlskrona, Sweden. Her crew were rescued. Thor was on a voyage from Pori, Grand Duchy of Finland to an English port.
Unnamed	United Kingdom	The barge was run into by the steamship Helge (Denmark) and sank in the River Thames at Blackwall, London. The sole crew member was rescued.

== 17 May ==
List of shipwrecks: 17 May 1890
Ship	State	Description
Harold	United Kingdom	The steamship ran aground on the Butter Pladdy, in Cloughey Bay. She was on a voyage from Bilbao, Spain to Ayr. She was refloatedk, but consequently foundered off the South Rock Lighthouse, County Down with the loss of six of her seventeen crew. Survivors were rescued by the steamshipTelegraphic (United Kingdom).

== 18 May ==
List of shipwrecks: 18 May 1890
Ship	State	Description
Breck	Flag unknown	The schooner capsized off Nine Mile Point, New York, United States with the loss of all eight crew.
Diana	Norway	The barque was wrecked near Martín García Island, Argentina. She was on a voyage from Brunswick to Rosario, Argentina.
Dunkerque	France	The barque ran aground at Dunkerque, Nord. She was refloated on 20 May and taken in to Dunkerque.

== 19 May ==
List of shipwrecks: 19 May 1890
Ship	State	Description
Belle A. Nauss	United States	The schooner was wrecked near Wellfleet, Massachusetts. Her crew were rescued.
Stanley	United Kingdom	The steamship was driven ashore at Sangatte, Pas-de-Calais, France. She was on a voyage from Sundsvall, Sweden to Boulogne, Pas-de-Calais. She was refloated and completed her voyage.
Unnamed	Flag unknown	The ship was driven ashore at Point Palmyras, India.

== 20 May ==
List of shipwrecks: 20 May 1890
Ship	State	Description
Anna	Norway	The barque ran aground on the Black Tail, off the coast of Essex, United Kingdom. She was refloated on 1 June and towed in to Southend, Essex.
Lady Eglantine	United Kingdom	The steamship was driven ashore at Cardiff, Glamorgan.
Olive Leaf	Belgium	The fishing lugger capsized off Shoreham-by-Sea, Sussex, United Kingdom with the loss of all three crew.
Unnamed	United Kingdom	The fishing boat capsized off Ram's Head, Devon with the loss of all four crew.
Unnamed	United Kingdom	The fishing boat capsized off Portland, Dorset with the loss of both crew.
Unnamed	United Kingdom	The fishing boat foundered off Salcombe, Devon. Her crew were rescued by the Salcombe Lifeboat Lesty ( Royal National Lifeboat Institution).

== 21 May ==
List of shipwrecks: 21 May 1890
Ship	State	Description
E. Sutton	United Kingdom	The barque was wrecked on a reef off Punta Holandes, Cuba. Her eleven crew survived. She was on a voyage from Manzanilla, Trinidad to Boston, Massachusetts, United States.
Mountain Girl	United States	The steamship sank in the Gulf of Mexico while under tow to Central America. Two crewmen died.
Seven unnamed vessels	Flags unknown	The ships were wrecked on the coast of Cuba with much loss of life.

== 22 May ==
List of shipwrecks: 22 May 1890
Ship	State	Description
Alarm	United Kingdom	The ship foundered in the Bristol Channel off Weston-super-Mare, Somerset with the loss of a crew member.
Carrier Dove	United Kingdom	The barque was damaged by ice and abandoned by her crew, who were rescued by the steamship Charrington (United Kingdom). Carrier Dove was on a voyage from Saint John, New Brunswick, Dominion of Canada to Glasgow, Renfrewshire. She was still afloat on 27 June.
Duke of Sutherland	United Kingdom	The steamship was driven ashore at Reuben Point, Madagascar. She was on a voyage from London to ports in New Zealand. She was refloated on 1 June.
George E. Corbett	United Kingdom	The barque was abandoned in the Atlantic Ocean. Her crew were rescued by the steamship Denmark (United Kingdom). George E. Corbett was on a voyage from Saint John, New Brunswick to Dundalk, County Louth.
L'Avenire	Flag unknown	The ship was driven ashore at Port Pirie, South Australia.
Nicolaus	Sweden	The schooner ran aground on Arpo. She was on a voyage from Hartlepool, County Durham, United Kingdom to Karlshamn.
Pearl	United Kingdom	The schooner was run into by the steamship Evelyn (United Kingdom) and sank in the English Channel off The Lizard, Cornwall. Her crew were rescued by Evelyn.
Primrose	United Kingdom	The steamship ran aground on the Blennick Perch. She was refloated and resumed her voyage.
Unnamed	United Kingdom	The Galway hooker was run into by a barque and sank in the River Shannon with the loss of three lives.

== 23 May ==
List of shipwrecks: 23 May 1890
Ship	State	Description
Diamant	Germany	The full-rigged ship ran aground on the Sow and Pigs Rocks, in the North Sea off the coast of Northumberland, United Kingdom. She was on a voyage from Hamburg to Blyth, Northumberland. She was refloated with the assistance of two tugs and towed in to Blyth.
Lord Derby	United Kingdom	The steamship was damaged by an onboard explosion at Gibraltar.
Lotus	United States	The yacht capsized, or swamped, and sank attempting to enter the mouth of the Merrimack River. Two crewmen drowned.
Merlin	United Kingdom	The steamship ran aground in the River Tyne at Newcastle upon Tyne, Northumberland.
Norge	Norway	The barque was wrecked on the south coast of Cuba. She was on a voyage from Buenos Aires, Argentina to Ship Island, Mississippi, United States.
Prinz Regent	Germany	The barque ran aground at Swinemünde. She was on a voyage from "Herwig" to Swinemünde.
Saron	Norway	The barque ran aground on the Ortiz Bank, in the River Plate. She was on a voyage from Buenos Aires, Argentina to a port in the English Channel.
Unnamed	France	The lighter sank in the Gironde.

== 24 May ==
List of shipwrecks: 24 May 1890
Ship	State	Description
Buccleuch	United Kingdom	The steam fishing vessel was driven ashore at Dunbar, Lothian.
Empress	Norway	The brig ran aground in the Drogden. She was reported to be on a voyage from Blyth, Northumberland to Sunderland, County Durham, United Kingdom. She was refloated with assistance and taken in to Copenhagen, Denmark.
Humber	United Kingdom	The schooner was run into by the steamship Ballochbuie (United Kingdom) and sank in the North Sea 4 nautical miles (7.4 km) north east of Blyth, Northumberland. Her crew were rescued by Ballochbuie. Humber was on a voyage from Sunderland to Invergordon, Ross-shire.
Isabella	United Kingdom	The schooner was driven ashore at Newhaven, Sussex.
Santa Cecilia	United Kingdom	The steam yacht ran aground at Moel-y-Don, Anglesey. She was refloated and taken in to Holyhead, Anglesey in a leaky condition.

== 25 May ==
List of shipwrecks: 25 May 1890
Ship	State	Description
Albano	United Kingdom	The steamship collided with the steamship Nerissa (United Kingdom) and sank 3 nautical miles (5.6 km) south west of the Longships Lighthouse, Cornwall. Her 26 crew were rescued by the tug Britannia (United Kingdom). Albano was on a voyage from Baltimore, Maryland, United States to Rotterdam, South Holland, Netherlands.
Ashleigh Brook	United Kingdom	The steamship was wrecked on Dassen Island, Cape Colony. Her crew were rescued. She was on a voyage from Barry Island, Glamorgan to Rockhampton, Queensland.
Augustine Kobbe	United States	The barque ran aground off Cape Rees, Victoria. She was on a voyage from Fremantle, Western Australia to Sharks Bay.
Ianthe	United Kingdom	The steamship ran aground off Hove, Sussex. She was on a voyage from Hartlepool, County Durham to Shoreham-by-Sea, Sussex. She was refloated.
Le Petterin	France	The schooner was driven ashore on Svalverort, Russia.
Marques	Spain	The steamship was driven ashore at St. Agnes, Isles of Scilly, United Kingdom. She was on a voyage from Bilbao to Newport, Monmouthshire, United Kingdom. She was refloated.
Swallow	United Kingdom	The steamship foundered in the North Sea 15 or 52 nautical miles (28 or 96 km) off the Longstone Lighthouse, Northumberland. Her eleven crew survived.
Thora	Sweden	The schooner was driven ashore at Kalmar. She was on a voyage from Rønne, Denmark to Rörstrand.
Yeada	United States	The steam yacht was run down and sunk by Aurania (United Kingdom) at New York and sank with the loss of the six people on board.
394	Russia	The lighter sank at Peterhoff.
Unnamed	United States	The steam launch capsized in Ipswich Bay. Two crewmen drowned.

== 26 May ==
List of shipwrecks: 26 May 1890
Ship	State	Description
Harry	United Kingdom	The Thames barge sprang a leak and sank in the River Thames near Tilbury, Essex. She was later refloated.
Iduna	Norway	The barque was driven ashore at Grisslehamn, Sweden. She was on a voyage from Porsgrund to Hudiksvall, Sweden.
Nidaros	Denmark	The steamship collided with the steamship Polynesia (Germany) in the Oder and was severely damaged.
Richard and Frances	United Kingdom	The ship foundered off the Dudgeon Bank, in the North Sea off the coast of Norfolk. Her crew were rescued by the steamship Gardenia (United Kingdom). Richard and Frances was on a voyage from London to Hull, Yorkshire.

== 27 May ==
List of shipwrecks: 27 May 1890
Ship	State	Description
Hertha	Sweden	The brigantine was driven ashore on Arholma. She was on a voyage from Stockholm to Kristianstad.
Ottokar	Germany	The steamship was damaged by fire at Dunkerque, Nord, France.
Thule	Sweden	The steamship was driven ashore at Kråksund, Norway.
Unnamed	Spain	The lighter sank at A Coruña.

== 28 May ==
List of shipwrecks: 28 May 1890
Ship	State	Description
Beshiktash	Ottoman Empire	The steamship was run into by the steamship Tidjaret Cahrie (Ottoman Empire) and sank at Pera with the loss of three lives.
Glenlassa	United Kingdom	The schooner was driven ashore at Fleetwood, Lancashire. She was on a voyage from the Clyde to Glasson Dock, Lancashire.
La Portena	Chile	The hulk sprang a leak and sank at Valparaíso.
Naomi	(United Kingdom of Great Britain and Ireland) Colony of Newfoundland	The sealing schooner was lost near Cape John.

== 29 May ==
List of shipwrecks: 29 May 1890
Ship	State	Description
Berta	Romania	The lighter ran aground in the Danube downstream of Galați.
Hugo Georg	Germany	The ship ran aground off Dunkerque, Nord, France. She was refloated and put back to Dunkerque in a leaky condition.
Paoching	China	The steamship was destroyed by fire in the Yangtze. Twenty-two people were reported missing. She was on a voyage from Shanghai to Hankow or vice versa
Suez	United Kingdom	The steamship ran aground on the Maleatoll Reef, in the Maldive Islands. She was on a voyage from Pondicherry, India to Marseille, Bouches-du-Rhône, France. She was refloated and put in to Bombay, India on 6 June in a leaky condition.

== 30 May ==
List of shipwrecks: 30 May 1890
Ship	State	Description
Ida	Norway	The barque was abandoned in the Atlantic Ocean. Her crew were rescued by the barque Dalhanna (United Kingdom).
Virgo	United Kingdom	The steamship was damaged by fire at Granton, Lothian.

== 31 May ==
List of shipwrecks: 31 May 1890
Ship	State	Description
Dinapore	United Kingdom	The ship was wrecked at Cape Corrientes with the loss of six of her crew. She was on a voyage from Middlesbrough, Yorkshire to Bahía Blanca, Brazil.
Dunbritton	United Kingdom	The steamship ran aground at Huelva, Spain. She was refloated and taken in to Huelva.
Prins Oscar	Sweden	The steamship ran ashore in the River Thames at Blackwall, London, United Kingdom. She was on a voyage from London to Sunderland, County Durham, United Kingdom. She was refloated with the assistance of a number of tugs and resumed her voyage.
Saladin	United Kingdom	The steamship was damaged by fire at Liverpool, Lancashire.

== Unknown date ==
List of shipwrecks: Unknown date in May 1890
Ship	State	Description
Agenor	United States	The ship ran aground in the Gedney Channel. She was on a voyage from New York to San Diego, California.
Agnes Lilian	United Kingdom	The ship ran aground on the English Bank, in the River Plate and was abandoned by her crew. She was on a voyage from South Shields, County Durham to Antofagasta, Chile. She was refloated with assistance and found to be severely leaky.
Ann Bruce	United Kingdom	The boat struck a rock and sank in Vatersay Sound. Her crew were rescued.
Arocuna	United States	The steamship was driven ashore at "Zabacoa". She was on a voyage from Puerto Rica to Philadelphia, Pennsylvania. She was refloated and completed her voyage.
Caledonia	United Kingdom	The ship was driven ashore at Pera, Ottoman Empire. She was later refloated and taken in to Gallipoli.
Cape Breton	United Kingdom	The steamship ran aground at Ingonish, Nova Scotia, Dominion of Canada. She was on a voyage from Messina, Sicily, Italy to Montreal. She was refloated and resumed her voyage.
David Taylor	United Kingdom	The barque was driven ashore near Lockport, Newfoundland Colony. She was on a voyage from Londonderryto Saint John, New Brunswick, Dominion of Canada.
Domeniack	Italy	The barque was drien ashore in the Chandeleur Islands, Louisiana, United States. She was on a voyage from Pensacola, Florida, United States to Genoa.
Eastward	United Kingdom	The schooner was driven ashore at Bahía Blanca, Brazil.
Ehen	France	The barque was wrecked at Portland Bill, Dorset, United Kingdom.
Gerhardine	Germany	The steamship was driven ashore at Nexø, Denmark. She was on a voyage from Leer to Riga, Russia. She was refloated and taken in to Rønne, Denmark.
Hartburn	United Kingdom	The steamship ran aground at "Bulosorse". She was refloated on 4 May and resumed her voyage.
Iona	United Kingdom	The steamship ran aground in the Suez Canal at EL Ferdane, Egypt.
Jacoff Proseroff	Germany	The steamship was driven ashore at Danzig. She was later refloated with the assistance of Ruegen and Oresund (Flags unknown) and found to be leaky.
Lady of the Lake	United Kingdom	The ship was driven ashore on Block Island. Her crew were rescued. Lady of the Lake was on a voyage from New York to Windsor, Ontario, Dominion of Canada. She was a total loss.
Larana	Norway	The barque foundered in the Atlantic Ocean. Her crew were rescued by the steamship Hawarden (United Kingdom).
Louis	Norway	The barque was abandoned at sea. Her crew were rescued. She was on a voyage from Ostend, West Flanders, Belgium to Sydney, New South Wales.
Mabel Purdy	United Kingdom	The schooner collided with the barque Paramatta (United Kingdom) and was severely damaged. She put in to Saint John, New Brunswick, Dominion of Canada.
Martha	Norway	The ship was driven ashore and wrecked at Codroy, Newfoundland Colony. Her crew were rescued. She was on a voyage from Buenos Aires, Argentina to Quebec, Dominion of Canada.
Natalie	United Kingdom	The brigantine was wrecked. She was on a voyage from New York to the Rio Grande.
Neptune	United Kingdom	The brig was abandoned in the Atlantic Ocean. Her crew were rescued by the barque Zorida (Norway).
Noumea	France	The steamship sprang a leak and was beached in Sandy Bay, Loyalty Islands. All on board were rescued by the steamship Tenterden (United Kingdom). Noumea was on a voyage from New Caledonia to the New Hebrides.
Ohio	United States	The steamship collided with the steamship Siberia (United States) and sank in the Saint Marie River.
Osprey	United Kingdom	The smack sank in the North Sea off the coast of Essex.
Panitola	India	The flat was driven ashore and wrecked at Calcutta. She was a total loss.
Rapide	Russia	The barque was driven ahsore at Bahía Blanca. Her crew were rescued. She was on a voyage from Grimsby, Lincolnshire, United Kingdom to Bahía Blanca.
Sea King, and Victorine	United States; France	The full-rigged ship Sea King and the barque Victorine collided at Iquique, Peru. Both vessels were severely damaged.
Thor	Denmark	The barque collided with another vessel and was abandoned by her crew. She was taken in to Karlskrona, Sweden by the gunboat HSwMS Skagul (Swedish Navy).
Victoria	Germany	The barque ran aground on the Lappegrunden, in the Baltic Sea. She was on a voyage from New York to Königsberg. She was refloated with assistance and towed in to Helsingør, Denmark.
Wilhelm Joseph	Germany	The schooner collided with another vessel and was severely damaged. She was towed in to Copenhagen, Denmark.
