= Savane =

Savane may refer to:

- Savane (album), Ali Farka Touré album
- Savane (sportswear), sportswear collection owned by Perry Ellis International
- Savané, surname
- Savane church, an 11th-century Georgian Orthodox church in the eponymous village in the western Georgian region of Imereti
- Savane River (disambiguation)
