= Salée River =

Salée River may refer to:

- Salée River (Dominica)
- Salée River (New Caledonia), a river of New Caledonia
