= Matthieu River =

River in Dominica

The Matthieu River is a river on the Caribbean island of Dominica. The river flows into the Layou River.

== See also ==
- List of rivers of Dominica
