= Picard, Dominica =

Coordinates: 15.5537°N 61.4609°W

Picard is a community on the northwest side of Dominica. It is part of Portsmouth, Dominica.

The Ross University School of Medicine, part of DeVry University, was located in Picard and once had over a thousand medical students arriving annually from the United States and Canada who studied there, but the campus was permanently relocated to Barbados at the beginning of the 2019 Spring semester due to extensive hurricane damage suffered at the Dominican campus. The school's presence was a major economic resource for the local people. There was a Subway restaurant on the school's campus, one of three on the island.

The Picard River is a river in Dominica. It rises on the northern slopes of Morne Diablotins, flowing northwest to reach the Caribbean Sea at Prince Rupert Bay on the country's northwestern coast, close to the town of Portsmouth.
