= Circle of Love =

Circle of Love may refer to:

== Music ==
- Circle of Love (Steve Miller Band album), 1981, and the title track
- Circle of Love (Sister Sledge album), 1975, and the title track
- "Circle of Love" (song), a song written by Dolly Parton, from the 2016 album by Jennifer Nettles To Celebrate Christmas

== Film ==
- Circle of Love (film), a 1964 French film

== See also ==
- Dolly Parton's Christmas of Many Colors: Circle of Love, a 2016 TV film
- La Ronde (disambiguation)
