= Salee =

Salee may refer to:

- Salé, a city in northwestern Morocco
- Salée River (Dominica)
- Salée River (New Caledonia), a river of New Caledonia
