= River Claire =

River Claire may refer to:

- River Claire (Dominica)
- River Claire (Grenada)
