= Savane River =

Savane River may refer to:

== Canada ==
- Savane River (Caldwell River tributary), a tributary of the Caldwell River in Bas-Saint-Laurent, Quebec
- Little Savane River (Temiscouata Lake), a tributary of Lake Témiscouata in Bas-Saint-Laurent, Quebec (see List of rivers of Quebec#Saint John River – watershed of Madawaska River – Quebec and New Brunswick)
- Petite rivière des Savanes (Sainte-Marguerite River tributary), a tributary of the Sainte-Marguerite River in Côte-Nord, Quebec (see List of rivers of Quebec#Watershed of Saguenay River)
- Savane River (Grand Calder River tributary), a tributary of the Grand Calder River, in Chaudière-Appalaches, Quebec (see List of rivers of Quebec#Saint John River watershed – higher part (Quebec, Maine and New Brunswick))
- Savane River (Péribonka River tributary), a tributary of the Péribonka River, in Saguenay–Lac-Saint-Jean, Quebec
- Savane River (Rivière des Neiges tributary), a tributary of the Rivière des Neiges in Capitale-Nationale, Quebec
- Savane River (Vermillon River tributary), a tributary of the Vermillon River in Mauricie, Quebec (see List of rivers of Quebec#Watershed of Saint-MauriceRiver)
- Savanes River, a tributary of the Escoumins River in Côte-Nord, Quebec (see List of rivers of Quebec#North-shore tributaries downstream of Tadoussac
- Rivière Savane du Nord, a tributary of the Sainte-Anne River in Lac-Pikauba, Quebec
- Rivière-de-la-Savane, Quebec, an unorganized territory in Mauricie, Quebec
- Rivière de la Savane (île d'Orléans), a tributary of chenal des Grands Voiliers, in Saint-François-de-l'Île-d'Orléans, L'Île-d'Orléans Regional County Municipality, Capitale-Nationale, Quebec, Canada

== Dominica ==
- Savane River (Dominica)

== See also ==
- Savane (disambiguation)
