= Bell Hall River =

River in Dominica

Coordinates: 15°36′N 61°28′W

The Bell Hall River is a river on the Caribbean island of Dominica. It is located in Saint John Parish.

== Geography ==
The Bell Hall River originates in the area of Trocard south of the Morne aux Diables (Devil’s Peak), very close to the sources of the North River. It flows southwest, through the Burnet area and south of Bell Hall Estate, and from there so far west that it flows into Douglas Bay north of Cabrits National Park.

On the way, it picks up some smaller nameless streams from the left and south. To the north, the catchment area of the Salt River adjoins, which runs parallel at times.

== See also ==
- List of rivers of Dominica
