= Cottage (Dominica constituency) =

Electoral district in Dominica

- Constituency for the House of Assembly of Dominica
- Electorate: 2,186 (2016)

Current constituency
- Created: 1975
- Number of members: 1
- Representative: Roland Royer (DLP)

Cottage is a parliamentary electoral district in Dominica. It includes the areas of Capuchin, Clifton, Cottage and Lagoon and came into effect in time for the 1975 Dominican general election. It has been represented by Roland Royer of the Dominica Labour Party since the 2022 general election.

== Constituency profile ==
The constituency was established prior to the 1975 Dominican general election. There was an electorate of 2,186 as of November 2016. It includes the areas of Capuchin, Clifton, Cottage and Lagoon. The boundary extends from the sea along the border between Saint John Parish and Saint Andrew Parish to Marne Brules and then to the north river east of Grange and along the river to the sea.

== Representatives ==
This constituency has elected the following members of the House of Assembly of Dominica:

Election	Years	Member	Party	Notes
1975	24 March 1975 – 21 July 1980	Culand Dubois	DLP	
1980	21 July 1980 – 12 June 1995	Alleyne Carbon	DFP	
1995	12 June 1995 – 2022	Reginald Austrie	DLP	
2022	2022 – Present	Roland Royer	DLP	

== Election results ==
=== Elections in the 2010s ===
2019 general election: Cottage
Party	Candidate	Votes	%	±%
DLP	Reginald Austrie	948	73.83	
UWP	Marcus Romain	336	26.17	
Majority		612	47.66	
Turnout		1,284		
DLP hold		Swing		

2014 general election: Cottage
Party	Candidate	Votes	%	±%
DLP	Reginald Austrie	1,029	82.92	
UWP	Stewart Burton	193	15.55	
Independent	Jerome Lavershire	19	1.53	
Majority		836	67.37	
Turnout		1,241	54.22	
DLP hold		Swing		
