= Colihaut River =

River in Dominica

Coordinates: 15°29′N 61°29′W

The Colihaut River is a river in Dominica.

== See also ==
- List of rivers of Dominica
