= Arthur Randall =

Arthur Clunie Randall
- Born: 6 February 1896; Paisley, Renfrew, Scotland
- Died: unknown unknown
- Military career
- Allegiance: United Kingdom
- Branch: British Army; Royal Air Force
- Service years: 1914–1926
- Rank: Flight Lieutenant
- Nickname: "Snowy"
- Units: Border Regiment; No. 32 Squadron RFC; No. 85 Squadron RAF; No. 210 Squadron RAF; No. 203 Squadron RAF
- Conflicts: World War I • Western Front • British campaign in the Baltic (1918–19)
- Awards: Distinguished Flying Cross; Cross of Liberty (Estonia)

Flight Lieutenant Arthur Clunie Randall DFC (b. 6 February 1896) was a Scottish World War I flying ace credited with 10 aerial victories. After earning a Distinguished Flying Cross during the war, he remained in military service until 1926.

== Early life ==
Arthur Clunie Randall was born in Paisley, Scotland, on 6 February 1896. When he enlisted in the military, he was living in Bothwell, Lanarkshire.

== World War I ==
On 13 November 1914, Randall was among cadets and ex-cadets of the Officers' Training Corps appointed as temporary second lieutenants in the infantry. After serving in a reserve battalion of the Border Regiment, he was attached to the Royal Flying Corps on 27 October 1916, and appointed a flying officer, transferred to the General List, on 30 November. He was posted to No. 32 Squadron, flying an Airco DH.2. He scored his first aerial victory with them on 23 January 1917. He would score one more win with them, being wounded in the process, on 11 March 1917. On 1 April 1917 he was promoted to lieutenant, and on 3 June was appointed a flight commander with the temporary rank of captain. His second combat tour was as a fighter pilot with No. 85 Squadron, flying a Royal Aircraft Factory SE.5a. This time around, he scored another eight aerial victories, between June and October 1918, culminating in the award of the Distinguished Flying Cross just days before the Armistice. His citation read:

Captain Arthur Clunie Randall.

"A daring and skilful airman who during recent operations has accounted for six enemy aeroplanes. He is conspicuous for his determination and devotion to duty."

=== List of aerial victories ===
Combat record
No.	Date/time	Aircraft/ Serial No.	Opponent	Result	Location	Notes
1	23 January 1917 @1515	Airco DH.2	German reconnaissance aircraft	Destroyed by fire	Ervillers, France	Shared with Captain Leslie Peech Aizlewood, Lieutenants G. J. King, Frank Billinge & T. A. Gooch, and 2nd Lieutenant Arthur Coningham
2	11 March 1917 @1005	Airco DH.2; Serial number A2548	Albatros D.III	Driven down out of control	Bapaume, France	
3	18 June 1918 @0450	SE.5a s/n B7870	German reconnaissance aircraft	Destroyed	Voormezeele, Belgium	Shared with Lieutenant Alec Reid
4	14 July 1918 @0835	SE.5a s/n C1928	Pfalz D.III	Destroyed	North of Merville, France	
5	24 July 1918 @1045	SE.5a s/n C1931	Fokker D.VII	Destroyed	Neuve-Église, France	
6	31 July 1918 @2005	SE.5a s/n C6454	Albatros reconnaissance aircraft	Destroyed	Vieille-Chapelle, France	
7	9 August 1918 @0755	SE.5a s/n C6454	Albatros reconnaissance aircraft	Destroyed by fire	Steenwerck, France	
8	10 August 1918 @0640	SE.5a s/n C6454	DFW reconnaissance aircraft	Destroyed	Le Touret, France	
9	22 August 1918 @1650	SE.5a s/n C6454	Fokker D.VII	Driven down out of control	Maricourt, France	
10	4 October 1918 @1755	SE.5a s/n E5487	DFW reconnaissance aircraft	Destroyed	Northwest of Aubencheul-aux-Bois, France	

== Post-war career ==
Randall remained in the RAF after the war, being granted a permanent commission with the rank of captain on 1 August 1919. He was then serving in the campaign in the Baltic in which British forces supported the White Army against the Reds in the Russian Civil War. Randall took part in the Raid on Kronstadt on the night of 17/18 August 1919. He flew one of the eight aircraft that created a diversion while Royal Navy Coastal Motor Boats attacked Russian warships. However, Randall suffered an engine failure en route. He was just about to land when his engine came back to life, and despite knowing that it could fail again at any time, he pressed on to take part in the attack. His engine failed completely on the return journey. Meanwhile, a flotilla of eight Coastal Motor Boats entered the harbour and launched their torpedoes, succeeding in sinking the submarine tender Dvina (formerly the armoured cruiser Pamiat Azova), and damaging the battleships Petropavlovsk and Andrei Pervozvanny, though three CMB's were sunk. On 26 March 1920, Randall was awarded the Cross of Liberty Second Class by the government of Estonia, in recognition of his services during the Estonian War of Independence.

Randall then served in No. 210 Squadron, based at RAF Gosport, until 30 January 1922 when he was transferred to No. 203 Squadron, based at RAF Leuchars. However he was soon transferred again, moving to the RAF Depot (Inland Area) as a supernumerary on 3 April. From 6 January 1923 he served as adjutant of the Inland Area Aircraft Depot.

Randall was dismissed from the Royal Air Force by sentence of a General Court-Martial on 23 December 1926. He reportedly emigrated to Dominica, in the Caribbean, settled in the village of Delices, and was still living there up until 1948.

== See also ==
- List of World War I aces credited with 10 victories
- Aerial victory standards of World War I
