= Cassandra Williams =

Dominica politician

Member of the House of Assembly of Dominica
- Incumbent
- Assumed office 2022
- Constituency: La Plaine constituency

Personal details
- Party: Dominica Labour Party

Cassandra Williams is a Dominican politician from the Dominica Labour Party who was elected MP for La Plaine constituency in the 2022 general election. Following her election she was appointed Minister of State responsible for Seniors Security by Prime Minister Roosevelt Skerrit.
