= Ronde =

Ronde may refer to:

- Rønde, a town in Denmark
- Majin Tensei: Ronde, a Japanese Sega Saturn game
- Ronde (script)
- Ronde Barber, American sports broadcaster and former football player
- Rondé, a Dutch indie pop band
- Wedang ronde, an Indonesian dessert

== See also ==
- Rondae Hollis-Jefferson (born 1995), American basketball player
- La Ronde (disambiguation)
