= Lagoon (disambiguation) =

A lagoon is a shallow body of water separated from a larger body of water by reefs, barrier islands, or a barrier peninsula.

Lagoon may also refer to:

== Arts and entertainment ==
- "Lagoon", a song by Nightwish from the 2007 reissue of the album Century Child
- Lagoon (novel), by Nnedi Okorafor, 2014
- Lagoon (video game), 1990
- "The Lagoon", an 1897 short story by Joseph Conrad

== Other uses ==
- Lagoon (amusement park), in Farmington, Utah, U.S.
- Lagoon catamaran, a brand of twin-hulled boat
- Lagoon Nebula, an interstellar cloud
- Lagoon River, in Dominica
- Lagoon, maker of the Choo Choo Bar confectionery
- Waste stabilization lagoon, a waste stabilization pond

== See also ==
- Estuary
