= Salisbury River =

River in Dominica

Coordinates: 15°26′N 61°27′W

The Salisbury River is a river on the Caribbean island of Dominica.

== See also ==
- List of rivers of Dominica
