= Lagon River =

River in Dominica

Coordinates: 15°35′N 61°28′W

The Lagon River is a river which is located on the Caribbean island of Dominica.

== See also ==
- List of rivers of Dominica
