= La Ronde =

La Ronde or Laronde may refer to:

== Geography ==
- La Ronde, Charente-Maritime, a commune in the Charente-Maritime département, France
- La Ronde River, on the Caribbean island of Dominica
- La Ronde (amusement park), Montreal, Quebec, Canada
- A La Ronde, an 18th-century, 16-sided house located in Exmouth, Devon, England

== People ==
- Everald La Ronde (born 1963), English former footballer
- André Laronde (1940–2011), French archaeologist
- Giselle Laronde (born 1963), Trinidadian model

== Theatre, film and TV ==
- La Ronde (play), Arthur Schnitzler's 1897 play also known as Reigen
- La Ronde (1950 film), directed by Max Ophūls, based on the play
- La Ronde (1964 film) or Circle of Love, directed by Roger Vadim, based on the play
- La Ronde (2011 film), a Canadian short film directed by Sophie Goyette

== Other uses ==
- La Ronde (restaurant), first revolving restaurant in the United States
- La Ronde, a Haitian literary society founded by Georges Sylvain
- "La Ronde", song by André Caplet

== See also ==
- Round dance
- Ronde (disambiguation)
