= Benjamin's Park =

Sporting venue in Dominica

- Portsmouth (Lesser Antilles)
- Interactive map of Benjamin's Park

Ground information
- Location: Portsmouth, Saint John Parish
- Country: Dominica
- Coordinates: 15°34′29″N 61°27′16″W
- Establishment: unknown

Team information
Windward Islands	(2007)
- As of 20 May 2015; Source: CricketArchive

Benjamin's Park is a sporting venue in Portsmouth, Dominica, located 30 miles (48 km) away from the capital, Roseau. The venue's primary use is as a cricket ground, and it has held home matches for the Windward Islands, as well as several matches in regional tournaments.

== History ==
What is now Benjamin's Park was originally designed as Portsmouth's main public square, according to the 1765 town plan laid out by a Royal Engineer. During the 1980s, the park was the proposed site for a "multi-purpose community complex", financed entirely by the People's Republic of China. However, the Dominican government never agreed to the project. In January 2007, the ground hosted two home fixtures for the Windward Islands against Barbados, a four-day Carib Beer Cup match followed by a one-day KFC Cup match. The four-day game was the first first-class match played in Dominica since 2004, with Benjamin's Park becoming the third ground in Dominica to host first-class cricket (after Windsor Park and the Botanical Gardens, both in Roseau). Both matches were interrupted by rain, with the one-day fixture ending in a no result, but the second day of the four-day match, a Sunday, saw an attendance of around 4,000. Benjamin's Park had been upgraded to West Indies Cricket Board (WICB) standard with money from the Stanford 20/20 tournament, and was used while Windsor Park was being upgraded for the 2007 World Cup.

In 2008, Benjamin's Park hosted a Windward Islands Tournament fixture for the first time, when Saint Lucia played Saint Vincent and the Grenadines. It was again used for the competition during the 2012–13 season, but is yet to see any home games for the Dominican national side. When Bangladesh toured the West Indies in 2009, Benjamin's Park was used for a limited-overs game between the Bangladeshis and a University of the West Indies Vice-Chancellor's XI, although the match did not have list-A status. In August 2014, the ground was used for a number of the matches in the WICB Regional Women's Championship, which was hosted by Dominica as a whole. Later in the year, in December, a new government-sponsored training facility, the Dominica Cricket Academy, was opened at the ground.

== Records ==
=== First-class ===
- Highest team total: 183/9 dec. by Barbados v Windward Islands, 2006/07
- Lowest team total: 91 all out by Windward Islands v Barbados, 2006/07
- Highest individual innings: 44 by Dale Richards for Barbados v Windward Islands, 2006/07
- Best bowling in an innings: 6/24 by Pedro Collins for Barbados v Windward Islands, 2006/07

=== List A ===
- Highest team total: 82/3 by Barbados v Windward Islands, 2006/07
- Lowest team total: 82/3 by Barbados v Windward Islands, 2006/07
- Highest individual innings: 27 by Wayne Blackman for Barbados v Windward Islands, 2006/07
- Best bowling in an innings: 2/33 by Deighton Butler for Windward Islands v Barbados, 2006/07

== See also ==
- List of cricket grounds in the West Indies
