= Aouya River =

River in Dominica

Location
- Country: Dominica
- Parish: Saint Andrew Parish

Physical characteristics
- Mouth
  - coordinates: 15°37′17″N 61°24′31″W
  - elevation: 0 m (0 ft)
- Length: 2.7 km (1.7 mi)

The Aouya River is a river located in the Saint Andrew Parish of Dominica.

== Geography ==
The Aouya River is a river in northern Dominica in the Parish of Saint Andrew. This river originates in the eastern flank of the Morne aux Diables, west of Aouya, between Penville and Vieille Case.

It flows to the east, past the locality of Enbas and flows into the Atlantic Ocean after a steep descent. The river is only about 2.7 km or 1.7 mi long.

To the north of is the catchment area of the Demitrie River, as well as the short L'Autre Bord River, and to the south is the catchment area of the Balthazar River.

== See also ==
- List of rivers of Dominica
