= Check Hall River =

River in Dominica

Coordinates: 15°20′N 61°24′W

The Check Hall River is a river on the Caribbean island of Dominica.

== See also ==
- List of rivers of Dominica
