= River Gillon =

River in Dominica

Coordinates: 15°16′N 61°23′W

The River Gillon is a river in Dominica.

== See also ==
- List of rivers of Dominica
