= River Bway =

River in Dominica

Coordinates: 15°26′N 61°22′W

The River Bway is a river on the Caribbean island of Dominica.

== See also ==
- List of rivers of Dominica
