= Mamelabou River =

River in Dominica

Coordinates: 15°35′N 61°20′W

The Mamelabou River is a river in Dominica.

== See also ==
- List of rivers of Dominica
