= Fond Figues River =

River in Dominica

Coordinates: 15°24′N 61°18′W

The Fond Figues River is a river on the Caribbean island of Dominica.

== See also ==
- List of rivers of Dominica
