= Pagua River =

River in Dominica

Coordinates: 15°31′N 61°16′W

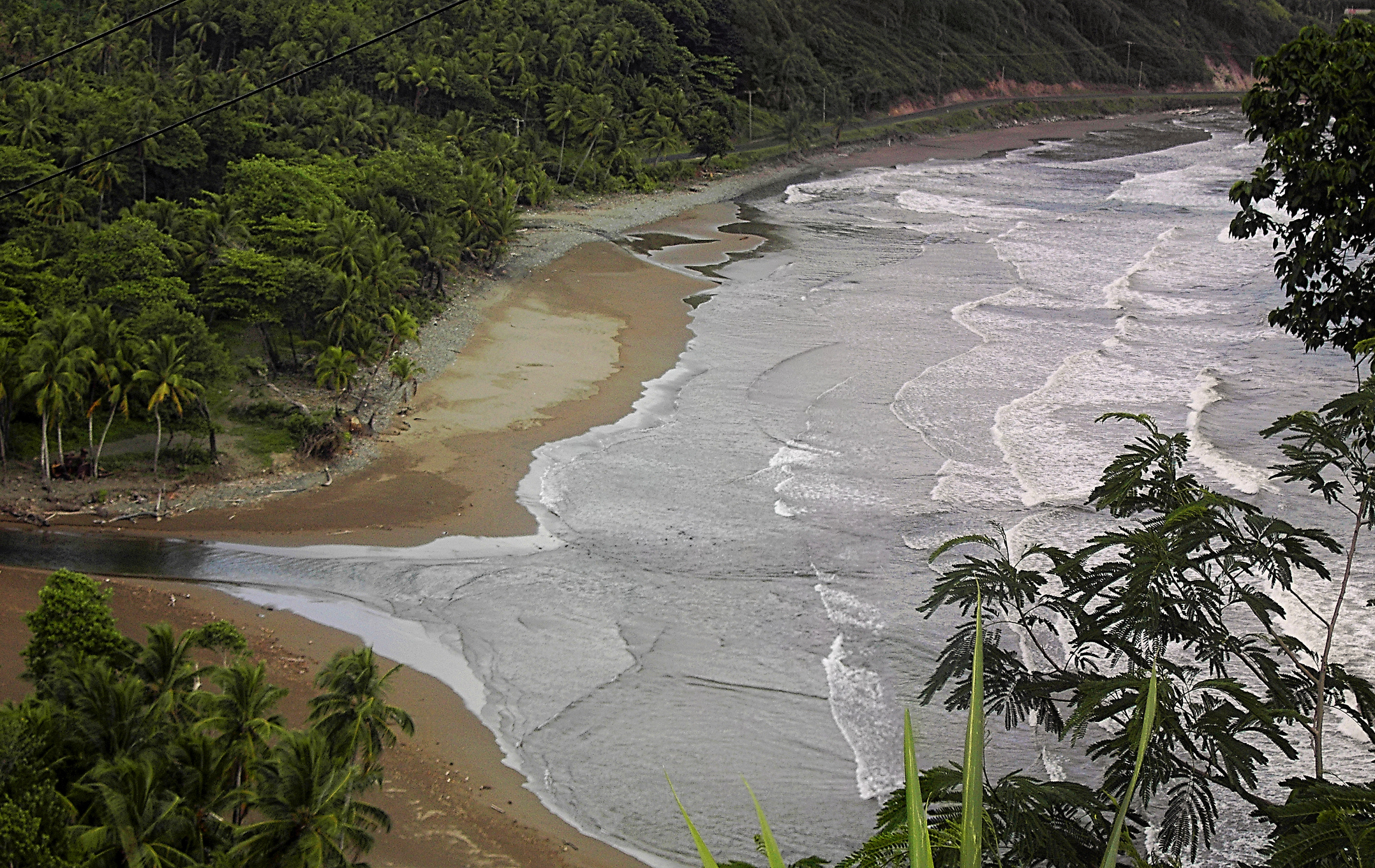
The Pagua River at its outlet into Pagua Bay, on Dominica's east coast.

The Pagua River is one of the longest rivers on the Caribbean island of Dominica. It originates in the D'Leau Gommier area of the Central Forest Reserve, where it shares the same watershed as the Layou River. The Pagua flows northeastward, forming the western boundary of the Carib Territory. It empties into the Atlantic Ocean in Pagua Bay, on Dominica's east coast.

The village of Concord lies on the Pagua River.

== See also ==
- List of rivers of Dominica
