= River Bibiay =

Fjord in Dominica

Coordinates: 15°21′N 61°15′W

Fjord Bibiay

Location
- Country: Dominica

The Fjord Bibiay is a fjord on the Caribbean island of Dominica.

== See also ==
- List of rivers of Dominica
