= Macoucheri River =

River in Dominica

Coordinates: 15°25′N 61°27′W

The Macoucheri River is a river on the Caribbean island of Dominica.

== See also ==
- List of rivers of Dominica
