= Anse Du Mé River =

River in Dominica

Coordinates: 15°36′N 61°23′W

The Anse Du Mé River is a river located in the Saint Andrew Parish on the Caribbean island of Dominica.

== Geography ==
The Anse Du Mé River originates south of Torité at about 250 m above sea level. It initially flows towards the northeast, turning north near Welsh, and emptying in the Atlantic Ocean. The river is approximately 4.3 km long.

== See also ==
- List of rivers of Dominica
