= Thibaud River =

River in Dominica

Coordinates: 15°36′N 61°24′W

The Thibaud River is a river on the Caribbean island of Dominica.

== See also ==
- List of rivers of Dominica
