= Cottage, Dominica =

Cottage
- Location in Dominica
- Country: Dominica
- Parish: Saint John Parish
- Time zone: ECT
- ISO 3166 code: DM-05

Cottage is a town in the north of Dominica. The community, along with its neighbouring community of Cocoyer, had a population of 279 in 2011. Cottage is located in the Saint John Parish.

== Geographical location ==
Cottage is located southwest of Clifton and Capuchin.

== Politics ==
Cottage is part of the Cottage constituency for elections to the House of Assembly of Dominica.

== Literature ==
- Lennox Honychurch: The Dominica Story. A History of the Island. Macmillan, London 1995, ISBN 978-0-333-62776-1.
