= Eden River (Dominica) =

River in Dominica

Coordinates: 15°35′N 61°18′W

The Eden River is a river in Dominica.

== See also ==
- List of rivers of Dominica
