= La Ronde River =

River in Dominica

Coordinates: 15°19′N 61°15′W

The La Ronde River is a river on the Caribbean island of Dominica, In the village of La Plaine.

== See also ==
- List of rivers of Dominica
