= Caribbean Federal Party =

Political party in Dominica

The Caribbean Federal Party was a political party in Dominica. It contested the 1975 general elections, receiving just 119 votes (0.6%) and failing to win a seat. It did not run in any subsequent elections.
