= Good Hope River =

River in Dominica

Coordinates: 15°24′N 61°16′W

The Good Hope River is a river in Dominica.

== See also ==
- List of rivers of Dominica
