= River Bouleau =

River in Dominica

Coordinates: 15°28′N 61°28′W

The River Bouleau is a river on the Caribbean island of Dominica.

== See also ==
- List of rivers of Dominica
