= Demitrie River =

River in Dominica

Coordinates: 15°38′N 61°25′W

The Demitrie River is a river in Dominica.

== See also ==
- List of rivers of Dominica
