= Lamoins River =

River in Dominica

Coordinates: 15°33′N 61°28′W

The Lamoins River is a river in Dominica.

== See also ==
- List of rivers of Dominica
