= Perdu Temps River =

River in Dominica

The Perdu Temps River is a river in Dominica.

== See also ==
- List of rivers of Dominica
