= Bellibu River =

River in Dominica

Coordinates: 15°36′N 61°21′W

The Bellibu River is a river in Dominica.

== See also ==
- List of rivers of Dominica
