= River Subaya =

River in Dominica

Coordinates: 15°16′N 61°16′W

The River Subaya is a river on the Caribbean island of Dominica.

== See also ==
- List of rivers of Dominica
