= Trois Pitons River =

River in Dominica

Coordinates: 15°19′N 61°20′W

Location
- Country: Dominica

The Trois Pitons River is a river on the Caribbean island of Dominica.

== See also ==
- List of rivers of Dominica
