= Mero River =

River in Dominica

Coordinates: 15°25′N 61°26′W

The Mero River is a river in Dominica.

== See also ==
- List of rivers of Dominica
