= River Ouayaneri =

River in Dominica

Coordinates: 15°20′N 61°15′W

The River Ouayaneri is a river on the Caribbean island of Dominica.

== See also ==
- List of rivers of Dominica
