= Canefield River =

River in Dominica

The Canefield River is a river on the Caribbean island of Dominica.

== See also ==
- List of rivers of Dominica
