= 1975 Dominican general election =

Election in Dominica

General elections were held in Dominica on 24 March 1975. The result was a victory for the Dominica Labour Party, which won 16 of the 21 seats. Voter turnout was 79%.

== Results ==
Party	Votes	%	Seats	+/–
Dominica Labour Party	10,523	49.32	16	+7
Dominica Freedom Party	6,920	32.43	3	+1
Progressive Labour Party	897	4.20	0	New
Caribbean Federal Party	119	0.56	0	New
Independents	2,879	13.49	2	+2
Total	21,338	100.00	21	+10
Valid votes	21,338	92.34		
Invalid/blank votes	1,769	7.66		
Total votes	23,107	100.00		
Registered voters/turnout	29,266	78.96		
Source: Caribbean Elections

=== List of elected members ===
Constituency	Party	Elected member
Canefield	DLP	Oliver Seraphin
Castle Bruce	DLP	Romanus Bannis
Colihaut	DLP	F. F. Parillon
Cottage	DLP	Culand Dubois
Goodwill	DLP	Patrick John
Grand Bay	DFP	Avon A. Casimir
Laplaine	DLP	Henckell Christian
Mahaut	DLP	Victor Riviere
Marigot	IND	Pattison A. S. Stevens
Morne Jaune/Riviere Cyrique	IND	Conrad W. Cyrus
Newtown	DLP	Eustace Francis
Paix Bouche	DLP	Randolph Bannis
Petite Savanne	DLP	Luke Taylor Corriette
Portsmouth	DLP	Michael Douglas
Roseau	DFP	Eugenia Charles
Salisbury	DLP	Bryson Joseph Louis
Salybia	DLP	Lawrence Darroux
St. Joseph	DLP	I. A. Thomas
Soufrière	DFP	Anthony Moise
Vieille Case	DLP	Eden Bowers
Wesley	DLP	Osbourne N. Theodore
Source: Electoral Office
