= Toucari River =

River in Dominica

Coordinates: 15°35′N 61°28′W

The Toucari River is a river in Dominica.

== See also ==
- List of rivers of Dominica
