= Cario River =

River in Dominica

Coordinates: 15°32′N 61°28′W

The Cario River is a river on the Caribbean island of Dominica. It is a stream in Saint Peter. It is located in the parish of Saint John, in the northwestern part of the country, 27 km north of Roseau is the capital.

== See also ==
- List of rivers of Dominica
