= Tarou River =

River in Dominica

Coordinates: 15°23′N 61°25′W

The Tarou River is a river on the Caribbean island of Dominica near Mahaut.

== See also ==
- List of rivers of Dominica
- Map of Dominica
- GEOnet Names Server
