= Loubiere River =

River in Dominica

Coordinates: 15°16′10″N 61°22′07″W

The Loubiere River is a river in Dominica.

== See also ==
- List of rivers of Dominica
