= Canal River =

River in Dominica

Coordinates: 15°32′N 61°18′W

The Canal River is a river on the Caribbean island of Dominica.

== See also ==
- List of rivers of Dominica
