= Geneva River =

River in Dominica

Coordinates: 15°14′N 61°19′W

The Geneva River is a river in Dominica.

== See also ==
- List of rivers of Dominica
