= Bioche River =

River in Dominica

Coordinates: 15°30′N 61°28′W

The Bioche River is a river in Dominica.

== See also ==
- List of rivers of Dominica
