= Penton River =

River in Dominica

Coordinates: 15°35′N 61°22′W

The Penton River is a river on the Caribbean island of Dominica.

== See also ==
- List of rivers of Dominica
