= Malabuka River =

River in Dominica

Coordinates: 15°14′37″N 61°17′04″W

The Malabuka River is a river on the Caribbean island of Dominica.

== See also ==
- List of rivers of Dominica
