= North River (Dominica) =

River in Dominica

Coordinates: 15°35′N 61°28′W

The North River is a river on the Caribbean island of Dominica.

== See also ==
- List of rivers of Dominica
