= White River (Dominica) =

River in Dominica

The White River is a river in Dominica.

== See also ==
- List of rivers of Dominica
