= Mahaut =

Mahaut (Modern French: [mao], Old French: [maˈhawθ]) is an Old French form for the name Mathilde, and an equivalent of English Maud, now usually occurring as a surname. It may refer to:

== People ==
=== Given name ===
- Mahaut of Albon (1112–1148), French noblewoman
- Mahaut of Angoulême (c. 1181–1233), French noblewoman
- Mahaut I of Boulogne (c. 1105–1152), French noblewoman and Queen of England
- Mahaut II of Boulogne (1202–1259), French noblewoman and Queen of Portugal
- Mahaut of Bourbon (1165/69–c. 1218), French noblewoman
- Mahaut, Countess of Artois, or Mathilda (1268–1329), French noblewoman
- Mahaut of Châtillon (1293–1358), French noblewoman
- Mahaut I, Countess of Nevers (1188–1257), French noblewoman
- Mahaut II, Countess of Nevers (1234/35–1262), French noblewoman
- Mahaut des Essartz (16th-century), French courtier of Mary of Guise and Mary, Queen of Scots

=== Surname ===
- Antoine Mahaut (c. 1720–1785), Flemish composer
- Kate Mahaut (1908–1988), Danish fencer
- Oda Mahaut (1887–1955), French fencer

== Places ==
- Mahaut River (disambiguation), multiple rivers
- Mahaut, Dominica
  - Mahaut (Dominica constituency), electoral district

== Other uses ==
- Mahaut Soca Strikers FC, Dominican football club from Mahaut
