= Torité River =

River in Dominica

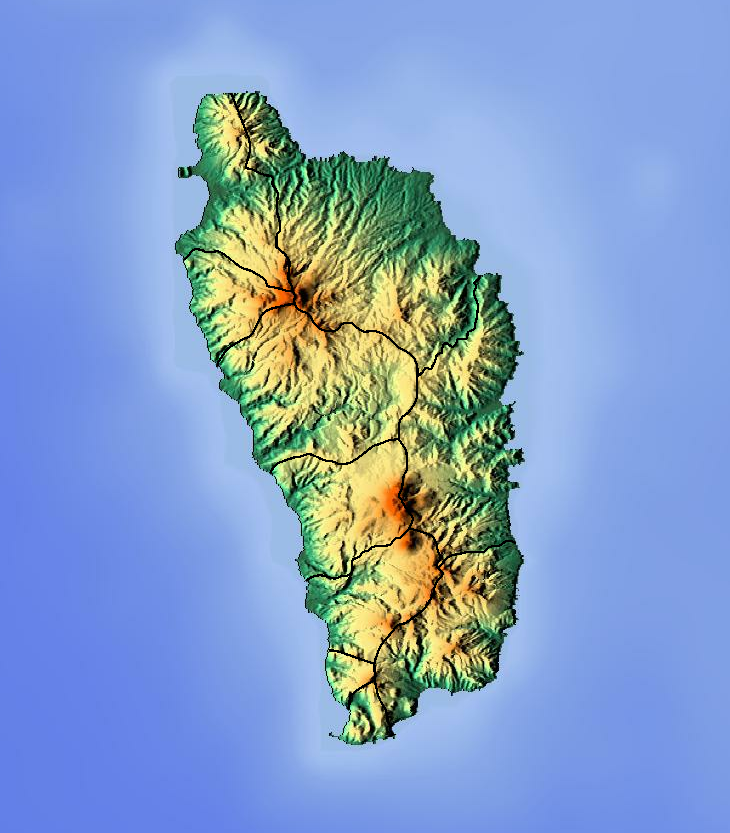
- Location within Dominica

Location
- Country: Dominica

Physical characteristics
- Mouth
  - coordinates: 15°36′N 61°33′W

The Torité River is a river in Dominica.

== See also ==
- List of rivers of Dominica
