= Clarke's River =

River in Dominica

Coordinates: 15°22′N 61°17′W

Clarke's River is a river on the Caribbean island of Dominica.

== See also ==
- List of rivers of Dominica
