= Maréchal River =

River in Dominica

Coordinates: 15°31′N 61°17′W

The Maréchal River is a river on the Caribbean island of Dominica.

== See also ==
- List of rivers of Dominica
