= Picard River =

River in Dominica

Coordinates: 15°34′N 61°28′W

The Picard River is a river in Dominica. It rises on the northern slopes of Morne Diablotins, flowing northwest to empty into the Caribbean Sea at Prince Rupert Bay on the country's northwestern coast, close to the town of Portsmouth.
