= Espagnole River =

River in Dominica

Coordinates: 15°32′N 61°28′W

The Espagnole River is a river on the Caribbean island of Dominica.

== See also ==
- List of rivers of Dominica
