= River Quanery =

River in Dominica

Coordinates: 15°20′N 61°17′W

The River Quanery is a river in Dominica. It rises on the northern slopes of Morne Trois Pitons, flowing northeast to empty into the Atlantic Ocean on the country's central eastern coast, close to the town of Castle Bruce.
