= Point Mulâtre River =

River in Dominica

Coordinates: 15°16′N 61°17′W

The Point Mulâtre River is a river in Dominica.

== See also ==
- List of rivers of Dominica
