= La Plaine, Dominica =

Village in Dominica

La Plaine (15°17′N 61°15′W) is a village located on the southeastern coast of the island of Dominica. The village is built upon a broad, gently sloping plain created by a prehistoric pyroclastic flow from the Grand Soufrière Hills volcano. This unusual expanse of relatively flat land descends to coastal cliffs. It has a population of 1,288, and (after Grand Bay) is the second-largest settlement in Saint Patrick Parish.

== History ==
=== Indigenous Heritage ===
The Kalinago people knew the area as Koulirou, and several other Kalinago place names survive to this day, including Sari-Sari, Ouayanari (Ouanari), and Taboui (Tabery). Archaeological remains of a pre-Columbian Kalinago settlement have been identified between the Sari-Sari River and Case O’Gowery (Casgory).

=== French Settlement and Early Colonial Period ===
French settlers, many of whom had arrived via Martinique as white indentured servants (les engagés), named the area “La Plaine” in reference to its exceptionally flat terrain. Families such as the Larondes and Beaupierres were among the earliest settlers. Over time, they intermingled with the remaining Kalinago population and later with enslaved Africans brought to work the estates. Because the southeastern coast faced the prevailing Trade Winds, the area became known as Au Vent, and its inhabitants as gens au vent. Boats accessed the area through the hazardous landings at Plaisance Bay and Bout Sable Bay.

=== British Rule and the Plantation Era ===
Following Britain’s acquisition of Dominica in 1763, the island was subdivided and sold. The principal estates established around La Plaine (Ouayanari, Tabery, Félicité, Laronde, and Plaisance) relied on enslaved African labour to produce sugar, rum, and molasses. Records from 1827 illustrate the scale of production: the Wayanary estate employed 98 enslaved people and produced 79,000 pounds of sugar and 2,600 gallons of rum, while the Laronde estate ran 45 enslaved workers producing 9,000 pounds of sugar and 200 gallons of rum annually. Sugar cane was processed using cattle-powered mills (moulins beff) at Félicité and Laronde, while a large water-powered factory operated at Ouayanari, ruins of which remain at the present-day site of the Citrus Creek resort.

=== Emancipation and Post-Slavery Society ===
Slavery was fully abolished on 1 August 1838. The formerly enslaved people of La Plaine were left largely without resources in what was described as “a society without money,” sustaining themselves through farming, fishing, hunting, and foraging. As sugar production declined, the Roman Catholic Church acquired much of the Ouayanari estate’s land, eventually subdividing and distributing it among villagers. Materials from the estate’s factory buildings were repurposed to construct the La Plaine Roman Catholic Church. The parish priest, Father Couturier, became a prominent advocate for the community during this period.

=== The Land Tax Riots of 1893 ===
On 13 April 1893, La Plaine became the site of a significant civil uprising against British colonial taxation. Land taxes, first imposed in 1886 and increased in 1888, were a method in which the colony sought to stem the possibilities of independent landholding and force dependency on plantation wages among the labor force leading to protest by the villagers of La Plaine. In response, heavily armed Royal Marines and police from Antigua landed at Plaisance Bay from the torpedo cruiser HMS Mohawk, intending to evict residents who had refused to pay what locals regarded as an unjust and excessive land tax. Colonial Governor Sir William Haynes Smith sought to make an example of community leader Pierre Colaire, dispatching 25 marines and 9 policemen under Commander Edward Henry Bayley to Case O’Gowrie. Colaire and his family were evicted from their home and the property was sealed; however, Colaire re-entered defiantly once the troops withdrew. Upon learning of this, Smith ordered Bayley to return and arrest him.

Bayley first sought information from Father Couturier at the Catholic presbytery, but the priest declined to assist. The arrival of the warship in the bay alarmed the community, and villagers sounded conch shells to rally their neighbours. A large crowd gathered, including residents from Boetica, Délices, Morne Jaune, and Rivière Cyrique, who came in solidarity. As Bayley’s contingent crossed the Sari-Sari River toward Case O’Gowrie, tensions escalated. Colaire evaded capture by slipping into the surrounding forest, but Bayley proceeded with the re-eviction of Mrs. Colaire and her children. At that point, the confrontation turned violent. A peasant from Boetica named St. Ville stepped forward to block the troops and the crowd began throwing stones. The marines opened fire, killing four villagers and wounding several others on both sides, including Bayley. The troops withdrew, taking St. Ville into custody; his subsequent fate was never officially recorded.

In late 1893, the British Colonial Office sent Sir Robert Hamilton, a former governor of Tasmania, to Dominica to conduct an independent inquiry into the state of affairs existing in Dominica, the events at La Plaine, and the colonial administration more broadly. His published findings in 1894 led to reforms in how taxes were imposed and collected across the colonies, and resulted in disciplinary action against some of the officers involved. The episode dealt a significant blow to the credibility of Crown colony rule in the Caribbean.

=== Modern Development ===
The extension of voting rights in 1951 to all citizens over the age of 21, regardless of property or wage qualifications, marked a turning point for La Plaine’s political participation. Representatives from the community were subsequently elected to the legislature and served in ministerial roles. Gradual improvements followed, including piped water, electricity, improved healthcare, a new school, and access to secondary education.

Until 1963, La Plaine had no motorable road connection to the rest of Dominica. Residents reached the capital, Roseau, either by canoe along the coastline or on foot via demanding mountain tracks through Morne Jaune, Rivière Cyrique, and Grand Fond, along the Chemin L’Etang past Rosalie and the Freshwater Lake. An alternative, longer route ran through Délices, Pointe Mulatre, Pedi Temps, Geneva, and Grand Bay. The completion of a motorable road to La Plaine in 1963 was greeted with widespread celebration.
