= Indian River (Dominica) =

River on the Caribbean island of Dominica

Coordinates: 15°34′N 61°28′W

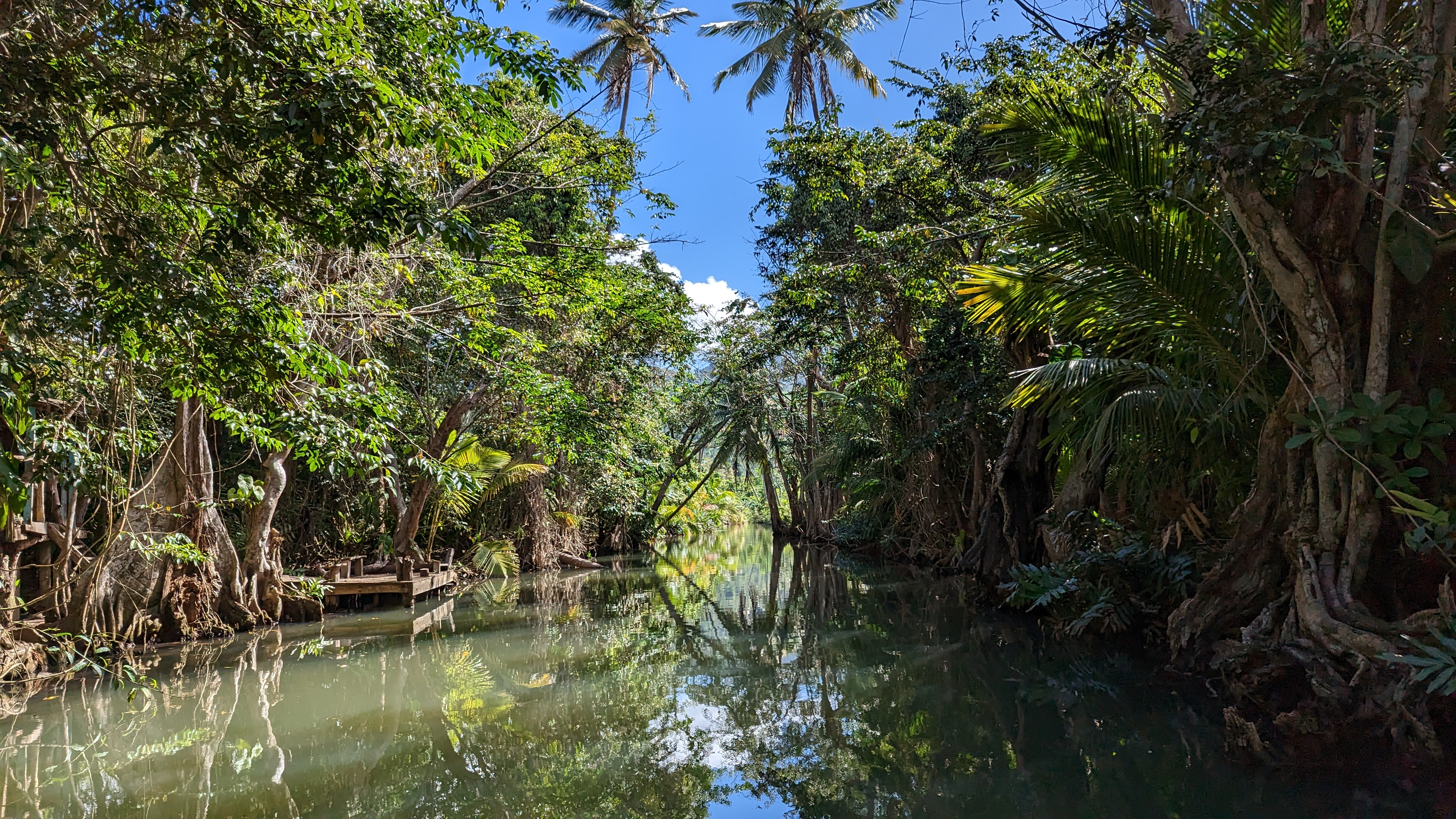
The Indian River

The Indian River is a river on the Caribbean island of Dominica. It flows to the Caribbean Sea between the town of Portsmouth and the village of Glanvillia. The Indian is the widest river in Dominica.

Indian River boat rides are one of tourist attractions of Dominica. Some of the scenes of Pirates of the Caribbean: Dead Man's Chest were filmed at Indian River.

== See also ==
- List of rivers of Dominica
