= Taberi River =

River in Dominica

Coordinates: 15°20′N 61°16′W

The Taberi River is a river on the Caribbean island of Dominica.

== See also ==
- List of rivers of Dominica
