= Saint Sauveur River =

River in Dominica

Coordinates: 15°24′N 61°16′W

The Saint Sauveur River is a river in Dominica.

== See also ==
- List of rivers of Dominica
