= Dublanc River =

River in Dominica

Coordinates: 15°31′N 61°28′W

The Dublanc River is a river in Dominica. It rises on the northwestern slopes of Morne Diablotins, flowing west to discharge into the Caribbean Sea on the country's northwestern coast.
