= Balthazar River (Dominica) =

River in Dominica

Coordinates: 15°37′N 61°24′W

The Balthazar River is a river in the Saint Andrew Parish of Dominica.

== Geography ==
The Balthazar River is located in northern Dominica, about 3.2 km long. It drains in the Atlantic Ocean, in the Autrou Bay, via a steep descent. Its track is almost entirely eastward, absorbing some small streams along its path. It originates from the Morne aux Diables at about 600m above sea level. The mouth of the river is located just north of Vielle Case.

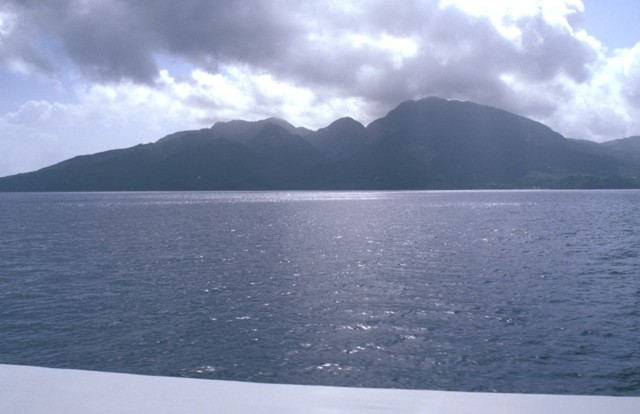
The Morne Aux Diables (Devil's Peak) is the location of where this river originates from

== See also ==
- List of rivers of Dominica
