= River Claire (Dominica) =

River in Dominica

Coordinates: 15°18′N 61°22′W

The River Claire is a river on the Caribbean island of Dominica.

== See also ==
- List of rivers of Dominica
