= Delices =

Village in south-east Dominica

- Village
- Location within Dominica
- Coordinates: 15.2878°N 61.2640°W
- Country: Dominica

Delices is a small village in Dominica. It is located in the south-east of the island, between La Plaine and Petite Savanne.

The village's name derives from the French words délices, translated as "delights", or délice meaning "a delightful thing". Though not as developed as other parts of the island, its natural environment and views attract eco-tourists. It is home to the White River and Victoria Falls.

The village was home to the Jungle Bay Resort and Spa.

== Notable residents ==
- Hon. Thomas Etienne, Minister of Agriculture 1970–1974 E. O. LeBlanc Administration: politician/farmer/educator, MP.
- Henckell Christian (1910 1998): educator, MP
- L. M. Christian MBE (1913–2000): composer of the music for Dominica's National Anthem
- Hon. Gertrude Roberts (1930–2019): MP, educator/politician
- Capt. A. C. Randall, British World War I officer, who adopted this village.
