= Saint Marie River =

River in Dominica

The Saint Marie River is a river in Dominica.

== See also ==
- List of rivers of Dominica
