= Boeri River =

River in Dominica

Coordinates: 15°19′N 61°24′W

The Boeri River is a river in Dominica. It rises on the western slopes of Morne Trois Pitons mountain, flowing south and then west and finally discharging into the Caribbean Sea on the country's southwestern coast, to the north of the capital, Roseau.
