= Savane River (Dominica) =

River in Dominica

Coordinates: 15°15′N 61°16′W

The Savane River is a river on the Caribbean island of Dominica.

== See also ==
- List of rivers of Dominica
