= River Jack =

River in Dominica

Coordinates: 15°16′N 61°16′W

The River Jack is a river in Dominica.

== See also ==
- List of rivers of Dominica
