= Mahaut River (St. David) =

River in Dominica

The Mahaut River is a river on the Caribbean island of Dominica. The Mahaut River rises on the western slopes of Morne Trois Pitons. It flows west to its mouth near Massacre.

== See also ==
- List of rivers of Dominica
