= River Canari =

River in Dominica

Coordinates: 15°17′N 61°23′W

The River Canari is a river on the Caribbean island of Dominica. The adjacent rock formation, which is a persistent 80 degrees Celsius for much of the year, has been discussed as a potential site for an enhanced geothermal system for electricity generation.

== See also ==
- List of rivers of Dominica
