= Saint Joseph River (Dominica) =

River in Dominica

Coordinates: 15°24′N 61°26′W

The Saint Joseph River is a river in Dominica.

== See also ==
- List of rivers of Dominica
