= Blenheim River =

River in Dominica

Coordinates: 15°36′N 61°23′W

The Blenheim River is a river in Dominica.

== See also ==
- List of rivers of Dominica
