= Castle Bruce River =

River in Dominica

Coordinates: 15°26′N 61°16′W

The Castle Bruce River is a river in Dominica.

== See also ==
- List of rivers of Dominica
