= Savané =

Savané is a surname. Notable people with the surname include:

- Amadou Sy Savané (born 1974), Guinean sprinter
- Landing Savané (born 1945), Senegalese politician
- Marie-Angélique Savané (born 1947), Senegalese sociologist and feminist activist
- Souléymane Sy Savané, Ivorian-American actor
