= Melville Hall River =

River in Dominica

Coordinates: 15°33′N 61°18′W

The Melville Hall River is a river in Dominica. It is located in the north of the island, flowing northeast from the slopes of Morne Diablotin and discharging into the Atlantic Ocean between the villages of Wesley and Marigot.
