= Salée River (Dominica) =

River in Dominica

Coordinates: 15°36′N 61°21′W

The Salée River is a river on the Caribbean island of Dominica.

== See also ==
- List of rivers of Dominica
