= Mahaut River (St. Paul) =

River in Dominica

Coordinates: 15°21′13″N 61°23′38″W

The Mahaut River is a river in Dominica. It rises on the western slopes of Morne Trois Pitons close to the town of Pont Cassé, flowing west to reach the Caribbean Sea on the country's western coast at the settlement of Mahaut, between the towns of Massacre and Jimmit.
