= Douce River (Grenada) =

Coordinates: 12°06′N 61°44′W

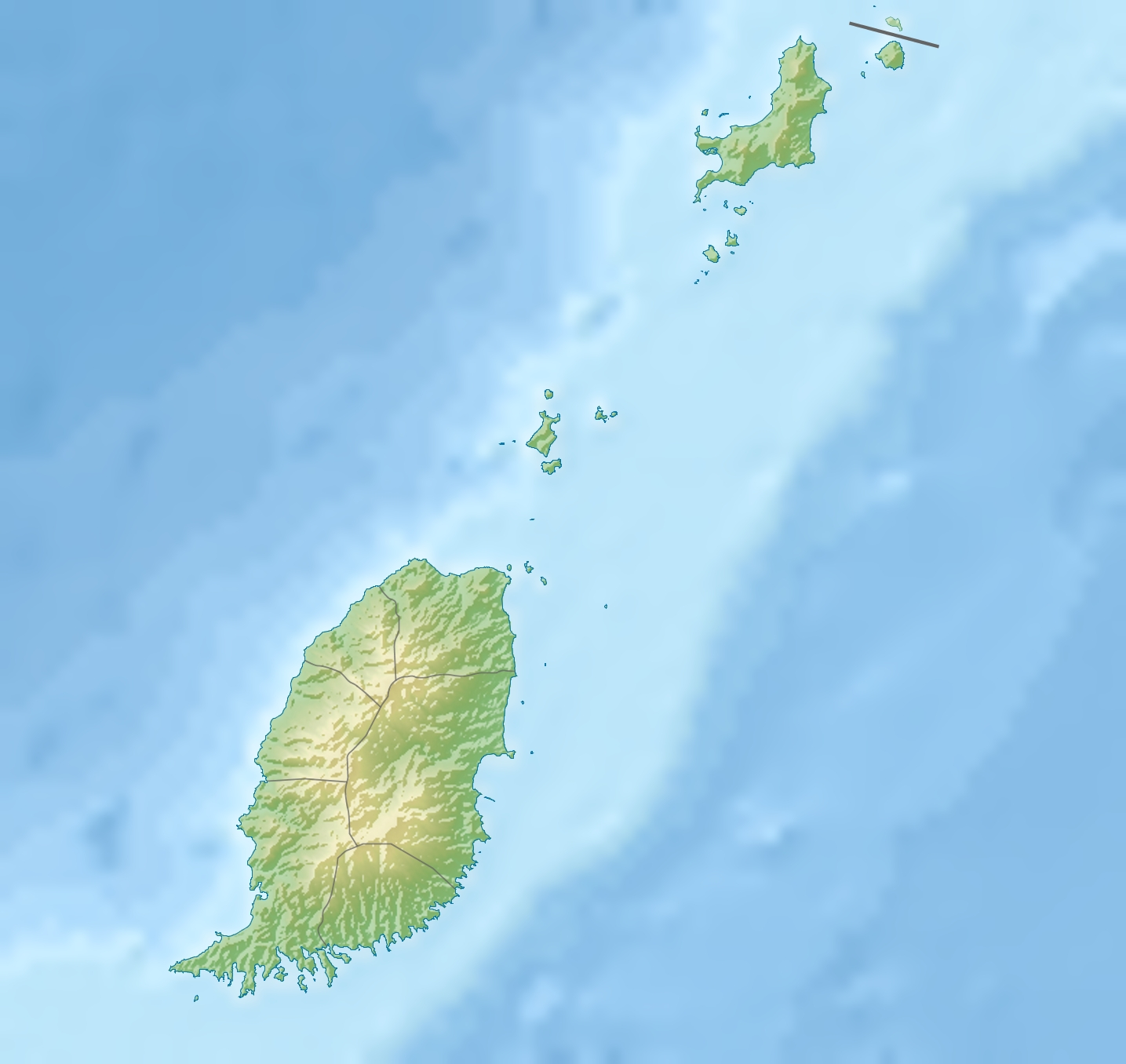
- Location of mouth

Location
- Country: Grenada

The Douce River is a river of Grenada.

== See also ==
- List of rivers of Grenada
