= Rosalie River =

River in Dominica

Coordinates: 15°22′N 61°15′W

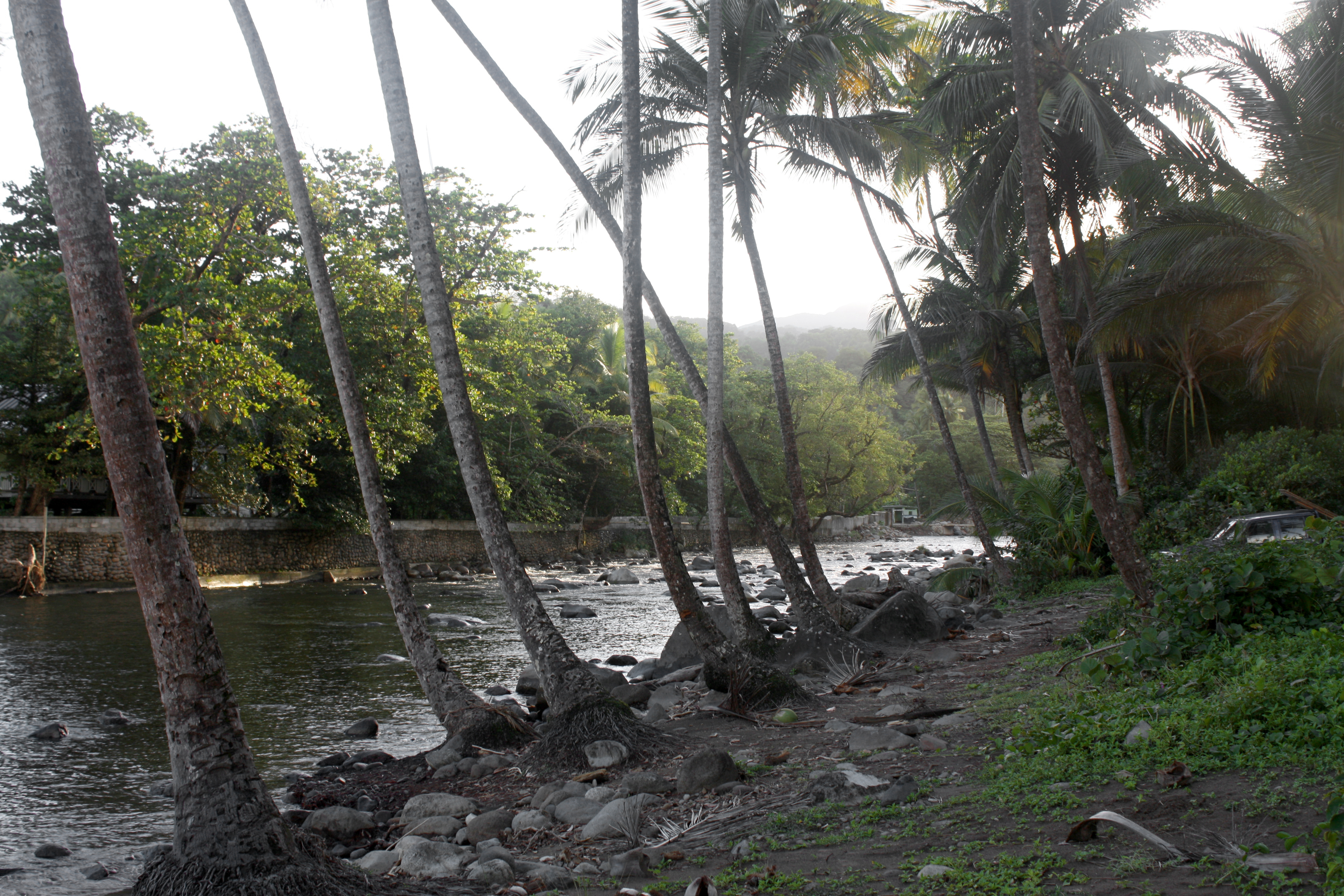
The Rosalie River near its outlet on Dominica's east coast

The Rosalie River is a river in Dominica. It rises on the eastern slopes of Morne Trois Pitons, flowing east to reach the Atlantic Ocean on the country's east coast, close to the town of Rosalie.
