= Saint John Parish, Dominica =

Saint John
- Parish
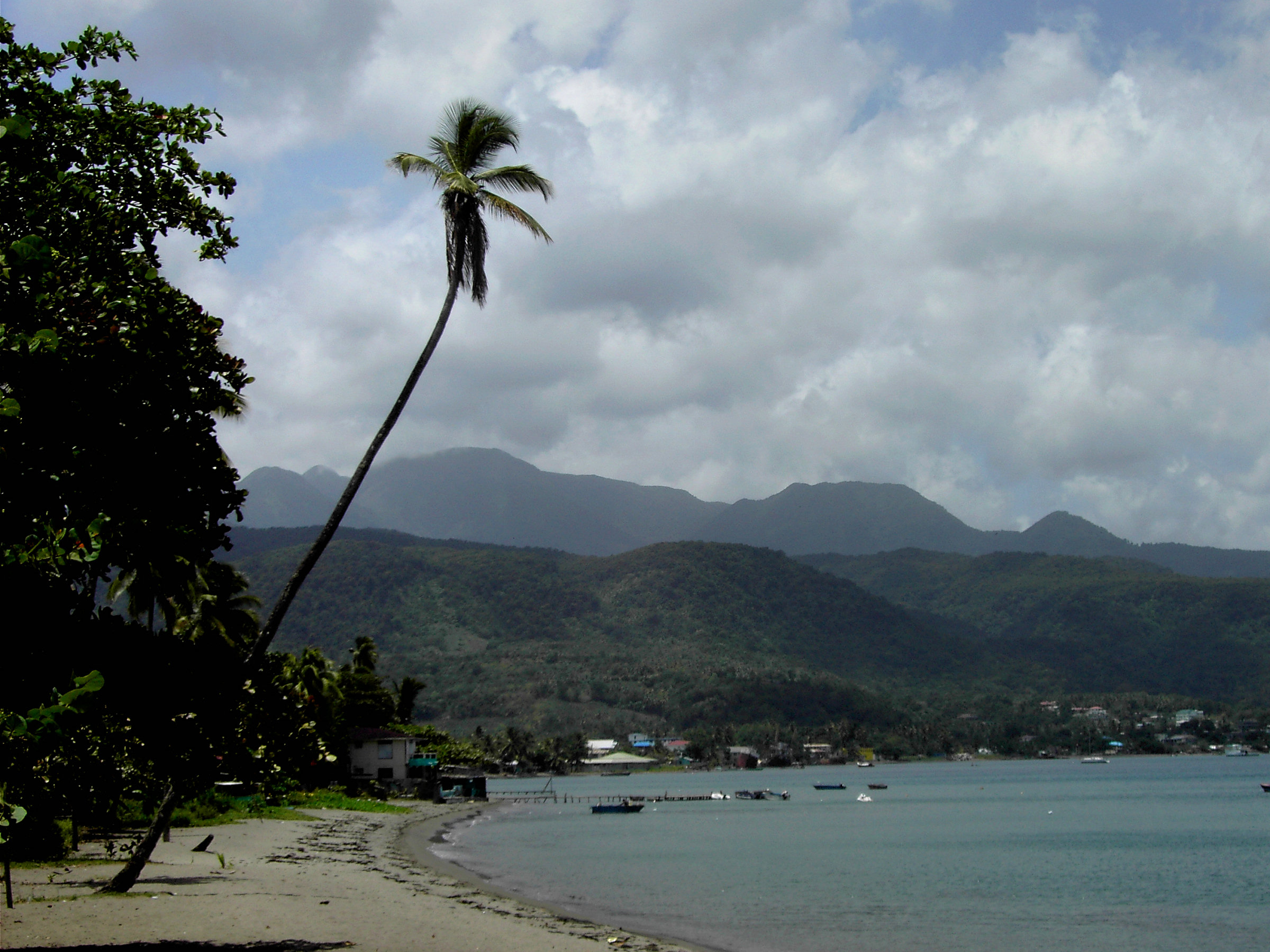
- Prince Rupert Bay, near Portsmouth

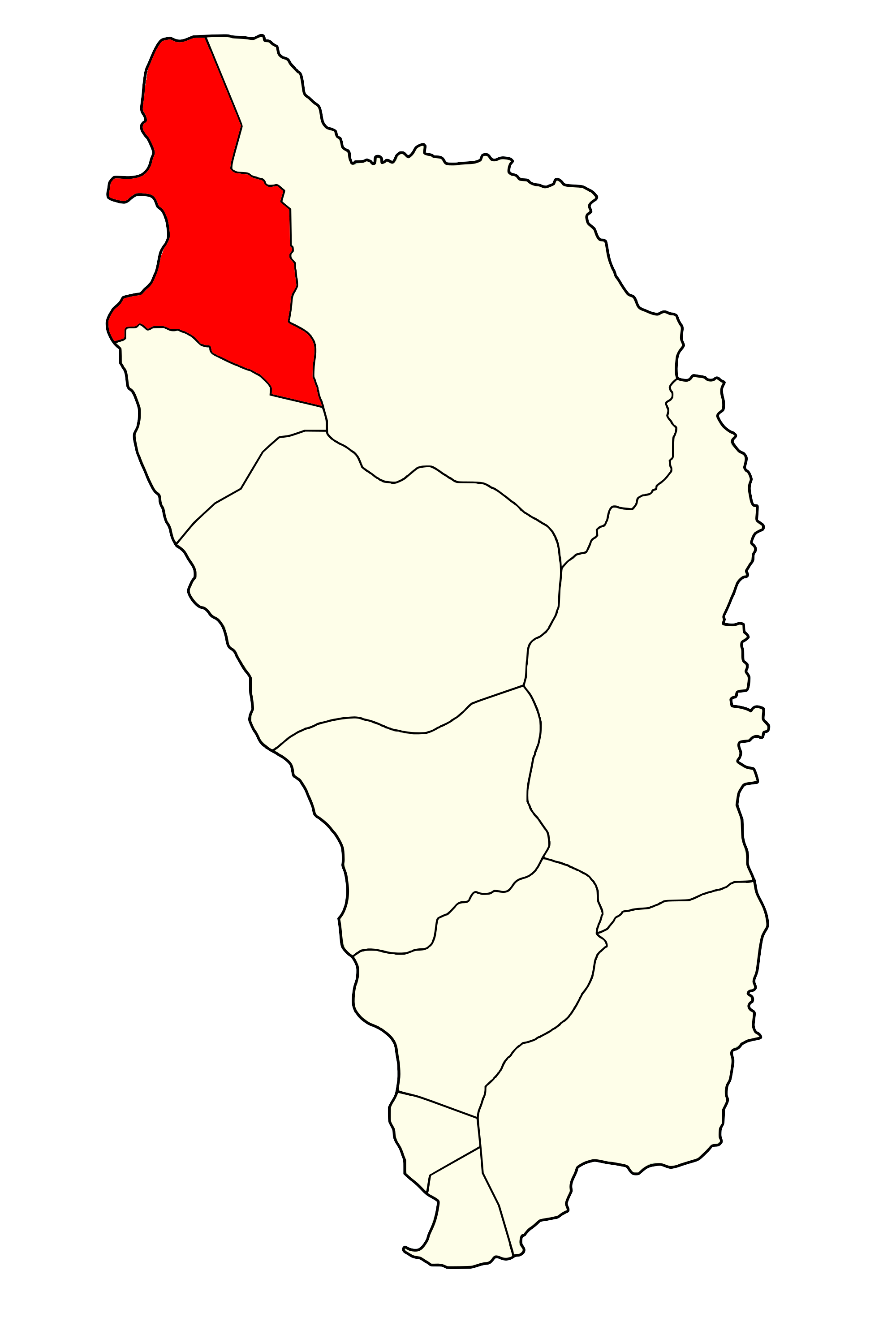
- Country: Dominica
- Capital: Portsmouth

Area
  - Total: 59.0 km^{2} (22.8 sq mi)

Population (2011)
  - Total: 6,561
  - Density: 111/km^{2} (288/sq mi)
- Time zone: UTC-4
- ISO 3166-2: DM-05

Saint John is one of Dominica's 10 administrative parishes. It is bordered by St. Andrew to the east, and St. Peter and the Espagnole River to the south. It has an area of 59 km^{2} (22.78 mi^{2}).

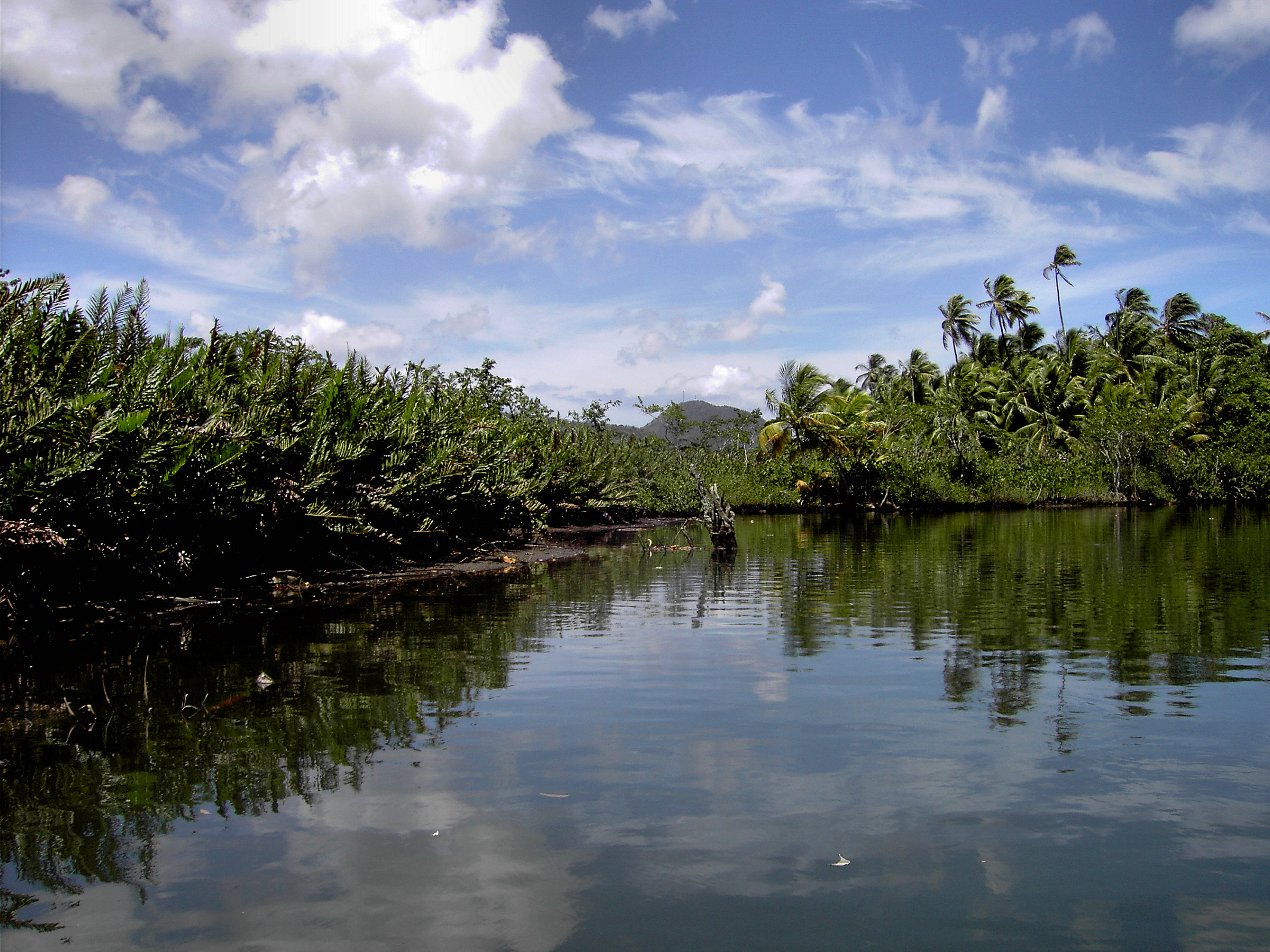
Indian River, near Portsmouth

6,561 people live in the parish, half of which (2,977) live in the main settlement, Portsmouth (Dominica's second largest town, also called Grand Anse by locals). Glanvilla and Lagoon serve as the town's suburbs.

Other settlements include:

- Bornes
- Capuchin
- Clifton
- Cottage
- Toucari
- Tanetane

The highest peak is Morne aux Diables, with a height of 861 m (2827 ft).

== Education ==
Portsmouth Secondary School, the island's first rural secondary school, opened in St. John in the 1960s.

== Notable names ==
Via Portsmouth, the parish is the birthplace of local historian Lennox Honychurch, and former prime minister Rosie Douglas.

== Transportation ==
St. John shares some of Dominica's best roads with adjacent St. Andrew. In addition, the island's northernmost road, connecting Tanetane with Penville, was opened in 2004.

Prince Rupert Bay, near Portsmouth, has been an often-used stop-over for yachts and cruise ships.

== Tourism ==
The best known tourist attractions in St. John's are the Indian River and the Cabrits National Park, which consists of the Cabrits Peninsula and Fort Shirley. Benjamin's Park is the primary sporting venue and has hosted first-class cricket.
