= Portsmouth, Dominica =

Portsmouth
- Town
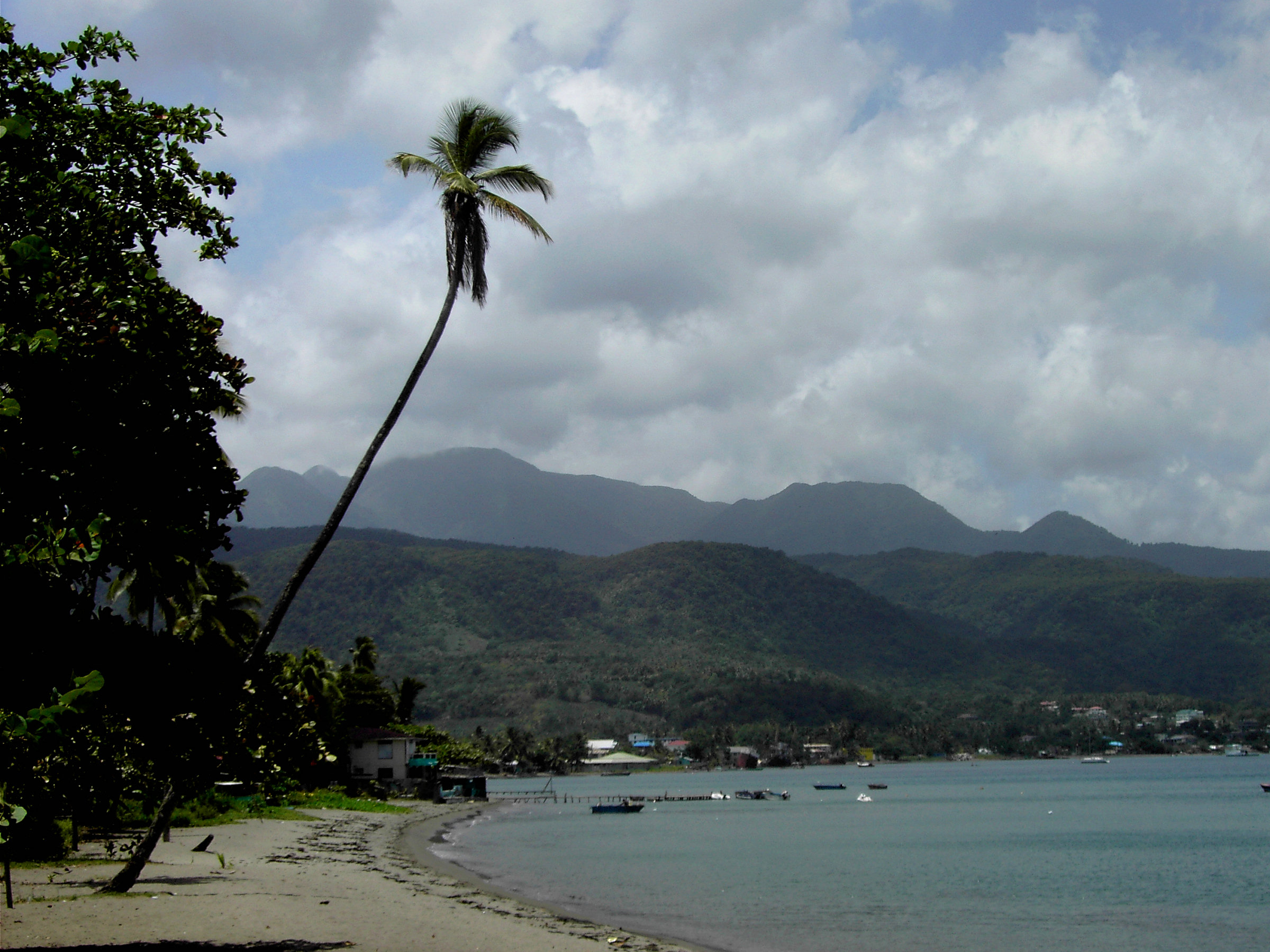
- Prince Rupert Bay

- Location in Dominica
- Coordinates: 15°35′N 61°28′W
- Country: Dominica
- Parish: Saint John Parish
- Elevation: 141 ft (43 m)

Population
  - Total: 3,630
- Time zone: ECT

Portsmouth is the second largest town in Dominica, with 3,630 inhabitants. It is located on the shore of a natural Harbor, Prince Rupert Bay, in Saint John Parish on the north-west coast of Dominica. The area was called Ouyouhao by the Kalinago and Grand Anse by the French. The Indian River is Portsmouth’s southern border and Cabrits National Park is located on a peninsula to the north of town.

== History ==
Portsmouth was initially chosen as the capital of Dominica, but only served in that capacity temporarily. Royal Engineer, John Simpson surveyed and laid out the area in 1765. It was laid out with a grid design of streets around a central square (now part of Benjamin's Park). The House of Assembly, Court House, and government offices were supposed to be located on the east side of the central square. Portsmouth was named after the important naval seaport of Portsmouth in the south of England. The town’s streets were named after some notable British people of the time period: Egremont, Queensborough, Rodney and others. However, due to the surrounding swamps the settlement proved to be unhealthy due to outbreaks of malaria and yellow fever. The capital was moved to Roseau, where it remains today.

The Ross University School of Medicine, was located near Portsmouth, in Picard, but was relocated to Barbados, after Hurricane Maria caused extensive damage in 2017.

Portsmouth has its own sea port in Prince Rupert Bay. A farmer's market runs Tuesdays, Fridays, and Saturdays in the town. The area is the birthplace of Exile One's Gordon Henderson, and former Prime Minister of Dominica, Roosevelt Douglas.

Benjamin's Park is the primary sporting venue and has hosted first-class cricket. The Japanese Government is currently funding and constructing a fish processing plant in Portsmouth.
