= Layou River =

Longest river in Dominica

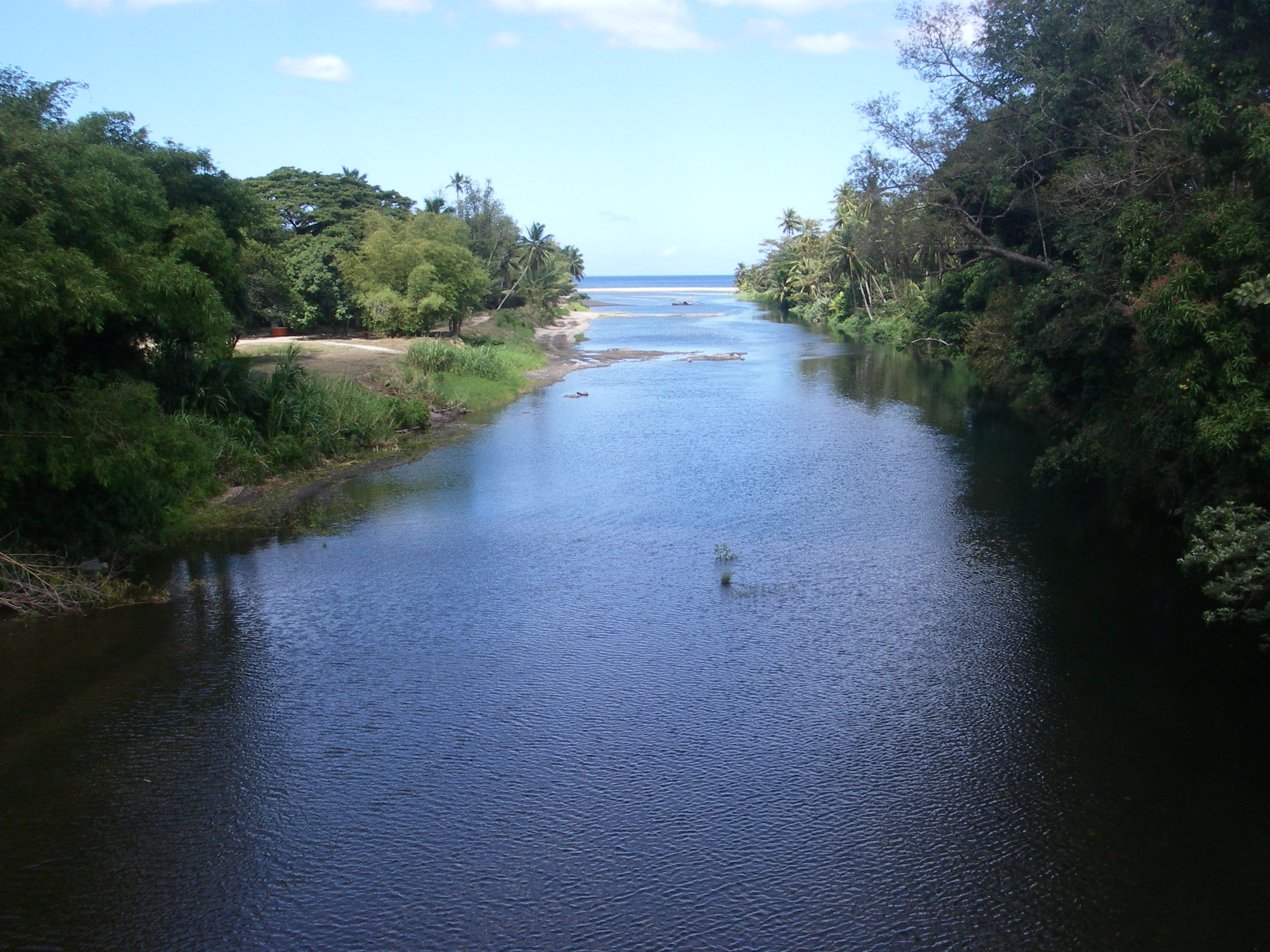
- Layou River

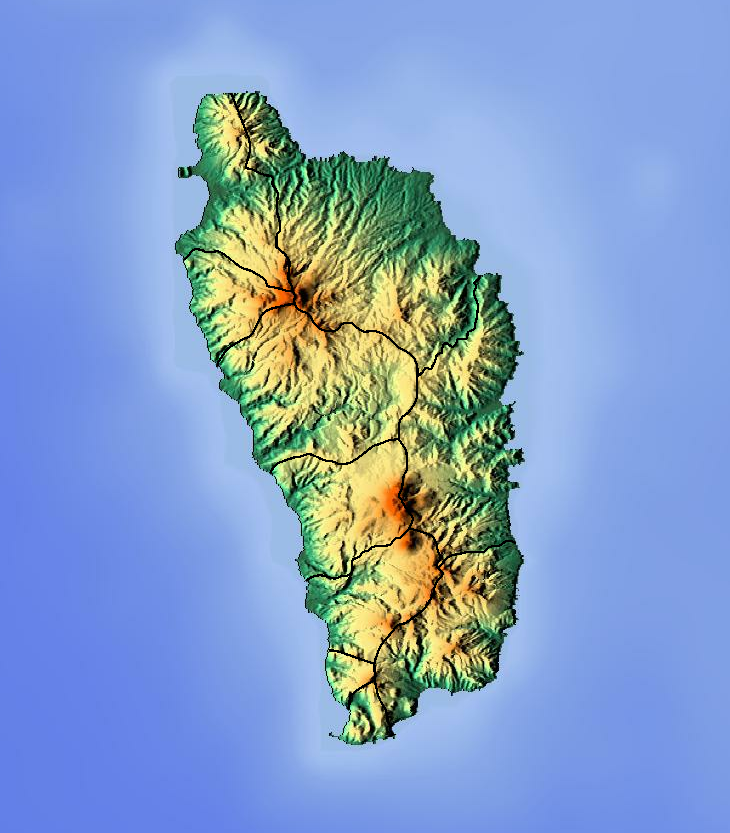
- Location of the mouth of the river

Location
- Country: Dominica

Physical characteristics
- Mouth: Caribbean Sea
  - coordinates: 15°23′N 61°26′W
- Length: 27.6 km (17.1 mi)
- Basin size: 74.3 km^{2} (28.7 sq mi)

The Layou River is a river in Dominica. It rises in the interior of the country, flowing westward to reach the Caribbean Sea on the country's central western coast, very close to the town of St. Joseph. It is the longest and deepest river in Dominica. With a total length of 27.6 km (17.1 mi) long.

== Disaster ==
The river is prone to flooding. Matthieu Dam, which is located near the end of the river, has collapsed multiple times. It started in the year 1997 when landslides, due to heavy rainfall blocked portions of the river. In the year 2011, the river flooded twice, in July and October. This poses a major threat to the Layou village. There were no deaths, but it affected 13 dwellings.
