= List of trails in Dominica =

This is a list of trails in Dominica.

== Hiking trails ==
=== Hiking trails in Morne Trois Pitons National Park ===
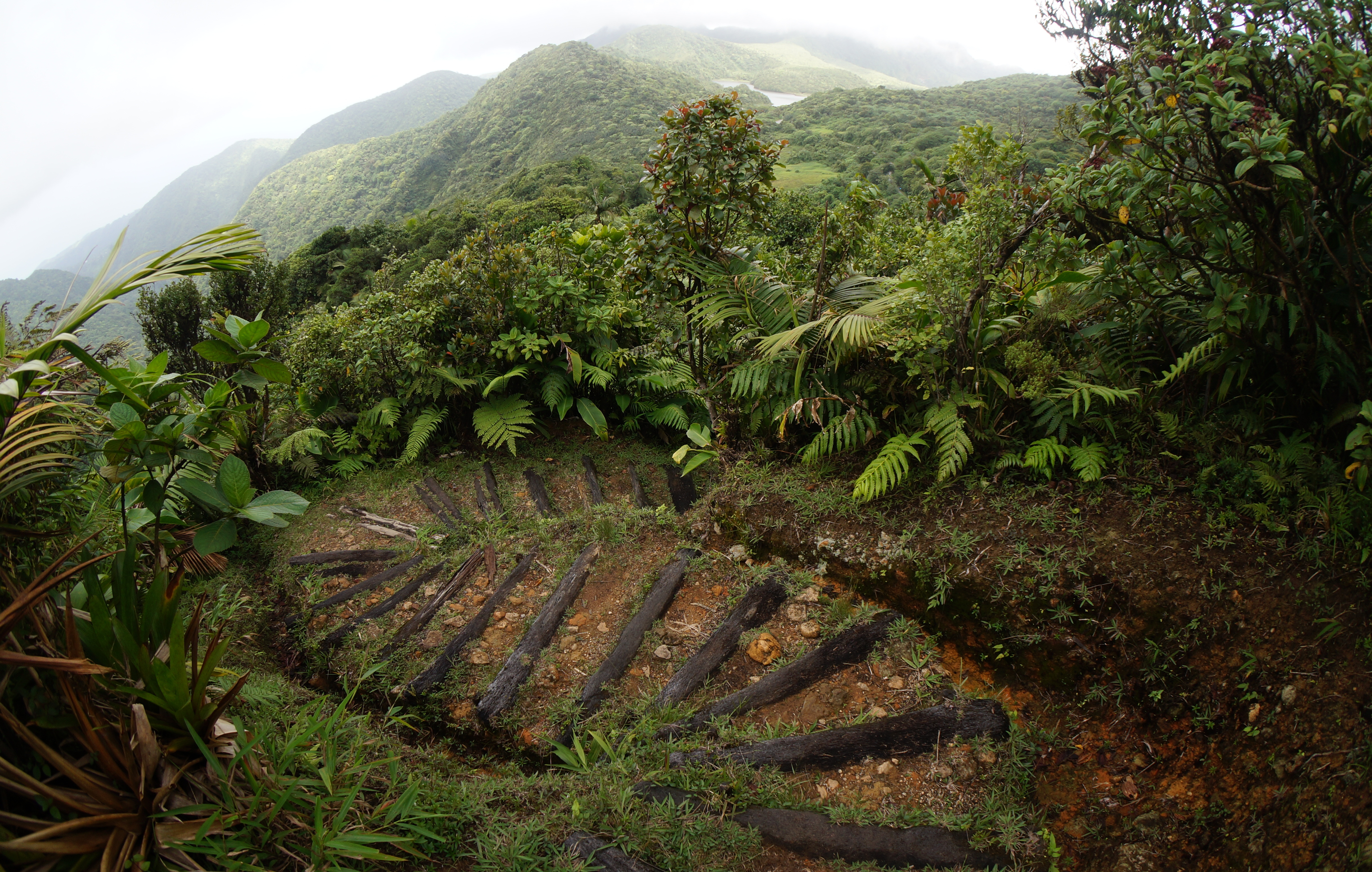
Hiking trail in Morne Trois Pitons National Park

Trail name	Associated landmark or geological formation	Length in miles (km)	Refs
Boiling Lake Trail	Boiling Lake	8 miles (12.9 km)	,
Emerald Pool Nature Trail	Emerald Pool	<1 mile (<1.6 km)	,
Freshwater Lake to Boeri Lake	Freshwater Lake, Boeri Lake	4.2 miles (6.75 km)	,
Middleham Trail	Middleham Falls		
Perdu Temps Trail	Perdu Temps River	4.8 miles (7.7 km)	,
Titou Gorge Trail	Titou Gorge	2 miles (3.2 km)	,

=== Hiking trails in Morne Diablotin National Park ===
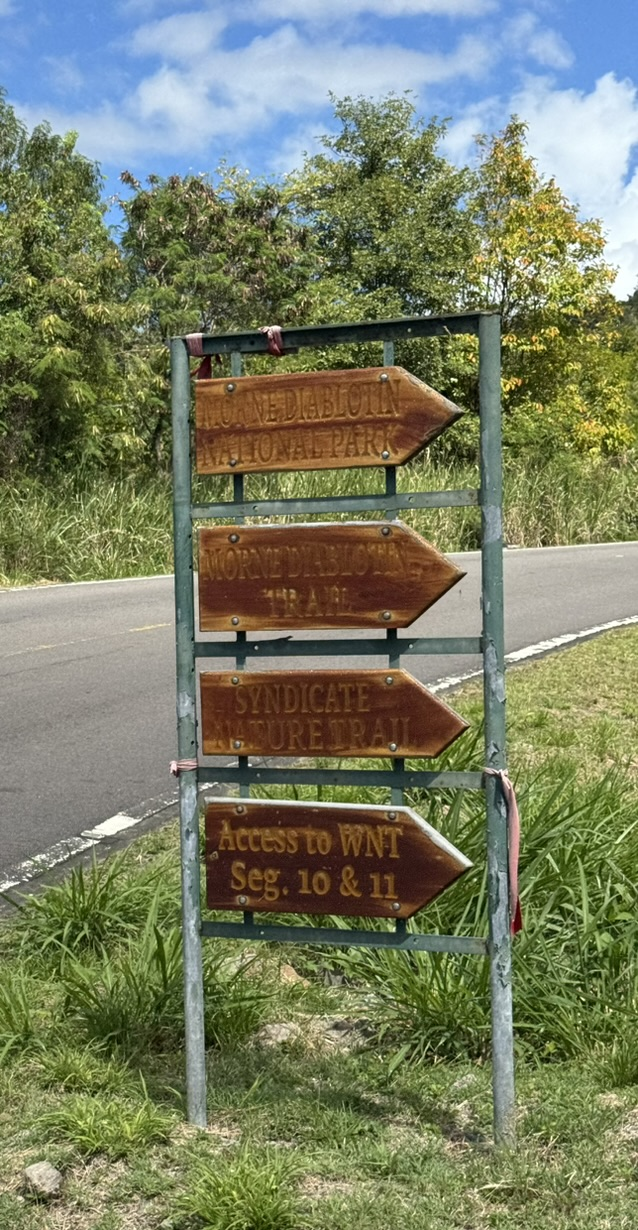
Road signs for Morne Diablotin National Park, hiking trails, and Waitukubuli National Trail access (Dominica)

Trail name	Associated landmark or geological formation	Length in miles (km)	Refs
Morne Diablotin Ascent	Morne Diablotin	3.8 miles (6 km)	,
Syndicate Nature Trail	Syndicate Parrot Preserve	1 mile (1.6 km)	,

=== Additional hiking trails ===
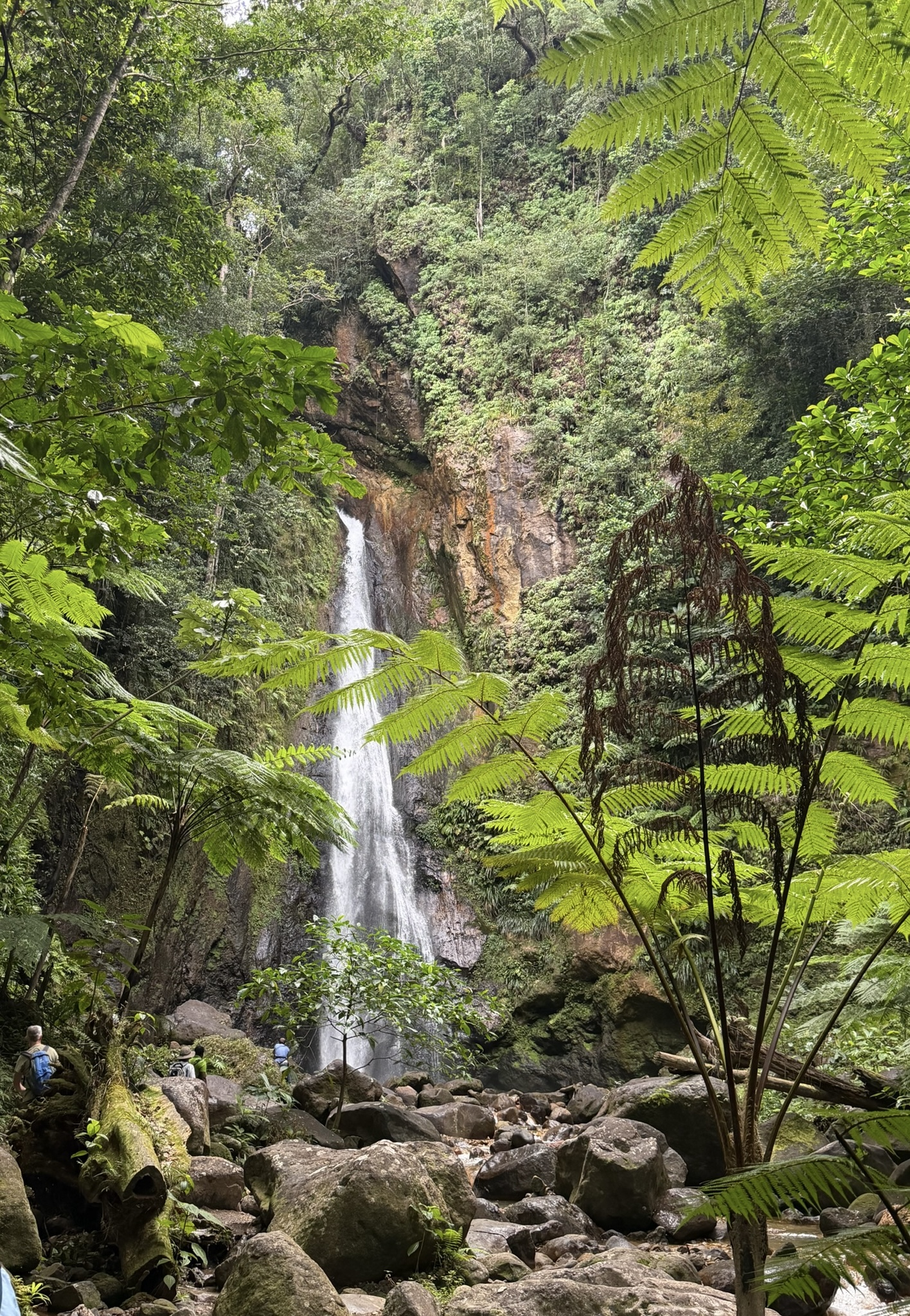
Milton (Syndicate) Falls

Trail name	Alternate name(s)	Location	Associated landmark(s)	Length in miles (km)	Refs
Glassé (Glassy) Trail	Glassé (Glassy) Point Trail, Glassé (Glassy) Pool Trail	Boetica	Glassy Pool	1.5 miles (2.4 km)	,
Jaco Steps	Jacko Steps, Jaco Flats	Belles	Jaco Steps	1 mile (1.6 km)	,
Spanny Falls	Spanny's Falls, Penrice Falls	Marigot	Spanny (Penrice) Falls	<1 mile (<1.6 km)	,
Jack's Walk		Roseau	Dominica Botanical Gardens, Morne Bruce	<1 mile (<1.6 km)	,
Milton Falls Trail	Syndicate Falls Trail	Syndicate	Milton (Syndicate) Falls	1.4 miles (2.3 km)	,
Titou Gorge Trail	Titou Gorge Canyoning Trail	Laudat	Titou Gorge	2 miles (3.2 km)	,
Trafalgar Falls		Trafalgar	Roseau Valley, Trafalgar Falls	<1 mile (<1.6 km)	,
Waitukubuli National Trail	WNT	long-distance trail	Fort Cachacrou, Morne Bruce, Pont Cassé, Fort Shirley	115 miles (185 km)	,
Wavine Cyrique Falls Trail	Wavine Cyrique Trail, Wavine Cyrique Cliff Trail	Rosalie	Wavine Cyrique Falls		,

== Kayaking trails ==
Name	Location	Length	Refs
Waitukubuli Sea Trail	western coast of Dominica	40 miles (64 km)	,
