= Cabrits National Park =

National park in Dominica

- IUCN category II (national park)
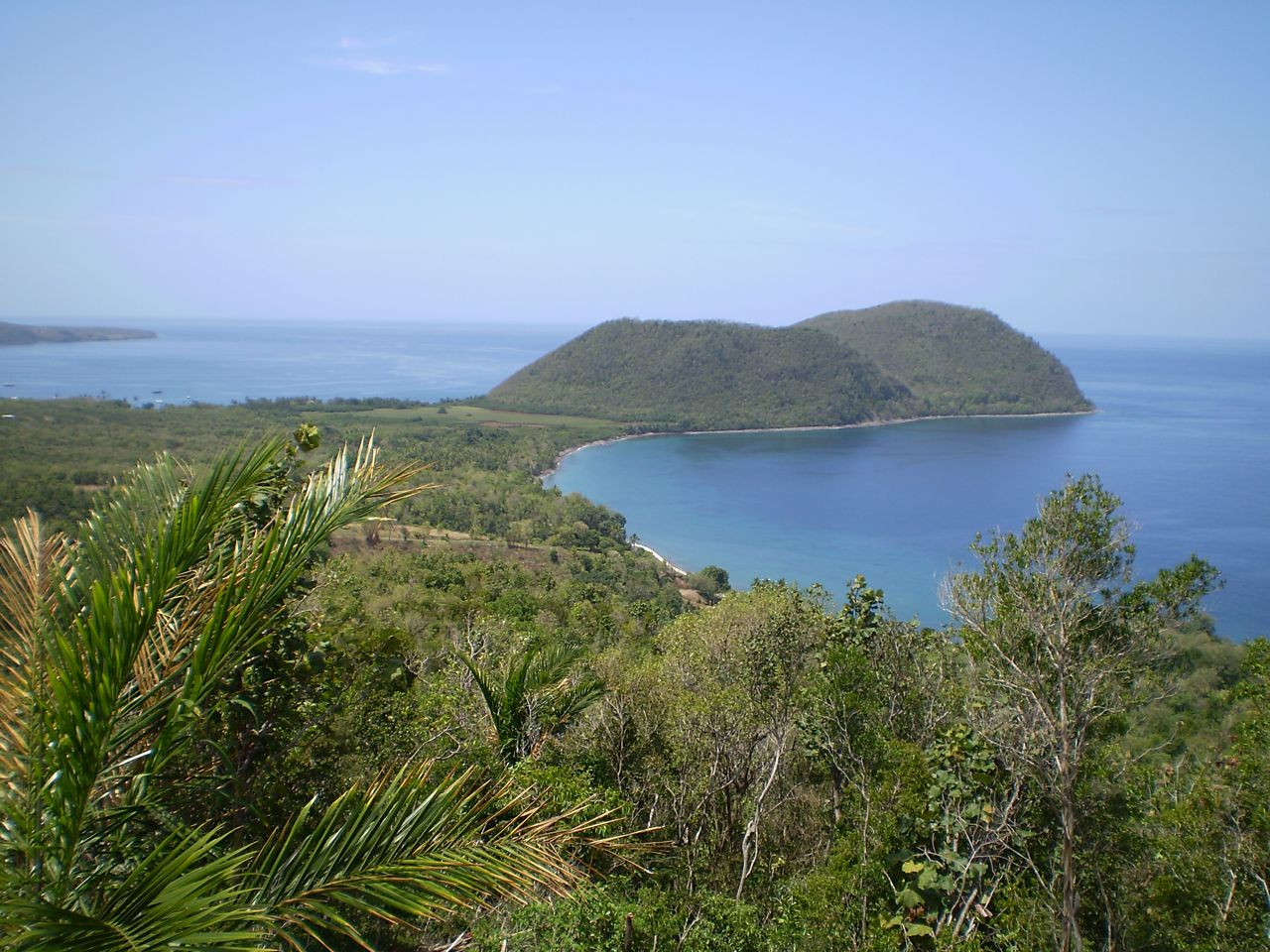
- Cabrits Peninsula

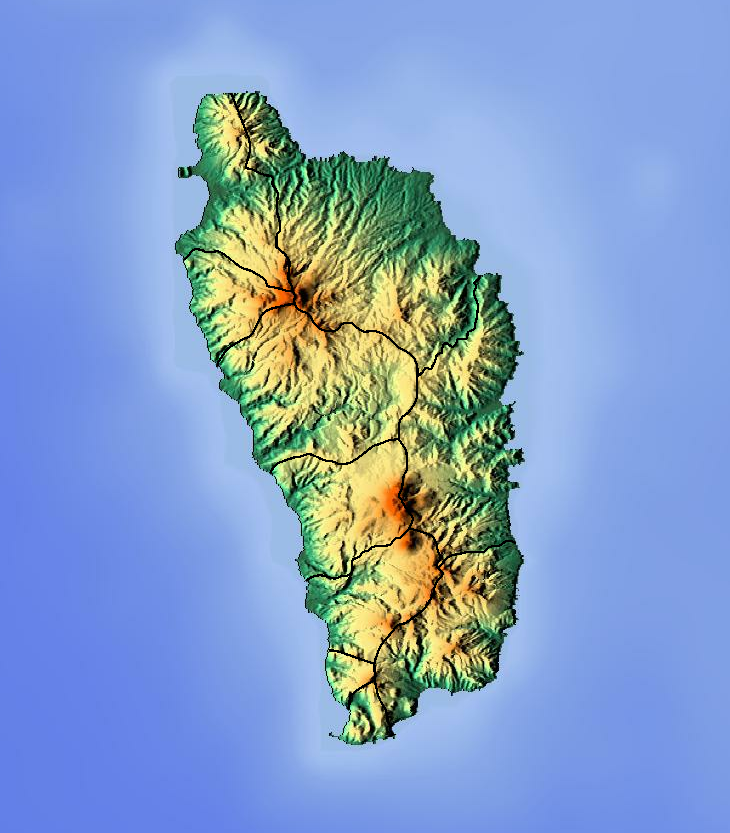
- Location within Dominica Location within the Caribbean
- Location: Dominica
- Nearest city: Portsmouth
- Coordinates: 15.58517°N 61.47017°W
- Area: 1,313 acres (531 ha)
- Established: 1986
- Website: Official website

Cabrits National Park is on a peninsula at the north end of the Caribbean island of Dominica, north of Portsmouth. The park protects tropical forest, coral reefs and wetlands. There are hiking trails and an English garrison called Fort Shirley.

== Overview ==
Cabrits National Park was established in 1986, and covers an area of 1,313 acres (5.30 km sq).

The park has two purposes:

- to protect Fort Shirley's cultural heritage and historical; and
- to conserve the surrounding environment, including coral reefs and forests.

The park also protects a marine area of 421 ha, located between Prince Rupert Bay and Toucar Bay.

== Geography ==
Located north of the town of Portsmouth, the land of Cabrits National Park is an extinct volcano that was once its own island, separate from mainland Dominica. It was connected to Dominica by the sweeping in of material from Douglas Bay and Prince Rupert Bay.

The park's two peaks – East Cabrit (140 m) and West Cabrit (171 m) – were formed by a volcano, formerly called Morne au Diable (or Morne aux Diables), around 1 million years ago.

== Etymology ==
'Cabrits' is the French word for 'goats'. Cabrits National Park is located on the Cabrits Peninsula, which was named in reference to the wild goats that roamed wild on the peninsula. Goats were introduced by sailors, who set them free on the island so that there would be meat available when they returned.

== Fort Shirley ==
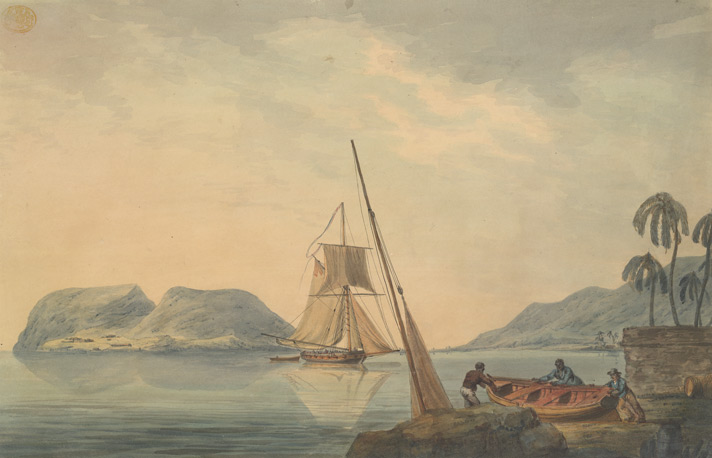
Prince Rupert's Head, (Fort Shirley) and Bay from near Cathcart's Tomb in 1780.

Fort Shirley was formerly a military outpost, a sterling example of its kind in the West Indies. The British began building it in 1765, on the order of Governor Thomas Shirley, as a garrison to defend north Dominica. The fort was extended by the French during their occupation of Dominica from 1778 to 1784. Georgian in style, the outpost consisted of over 50 buildings and housed over 600 men.

The site is famous for having sheltered the revolt of the 8th West India Regiment of African slave soldiers in 1802, an event which will contribute to the liberation of all slave soldiers on the island in 1807. It was abandoned in 1854. After deteriorating for years, Dr. Lennox Honychurch began restoration in 1982. Several of the buildings are completely restored, while ruins of the rest can be found scattered around the peninsula.

== Wildlife ==
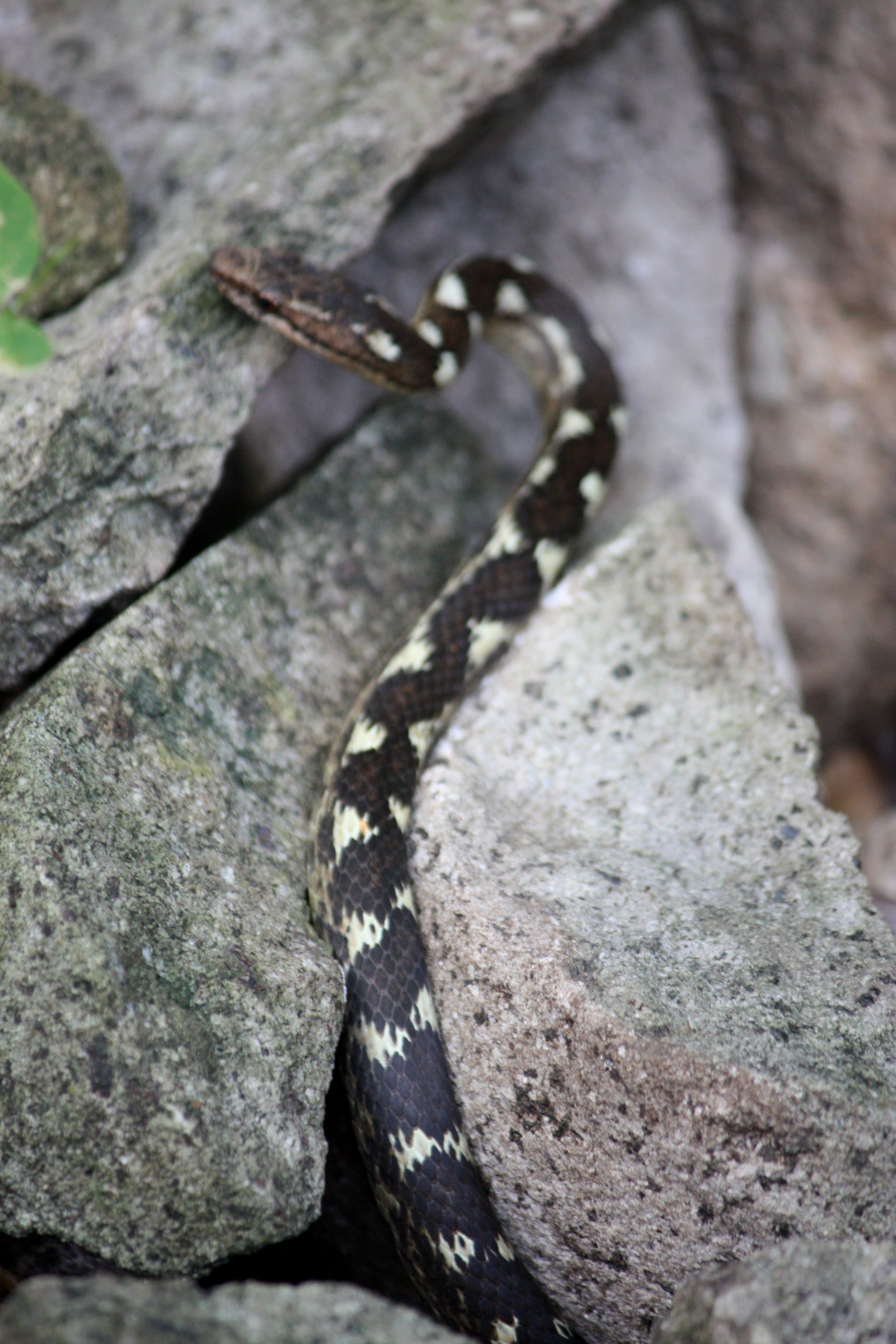
Antilles Racer (Alsophis antillensis) in the Cabrits National Park

The park is home to two species of amphibians, 162 species of birds, 18 species of mammals (including 5 introduced), 20 species of crabs, and at least 2 species of scorpions.

== Plants ==
The Cabrits National Park has wetlands, dry areas, tropical forest, and coral reefs; and within the wetlands, there are three main ecotypes: mangroves, swamp forest, and marshlands.

Two types of vegetation populate the park: dry forest and scrub on the mountains (receiving little precipitation) with deciduous species; and wetland, made up of marshes and swamps over 35 ha, which is one of the two largest in the Portsmouth area.

Three trees are endemic to the park: Annona glabra (Kachiman kochon), Pterocarpus officinalis (medal mangrove), and Laguncularia racemosa (white mangrove).

The coastal fringe of the park is populated by coconuts, mancellin trees, sea grapes, catalpas, almond trees, ficus, and acomat boucan. A small forest plantation was established in the 1960s, which introduced hibiscus, mahogany, teak, Caribbean pine, and pink poui.

More than 30 herbs and shrubs endemic to Cabrits National Park are recognized as medicinal or used for Dominican crafts.

== Tourism ==
Since the 2010s, the island, the city of Portsmouth and the Cabrits National Park in particular have been developing their tourist infrastructure.

In 2018, a scuba diving center opened its doors within the National Park.

=== Hiking ===
Cabrits National Park is the last stop on the Waitukubuli Trail which originates in the southern village of Scott's Head. Segment 14 of the trail runs from Capuchin to Cabrits. A path goes up to the fort and provides access to the two summits (East Cabrit and West Cabrit).

== See also ==
- List of trails in Dominica
- List of national parks of Dominica
- History of Dominica
