= Scotts Head Lighthouse =

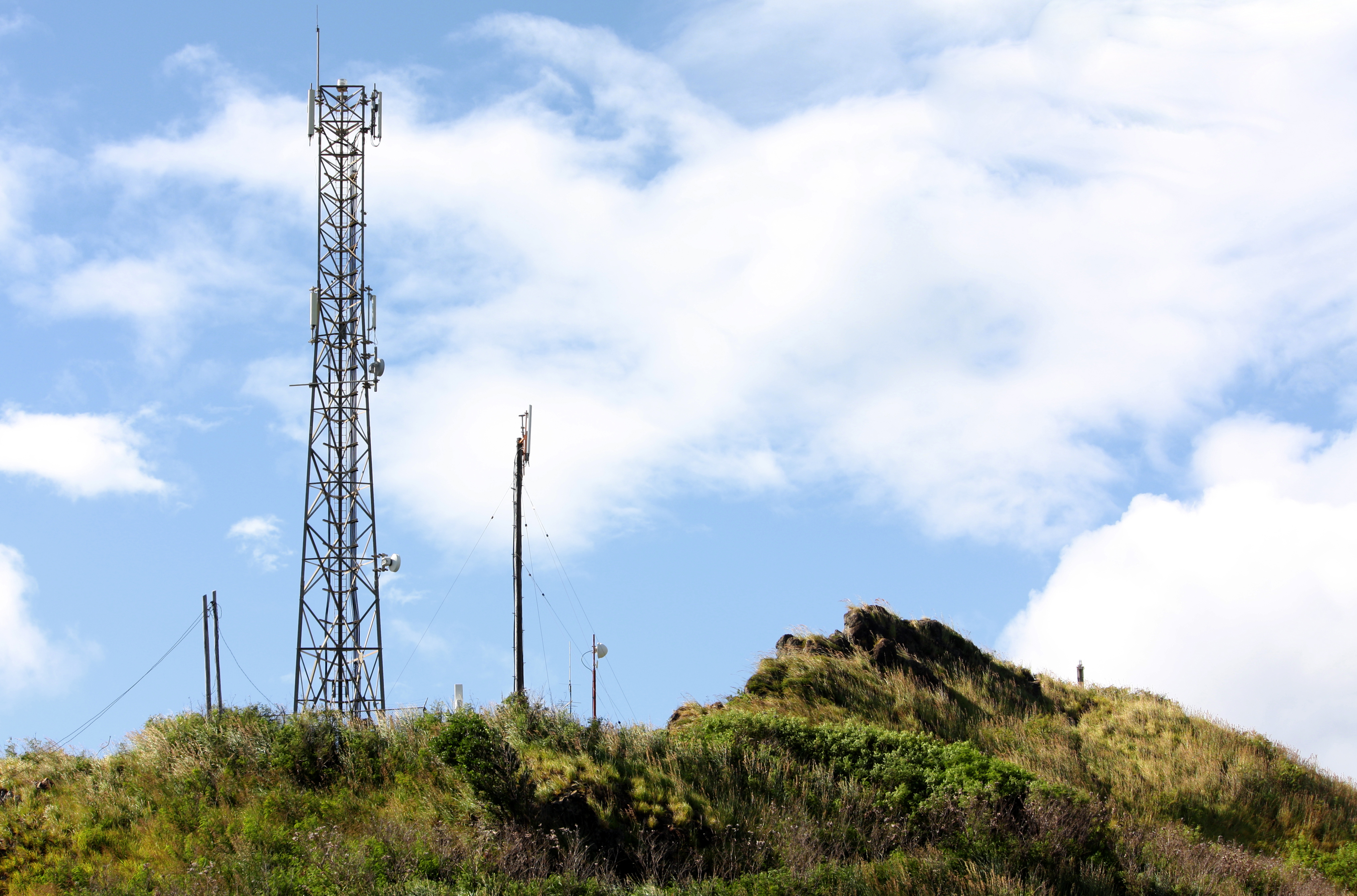
- The lighthouse is the first from right.
- Location: Scotts Head, Saint Mark Parish, Dominica
- Coordinates: 15°12′55″N 61°22′22″W

Tower
- Foundation: concrete base
- Construction: metal post
- Height: 5 m (16 ft)
- Shape: cylindrical post with light
- Markings: white lower half, black upper half
- Power source: solar power

Light
- Range: 17 nmi (31 km; 20 mi)
- Characteristic: Q W

Scotts Head Lighthouse is a small lighted navigational aid in Scott's Head, Dominica. It is a cylindrical metal post approximately 5 meters (16.4 ft) tall, with the lamp at the top of the post. It emits a quick-flashing white (Q.W.) light.

It is located at the top of the Scotts Head peninsula (or Cachacrou peninsula), in southwestern Dominica. The peninsula is considered a tied island, due to its being connected to the mainland by a tombolo.

== See also ==
- List of lighthouses in Dominica
