= Syndicate Nature Trail =

Hiking trail in Dominica

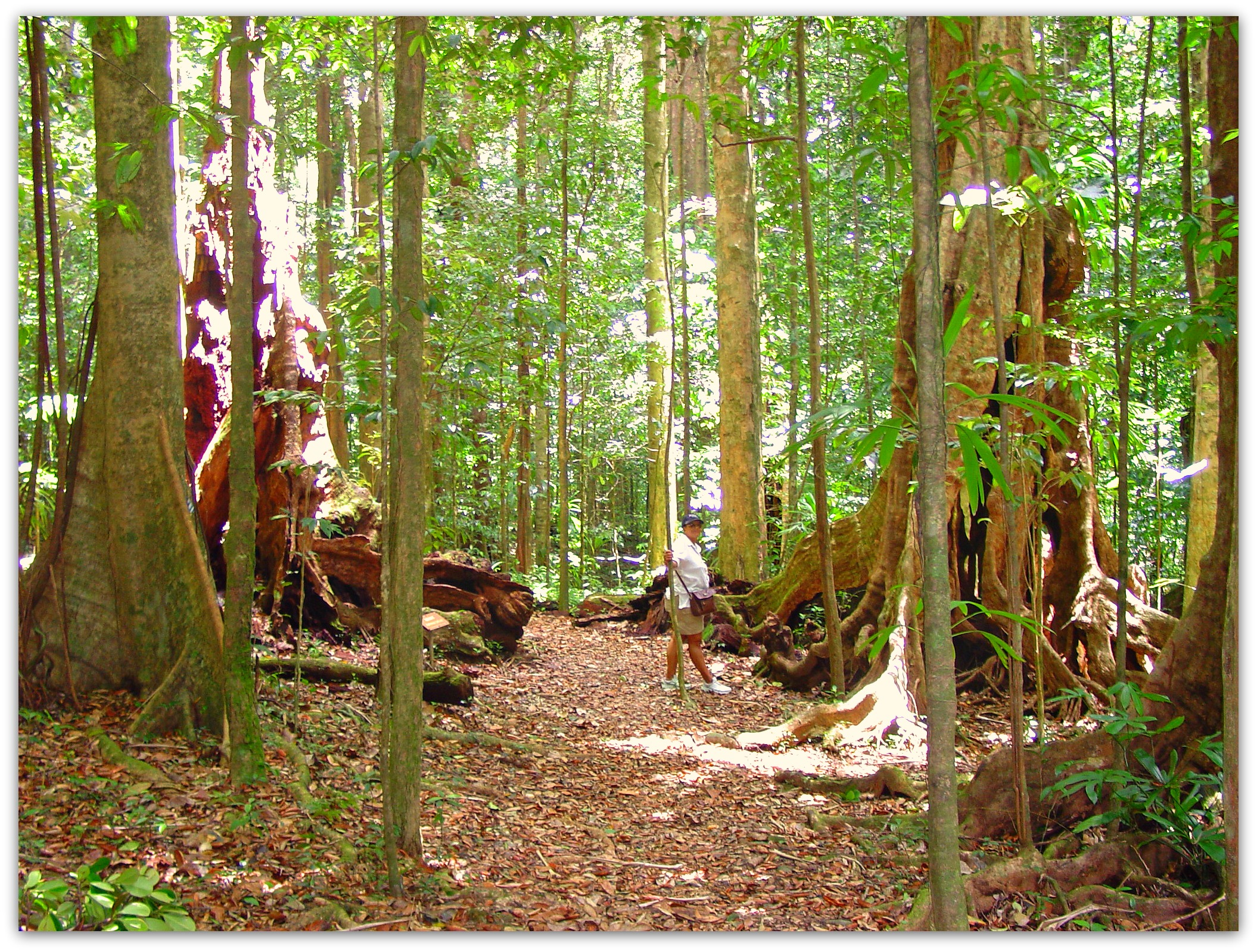
- Length: 0.9 mi (1.4 km) in 2026
- Location: Dominica
- Designation: Syndicate Nature Trail
- Trailheads: Syndicate Visitor Centre, Waitukubuli Trail
- Use: Hiking, Birding
- Difficulty: Easy
- Season: Year-round
- Website: https://forestry.gov.dm/sites/33-syndicate-nature-trail

The Syndicate Nature Trail (or the Visitor Centre Nature Trail) is a hiking trail in Dominica. It is one of two nature trails in Morne Diablotin National Park. It is located in the foothills of Morne Diablotin, near the edge of the Picard River Gorge. The entrance to the trail is at the Syndicate Visitor Centre. The trail is also accessible via the Waitukubuli National Trail. The trail is a loop of approximately 1 mile (1.6 km).

== History ==
The trail was constructed in 1993 by Dominica's Forestry, Wildlife, and Parks Division. It is located the on 205 acre (0.83 km^{2}) Syndicate Parrot Preserve (or "Syndicate Preserve"), most of which is forest or rainforest.

In September 2017, the trail was closed in after Hurricane Maria hit the island. The trail reopened in 2018, after the Forestry, Wildlife, and Parks Division worked with local and regional partners to clear the trail and other sites.

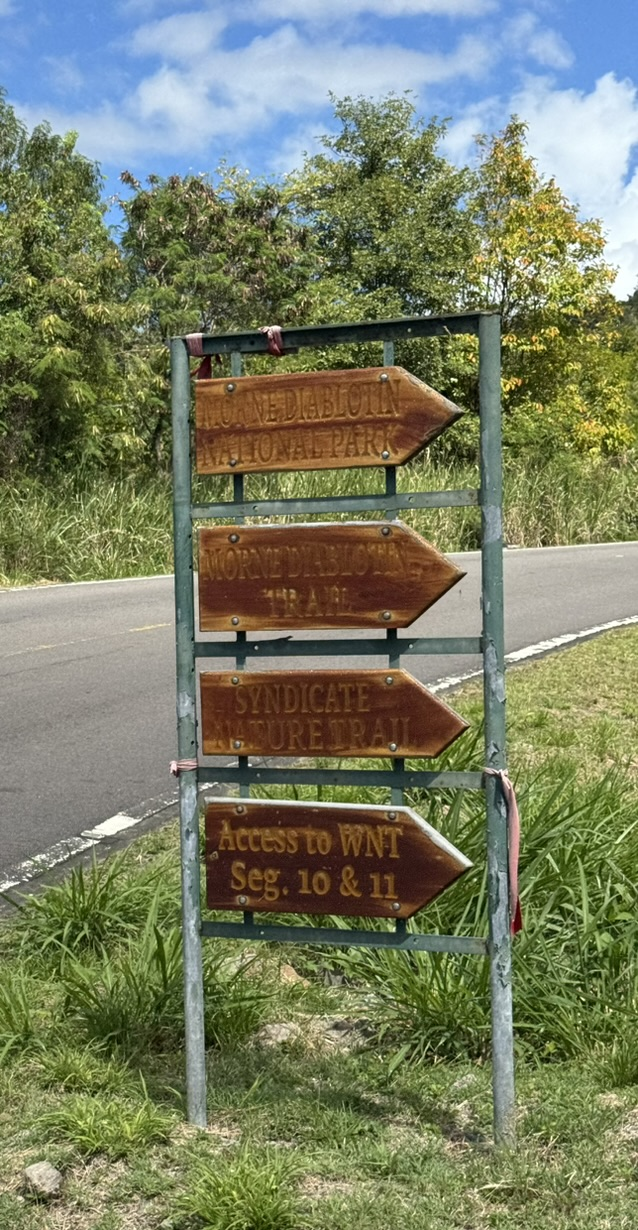
Road signs indicating direction to Syndicate Nature Trail and other trails

== Wildlife ==
The trail is popular with birdwatchers, as the preserve is home to the Sisserou Parrot (Amazona imperialis) and the Jaco Parrot (Amazona arausiaca), both of which are endemic to Dominica. The Sisserou Parrot is Dominica's national bird, and can be seen on Dominica's coat of arms. Other birds that can be found on the trail include the Bananaquit, Blue-headed Hummingbird, Broad-winged Hawk, Brown Trembler, Lesser Antillean Bullfinch, Plumbeous Warbler, Purplethroated Carib, Rufous-throated Solitaire, and Scaly-naped Pigeon.

== See also ==
- List of trails in Dominica
- List of national parks of Dominica
