= Morne Balvine =

Mountain in Dominica

Morne Balvine is a mountain located in Saint John, Dominica, on segment 11 of the Waitukubuli Trail. The estimate elevation is 404 feet above sea level.
