= Waitukubuli Trail =

Hiking trail on the island of Dominica

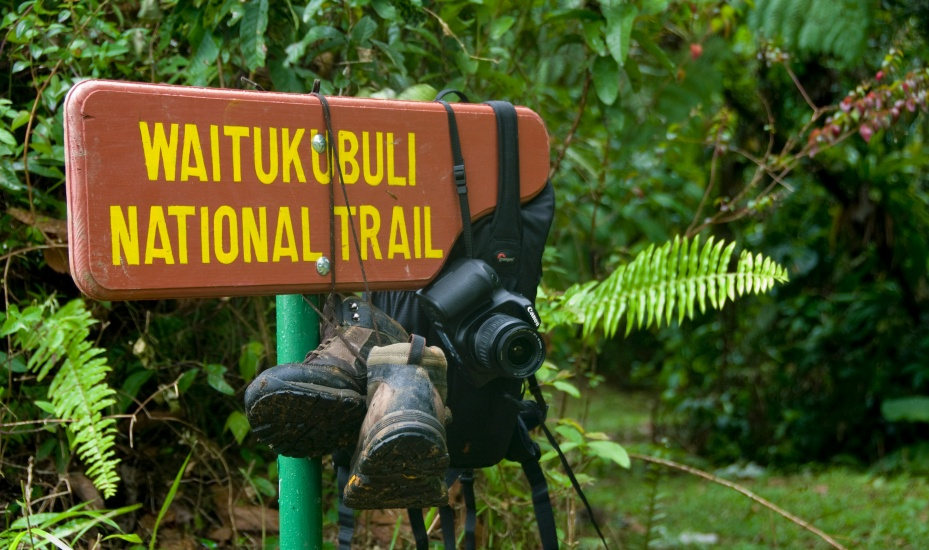
Waitukubuli National Trail sign

The Waitukubuli National Trail (or WNT) is a hiking trail spanning the island of Dominica. It is the longest hiking trail in the Caribbean, at 115 miles (185 km) long. Its name comes from the original Kalinago name of the island, Waitukubuli, meaning "tall is her body". Management of the trail falls under Dominica's Forestry Division.

== History ==
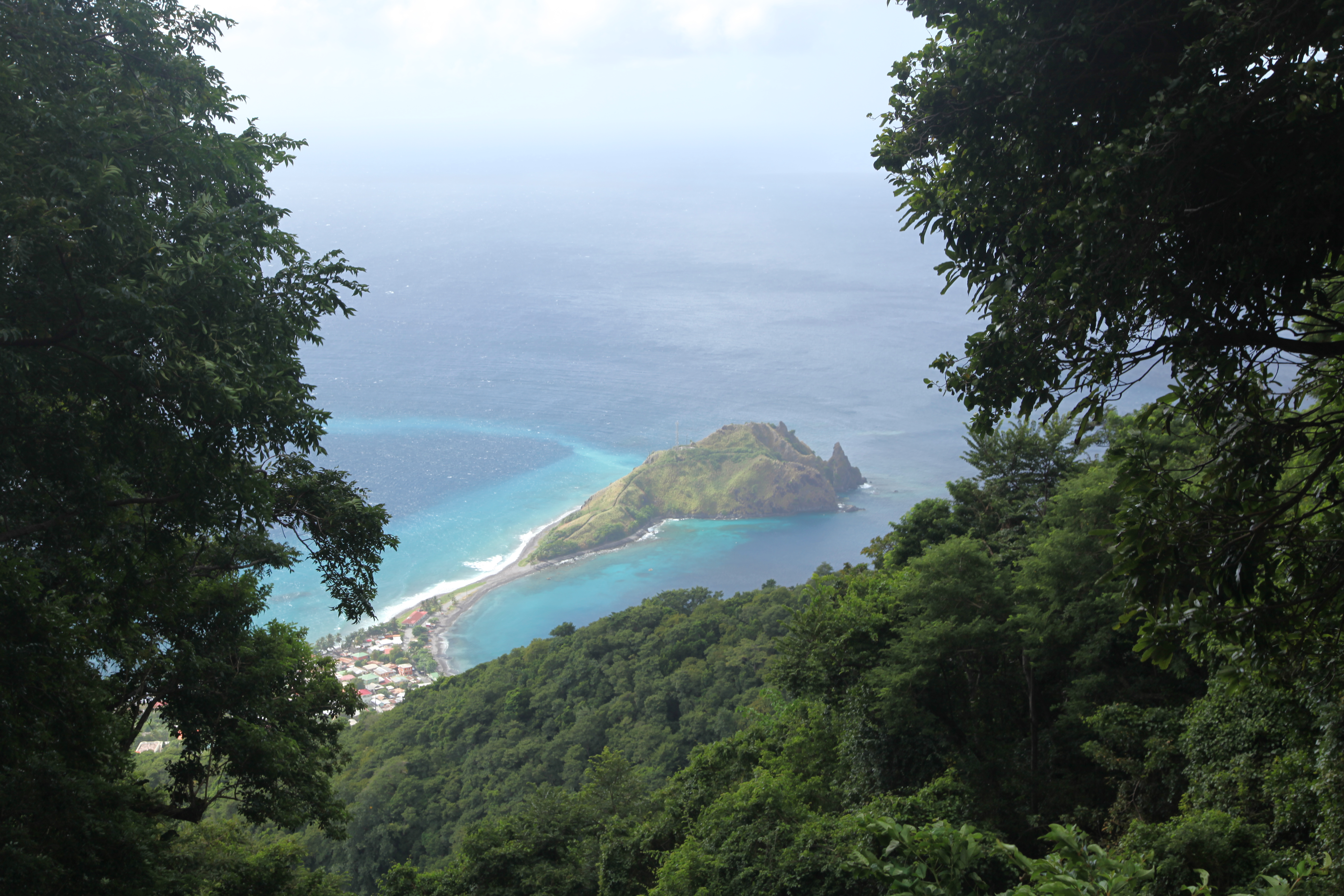
View of Scotts Head peninsula from the first segment of the trail

The trail was partially opened in 2011, and officially opened in 2013. As of July 2013, all visitors and non-residents need a paid trail pass to access the Waitukubuli National Trail.

== Trail segments ==
The entire trail is made of 14 segments, beginning in the southern village of Scott's Head, and ending in the north at Cabrits National Park.

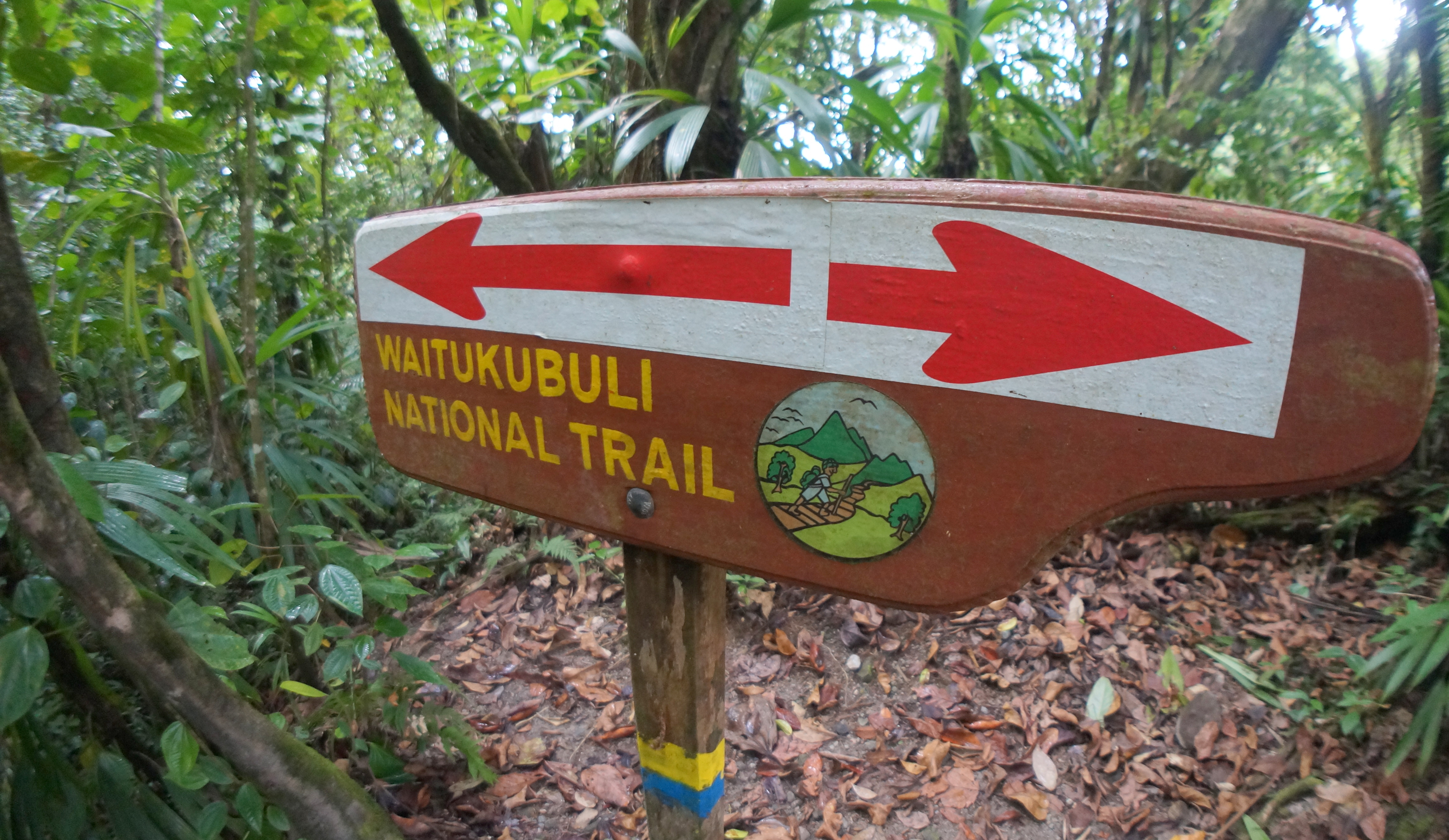
Signpost marking the Waitukubuli National Trail

It includes the following points:

- Scott's Head peninsula (location of Fort Cachacrou)
- Soufrière Estate
- Bellevue Chopin
- Wotten Waven
- Pont Cassé (location of the Waitukubuli Trail headquarters)
- Castle Bruce
- Hatton Garden
- First Camp
- Petite Macoucherie
- Colihaut Heights
- Syndicate (location of Syndicate Nature Trail, Syndicate Parrot Preserve)
- Borne (near Morne Balvine)
- Penville
- Capuchin
- Cabrits National Park (location of Fort Shirley)

In 2020, the trail was listed as one of National Geographic's "Top 10 North American Hikes of a Lifetime." In 2023, Lonely Planet named it one of the "Top 5 best hikes in the Caribbean".
