= List of lighthouses in Dominica =

There are three lighthouses in Dominica, an island country in the Caribbean Lesser Antilles.

== Lighthouses ==
Name (*)	Image	Year built	Location & coordinates	Class of Light	Focal height	NGA number	Admiralty number	Range nml
Morne Espagnol Lighthouse		n/a	Saint Peter Parish; 15°31′33.7″N 61°28′09.3″W	F RG	12 metres (39 ft)	14925	J5760.8	n/a
Salisbury Lighthouse	Image	n/a	Saint Joseph Parish; 15°26′37.9″N 61°26′59.0″W	F R	30 metres (98 ft)	14926	J5760.4	n/a
Scott Head Lighthouse	Image	n/a	Scotts Head; 15°12′54.6″N 61°22′21.7″W	Q W	n/a	14929	J5770	17

(*) NGA denomination

== See also ==
- Lists of lighthouses and lightvessels
