= Chief Jacko =

Dominican-African Maroon leader

Chief Jacko (also spelt as Jaco or Jacco) was an African-born slave-turned-Maroon chief in the Commonwealth of Dominica. Jacko would eventually become known as "the oldest chief", "supreme head" of the Maroons and, according to Governor Ainslie, called himself the "governor of the woods".

== History ==
Jacko is reported to have been born in the West African country of Guinea and was transported to and enslaved in Dominica in the late 1760s on Chevalier Beaubois' Beau Bois Estate in Castle Comfort. Jacko would escape the estate shortly afterward and proceed to establish a camp on a high natural plateau in the interior of the island near Belles. Jacko's camp, called "Jacko Flats" would become his base from where he led maroon raids on colonial estates and provided refuge for runaway slaves. Jacko's Grand Camp was one of the main targets of the British's offensive during the Second Maroon War that began in 1812 and after over 40 years of living in the forest, Jacko was killed during a surprise raid on 12 July 1814 by John LeVilloux.

== Legacy ==
=== Jacko Flats ===
Jacko (or Jaco) Flats, situated near the village of Belles, Dominica, is the name given to the plateaued area in Layou Valley where Chief Jacko's Grand Camp once was.

=== Jacko Steps ===
Jacko (or Jaco) Steps were manually constructed by the slaves who resided in Chief Jacko's camp. The 135 steps are about 3 feet tall and are cut into the existing rock of the mountain and serve as an alternative access or escape route to and from the Grand Camp. The hike is reportedly 45 minutes across one mile.

=== Neg Mawon Emancipation Monument ===
In 2013, a statue of Jacko was erected on a roundabout at the intersection of Victoria Street, Turkey Lane, and Castle Street in Roseau. It was built by Franklyn Zamore as part of the 175th anniversary of Dominica's emancipation of slavery. It stands as a symbol of the fight for freedom as well as resilience, strength and triumph that stands about five minutes walking distance from the Old Roseau Market, which signifies the punishment and execution endured by the enslaved.
