= Morne Diablotin National Park =

National park in Dominica

Coordinates: 15°30′N 61°24′W

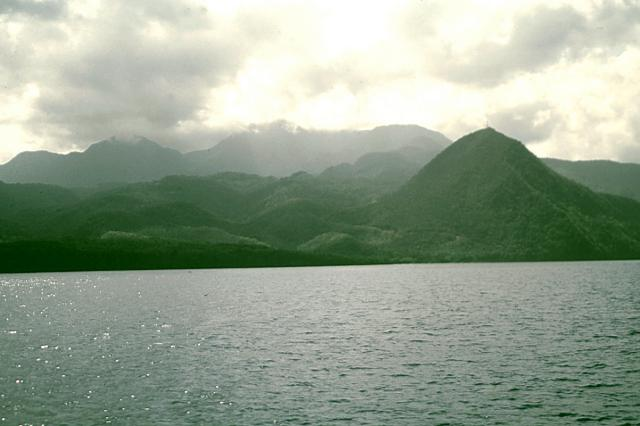
- Morne Diablotin, Dominica's tallest mountain and largest volcano, sits within the park.
- Area: 8,242 acres (33.35 km^{2})
- Elevation: 4,747 ft (1,447 m)
- Established: January 2000; 26 years ago
- Governing body: Forestry, Wildlife and Parks Division of Dominica

Morne Diablotin National Park is a national park in the northern mountain ranges of Dominica, an island nation in the Caribbean. The park is a habitat for many species of flora and fauna. It has multiple hiking trails, as well as streams and waterfalls.

== Geography ==
The park comprises 3,335.3 hectares (8,242 acres), amounting to 4.4% of the nation's area. It is home to 1,447-meter (4,747 ft) high Morne Diablotins, which is the tallest mountain on the island and the second highest mountain in the Lesser Antilles. The park also has many waterfalls.

== History ==
Before the arrival of the Europeans, the land area provided materials for the local indigenous population. During the 18th century, the land was home to at least six different encampments of escaped slaves.

The national park was established in January 2000, under Dominica's National Parks Act of 1975. It was created in partnership with the Rare Species Conservation Foundation (RSCF), to protect the habitat of the endangered Sisserou parrot (Dominica's national bird) and Jaco parrot. The park was created from combining land from the former Northern Forest Reserve, the Syndicate Parrot Preserve, and two inholdings situated in the Forest Reserve.

In 2007 the park was designated an Important Bird Area (IBA) by BirdLife International because it supports, breeding populations of several restricted-range bird species in addition to the Sisserou and Jaco parrots.

== Wildlife ==
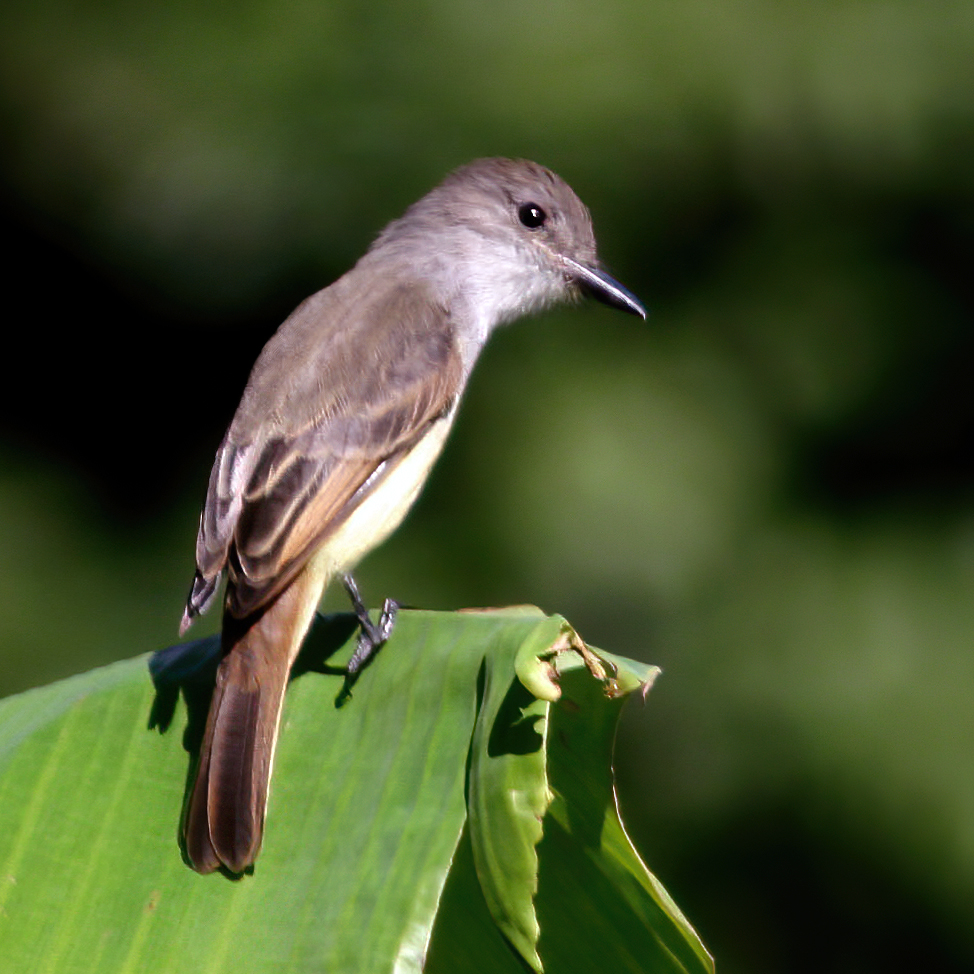
Lesser Antillean flycatcher in Morne Diablotin National Park

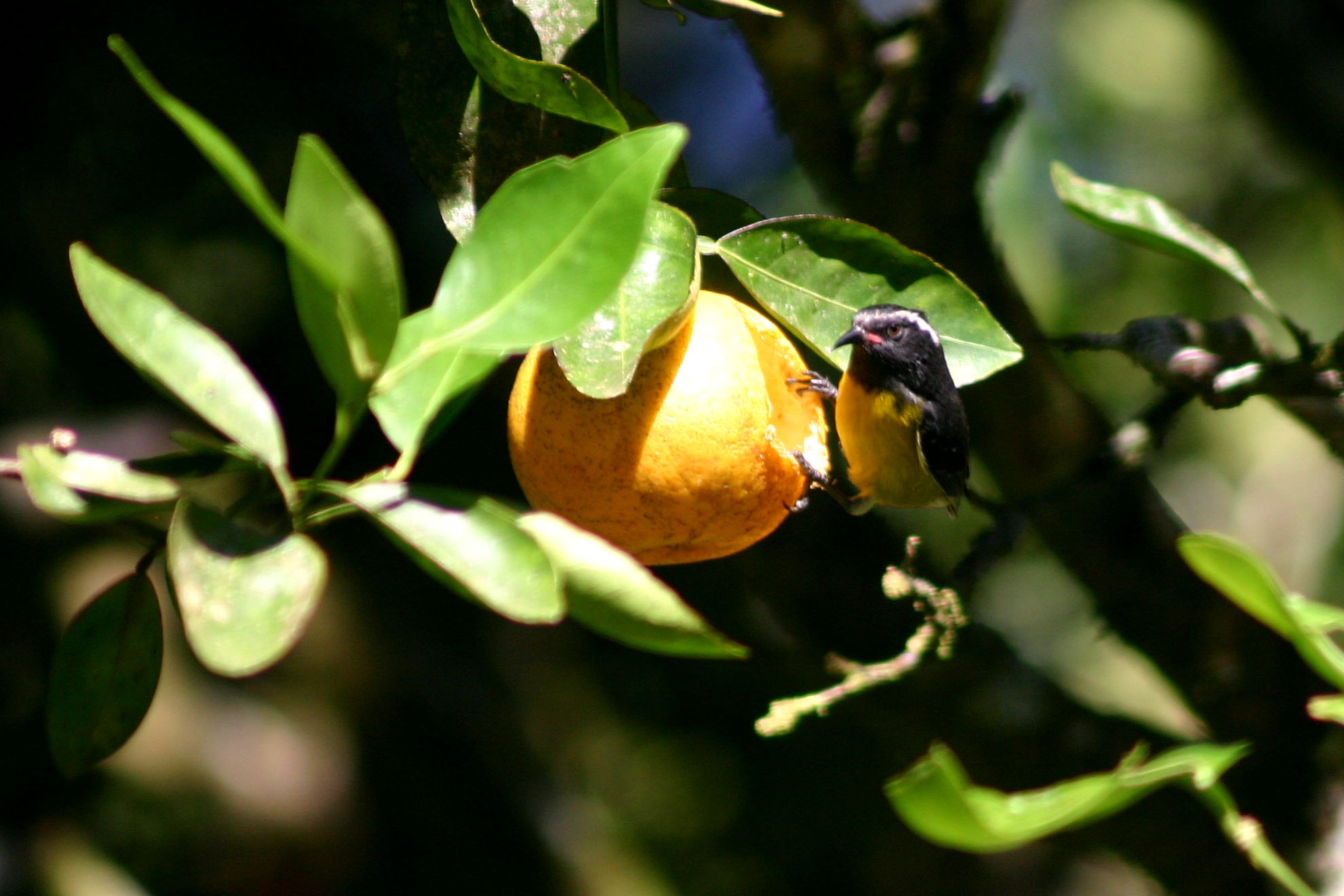
Bananaquit feeding on orange in Morne Diablotin National Park

The park is a habitat for over fifty species of birds, of which at least thirty species breed on the island. These birds include the endangered Sisserou parrot (Imperial amazon) and Jaco parrot (Amazona arausiaca), which are endemic to Dominica. Other birds include Lesser Antillean Flycatcher (Myiarchus oberi), Banaquit (Coereba flaveola), Black-throated blue warblers (Setophaga caerulescens), and Hooded warblers (Setophaga citrina).

Mammals in the park include the agouti (Dasyprocta leporine), the opossum (Didelphys marsupialis insularis), feral pigs (Sus scrofa), and at least eleven species of bats.

The park has two species of tree frogs: the endemic Eleutherodactylus amplinympha, locally called Gounouji; and Eleutherodactylus martinicensis, locally called Tink Frogs. The park's streams are home to several species of crustaceans and fresh water fish. There are many species of insects, including 24 species of butterflies.

The park is home to many lizards, including Lesser Antillean iguanas (Iguana delacatissima), tree lizards (Anolis oculatus), and pigmy geckos (Sphaerodactylus vincenti), as well as the boa constrictor (Constrictor constrictor nebulosis).

== Hiking ==
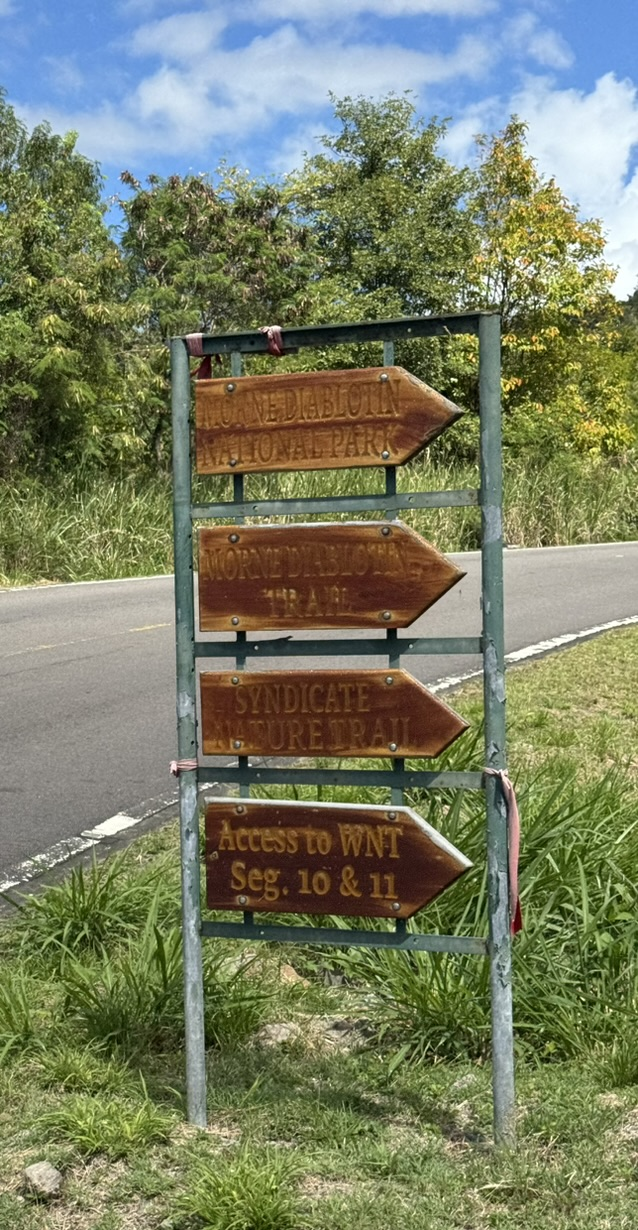
Signs for Morne Diablotin National Park and other hiking trails

The park has two hiking trails:

- Syndicate Nature Trail (or "Visitor Centre Nature Trail") – a 0.9 mile (1.4 km) loop, which takes 45-60 minutes.
- Morne Diablotin Ascent (or "Morne Diabloin Trail") – a 1.2 mile (2 km) trail that leads to the summit of Morne Diablotins, which takes 2-3 hours.

== See also ==
- List of trails in Dominica
- List of national parks of Dominica
