= Scotts Head, Dominica =

Village in Dominica

Coordinates: 15°12′45″N 061°22′00″W

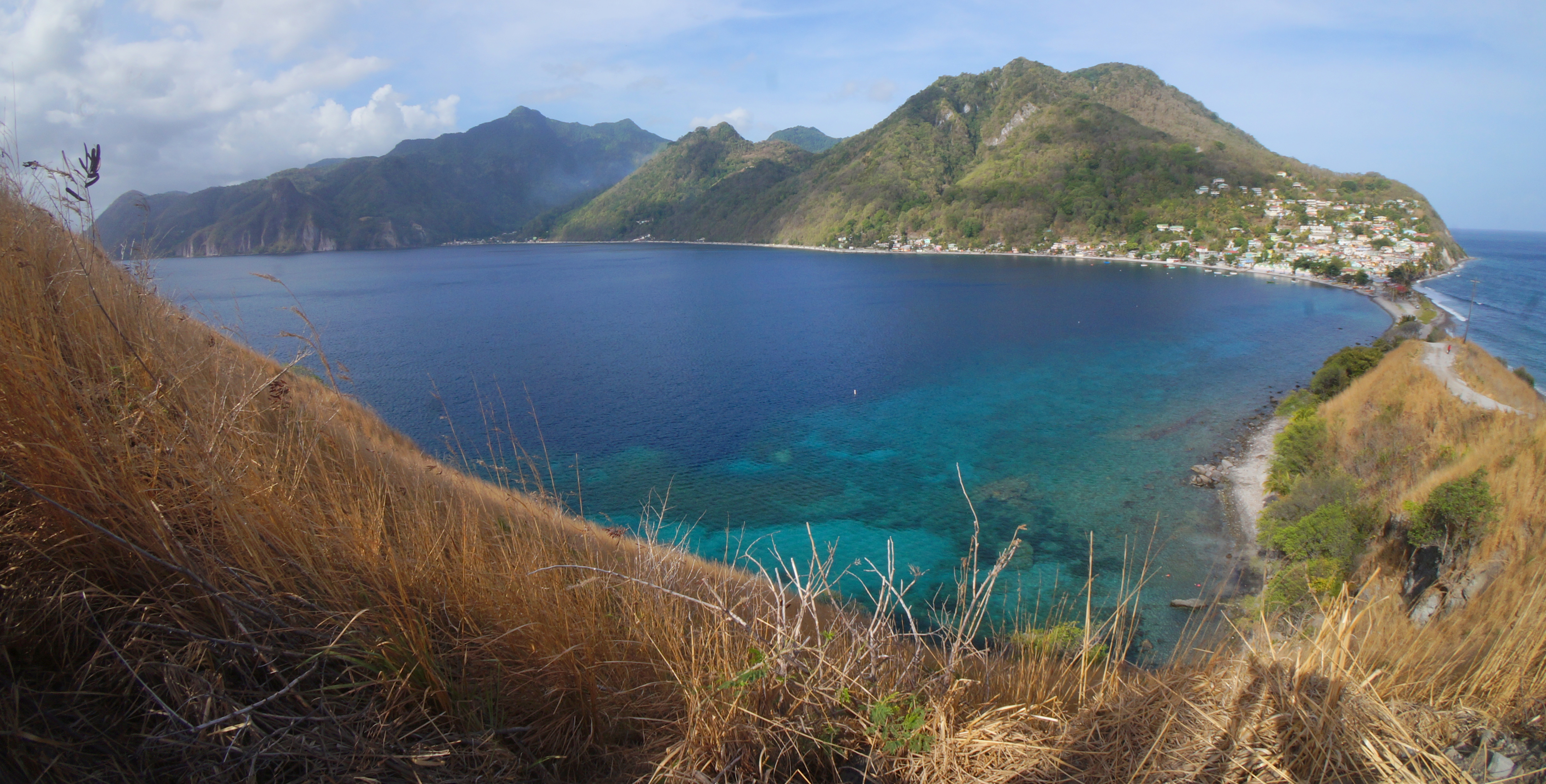
Scott's Head Village, taken from Scott's Head

Scotts Head is a village on the southwest coast of Dominica, in Saint Mark Parish. In 2001, its population was 721. Predominantly a fishing village, Scotts Head overlooks Soufrière Bay, which is protected as the Soufrière Scotts Head Marine Reserve. It is also a popular snorkelling and diving site for tourists.

The village shares its name with the Caribbean's only tied island, a small peninsula with a rising headland that extends westward from the village at Dominica's southwest tip. The Kalinago name of the peninsula is Cachacrou, literally "that which is being eaten (by the sea)"; this is possibly a reference to its location at the convergence of the Caribbean Sea to its north and the Atlantic Ocean to its south.

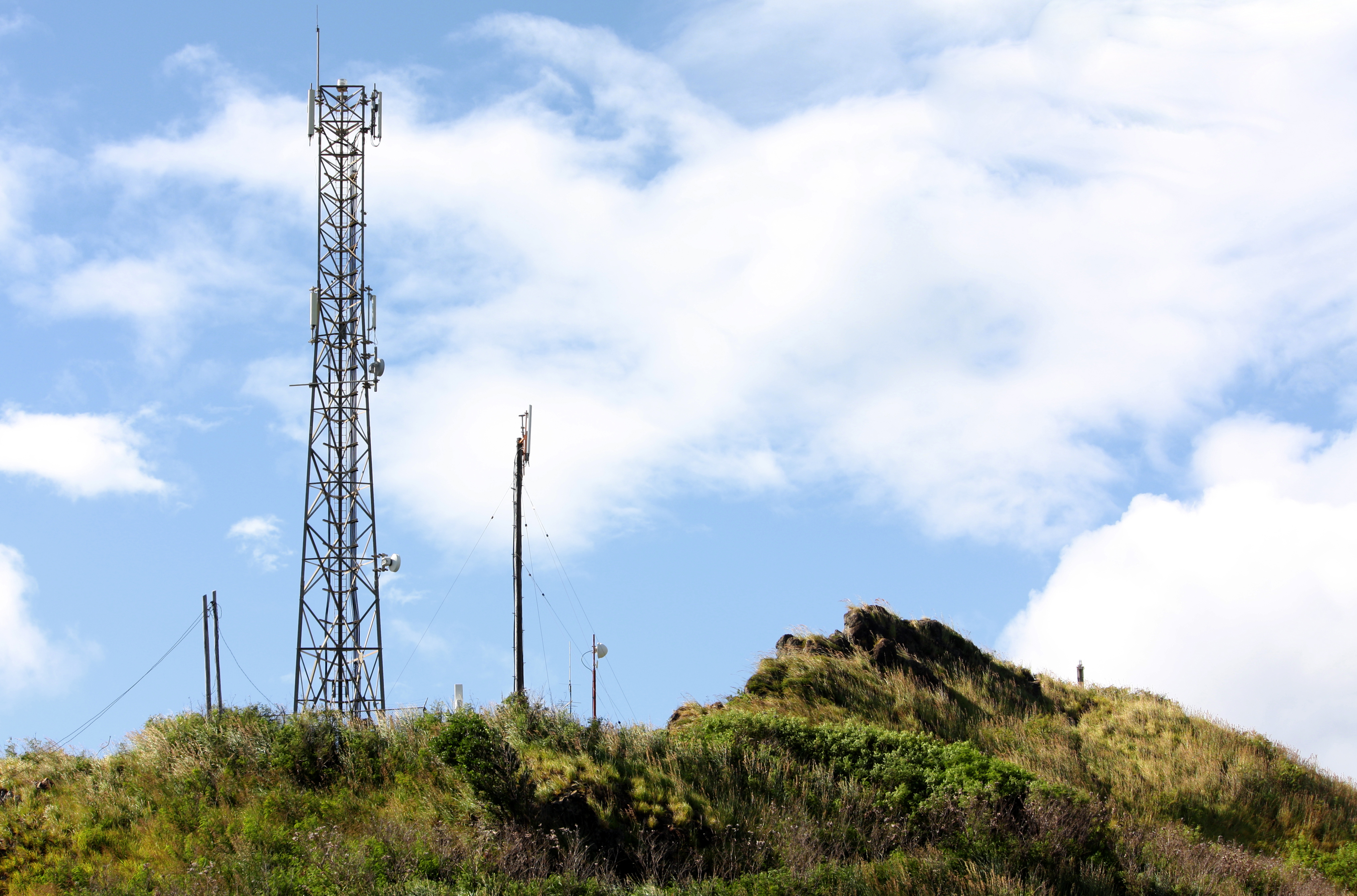
Top of the Scotts Head peninsula, with cable & wireless towers, and Scotts Head Lighthouse (farthest right)

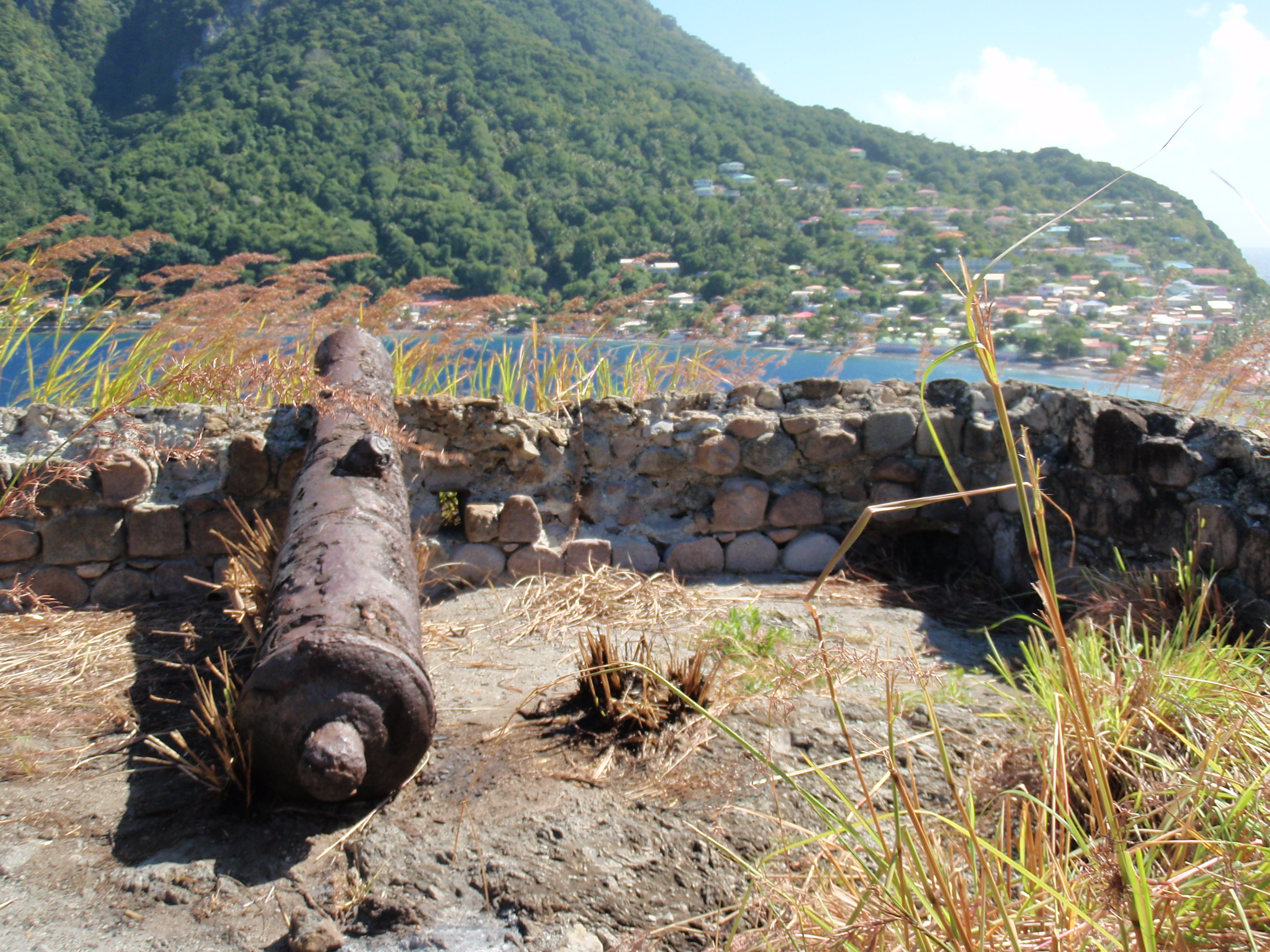
Fort Cachacrou ruins, overlooking Soufriere Bay

At the top of the peninsula is the Scotts Head Lighthouse, a small lighted navigational aid approximately 5 meters (16.4 ft) tall. Also on the peninsula are the remains of the 18th century military battery, Fort Cachacrou.

Each year, in June or July, the Scotts Head village holds an annual feast in honour of Saint Peter. The Scotts Head village also is host to Dive Fest, the Caribbean's longest-running diving festival. The festival includes scuba diving and freediving events, as well as food, entertainment, and competitions.

Scotts Head is the start of the first segment of the Waitukubuli National Trail, the longest hiking trail in the Caribbean at 115 miles (185 km) long. From Scott's head, hikers can hike 7 km (4.4 miles) to Soufrière Estate in about 4-6 hours. Additionally, Scotts Head is the start of the Waitukubuli Sea Trail, the first sea kayaking trail in the Caribbean.

== History ==
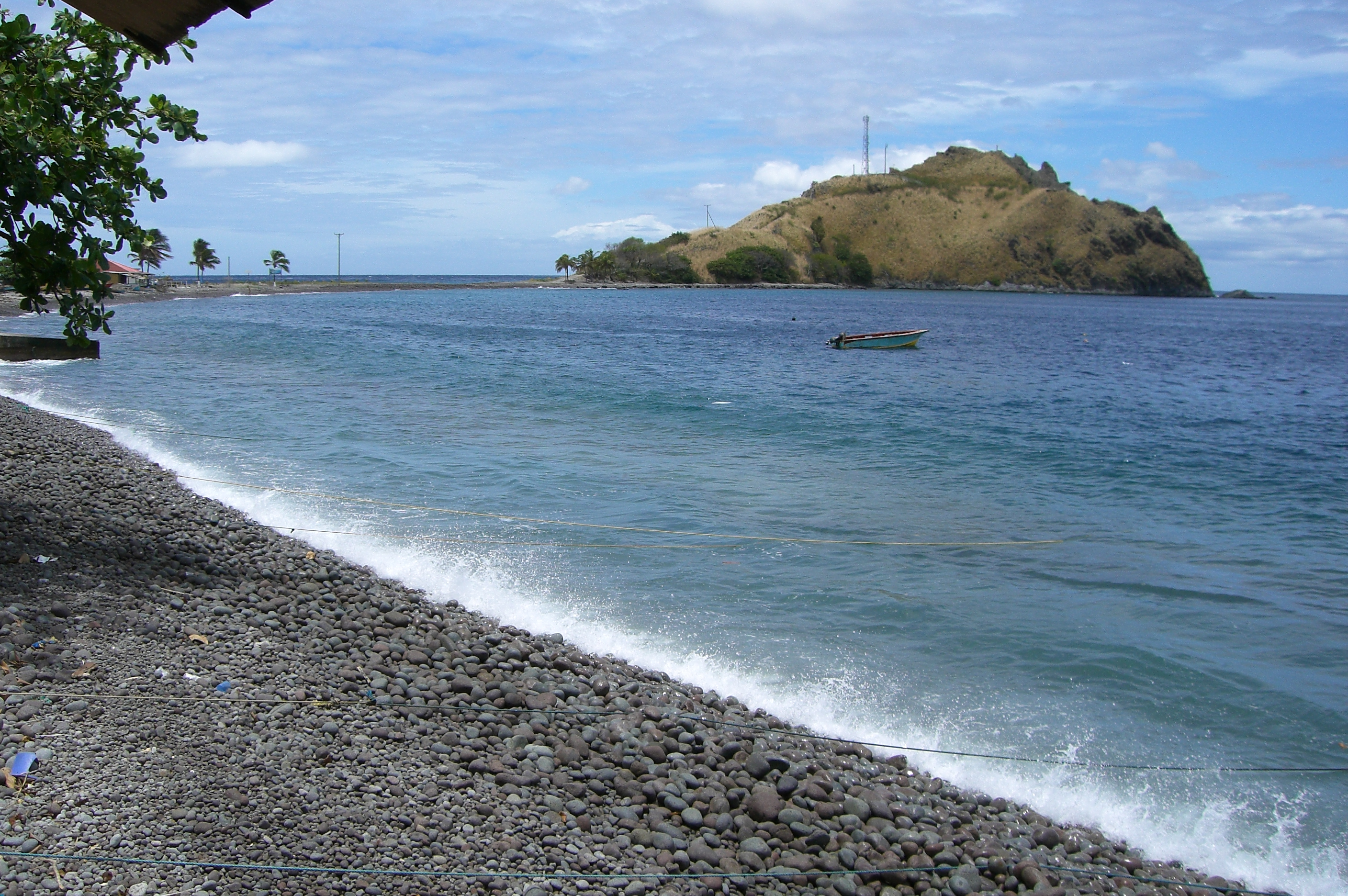
Scott's Head peninsula (Cachacrou) across Soufrière Bay, taken from Scott's Head Village

Scotts Head was originally called Cashacrou by the Kalinago people of Dominica. It was later renamed after Captain George Scott, who had served in the British invasion force that captured Dominica from the French in 1761 and then became lieutenant governor of Dominica from 1764 to 1767. Scott oversaw the construction of Fort Cachacrou on the headland of the Scotts Head peninsula; the bulk of this fortification has collapsed down the cliff into the water, though some ruins remain, including a small cannon.

When the French retook Dominica in 1778 (only to hand it back in 1783 as a concession in the Treaty of Versailles), the fort at Scotts Head was the first invasion point and the site of the first skirmish. In anticipation of the invasion, French inhabitants of Dominica visited British troops at the fort on 6 September, getting them drunk and then spiking the cannons with sand. French fleets sailed between three and four o'clock on 7 September from Martinique, the French-controlled island directly to Dominica's south. When the French stormed the fort in the morning, the British were taken by surprise. Once the fort was captured, the French fired a celebration signal, which was the first notice of the invasion the British had in the capital of Roseau to the north.
