= List of national parks of Dominica =

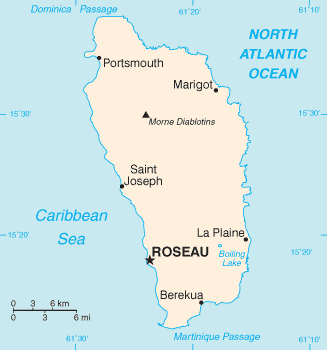
Map of Dominica

This list is of national parks in Dominica. For national parks in the similarly named country of the Dominican Republic, see List of national parks of the Dominican Republic.

There are three National parks in Dominica. Other protected areas include two Forest Reserves and the Syndicate Parrot Preserve.

== National parks ==
National park	Area	Established	Notes
Cabrits National Park	1,313 acres (531 ha)	1986	
Morne Diablotin National Park	8,242 acres (3,336 ha)	January 2000	
Morne Trois Pitons National Park	17,000 acres (6,879.8 ha)	1975	Declared a UNESCO World Heritage Site in 1998.

== Other protected areas ==
Protected area	Area	Established	Notes
Central Forest Reserve	1,013 acres (410 ha)		
Northern Forest Reserve	13,531 acres (5,476.9 ha)		
Soufrière Scotts Head Marine Reserve			
Syndicate Parrot Preserve	204 acres (81 ha).		

=== Proposed protected areas ===
A 300 sq. mi. (800 km^{2}) protected marine reserve has been announced to protect sperm whales, the first in the world.
