= Fort Shirley (Dominica) =

Historic military outpost on the island of Dominica

- Cabrits National Park, Dominica
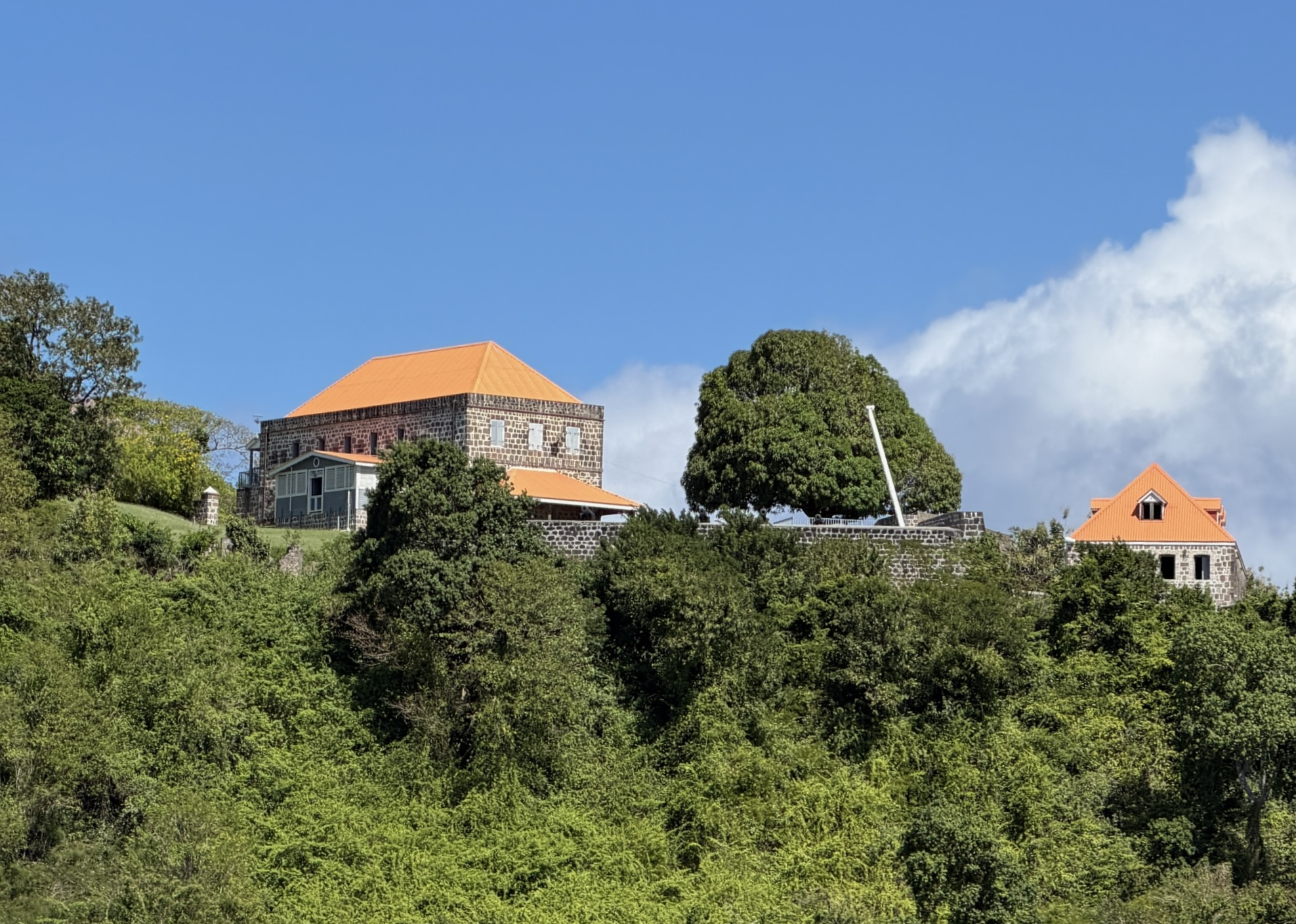
- Mountain top view of Fort Shirley

Site information
- Type: Fortification

Location
- Location in Caribbean Fort Shirley (the Caribbean)
- Coordinates: 15.5834°N 61.4735°W

Site history
- Built: 1765
- In use: No
- Materials: Stone and brick

Fort Shirley is a historic military outpost on the Caribbean island of Dominica. It was built by the British in 1765, and was named for Sir Thomas Shirley. The fort was the location of the 1802 revolt of the 8th West India Regiment. Today, Fort Shirley is part of Cabrits National Park, which was established as a national park in 1986.

== Location ==
Fort Shirley is located on a peninsula just north of Portsmouth, in an area known as Prince Rupert's Head. The fort overlooks two bays: Prince Rupert's Bay and Douglas Bay.

== History ==
The British began Fort Shirley's construction in 1765 as a garrison to defend north Dominica. The fort was named for Sir Thomas Shirley, Governor of the Leeward Islands at the time. From 1778 to 1784, the fort was extended by the French during their occupation of Dominica. The fort was built of brick and stone in the Georgian architectural style. It consisted of more than 50 buildings, including seven gun batteries, seven cisterns, powder magazines, and ordnance storehouses, as well as barracks that could house over 600 men.

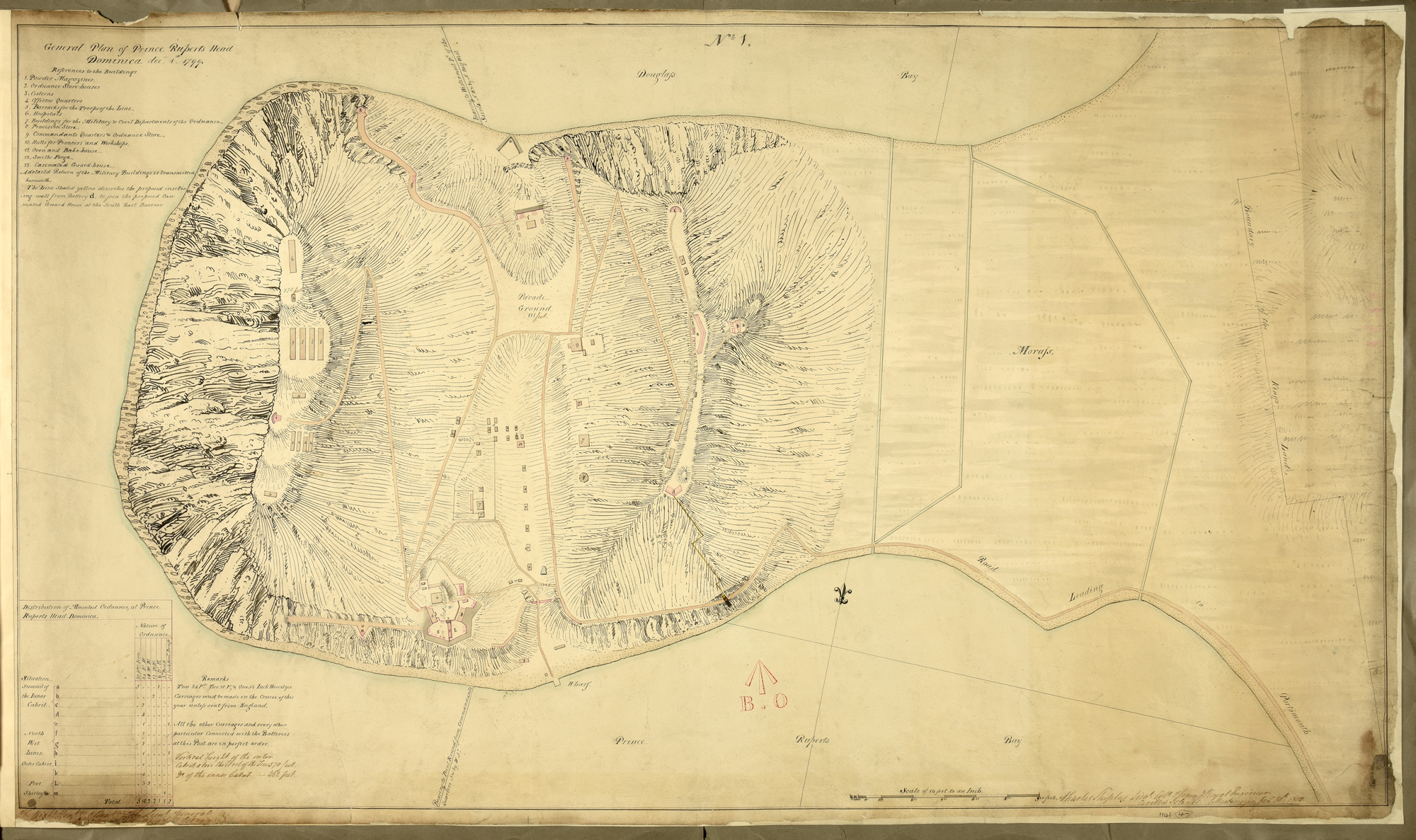
Plans for Fort Shirley at Prince Rupert's Head, surveyed in 1770s.

In April 1802, the revolt of the 8th West India Regiment took place at Fort Shirley. African soldiers, who were recruited as slaves and stationed at Fort Shirley, mutinied and took over the garrison for three days. They did so in protest of poor conditions, lack of pay, and fears of being sold back into slavery. The revolt influenced the Mutiny Act 1807, under which all serving soldiers recruited as slaves in the West India Regiments of the British Army were freed. By the 1850s, the fort had fallen out of use. It was abandoned in 1854, but remained in the hands of the British Admiralty. In 1901, the fort's ownership was transferred to the government of the Dominica and it remained designated as Crown Land. The fort and the land around were sometimes used as a quarantine station and agricultural station, as well as an experimental teak forestry project.

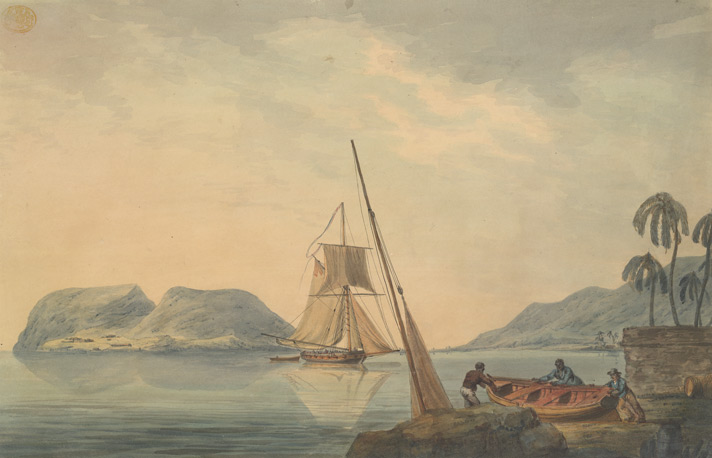
Painting of Prince Rupert's Bay, with Prince Rupert's Head and Fort Shirley in the distance, c. 1780.

== Restoration ==
After years of deterioration, Dr. Lennox Honychurch began restoration of the fort's structures in 1982. Several of the buildings have been completely restored, while ruins of the rest can be found scattered around the peninsula.

== Gallery ==
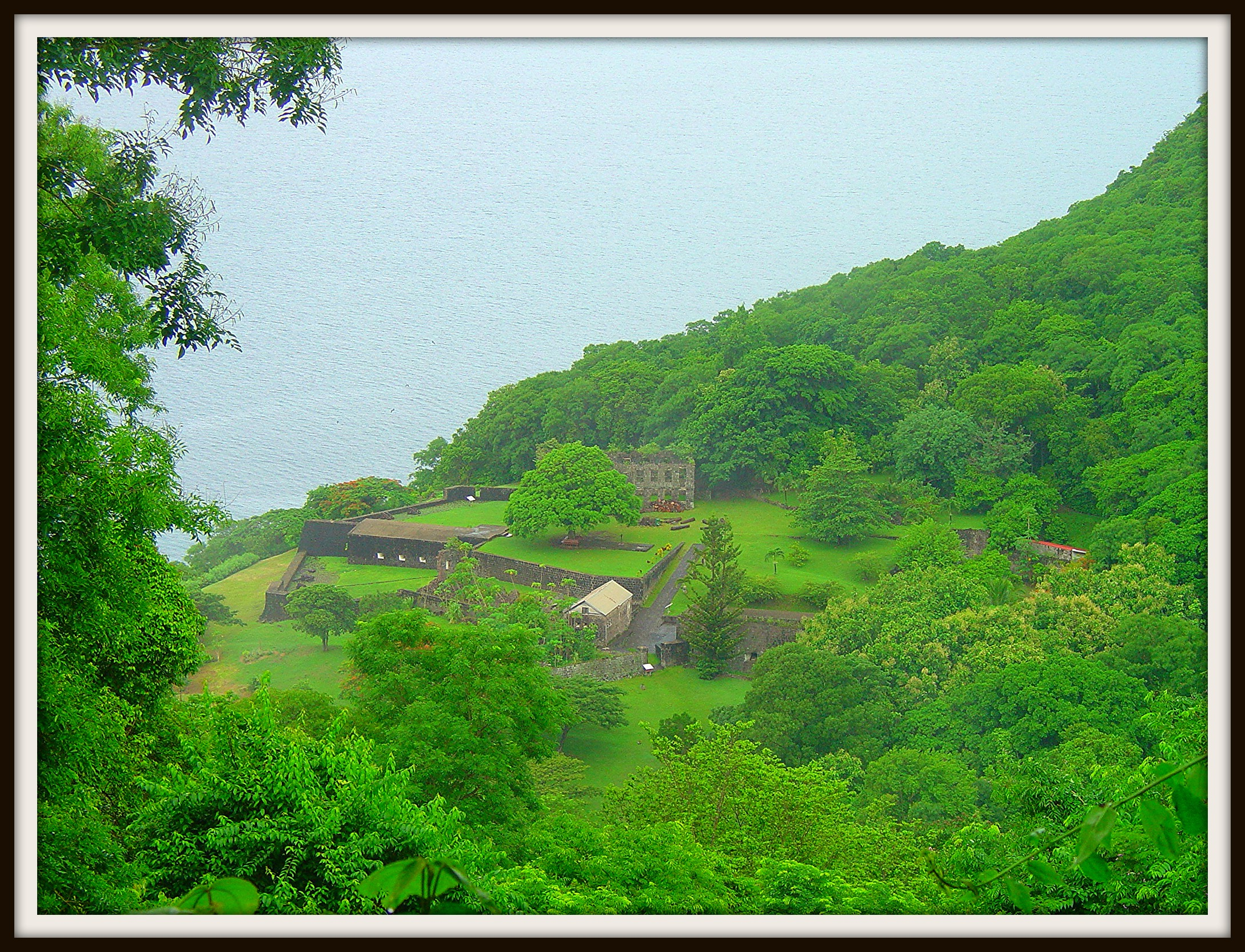
View of Fort Shirley from above

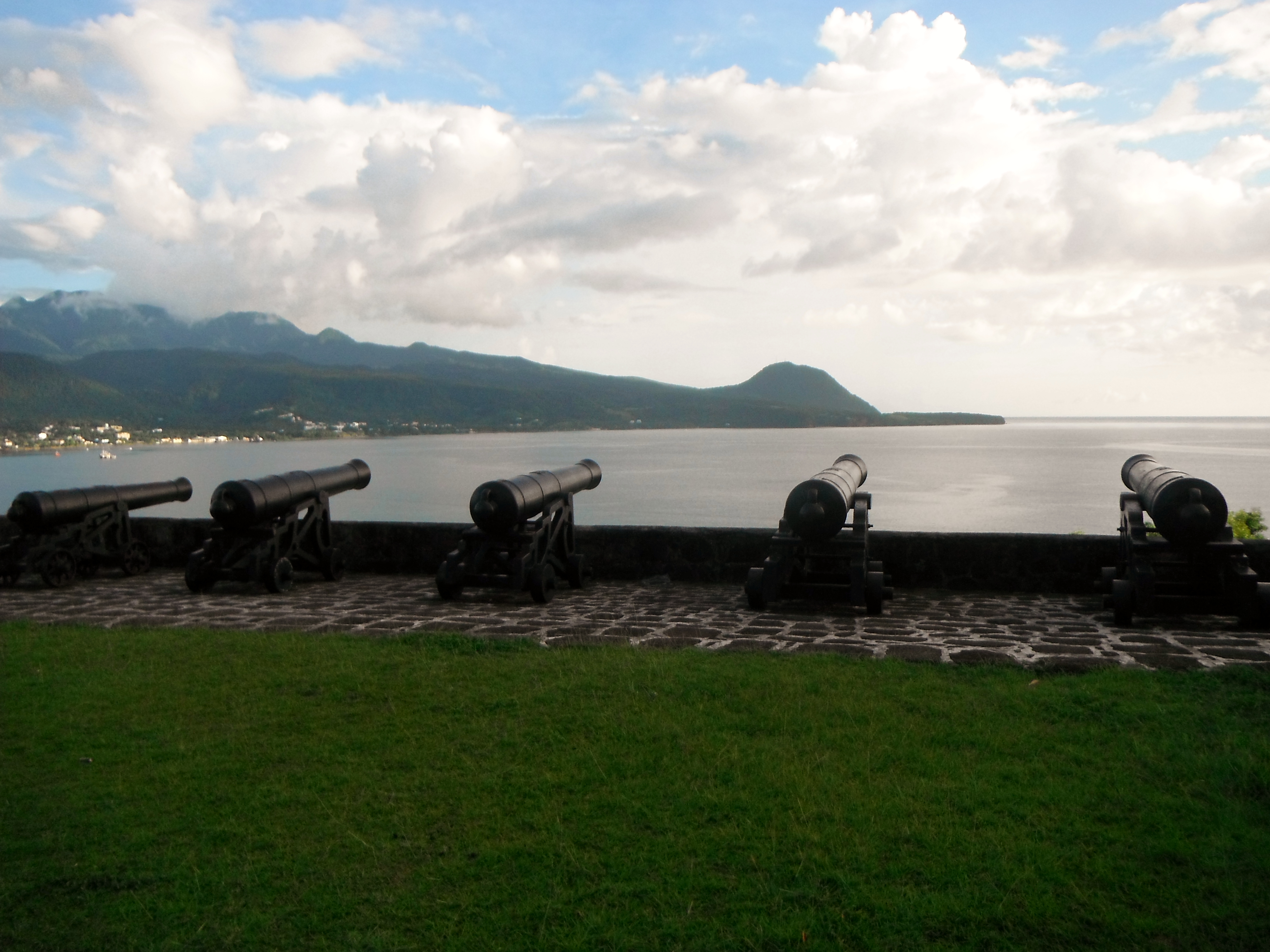
View of canons and Prince Rupert's Bay (beyond) from Fort Shirley

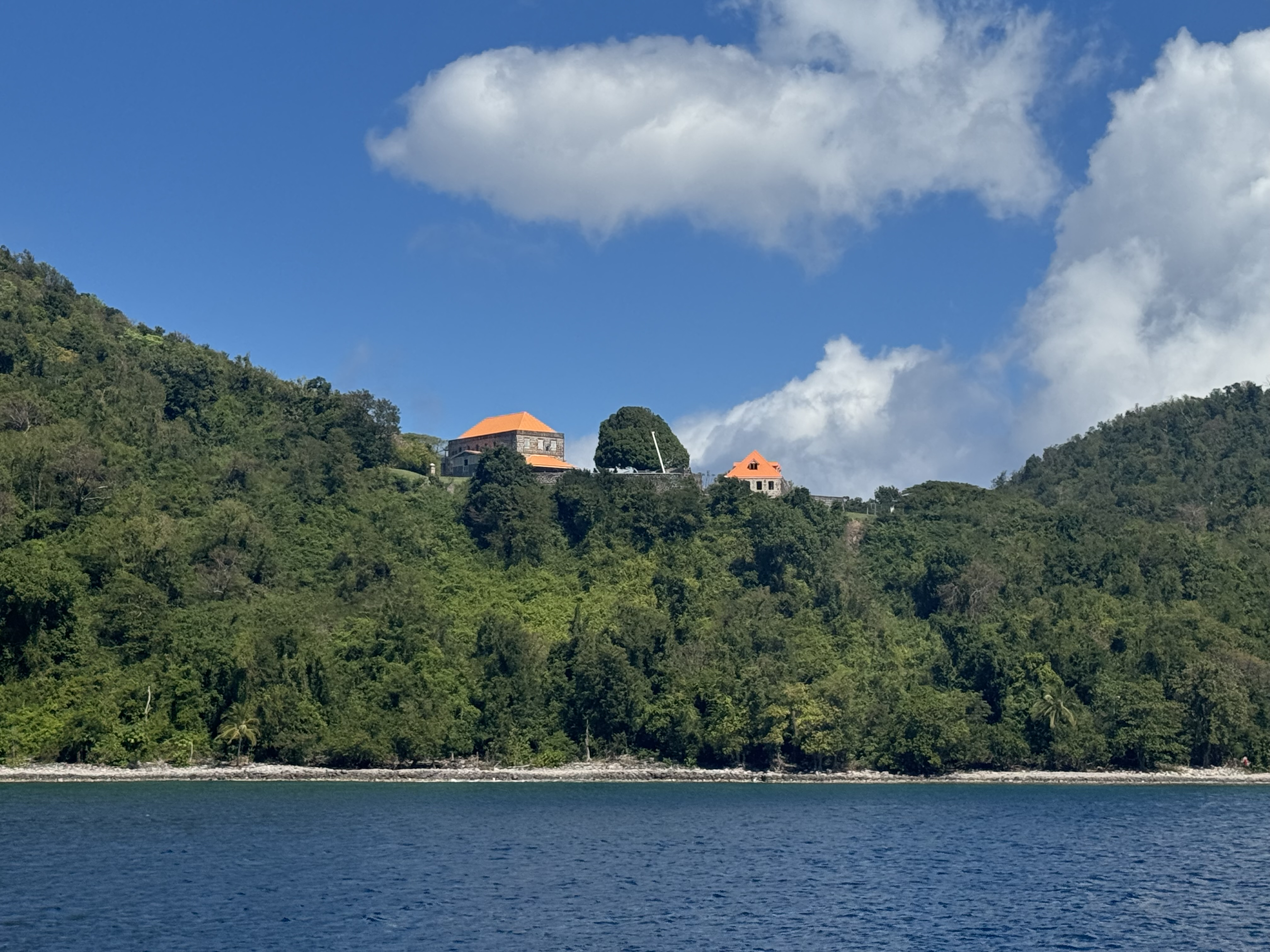
View of Fort Shirley from Prince Rupert's Bay
