= Belles, Dominica =

Belles Bassinville, Norway
- Village
- Location in Dominica
- Coordinates: 15°27′12.7″N 61°19′11.4″W
- Country: Dominica
- Parish: Saint Joseph Parish
- Elevation: 610.5 m (2,003 ft)

Population (2010)
  - Total: 500
- Time zone: UTC-4 (UTC)

Belles is a small village in the Caribbean island nation of Dominica. It is located at 15°27′12.7″N 61°19′11.4″W and is a part of the country's St. Joseph administrative division. Its population is 500. Belles is a historical site for a few reasons. It is a major part of the highway system to the northern part of the island. The roads were blocked many years ago by Rastafarians who were not happy with the government. Many of them escaped to Jaco Flats and used it for refuge. This is a site that was used by the Maroons hundreds of years ago. As of 2016, the Esprit and Benjamin families own and control a majority of the private land.

== History ==
=== Name ===
The Creole name for the town is Norway (pronounced as "nor-way". Belles previously named Bassinville got its modern name from Henry Hesketh Bell. This village is located near the center of the island. The main highway Nicholas Liverpool Highway runs north to Marigot. If the road is taken south, it ends up in Roseau, the capital of the island. There is a Catholic church in the village. It is dedicated to Saint Peter Donders (constructed 1929). The feast of Belles 'fete Belles' is celebrated yearly in the village. People come from near and far to celebrate. In recent years, the community, which was heavily dependent on agriculture, remains a significant contributor towards agricultural development on the island.

=== The Road ===
An excerpt from Lennox Honychurch, the islands most notable historian states that; By early 1947 the road cutting had only reached the hill at D'Leau Gommier and all of the money had disappeared. In three years of work the road had only progressed about a mile and a half. The project closed down and it was not resurrected for almost a decade. People spoke of "bobol" and they sang about it in two famous "chantè mas" during the masquerade of 1947: "Sa ki twavai Norway!" and "Si ou té Norway sa ou téké fè?

=== Local School ===
Belles houses a small government school. It is government sponsored and a majority of local residents attend. Many years ago, students walked many miles to school. This is no longer the case. The school department chatters local buses for the transportation of teachers and students. The primary school got a donation of refurbished computers in 2013.
