= Education in Dominica =

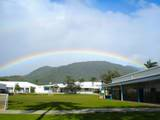
Ross University Medical School

Education in Dominica is compulsory from ages 5 to 16. The gross primary enrollment rate was 100.4 percent in 1991 and 98.2 percent in 1998, and the net primary enrollment rate was 88.7 percent in 1991 and 88.8 percent in 1998. Primary school attendance rates were unavailable for Dominica as of 2001. Poor physical conditions in many primary schools affect the quality of education, while some schools are overcrowded, limiting access to primary education, particularly for children living in urban areas around the capital. Poverty and work on family banana farms during the harvest season can affect school attendance, but other employment does not pull minors out of school. There is a significant Carib Indian population in Dominica, and schools on the Carib Territory are reported to have fewer resources.

Tertiary-level educations institutions include Dominica State College , the University of the West Indies Open Campus, All Saints University School of Medicine, International University for Graduate Studies, New World University, and Ross University School of Medicine.

The Human Rights Measurement Initiative (HRMI) finds that Dominica is fulfilling only 89.6% of what it should be fulfilling for the right to education based on the country's level of income. HRMI breaks down the right to education by looking at the rights to both primary education and secondary education. While taking into consideration Dominica's income level, the nation is achieving 89.1% of what should be possible based on its resources (income) for primary education and 90.2% for secondary education.
