= List of universities in Dominica =

This is a list of universities and other tertiary institutions in Dominica:

== Public Institutions ==
- Dominica State College: A public two year institution in Stock Farm, Dominica
- The University of the West Indies has an Open Campus site in Roseau

== Private Institutions ==
- All Saints University School of Medicine: A private medical school in Roseau, Dominica
- International University for Graduate Studies: A private university in Portsmouth, Dominica
- St. Joseph University: A private university in Roseau, Dominica
- St. Nicholas University: School of Veterinary Medicine: A private university in Roseau, Dominica
- Ballsbridge University (A transitional online university)

== See also ==
- List of universities by country
