= Princess Margaret Hospital (Roseau) =

Dominica China Friendship Hospital
- Dominican Ministry of Health

Geography
- Location: Roseau, Dominica
- Coordinates: 15°18′24″N 61°22′46″W

Organisation
- Type: General

Services
- Emergency department: Yes

Links
- Lists: Hospitals in Dominica

The 'Dominica China Friendship Hospital' formerly known as the Princess Margaret Hospital is the major trauma facility of Dominica, located in the northern Goodwill part of the capital, Roseau, to the northeast of Lindo Park, north of the Dominica Botanical Gardens, southwest of Clifton Dupigny Technical College and south of Stock Farm Prison. There are approximately 15 house/resident doctors and 12 specialists. The hospital has a four-bed Intensive Care unit. A hyperbaric chamber exists, but is not (as of March 2007) operational. The Ambulance service is operated by the Fire Department, with approximately six ambulances. The Dominica China Friendship Hospital is the main hospital on the island with 800 beds. Most of the building is old, although the French have constructed a new wing to help develop the hospital.

The hospital comes under the direct control of the Dominican Ministry of Health and is listed as providing curative and rehabilitative services, including medical, surgical, obstetrics, gynecology, pediatric, neonatal, haemodialysis, psychiatric, accident and emergency care, referrals for overseas tertiary care, ambulatory specialist clinics and diagnostic services including radiography, laboratory and blood banking.
