= Health in Dominica =

Life expectancy in Dominica was 74.2 years for men and 80.3 years for women in 2017. Infant mortality in 2013 was 8.0 per 1,000 live births.

== Healthcare ==
Health services in Dominica are financed largely by general taxes. Government spending on health was 4.2% of GDP in 2011, equivalent to US$418 per capita. Primary care services are provided at no cost at 7 health centres and 44 clinics around the country. Princess Margaret Hospital is the main hospital. There is a smaller hospital at Portsmouth and cottage hospitals at Marigot and Grand Bay. There is some commercial outpatient care provided by private practitioners. Tertiary care is mostly provided outside the country. People under the age of 17 years old, pregnant women, the indigent, and those suffering from communicable diseases are exempt from medical care charges.

The government is part of the Eastern Caribbean Drug Service, a pooled procurement scheme for importing pharmaceuticals and medical supplies.

All Saints University School of Medicine is a commercial organisation based in Roseau.
