= Woodbridge Bay =

Coordinates: 15°18′48″N 61°23′28″W

Woodbridge Bay is a bay on the southwestern coast of Dominica off Stock Farm, north of the main centre of Roseau and south of the village of Canefield. It is the main port of entry into Dominica.
