= Donald Peters =

Donald Peters may refer to:

- DJ Peters (Donald Scott Peters, born 1995), American baseball outfielder
- Donald C. Peters, president of the Dominica State College

== See also ==
- Don Peters, American gymnastics coach
