= Stock Farm =

Suburb of Roseau, Dominica

Coordinates: 15°18′37″N 61°23′00″W

Stock Farm or Stockfarm is a northern suburb of Roseau, Dominica. It contains the national prison of Dominica Stock Farm Prison, the Dominica State College and a netball and basketball stadium. Woodbridge Bay and the main port of entry into Dominica lie off Stock Farm. Stockfarm is located between Goodwill and Tarishpit. The paliment representative is Myriam Blanchard.
