= Donald C. Peters =

4th President of DSC
- Incumbent
- Assumed office May 2010
- Preceded by: Hubert J. Charles

Donald C. Peters is the current president of the Dominica State College and has been incumbent since 2010.
