= Stock Farm Prison =

Prison in Roseau, Dominica

Coordinates: 15°18′41″N 61°23′3″W

Stock Farm Prison is the national prison of the Caribbean island of Dominica. It lies in the northern part of the city of Roseau, in the Stock Farm neighborhood, just to the northwest of Dominica State College. As of 2010 it had a prison population of 289, up from 229 in 1992, which, given its size, is severely overcrowded. As of 2010 it was directed by Denis A. Blanc, under the Dominica Prison Service. A Department for International Development small grants scheme has enabled the Foreign and Commonwealth Office to launch a training programme in the prison for the convicts such as bricklaying, carpentry and plumbing to enhance their job prospects after being released.
