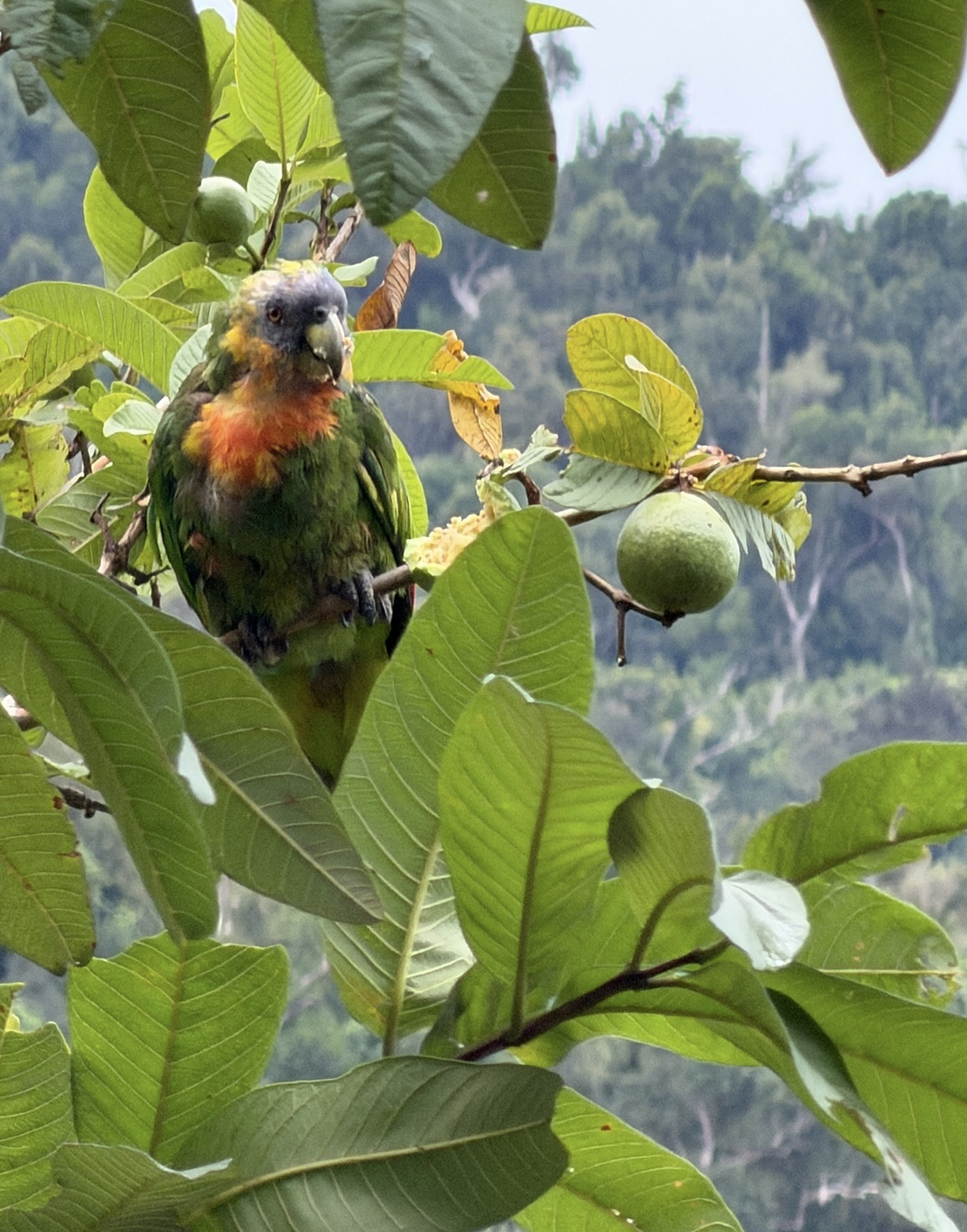
- In a guava tree, in Dominica

Conservation status
- Vulnerable (IUCN 3.1)
- CITES Appendix I

Scientific classification
- Kingdom: Animalia
- Phylum: Chordata
- Class: Aves
- Order: Psittaciformes
- Family: Psittacidae
- Genus: Amazona
- Species: A. arausiaca

Binomial name
- Amazona arausiaca (Müller, 1776)

Synonyms
- Amazona bouqueti

= Red-necked amazon =

Species of bird

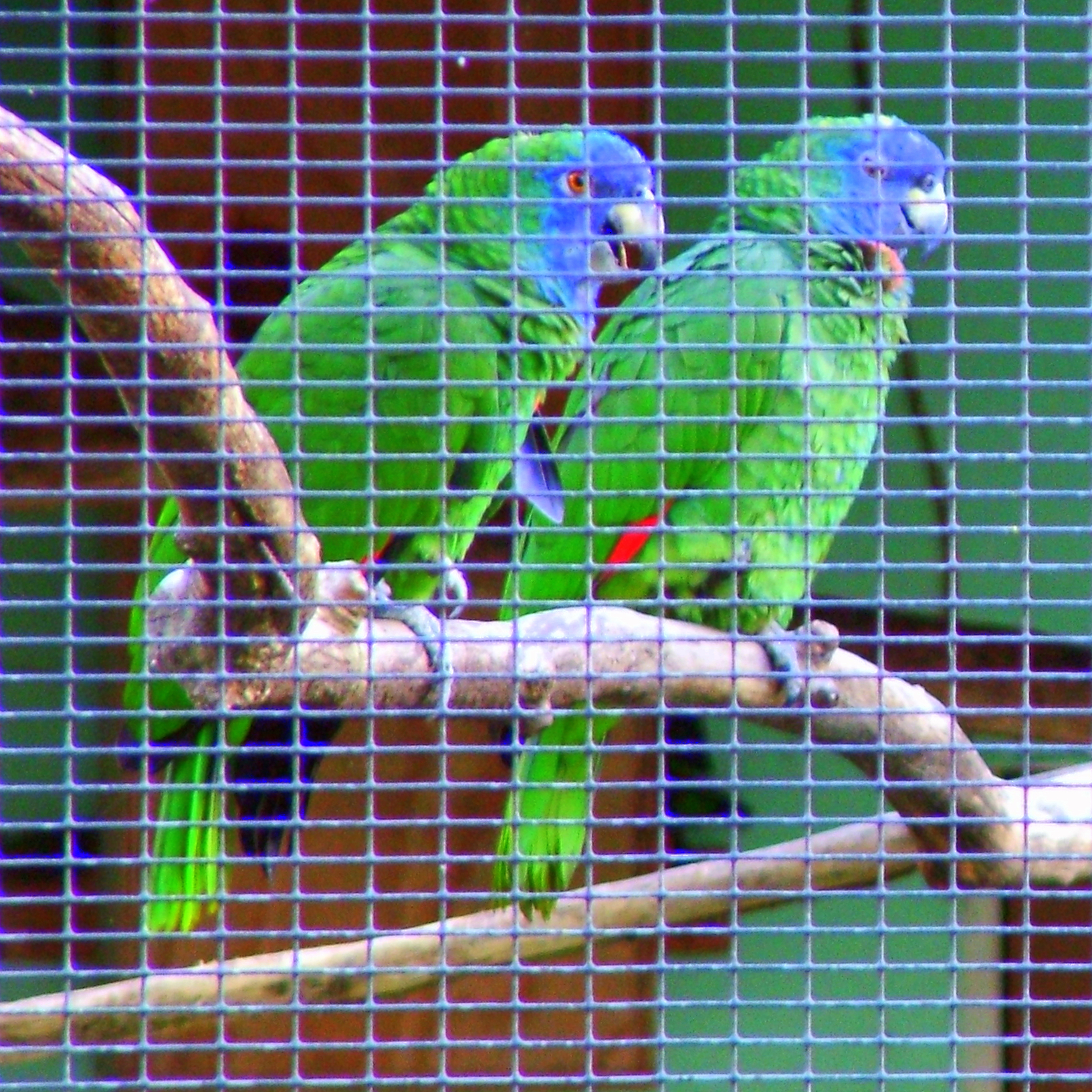
At the Parrot Conservation and Research Centre Botanical Gardens, Roseau, Dominica

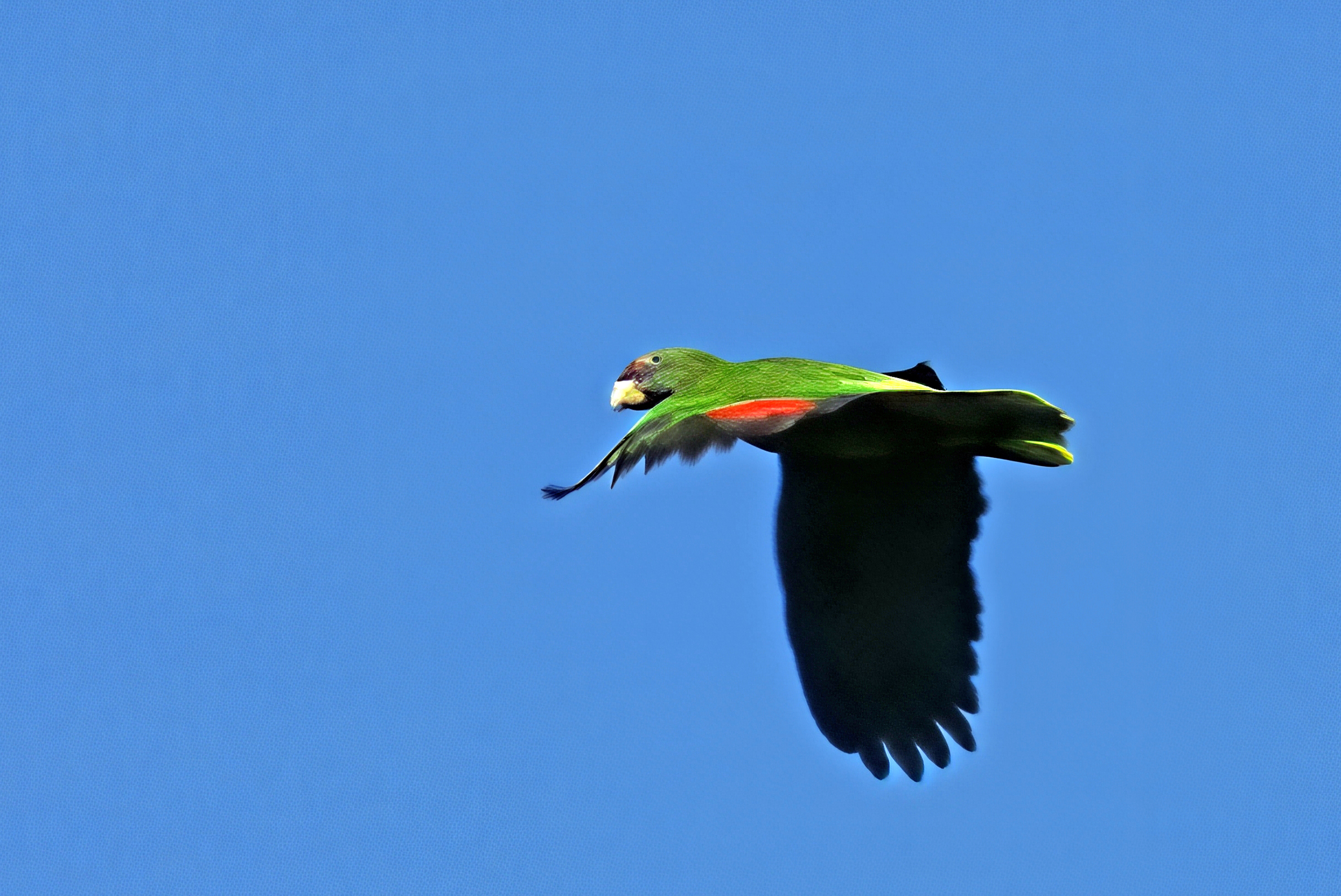
In flight, in Dominica

The red-necked amazon (Amazona arausiaca), known locally as the jaco parrot or jaco, is an amazon parrot species endemic to the island of Dominica. Other names include red-necked parrot, Dominican blue-faced amazon, and lesser Dominican amazon. It gets its name from the area of orange and reddish plumage commonly found at its throat. This parrot is a vulnerable species, with an estimated population of 850-1000 mature individuals. It is fully protected under Dominican law.

== Description ==
The red-necked amazon averages about 40 cm in length and can weigh between 550 and 650 g. Most of the bird's body is covered in deep bottle green feathers, and a wide band of yellow color runs down to the tip of its tail. It commonly has orange and reddish feathers on its throat. The bird sometimes has blue feathers on its forehead, around the eyes, and its head; these blue feathers transition to gray feathers at its upper breast. The beak and feet are both grey.

== Range, habitat ==
The red-necked amazon is only found in the Caribbean island of Dominica. It dwells in the canopy of rainforests. The birds are primarily located in the old-growth forests of Morne Diablotion (in northern Dominica) and Morne Trois Pitons National Park (in central Dominica), both of which are protected habitats.

This species can sometimes be found at subordinate altitudes in agricultural regions and peripheral forests all the way to the northwest and northeast coasts. The parrots primarily eat citrus fruits, flowers, sprouts, seeds, as well as pastoral crops.

== Social organisation ==
The species is highly social and flies in groups of 30 or more during the non-breeding season. Exceedingly territorial during nesting, breeding inaugurates from January to March, with fledging from May to July.

Red-necked amazon pairs are loyal to each other and tend to stay at the same nesting site for many years. Other than early morning and afternoon calls, these birds are fairly quiet and difficult to detect in the wild because they are well cloaked by their fluff. They are dexterous climbing birds and are prone to migrate seasonally, provisional on food supplies.

== Call ==
Red-necked amazons are most vigorous and animated in the early mornings from dawn to around 10 am, and again in the late afternoon after about 4 pm. During those periods they are most communicative. The cry of the red-necked amazon is rough with a high-pitched squawk and usually uses two-syllable notes.

== Threats ==
Red-necked amazon numbers declined in the 20th Century. Threats included hunting, and, to a lesser extent, the pet trade. Today, hunting and illegal trade no longer pose a serious threat.

More recent threats include the clearing of forests for agriculture, and hurricanes. After Hurricane David in 1979, the parrot's population fell to an all-time low of 150. By 2003, through substantial conservation action, this species recovered to a far healthier (estimated) 750 to 800 birds. The population continued to rise, and by 2017 had reached an estimated population of about 1200. In September 2017, Hurricane Maria devastated the entirety of Dominica. The hurricane took a toll on the parrot's population, but the species did survive. All of the captive birds were safe after the Hurricane Maria and several wild birds were sighted flying around the island.
