= Morne Bruce =

Hillside enclave in Roseau, Dominica

Coordinates: 15°17′57″N 61°22′43″W

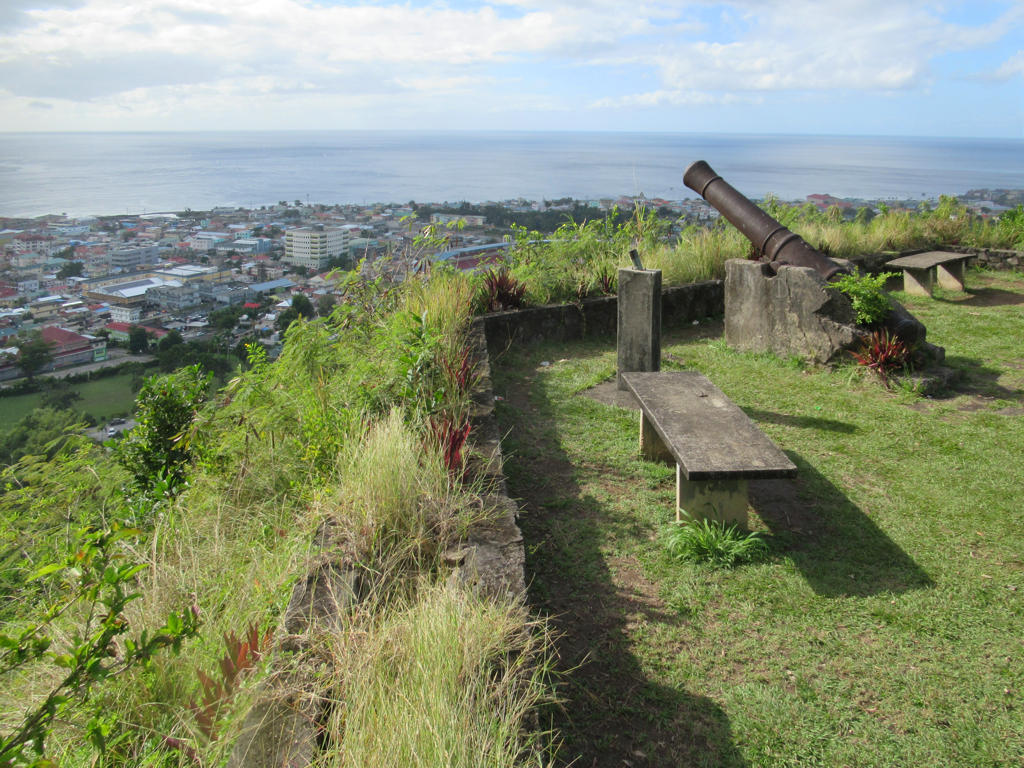
View from Morne Bruce, ft. cannon

Morne Bruce is a hillside enclave located in Roseau, Dominica. It offers a panoramic view of the city and the Caribbean Sea beyond. The site was once home to the military garrison that protected Roseau. Remains of the original barracks and officers' quarters can still be seen today. One of the old cannons (non-operational) is still located at the site, near a giant cross that was erected in the 1920s. Morne Bruce is accessible by road or via Jack's Walk, a trail that begins in the Dominica Botanical Gardens.

== Etymology ==
It was named after James Bruce, a captain of the Royal Engineers who designed many of Dominica's forts in the 1700s.

== History ==
The hill was once home to a military garrison that protected Roseau from the 1770s to 1854 from the French. Remains of the original barracks and officers’ quarters can still be seen today, along with one of the old cannons. A giant cross was erected at the summit of Morne Bruce in the 1920s.

The idea of establishing the Roseau Botanic Gardens near Morne Bruce was conceived in 1889 by the British Crown Government.

== Gallery ==
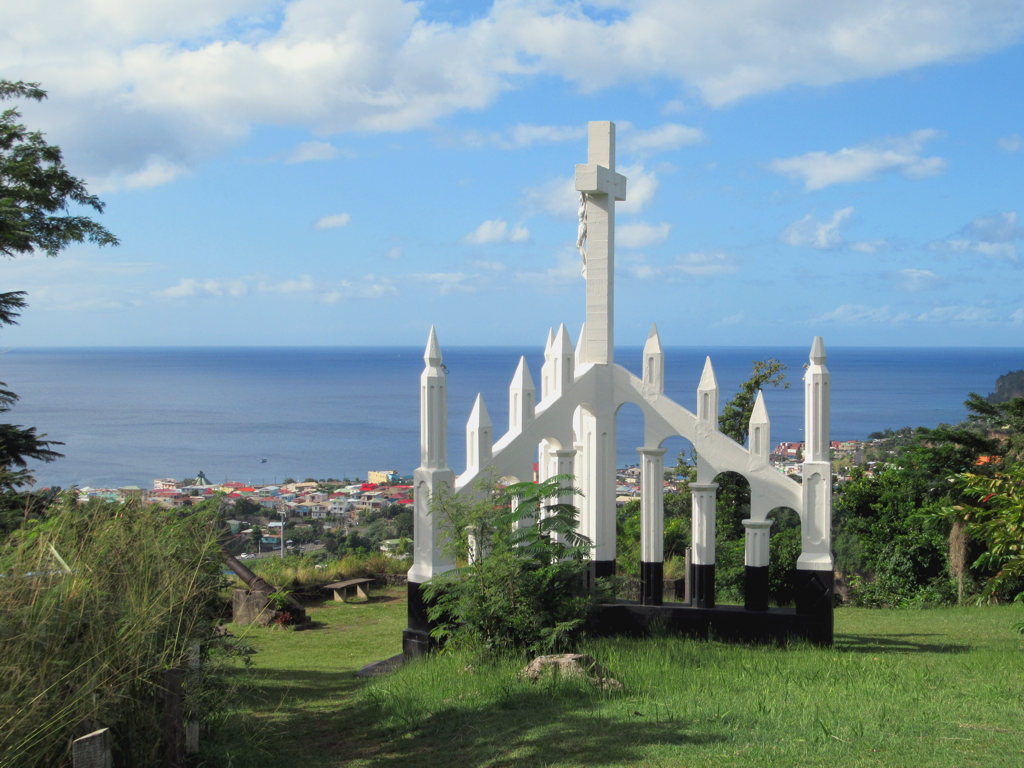
Morne Bruce Cross, with town of Roseau below

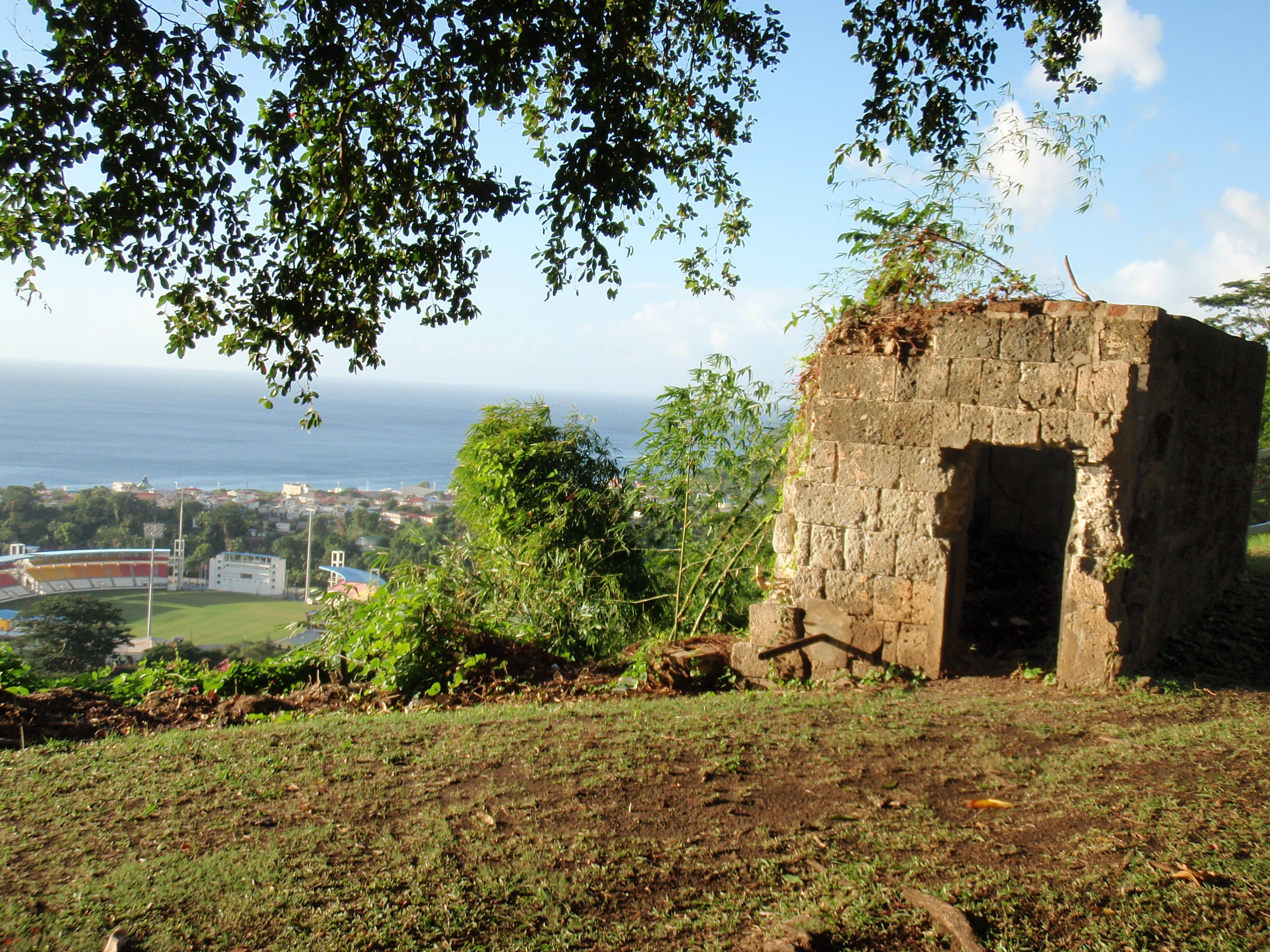
Fort ruins at Morne Bruce

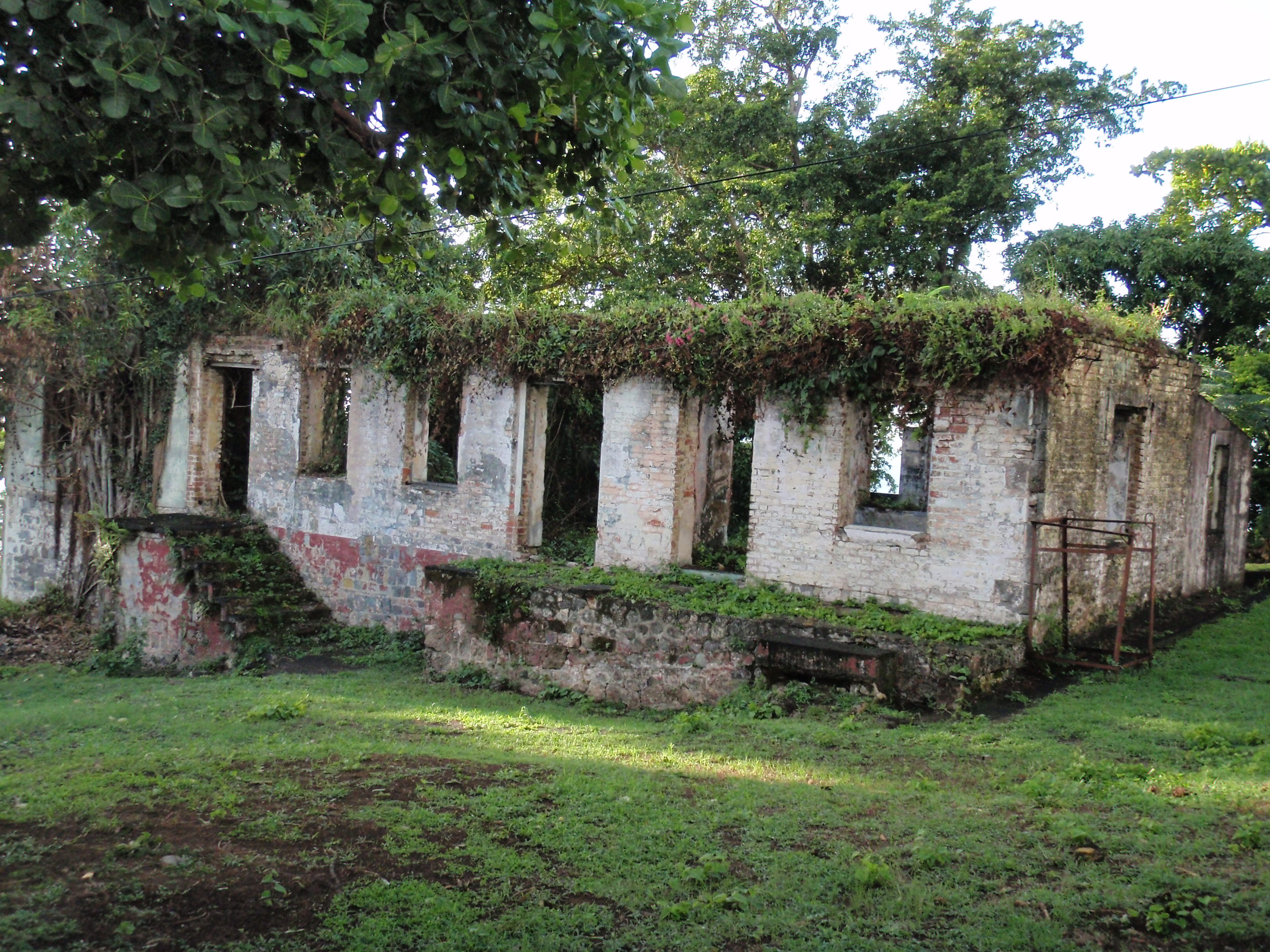
Fort ruins at Morne Bruce

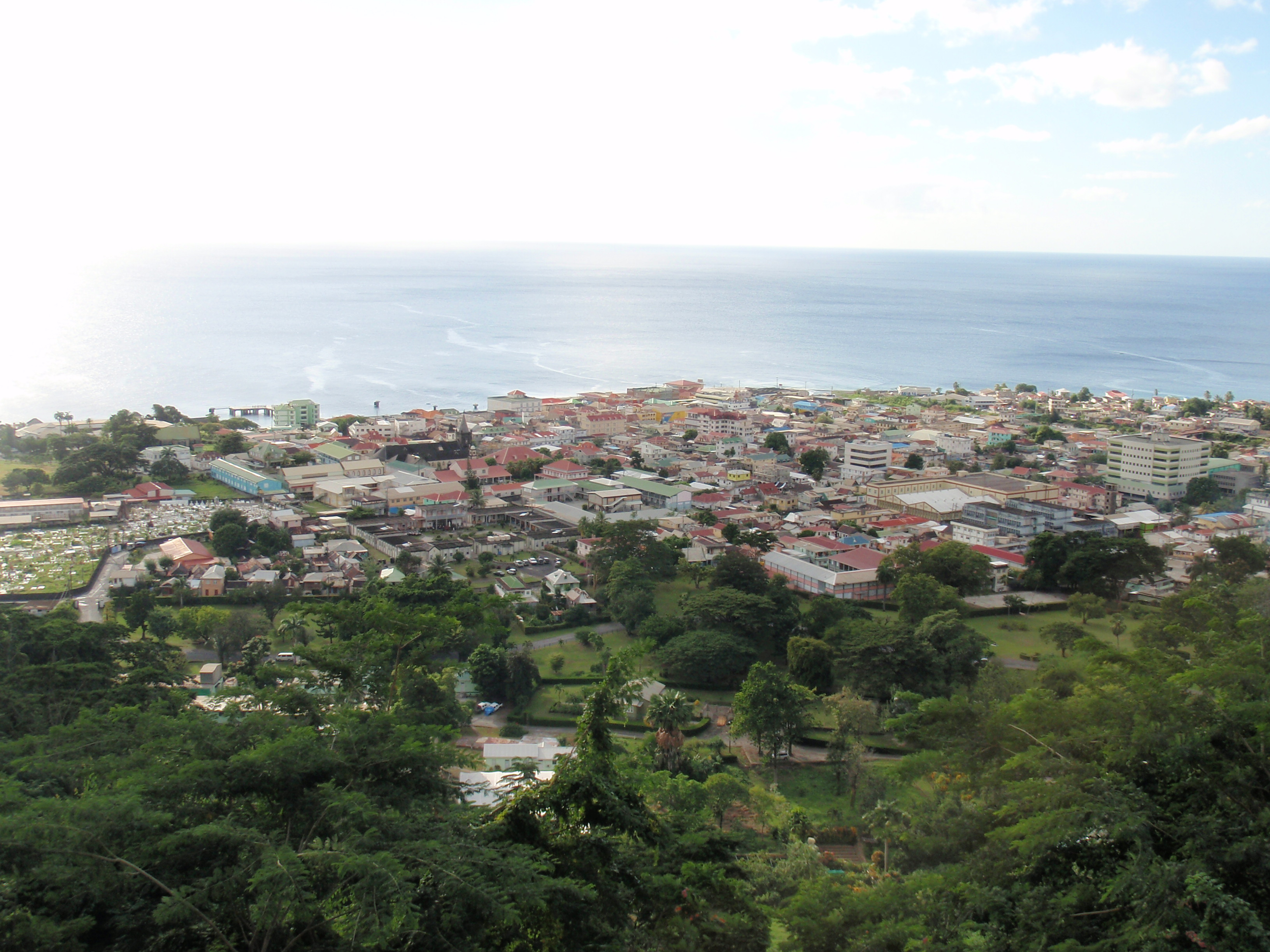
View from Morne Bruce, overlooking Roseau

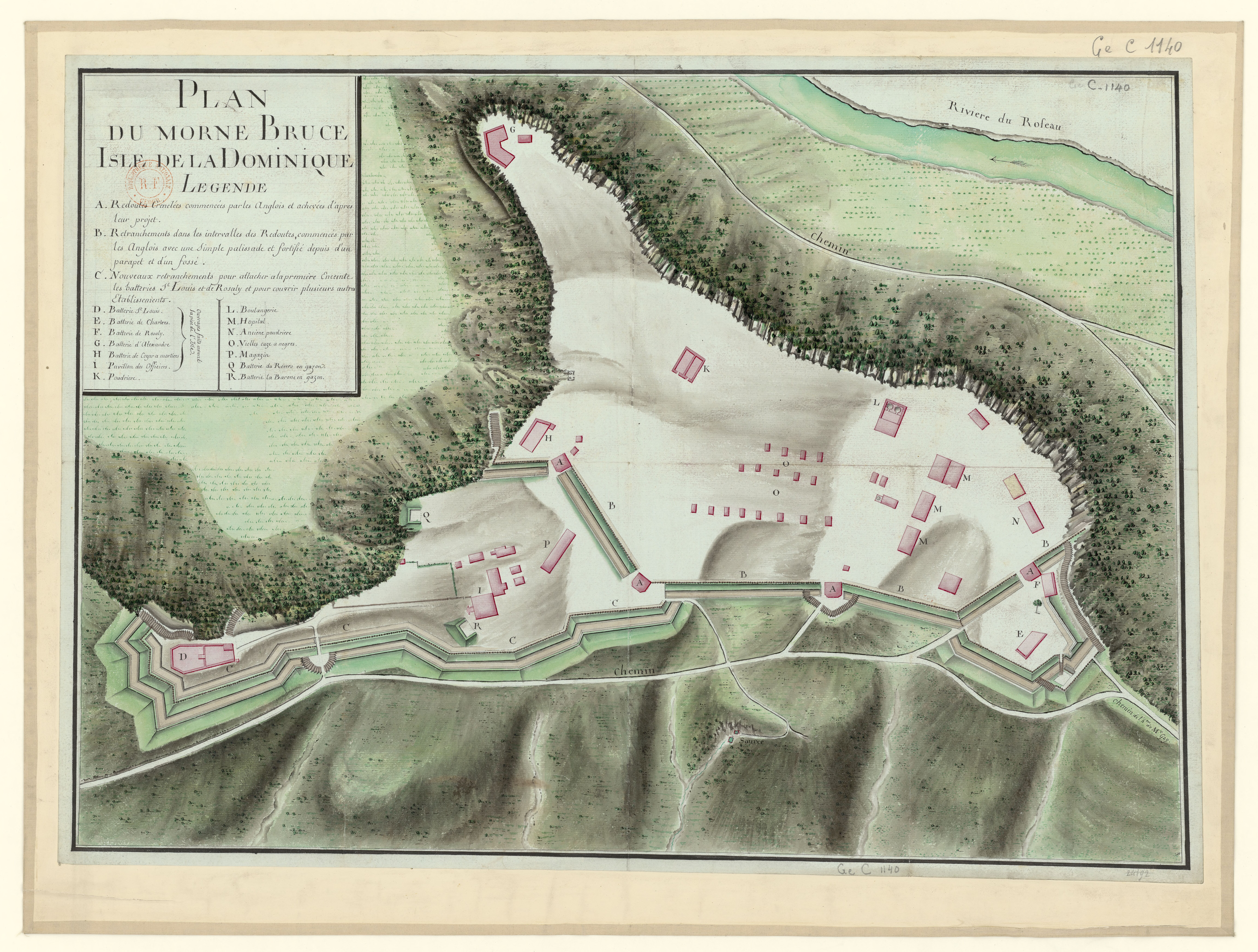
French map/plan of Morne Bruce

== See also ==
- History of Dominica
- List of trails in Dominica
