= Hubert J. Charles =

Dominican diplomat and educator

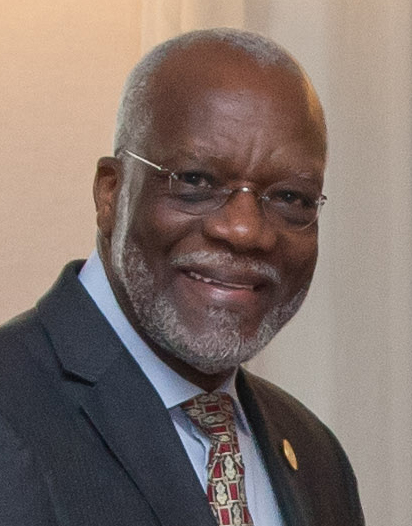
Hubert John Charles

Hubert J. Charles (born 23 October 1948) is a Dominican diplomat and educator. He is the current ambassador of Dominica to the Organization of American States and to the United States.

Charles was born in Portsmouth, Dominica and grew up on the island. He graduated from the Dominica Grammar School in 1969. He earned a B.A. in history and economics from the University of the West Indies in Barbados in 1972, and then taught history and commerce at Dominica Grammar School from September 1972 to July 1974. In 1977, he earned an M.A. in Atlantic history and culture from Johns Hopkins University in the United States.

After completing his education, Charles served from July to October 1977 as Assistant Secretary in the Ministry of Education, Sports and Culture in the Dominican government. He next served as the headmaster of the Dominica Grammar School from October 1977 to June 1981. Charles was appointed Permanent Secretary of the Ministry of Education, Sports and Culture and held that position from January 1981 to December 1985.

Charles served as an Advisor on Special Programs to the Organization of Eastern Caribbean States from June 1986 to October 1995. Between 1991 and 2006, he also served in various posts in UNESCO in the Caribbean and Africa. In January 1991, he became the UNESCO Representative to Barbados and the Eastern Caribbean, based in Bridgetown, Barbados. In November 1995, he became the UNESCO Educational Advisor in Pretoria, South Africa, serving until April 1998. In June 1998 he became the UNESCO Representative and Head of Office in Maputo, Mozambique, serving until December 2000. Finally, in January 2001, he became the UNESCO Representative and Director of the Office for the Economic Community of West African States, serving in Abuja, Nigeria until October 2006.

Charles returned to Dominica in late 2006. He served as President of Dominica State College from May 2007 until early 2010. He was appointed Ambassador to the U.S. as Permanent Representative to the Organization of American States in June 2010.

== Works ==
- Advocacy and Change: Promoting Innovative Approaches to Education and Culture (2008), an essay collection
