= New World University =

- Type: Private
- Established: 2016
- President: Steve Foerster
- Location: Roseau, Dominica
- Website: newworld.ac

New World University is a private university in Roseau, Dominica. It offers a one-year undergraduate certificate, a two-year undergraduate diploma, and a three years Bachelor of Science degree in International Business Leadership. It also sponsors research, including Sub-Saharan Monitor, which tracks political, economic, and cultural news and trends in Africa south of the Sahara.
