= Dominica Botanical Gardens =

Botanical garden located on the Caribbean island-nation of Dominica

Coordinates: 15.301245°N 61.381908°W

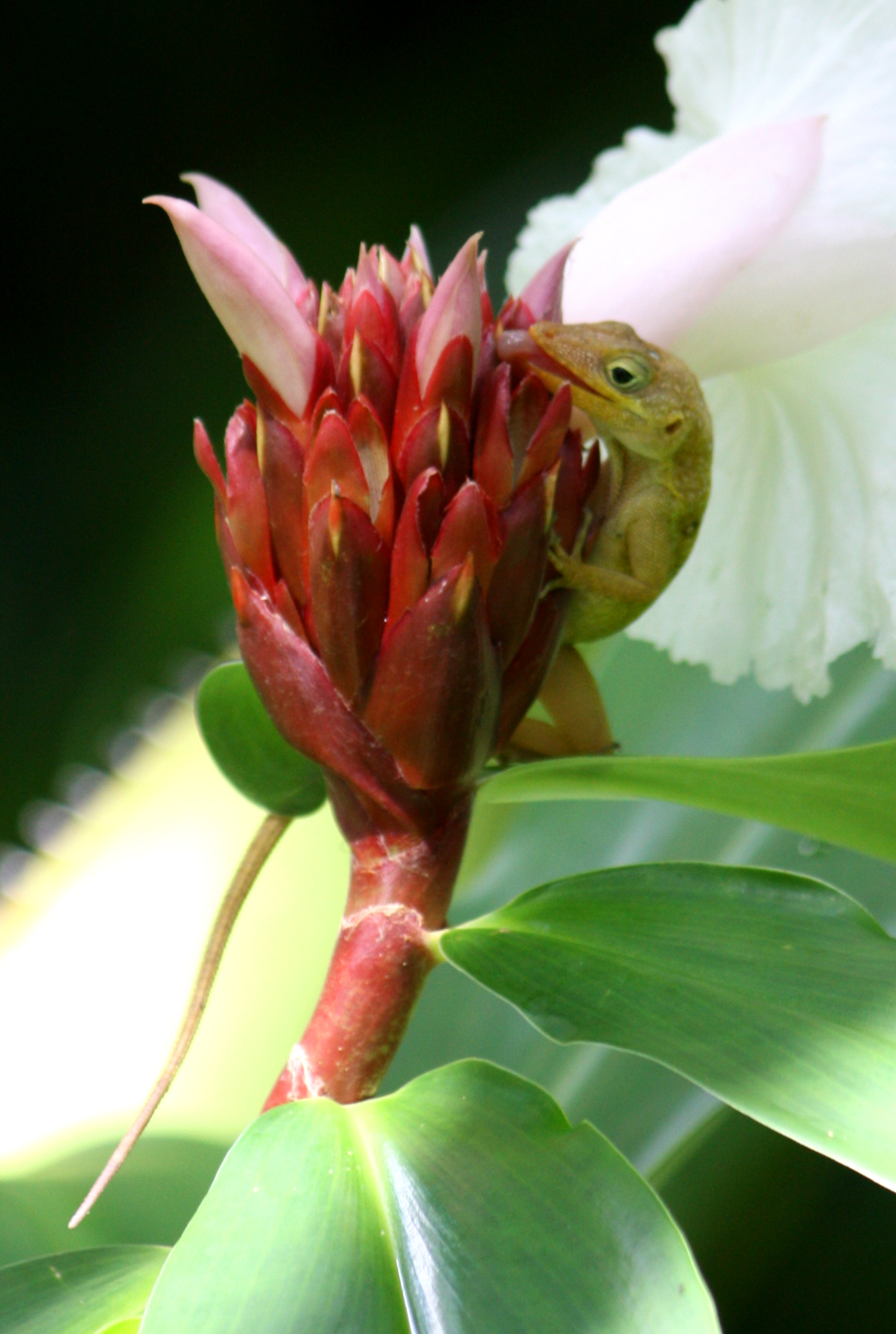
A Dominican anole (Anolis oculatus) feasts on a flower at the Botanical Gardens.

Dominica Botanic Gardens is located on the Caribbean island-nation of Dominica, in the capital of Roseau. Once known as one of the finest botanical gardens in the region, it was severely damaged by Hurricane David in 1979. Following restoration efforts, it remains a focus of cultural life in Roseau, and a center of conservation research on Dominica.

== History ==
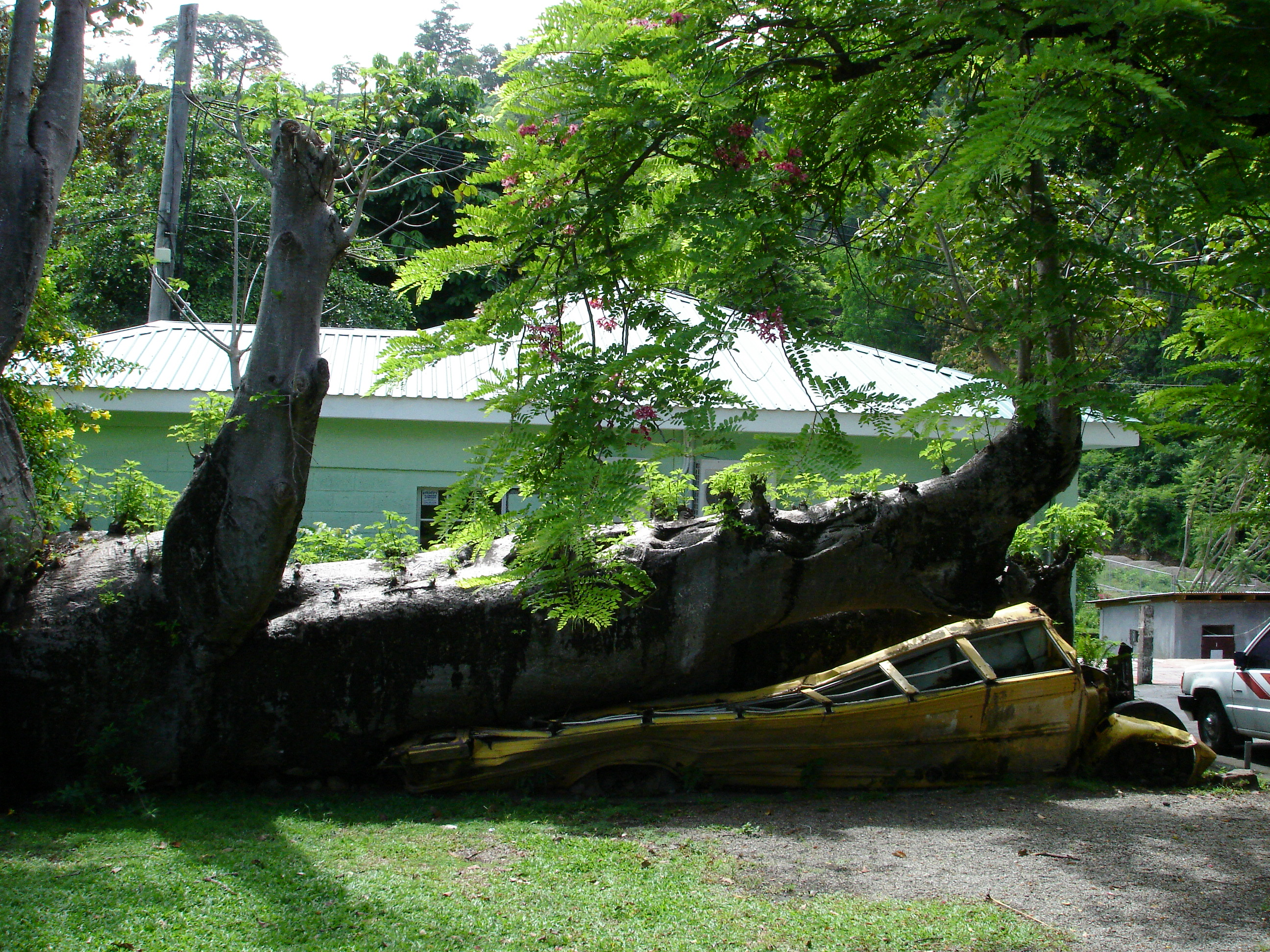
A school bus was crushed by an African baobab tree toppled by Hurricane David in 1979; the bus and tree remain in the gardens.

The Botanic Gardens were established when Dominica was still a colony in the British Empire. The Crown Government began planning the gardens in 1889, with the goal of encouraging crop diversification and to provide farmers with correctly propagated seedlings. The 16 hectares of land, formerly a sugar plantation within Bath Estate, was sold to the government in 1891 by its owner, William Davies.

Planting of the gardens began in 1890. Its first curator was Charles Murray of the Royal Botanic Garden Edinburgh. He was soon replaced by Henry F. Green, who planned and laid out the grounds. Joseph Jones took over its management in 1892, and remained involved throughout his life; Jones would also become the first Superintendent of the Imperial Department of Agriculture for the West Indies in 1898. Botanists from Kew Gardens in England supplied a variety of tropical species from around the world. Though its primary purpose remained economic and experimental, Jones introduced ornamental plants to make the grounds attractive.

It became known as among the finest botanical gardens in the West Indies by the 1930s. The gardens were severely damaged by Hurricane David in 1979, which destroyed many of its impressive old trees. One of the trees, a gigantic African baobab tree, fell and crushed an empty school bus; the tree and bus remain as a relic of the destruction within the gardens. Many plants have since been restored.

== Flora and fauna ==
The gardens include the bois kwaib (Sabinea carinalis), Dominica's national tree and flower, and many other tropical trees and palms. Noted specimens include the cannonball tree (Couroupita guianensis), banyan (Ficus benghalensis), century palm (Coripha umbraculifera), and ylang ylang (Cananga odorata).

The two endemic lizard species, the Dominican ground lizard and the Dominican anole, are common on the grounds of the Botanical Gardens. It is also frequently visited by a variety of wild birds, including three species of hummingbirds, carib grackles, and the green heron.

== Conservation facilities ==
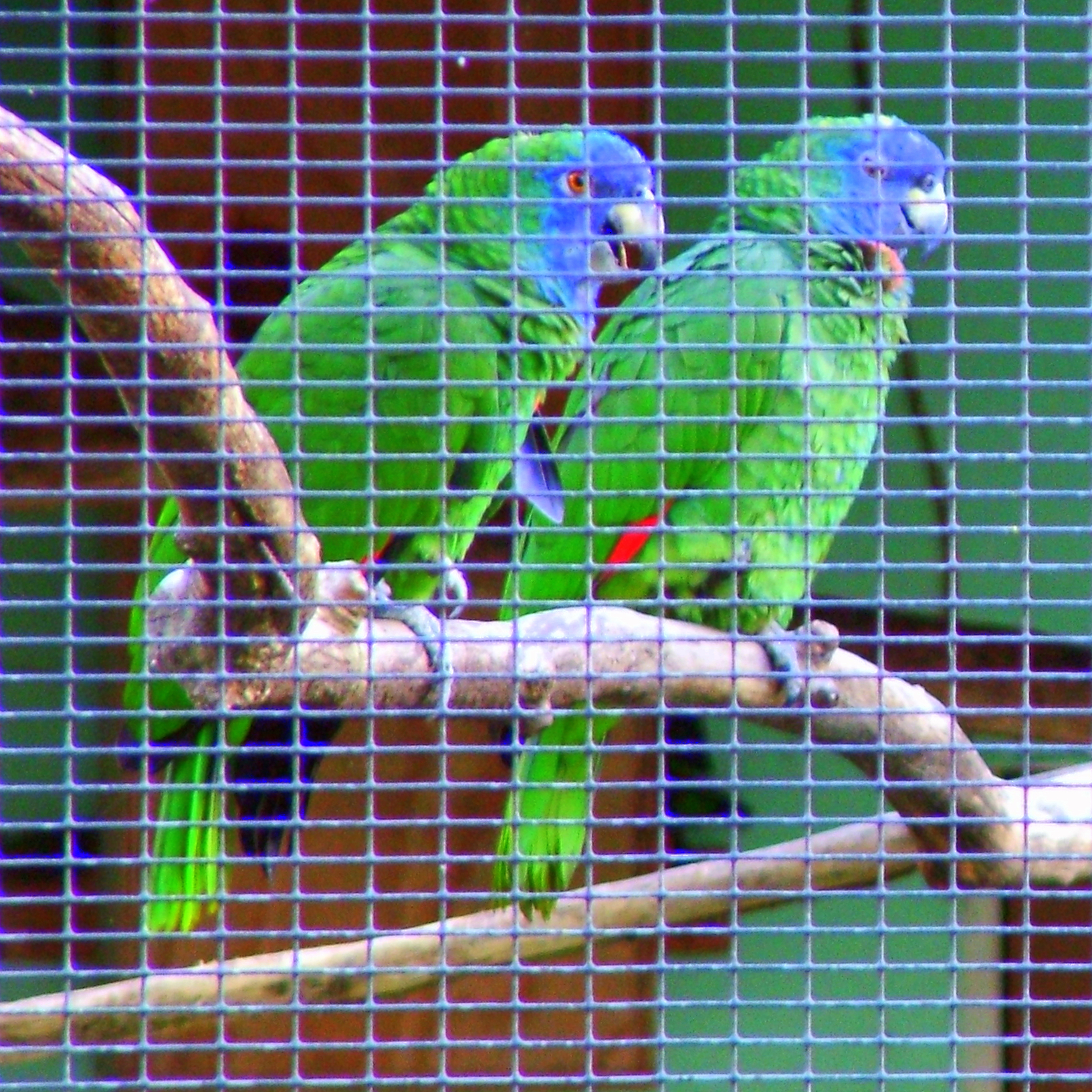
Two jacko parrots (Amazona arausiaca), at the Parrot Conservation and Research Centre.

The Dominica Ministry of Agriculture and Forestry maintains laboratories at the Botanic Gardens for conservation research. The Parrot Conservation and Research Centre focuses on protection efforts for the two endemic parrot species locally known as the Jacko (Amazona arausiaca) and the Sisserou (Amazona imperialis), both of which are endangered.

A molecular diagnostic laboratory was also established at the Botanic Gardens under the Darwin Initiative, to study the threat of chytridiomycosis to amphibian populations, in particular the endangered frog known as the mountain chicken (Leptodactylus fallax).

The offices of the Dominica Forestry and Wildlife Division were also located at the Botanic Gardens for fifty years, moving off-site in late 2009.

== Activities ==
The Dominica Botanic Gardens is one of the few open spaces remaining in Roseau. It has long been a venue for cricket matches, and was the main cricket ground in Dominica until the development of Windsor Park, opposite the gardens, in 1971.

Creole in the Park, a four-day music and cultural event, is held during the last week in October as part of World Creole Music Festival and Dominica's independence celebrations. State parades are also often held there.

Jack's Walk begins in the Dominica Botanical Gardens. The trail was constructed in the 1880s during the establishment of the Botanic Gardens. Jack's Walk is a 15-minute steep climb, leading to the top of Morne Bruce.
