= International University for Graduate Studies =

- Type: Private
- Established: 1979
- Administrative staff: Joyette Daniel
- Location: Portsmouth, Dominica
- Website: iugrad.edu.dm

International University for Graduate Studies is a private university in Portsmouth, Dominica.

International University for Graduate Studies (IUGS) was founded in 1979 and was initially accredited in the mid-1980s. Accreditation from a sovereign country is the highest form of accreditation.

The University operates under a permit from the Ministry of Education and Human Resource Development of the Commonwealth of Dominica.

IUGS is accredited by the National Accreditation Board (NAB) of the Commonwealth of Dominica.
