= Dominica State College =

National college in Roseau, Dominica

Coordinates: 15°18′37″N 61°22′46″W

- Former names: Clifton Dupigny Community College (CDCC)
- Motto: Beyond Quality and Excellence
- Type: Public College
- Established: 2002
- President: Dr. Donald C. Peters (2010 - 2023)
- Academic staff: 146 (2021)
- Students: Approx. 1400 (2021)
- Location: Stock Farm, Dominica
- Campus: 9.9 acres (4.0 ha)
- Colours: Green and yellow
- Website: https://www.dsc.edu.dm

Dominica State College (DSC) is a national college in Stockfarm, Dominica. It is an amalgamation of The Technical College, The Dominica Teachers Training College, The Sixth Form College, and The Princess Margaret Hospital School of Nursing, through the Dominica State College Act of 2002. DSC is the largest educational institution in Dominica by active student population.

DSC offers courses in Arts, Applied Arts, Business, Health, Hospitality, Natural Sciences, Social Sciences, Tourism, and General Studies to its active student population of approximately 1400.

== History ==
The amalgamation was the idea of Prime Minister Rosie Douglas. As outlined by Peters, who at the time was at the State University of New York at Plattsburgh. The Dominica State College was planned as a transition from four already established educational institutions. The idea was brought to fruition and proposed to parliament by the then Minister for Education Honourable Roosevelt Skerrit. Skerrit took an inclusive approach and invited all stakeholders in Dominica to contribute to the development of the new college by participating in 16 transition teams representing all aspects newly developed College. Mr Zechariach Pollock, Head of the Education Planning Unit of the Ministry of Education Headed the initiative, supported by consultant Dr. Hilroy Thomas, and assisted by Miss Avril Warner and Dr. Helen Francis Seaman.

The Clifton Dupigny College Academic Division would become the Faculty of Arts & Science, Clifton Dupigny Technical Division would become the Faculty of Applied Science & Technology, Teachers Training College would become the Faculty of Education and Human Development, and the School of Nursing would become the Faculty of Nursing and Health Sciences. The State College was planned to provide students with the first two years of their university education. It was hoped that the State College would begin offering 4 year degrees by 2010. DSC held its first graduation ceremony in July 2003, and the school was also officially opened at the same ceremony although it was actually established in September 2002. It was established by an Act of Parliament.

In 2008, construction was approved for a new Dominica State College with construction funding expected to come from the People’s Republic of China. The following year, the Bachelor of Science degree in nursing was initiated. The DSC has developed Articulation Agreements with the University of West Indies, University of Technology, Jamaica, and others within The Caribbean, The United Kingdom and The United States.

Since September 2011, the school's hours of operation has again included evening classes for students pursuing certificate programs, in addition to traditional classes for those pursuing degree programmes.

== Scholarships ==
Under Dominica's tertiary education system, scholarships are offered to talented students and those who need economic assistance, without discrimination, to pursue higher education in educational instructions outside the country.

== Past Presidents ==
Presidents	Years active
Dr. Bernard Yankey	(2003–2005)
Dr. Annette J. Bardouille	(2005–2007)
Hubert Charles	(2007–2010)
Dr. Donald C. Peters	(2010–2023)

== Notable people ==
=== Faculty ===
In 1996, Technical Section of the Clifton Dupigny Community College was directed by Merril J. Matthew, while the Academic Division was directed by Mr. Henry Volney. Early involvement in the transition to DSC included Dr. Hilroy Thomas, Dr. Helen Francis Seaman and Zechariah Pollock, and several members of the Dominica Community who participated in the transition teams. By 2003, when the school had transitioned to be DSC, the president was Dr. Bernard Yankey, the former Organisation of East Caribbean States ambassador to Canada. Dr. Yankey was succeeded by Dr. Annette J. Bardouille who served as president of the College from 2005- 2007. By 2011, Dr. Donald C. Peters succeeded Hubert Charles as President at the end of his term.
