= All Saints University School of Medicine =

Caribbean private medical school

- Type: Private medical school
- Established: 2006
- Location: Roseau, Dominica
- Website: www.allsaintsuniversity.org

All Saints University School of Medicine, Dominica (ASUDOM) is a private medical school located in the Caribbean. The school's campus is in Roseau, Dominica, and is administered from Toronto, Ontario..

== History ==
All Saints University School of Medicine was founded in April 2006. The Roseau campus opened in 2006. The university is listed in the World Directory of Medical Schools and offers Doctor of Medicine (MD) programs to international students. The student body has grown steadily over the past decade and now welcomes hundreds of students. The institution has experienced growth in enrollment over the years, admitting students from multiple countries. In May 2019, its MD program received accreditation from the Accreditation Commission on Colleges of Medicine (ACCM). As of 2024, the program has also been accredited by the Independent Agency for Accreditation and Rating (IAAR), a body recognized by the World Federation for Medical Education. Dr. Terrence Marcelle is currently the Executive Dean of the university.

== Curriculum ==
Medical programs are open to national and international students. Citizens of Dominica automatically receive 50% scholarships.

=== 5 Year MD Program ===
The 5 Year MD Program is designed for recent high school graduates seeking direct admission into the study of medicine. The program consists of 4 semesters of premedical courses, including Biology, General Chemistry, Organic Chemistry, Physics, Mathematics, and Introductory Anatomy. This is followed by the structured curriculum in the 4 Year MD Program.

=== 4 Year MD Program ===
The 4 Year MD Program is for applicants who have completed a Bachelor of Science or the necessary prerequisites at an accredited school. The program consists of 2 years in basic sciences that are conducted at the Dominica campus. This is followed by 2 years of clinical clerkship at ACGME-approved teaching hospitals throughout the United States, Canada, United Kingdom, and the Caribbean. During this period, students must complete a minimum of 72 weeks in clinical rotations. The rotations take place in the fields of Internal Medicine, General Surgery, Pediatrics, Psychiatry, Obstetrics/Gynecology, and Family Practice.

=== Clinical Clerkship ===
Students may complete their clinical rotations at the following affiliated teaching hospitals and other approved medical institutions across the world.

Hospital	Location	ACGME CERTIFIED
St. Mary and Elizabeth Medical Center	Chicago, Illinois	Yes
Jackson Park Hospital	Chicago, Illinois	Yes
Norwegian American Hospital	Chicago, Illinois	Yes
Presence Our Lady of the Resurrection Medical Center	Chicago, Illinois	Yes
Holy Cross, Sinai Health System	Chicago, Illinois	Yes
Swedish General Hospital	Chicago, Illinois	Yes
Baptist Health Little Rock	Little Rock, Arkansas	Yes
United Hospital of Allina Health	Saint Paul, Minnesota	Yes
Kadlec Regional Medical Center	Richland, Washington	Yes
McLaren Bay Regional Hospital	Bay City, Michigan	Yes
Parkview Hospital	Fort Wayne, Indiana	No

== Accreditation ==
The Doctor of Medicine (MD) program at All Saints University School of Medicine was previously accredited by the Accreditation Commission on Colleges of Medicine (ACCM) beginning in 2019.

As of 2024, the university is accredited by the Independent Agency for Accreditation and Rating (IAAR), an accrediting body recognized by the World Federation for Medical Education (WFME)

All Saints University School of Medicine is chartered and recognized by the Government of the Commonwealth of Dominica. The school is authorized to confer degrees in Doctor of Medicine (MD) upon its graduates, allowing eligible candidates to practice medicine in Dominica and overseas. Currently, All Saints University School of Medicine is listed in the International Medical Education Directory (IMED). The institution is also recognized by the Educational Commission for Foreign Medical Graduates (ECFMG), Foundation for Advancement of International Medical Education and Research (FAIMER), and the World Health Organization (WHO).

All Saints University School of Medicine is also on the Canadian Government's List of Designated Educational Institutions.

== See also ==
- List of Medical Schools in the Caribbean
