= Roseau =

Capital and largest city of Dominica

- City
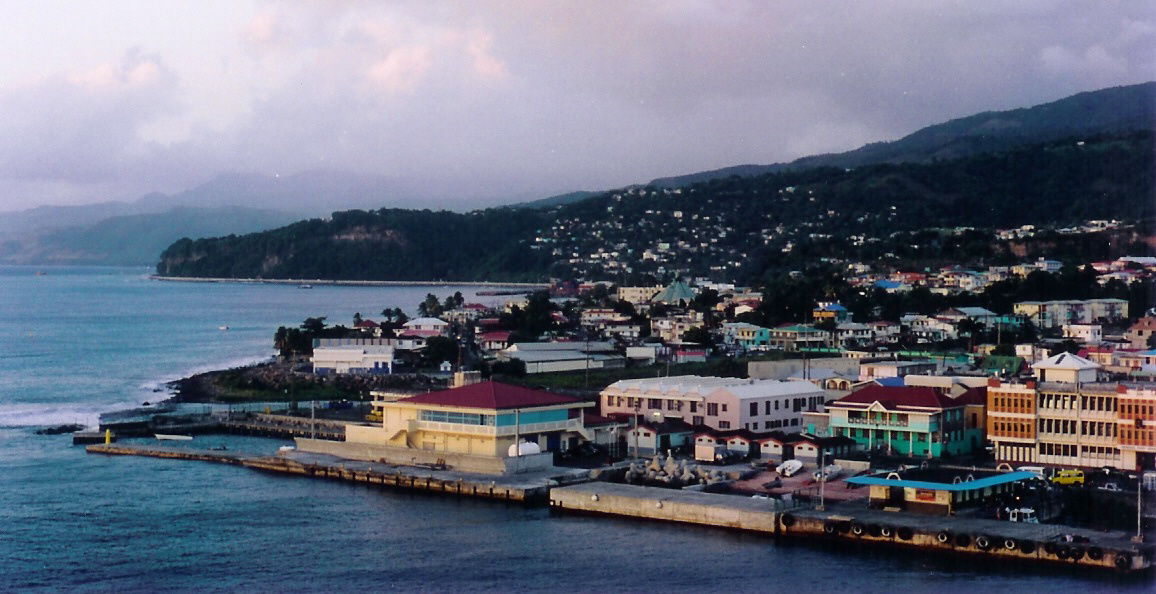
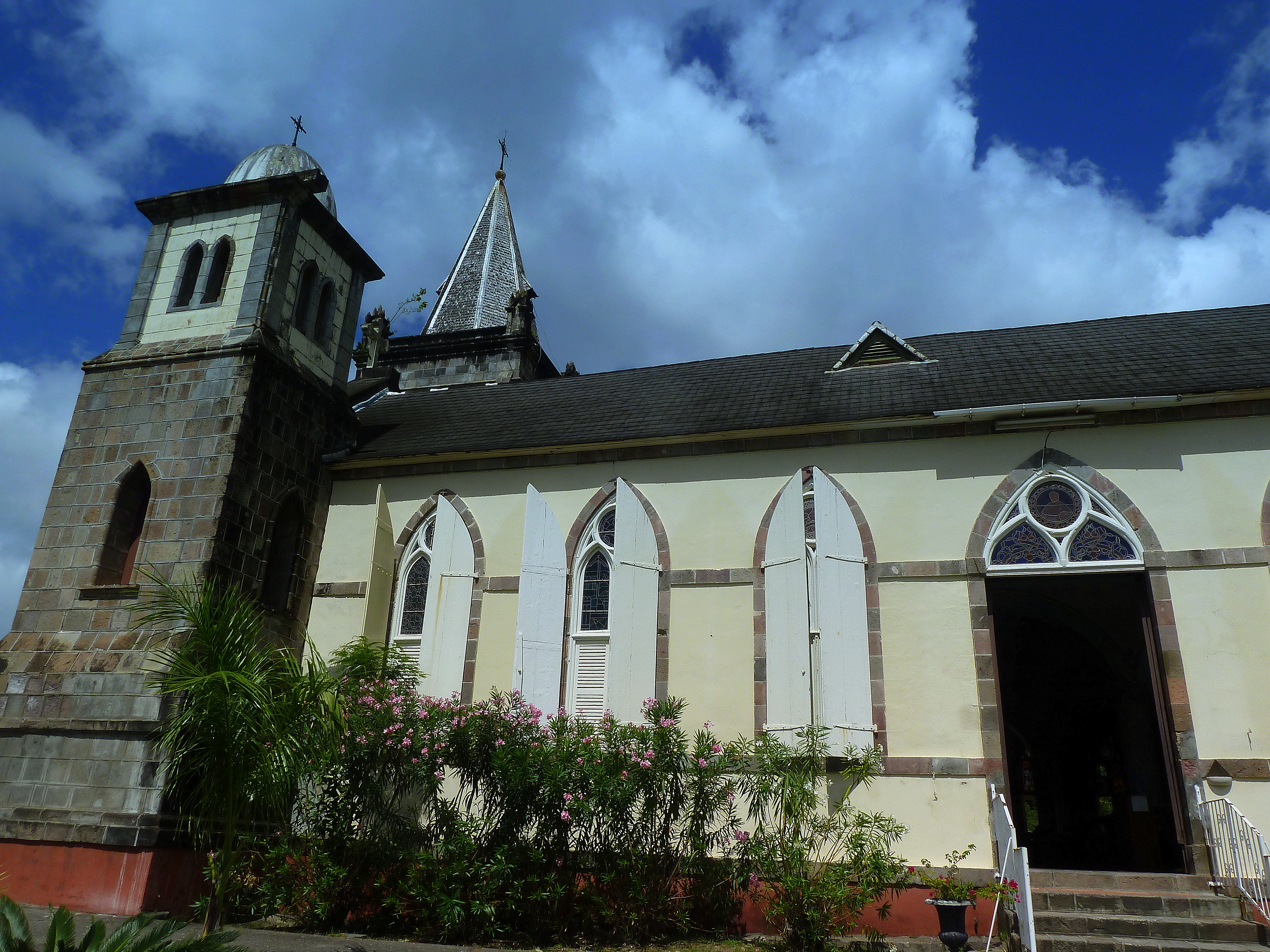
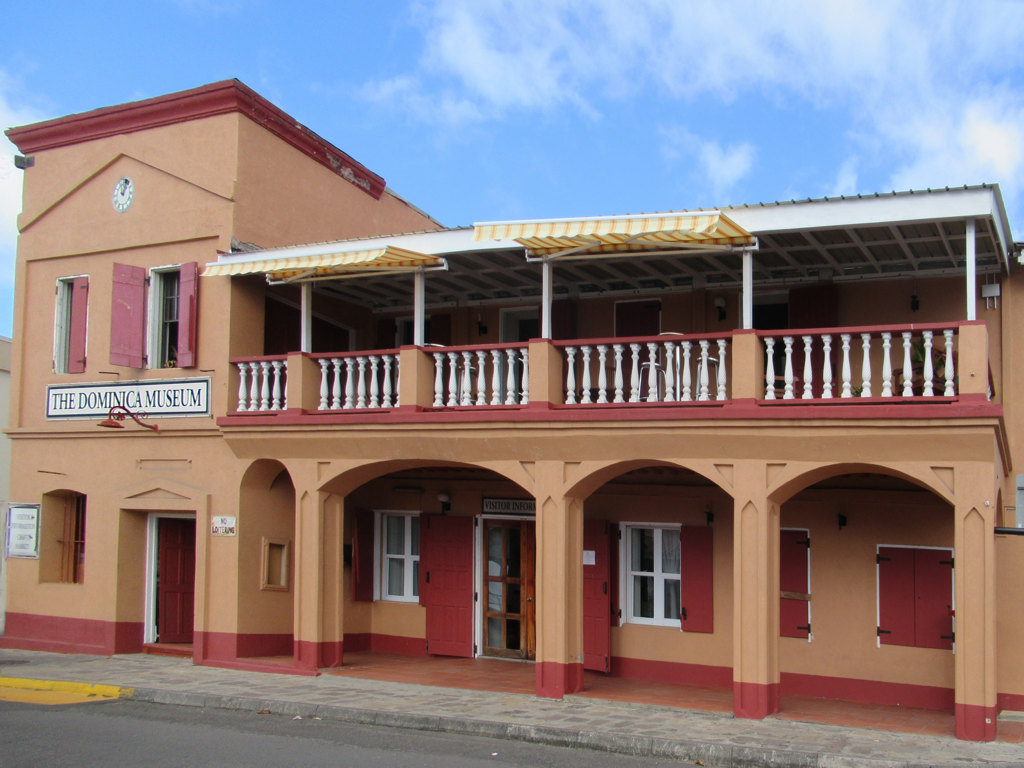
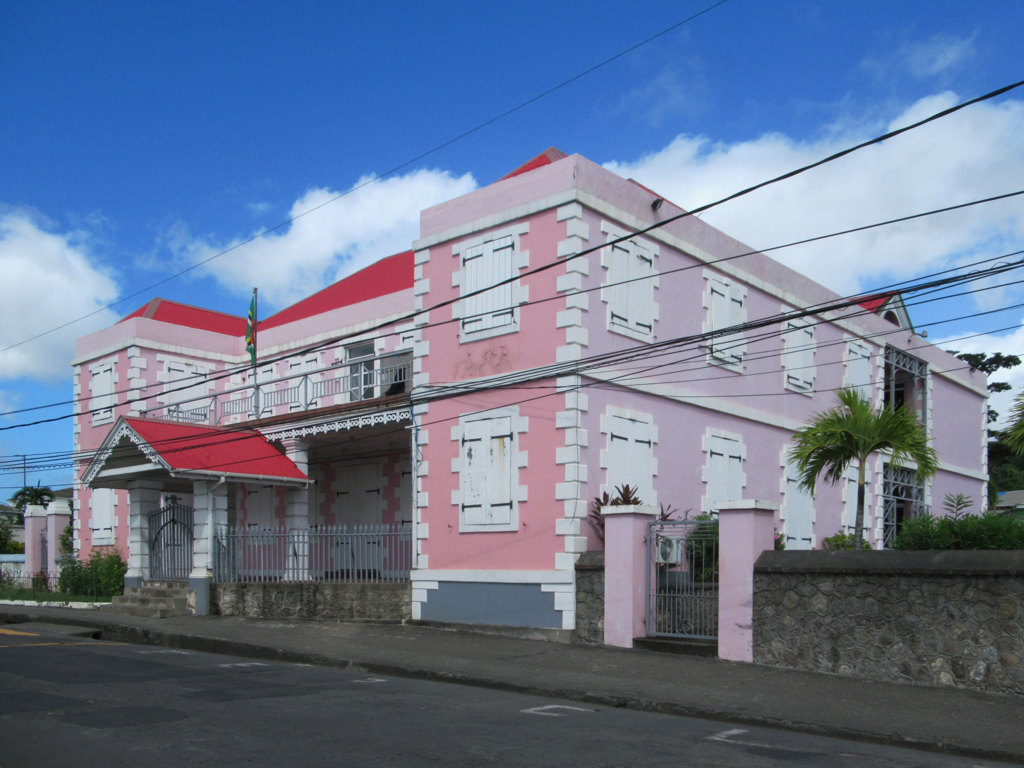
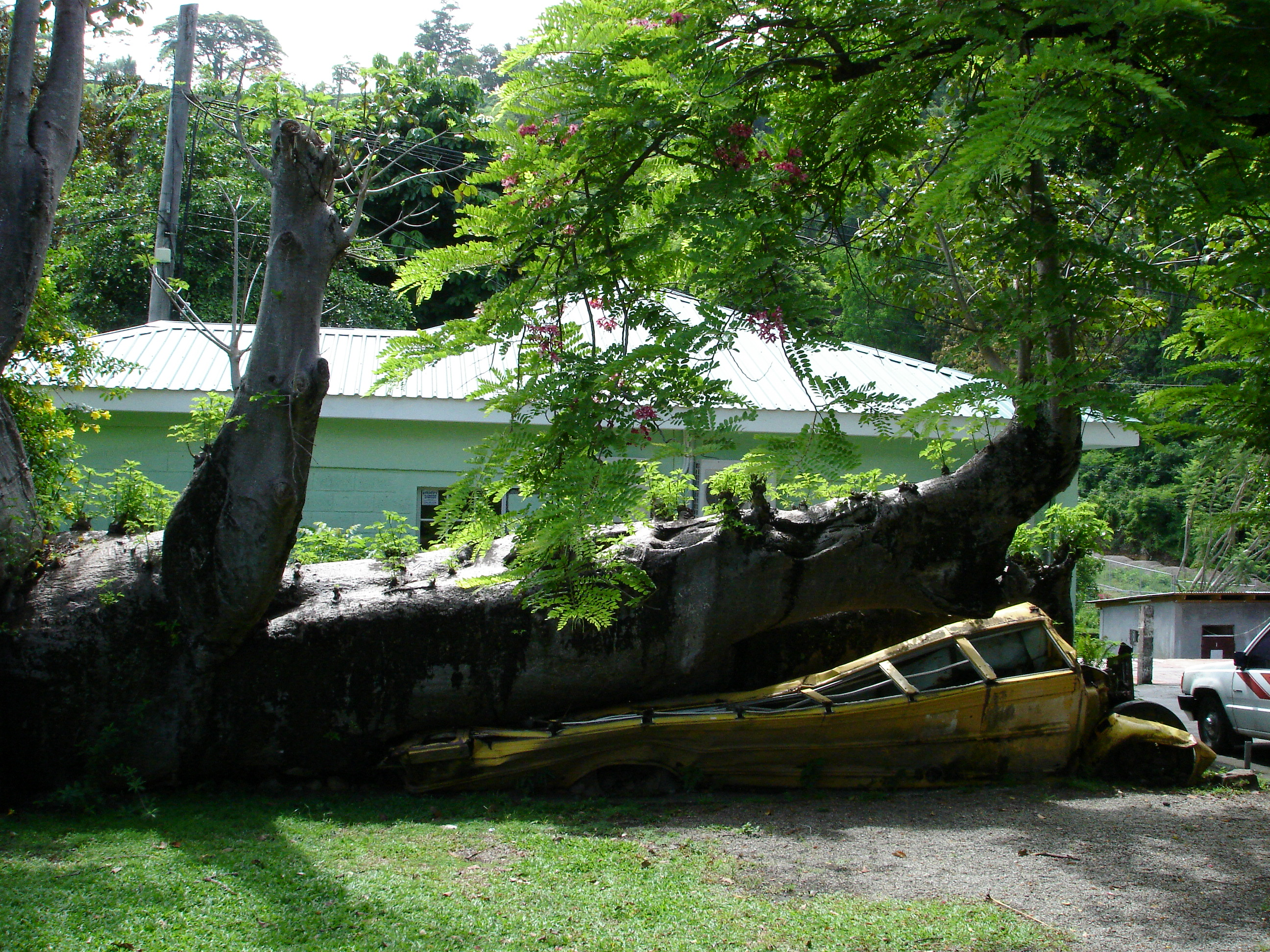
- Top: Roseau skyline; Middle: Cathedral of Our Lady of Fair Haven of Roseau, Dominica Museum; Bottom: Dominica Parliament House, Dominica Botanical Gardens

- Location within Dominica Location within North America
- Coordinates: 15°18′33″N 61°22′45″W
- Country: Dominica
- Parish: Saint George

Government
  - Type: Local government: Roseau City Council established 1890s
  - His Worship Mayor: Cecil Joseph
  - MP – Roseau Central: Hon. Norris Prevost

Area
  - Total: 2.1 sq mi (5.4 km^{2})
- Elevation: 141 ft (43 m)

Population (2011)
  - Total: 14,725
  - Density: 7,100/sq mi (2,700/km^{2})
- Time zone: UTC−04:00 (AST)
- Area code: +1 767

Roseau (locally /rəʊˈzəʊ/; Dominican Creole: Wozo) is the capital and largest city of Dominica, with a population of 14,725 as of 2011. It is a small and compact urban settlement, in the Saint George parish and surrounded by the Caribbean Sea, the Roseau River and Morne Bruce. Built on the site of the ancient Island Carib village of Sairi, it is the oldest and most important urban settlement on the island of Dominica.

It is on the west (leeward) coast of Dominica and has a combination of modern and colonial French architecture.

Roseau is Dominica's most important port for foreign trade. Some exports include bananas, bay oil, vegetables, grapefruit, oranges, and cocoa. The service sector is also a large part of the local economy. There are several private institutions registered in Dominica, like American Canadian School of Medicine, International University for Graduate Studies, All Saints University, New World University, and Western Orthodox University.

== History ==
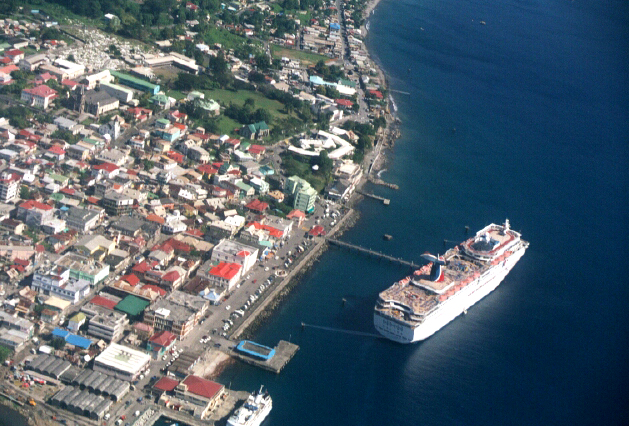
Aerial photo of Roseau

The city of Roseau sits on an alluvial fan formed hundreds of years ago as the Roseau River meandered across the area from what is now known as Newtown to its current location. Over the last 2,000 years, Amerindians migrating through the islands settled the area attracted by the nearby river. With the arrival of the Europeans in the 16th and 17th centuries, a small settlement was established by the French who, in their tradition of naming places after what they found there, used their name for the river reeds (called roseaux in French), that grew abundantly along its banks. A plan was created for the settlement that mirrored examples in France where streets extended from a central point – what is today the Old Market – and spread out to the rest of the settlement.

Conflict raged between the French and the British over the area on several occasions. In 1699, the French built a fort to protect Roseau. In 1770, the British built Fort Young in place of the previous fort. In 1778, the French invaded Dominica, capturing Fort Young and Roseau and taking control of the island. In 1784, Dominica was returned to British control under the Treaty of Paris. The population of Roseau, in the census of June 1844, was 3,954.

By the late 18th and early 19th centuries, the British set out plans for the city that included fortifications and government structures, the grid street system, and blocks and new urban areas to the north and south, known today as Potter's Ville and Newtown. Goodwill was established in the 1950s and Bath Estate in the early 1980s. Since then several new semi-urban settlements – such as Stock Farm, Castle Comfort, and Wall House – have been constructed around the existing ones. Some older settlements like Fond Cole and Canefield nowadays belong to the semi-urban area around Roseau.

The French influence can still be seen today, however, in its architecture and crooked streets that extend from the Old Market Plaza. Examples of the English influence are evident in architecture and street names.

== Scenery ==
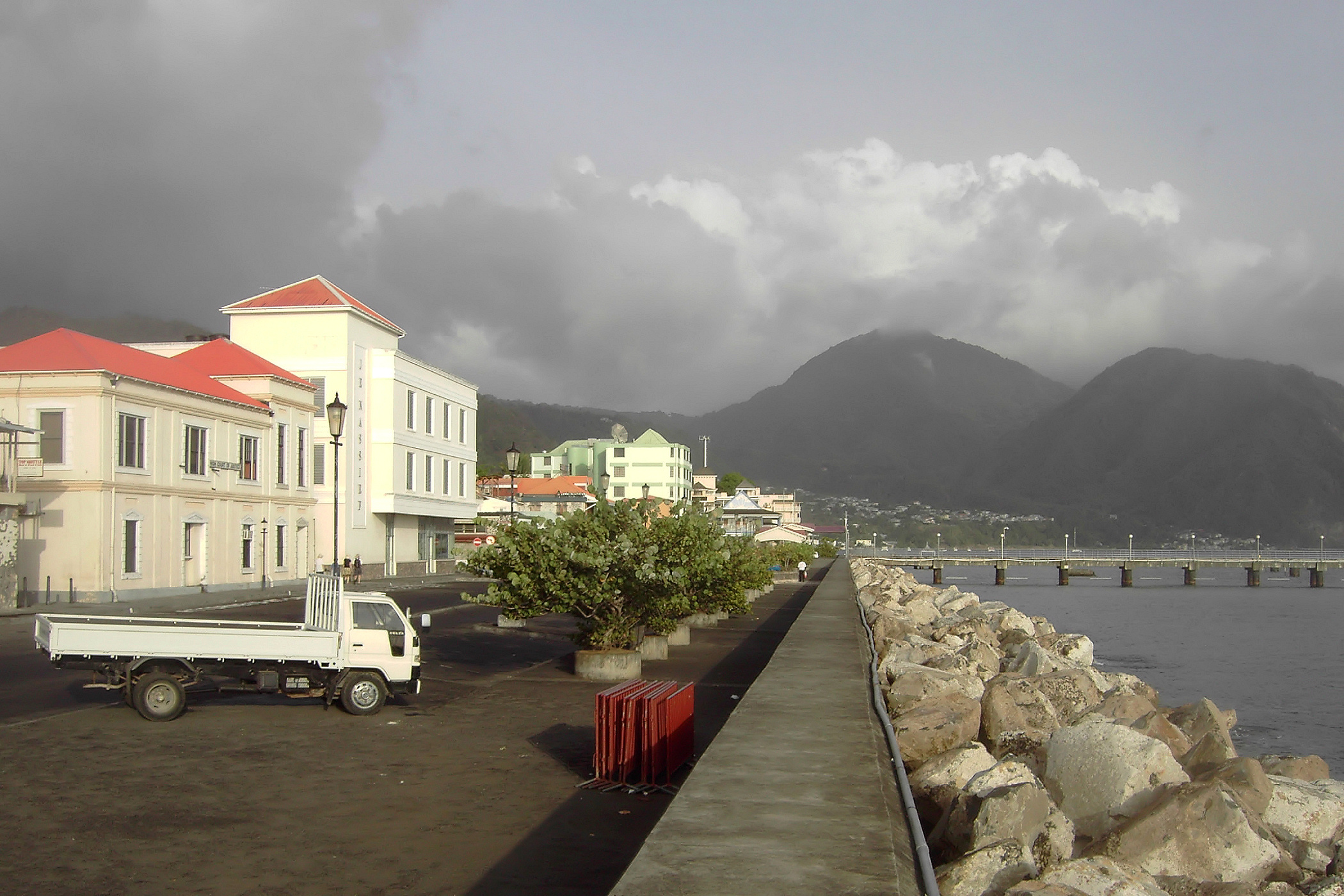
Roseau's Bay Front area

Roseau's nearby scenery (mostly in its so-called valley) includes Boiling Lake, 10.5 km (6.5 mi) east, in the Morne Trois Pitons National Park, waterfalls, thermal springs, and scenic plateaus.

Morne Bruce provides panoramic views of most of downtown Roseau and north toward Woodbridge Bay deepwater port and Fond Cole. From Morne Bruce there are views of the Botanic Gardens at its base as well as the Caribbean Sea which frequently has cruise liners present.

== Climate ==
Roseau's climate is a tropical monsoon climate, featuring relatively constant temperatures throughout the year with average high temperatures generally between 28 and 31 °C (82.4 and 87.8 °F) and average low temperatures between 19 and 23 °C (66.2 and 73.4 °F). Rainfall is common throughout the year, with the city seeing an annual average nearly 1,800 millimetres or 70 inches. Roseau features a noticeably drier stretch from February through April, though each of these months on average sees at least 45 millimetres or 1.8 inches of rain.

Climate data for Roseau (Canefield Airport) 1982-2011
Month	Jan	Feb	Mar	Apr	May	Jun	Jul	Aug	Sep	Oct	Nov	Dec	Year
Record high °C (°F)	33 (91)	34 (93)	36 (97)	36 (97)	36 (97)	36 (97)	35 (95)	35 (95)	36.3 (97.3)	37 (99)	35 (95)	34 (93)	37 (99)
Mean daily maximum °C (°F)	29.5 (85.1)	29.5 (85.1)	30.1 (86.2)	30.9 (87.6)	31.8 (89.2)	31.8 (89.2)	31.5 (88.7)	31.8 (89.2)	31.7 (89.1)	31.5 (88.7)	31.1 (88.0)	30.2 (86.4)	31.0 (87.7)
Daily mean °C (°F)	25.7 (78.3)	25.6 (78.1)	26.1 (79.0)	26.9 (80.4)	27.8 (82.0)	28.1 (82.6)	28.0 (82.4)	28.0 (82.4)	27.9 (82.2)	27.6 (81.7)	27.1 (80.8)	26.2 (79.2)	27.1 (80.8)
Mean daily minimum °C (°F)	21.8 (71.2)	21.6 (70.9)	22.0 (71.6)	22.9 (73.2)	23.9 (75.0)	24.5 (76.1)	24.5 (76.1)	24.2 (75.6)	23.9 (75.0)	23.7 (74.7)	23.2 (73.8)	22.3 (72.1)	23.2 (73.8)
Record low °C (°F)	16 (61)	17 (63)	17 (63)	18 (64)	19 (66)	20 (68)	21 (70)	21 (70)	20 (68)	18 (64)	18 (64)	17 (63)	16 (61)
Average rainfall mm (inches)	108.3 (4.26)	62.1 (2.44)	49.0 (1.93)	54.8 (2.16)	92.0 (3.62)	159.5 (6.28)	251.4 (9.90)	244.3 (9.62)	253.7 (9.99)	188.2 (7.41)	194.2 (7.65)	102.2 (4.02)	1,759.7 (69.28)
Average relative humidity (%)	71	68	65	64	64	67	72	73	71	73	74	72	70
Mean monthly sunshine hours	198.9	200.6	227.3	244.9	243.2	227.7	231.2	240.4	212.2	219.5	194.0	189.5	2,629.4
Source 1: Dominica Meteorological Services
Source 2: NOAA (sun 1961–1990), BBC Weather

== Architecture ==
The central district of Roseau is tightly packed with small and large houses and even larger modern concrete structures. There is little green or open space in the city; there is even less today, as many of the courtyards that were once commonplace are giving way to office space. The district is, however, framed in every direction by natural elements. The sea and the river provide water elements while the Botanical gardens and the Government House gardens frame the city with green space. These elements are rare in the Caribbean. No other centre in the region has such extensive botanical gardens with such central location, and the Roseau River is among the largest that flow through any Caribbean capital.

The urban structure of Central Roseau is based on an irregular grid system of miniature proportions, making it a highly illegible city. Even though the grid area is not extensive, it is relatively easy for a visitor to get lost. The grid area has some 80 blocks in an area of 30 hectares (74 acres). In comparison, the grid areas of Kingstown and Castries — capitals of Saint Vincent and Saint Lucia — have some 50 and 60 blocks in the areas of over 40 hectares (99 acres). The average block size in Central Roseau is thus some ⅓ hectare (1 acre), i.e., about half of the figure of Central Kingstown.

There are some fine examples of West Indian architecture in Roseau. The ones that stand out the most are the French Colonial style and the vernacular form. Much of the French influence can be found along King George V Street. Around the city there are good examples of the English influence in large colonial town houses and colonial public/government buildings.

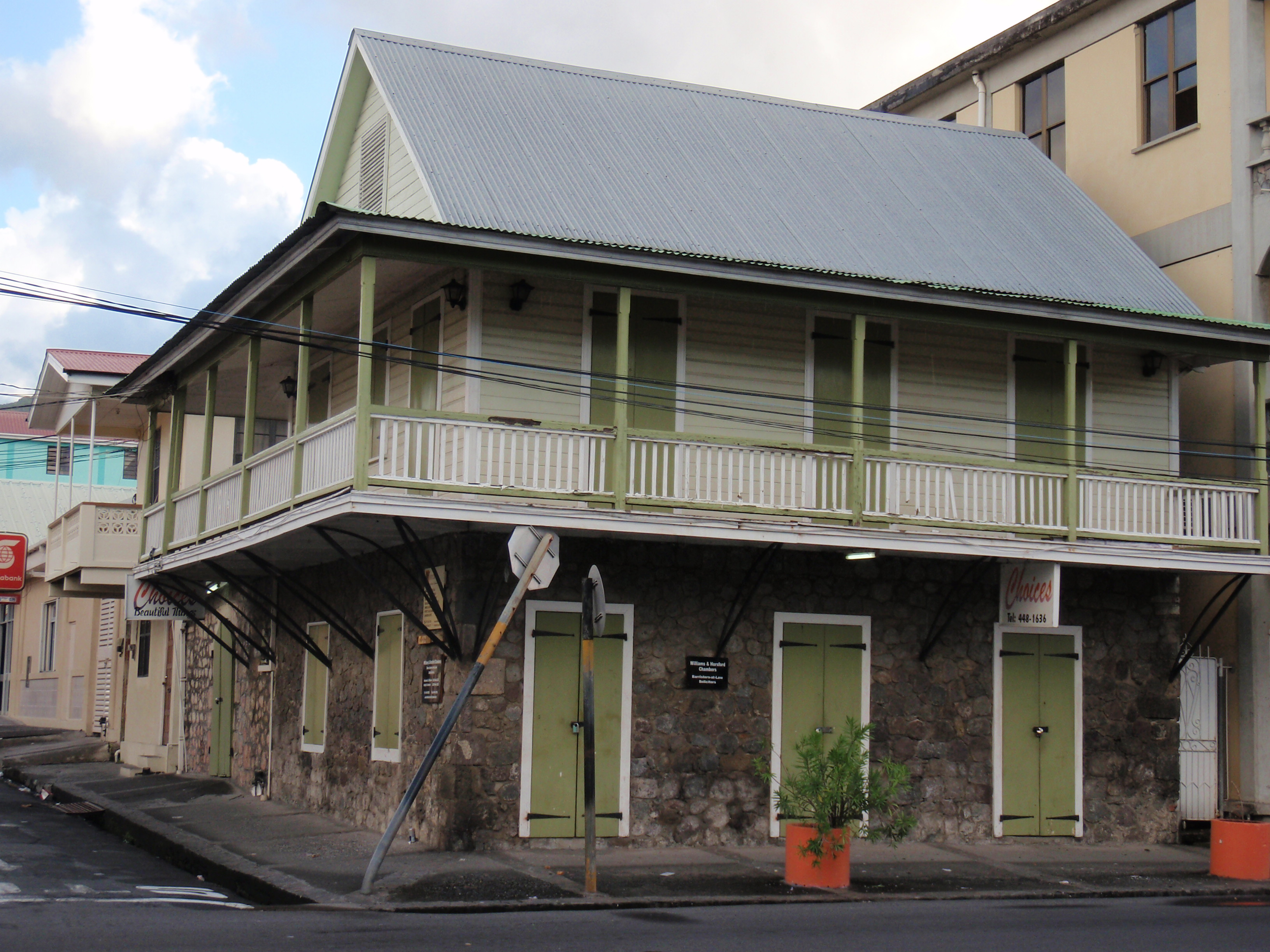
Roseau's French Quarter

== Religion ==
The churches in Roseau are fine examples of Europe in Dominica with a bit of creolization. The Roman Catholic Cathedral stands prominent in Gothic Romanesque revival and the Anglican Church on Victoria Street in Georgian style. The Roman Catholic Diocese of Roseau covers the whole island of Dominica.

== City life ==
Video showing activity at Farmers Market in downtown Roseau

Because of the suburban sprawl, few people live in Central Roseau, but more of them commute daily. Motorized vehicles pour into the central district introducing a mode of point-to-point interaction in an environment that was created for multiple use. As elders said, first there were no streets but just a space between the buildings. The streets of Roseau, and especially those of its central district, are not only ways to move from place to place but they are places themselves. They are used as gardens, playing fields, and social meeting places.

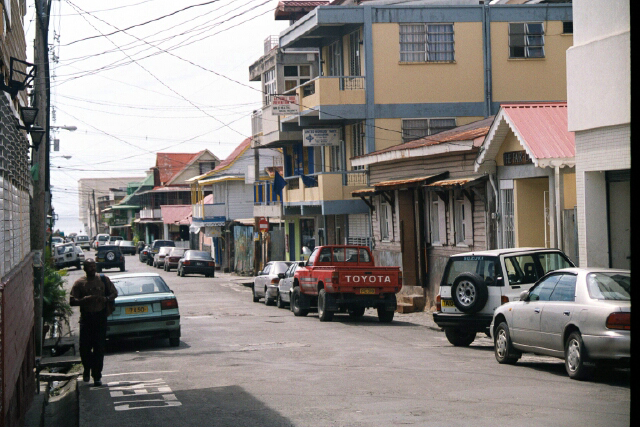
Street scene in Roseau

The Botanical Gardens on the fringes of the central district are mostly used by children.

== Sports and recreation ==
In Roseau, there are many opportunities for recreation. Many people seek the tranquility and cool of the Botanical Gardens as a getaway on Sunday afternoons and at lunch. It is a popular venue for local cricket matches and sports training. Football is popular; there are several pitches throughout the city (at Newtown, Potters Ville, and Bath Estate), as well as in the sports stadium at Windsor Park.

=== Sporting facilities and infrastructure ===
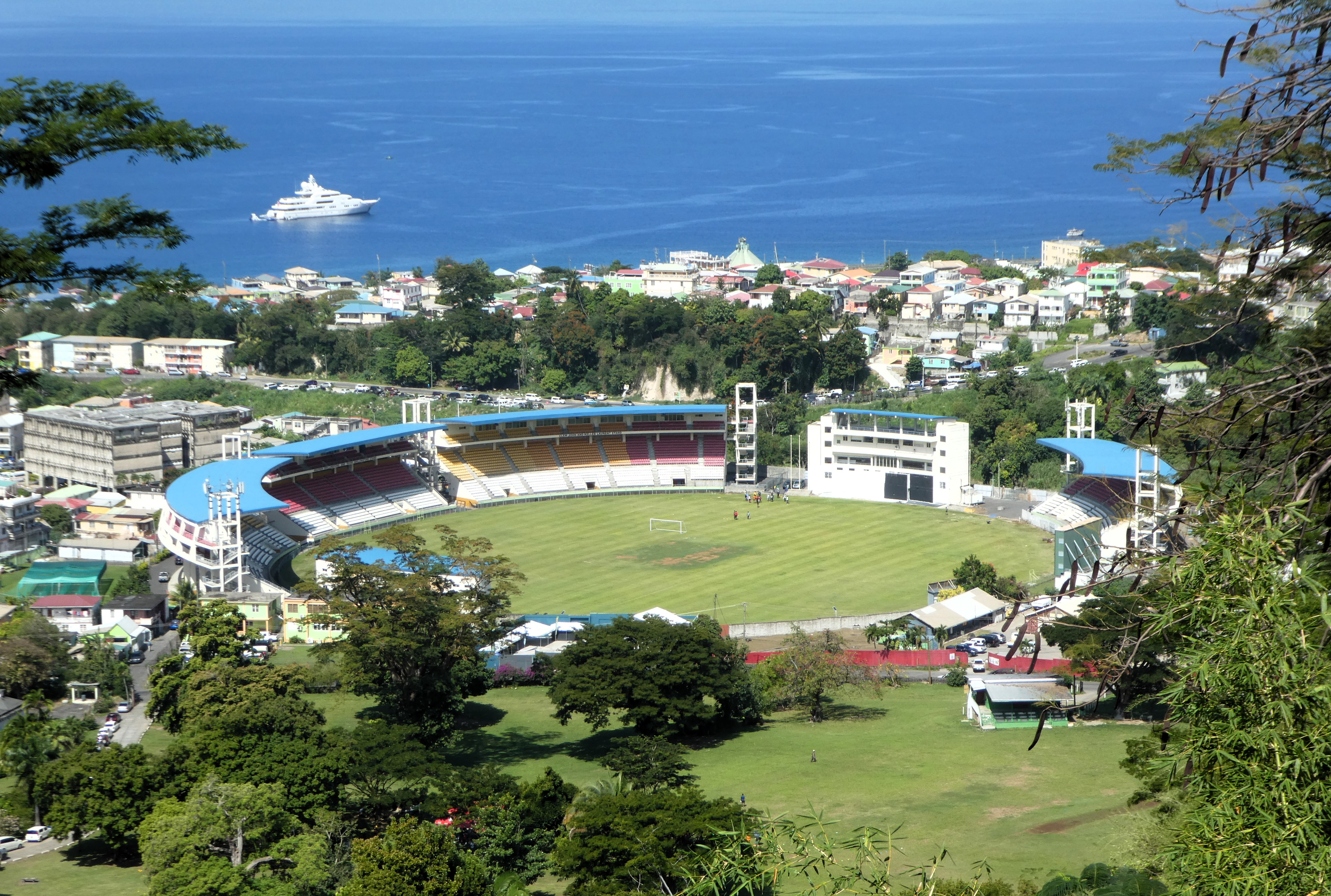
Windsor Park

There are dedicated sports facilities around the city. Private tennis courts are on High Street; netball and basketball courts abound in the major high schools. These are complemented by community facilities at Goodwill. A dedicated netball and basketball stadium is at Stockfarm near the Dominica State College.

In 2007, Windsor Park, a cricket stadium which is also home to the Dominica national football team, was completed with a donation of EC$33 million from the government of the People's Republic of China.

Elsewhere it is not uncommon to find that a section of the street, sidewalk or the beach has been adapted for makeshift games of cricket or football.

Other popular sports include netball, basketball, rounders and (to a much lesser extent) tennis.

== Accommodations and infrastructure ==
There are no world-famous hotel chains in the city. The most famous is the Fort Young Hotel. In addition there are several small family owned establishments in and on the outskirts of Roseau.

Dominica Broadcasting Corporation, the national radio station, and two private radio stations are in the capital.

== Non-governmental organizations ==
Roseau is home to service clubs including, Kiwanis, Rotary and Lions. There are other organizations such as the local humane society and conservation society. ChildFund International USA has an office in Roseau from where it runs its child centered development programs for Dominica and Saint Vincent.

The Dominica Association of Industry and Commerce, Waitukubuli Ecological Foundation, Dominica Tourism Association and others are based in the city.

The city is home to several labour organizations including the Dominica Amalgamated Workers' Union, the Dominica Public Service Union, the Dominica Trade Union, the National Workers' Union and the Waterfront and Allied Workers' Union.

== Transportation ==
As the most important town on the island and hub of all business activity, the city is a central point of the road networks on the island. It is an important link between northern, eastern, and southern bound traffic.

Roseau is served by Canefield Airport, a nearby small aircraft airport that provides direct links to nearby islands, as well as the larger Douglas–Charles Airport to the north. The ferry terminal provides direct links to the neighbouring Guadeloupe to the north and Martinique and St. Lucia to the south.

There are no rail or subway systems.

== Education ==
Roseau has been the historical centre of education on the island. There are six secondary schools in the city as well as eight primary schools. A community college, the Dominica State College, is in Roseau. There are two private medical schools, All Saints School of Medicine and American Canadian School of Medicine, and a private university, Western Orthodox University.

== Embassies and consulates ==
Several embassies are in the city. They include the Brazilian, the Chinese, the Cuban, and the Venezuelan embassies, with a couple of other consulates around the city.

== Notable people ==
- Dominica's most famous writer and novelist, Jean Rhys, was born in Roseau on 24 August 1890.
- NBA basketball player Garth Joseph was born in the town on 8 August 1973.
- Dame Mary Eugenia Charles, former prime minister and the first woman prime minister in the Caribbean, was instrumental in the development of the Organisation of Eastern Caribbean States and in the US invasion of Grenada in the 1980s.
- Clarissa Burton Cumbo (1903–1988), New York arts patron, was born in Roseau.
- Gordon Henderson of the cadence-lypso band Exile One.
- Henry Wilcoxon, film actor, was born in Roseau in 1905.
- Prince Ital Joe, musician, was born in Roseau in 1963.
- Alwin Bully, cultural administrator, playwright, actor and artist, was born in and died in Roseau.

== Image gallery ==
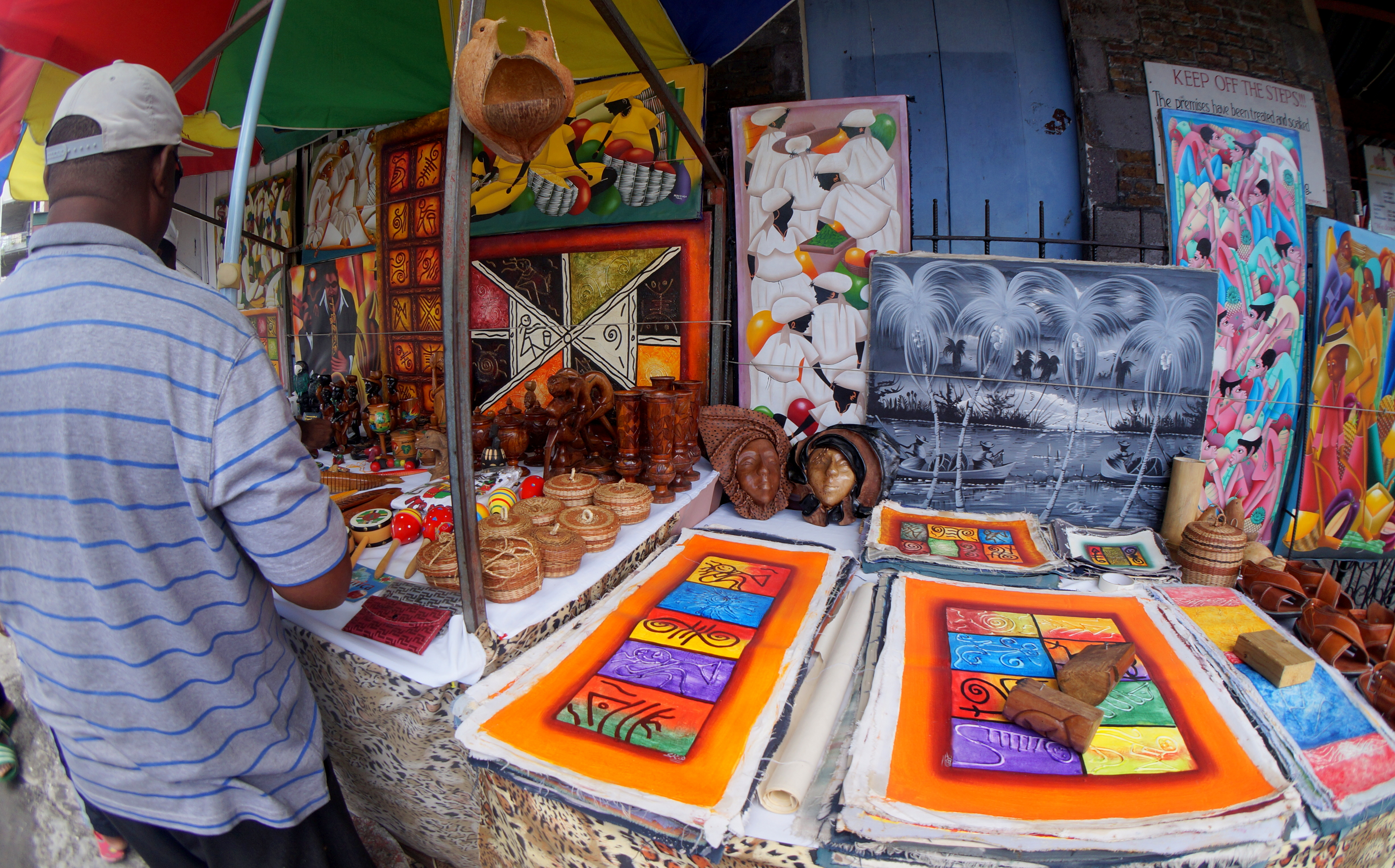
A craft vendor in Roseau

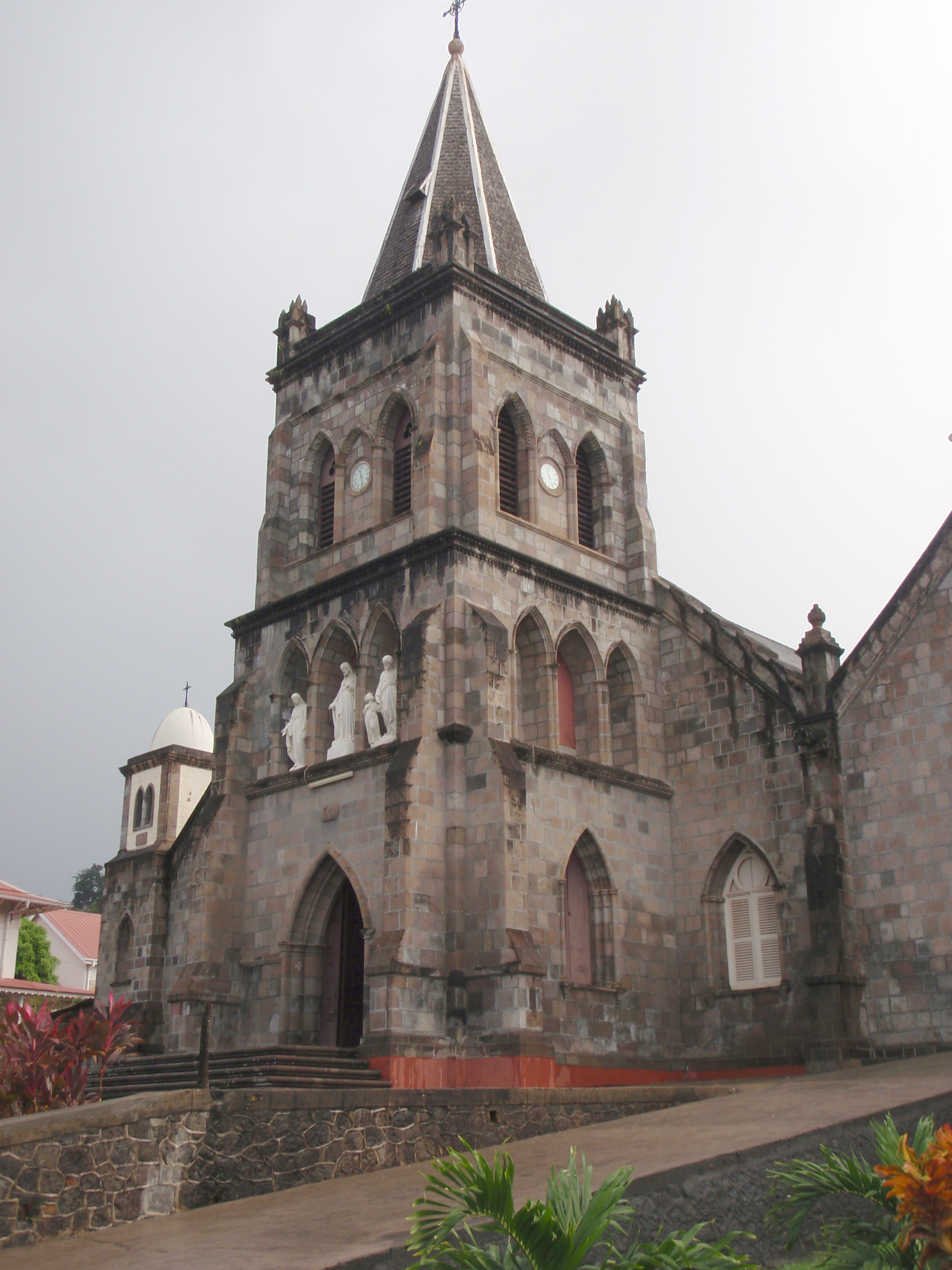
Roseau Cathedral

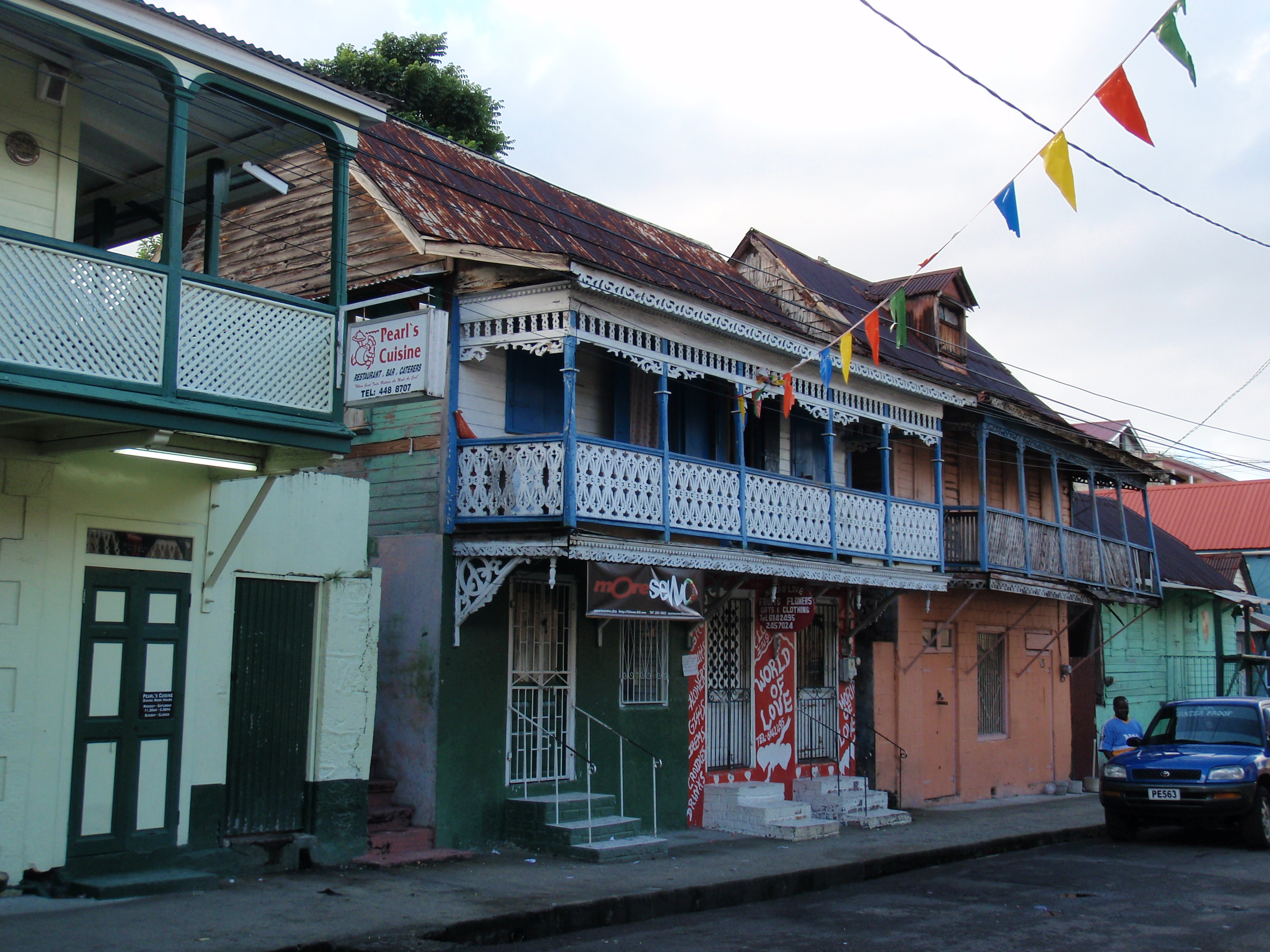
Roseau in the morning

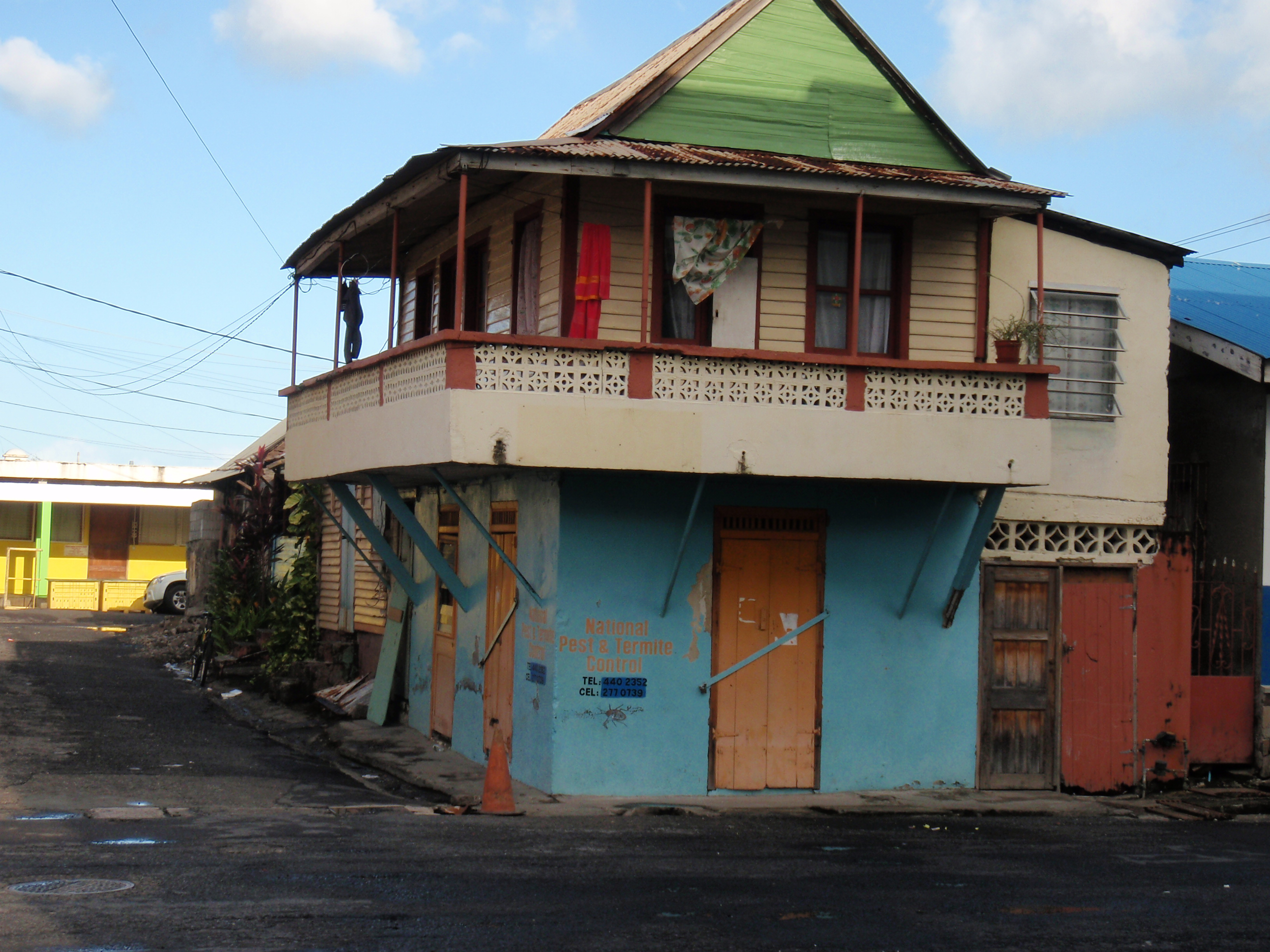
Roseau in the morning

== See also ==
- Canefield Airport
