= Politics of Dominica =

The politics of Dominica takes place in a framework of a parliamentary representative democratic republic, whereby the Prime Minister of Dominica is the head of government, and of a multi-party system. Executive power is exercised by the government. Legislative power is vested in both the government and the House of Assembly. The Judiciary is independent of the executive and the legislature.

== Executive branch ==
Main office-holders
Office	Name	Party	Since
President	Sylvanie Burton	Labour Party	2 October 2023
Prime Minister	Roosevelt Skerritt	Labour Party	8 January 2004

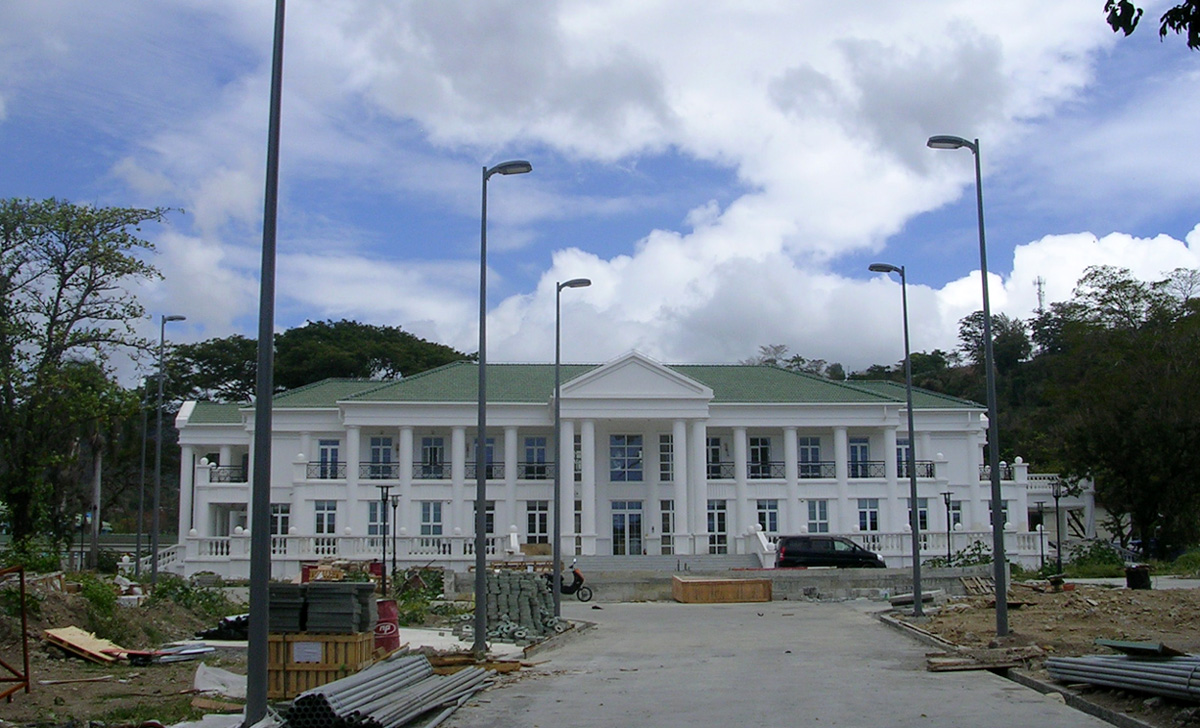
Government House, Dominica

A president and prime minister make up the executive branch. Nominated by the prime minister in consultation with the leader of the opposition party, the president is elected for a five-year term by the parliament. The president appoints as prime minister the person who command the majority of elected representatives in the parliament and also appoints, on the prime minister's recommendation, members of the parliament as cabinet ministers. The prime minister and cabinet are responsible to the parliament and can be removed on a no-confidence vote.

== Legislative branch ==
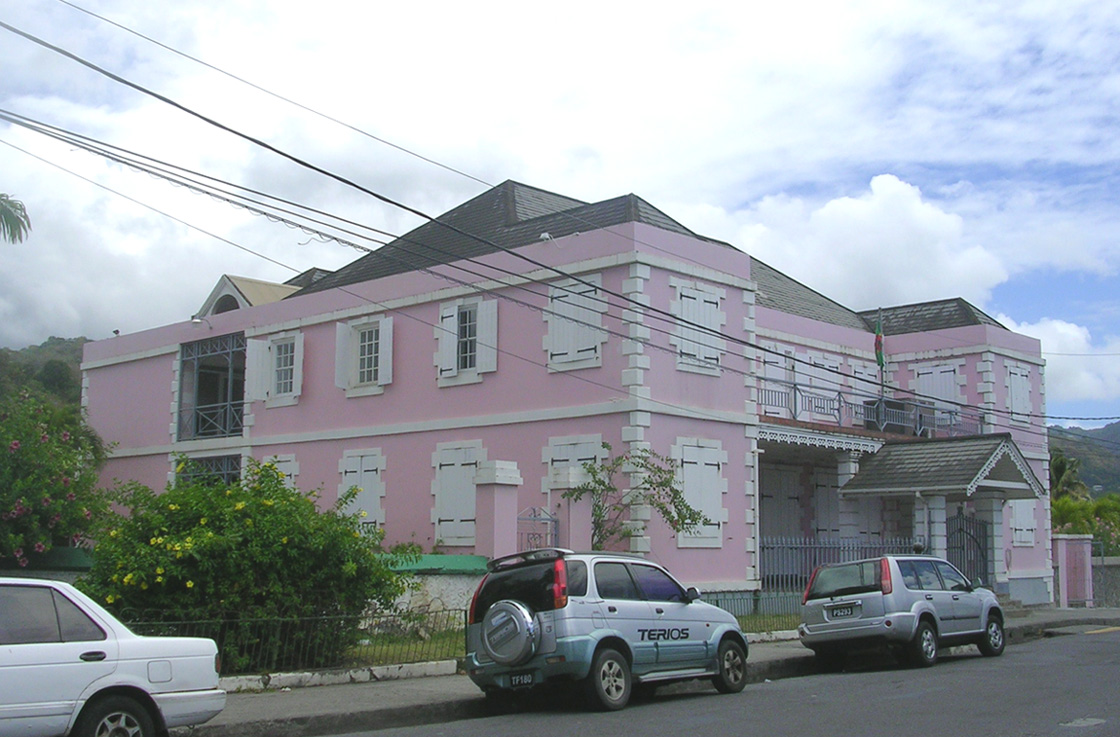
House of Assembly of Dominica

The House of Assembly has 32 members. Twenty-one members are elected for a five-year term in single-seat constituencies. Nine members are senators appointed by the President; five on the advice of the Prime Minister and four on the advice of the leader of the opposition. The Speaker is elected by the elected members after an election. There is also one ex officio member, the clerk of the house. The head of state – the president – is elected by the House of Assembly. The regional representatives decide whether senators are to be elected or appointed. If appointed, five are chosen by the president with the advice of the prime minister and four with the advice of the opposition leader. If elected, it is by vote of the regional representatives. Elections for representatives and senators must be held at least every five years, although the prime minister can call elections at any time.

Dominica has a two-party system, which means that there are two dominant political parties, with extreme difficulty for anybody to achieve electoral success under the banner of any other party. Dominica was once a three-party system, but in the past few years the Dominica Labour Party and the greatly diminished Dominica Freedom Party have built a coalition.

== Judicial branch ==
Dominica's legal system is based on English common law. There are three magistrate's courts and a High Court of Justice. Appeals can be made to the Eastern Caribbean Court of Appeal and, ultimately, to the Caribbean Court of Justice.

The Court of Appeal of the Eastern Caribbean Supreme Court is headquartered in Saint Lucia, but at least one of its 16 High Court judges must reside in Dominica and preside over the High Court of Justice. Dominica's current High Court judges are The Hon. Brian Cottle and The Hon. M. E. Birnie Stephenson-Brooks.

== Administrative divisions ==
Councils elected by universal suffrage govern most towns. Supported largely by property taxation, the councils are responsible for the regulation of markets and sanitation and the maintenance of secondary roads and other municipal amenities. The island also is divided into 10 parishes, whose governance is unrelated to the town governments: Saint Andrew, Saint David, Saint George, Saint John, Saint Joseph, Saint Luke, Saint Mark, Saint Patrick, Saint Paul, and Saint Peter.

== International organization participation ==
- ACP
- ALBA
- Caricom
- CDB
- CELAC
- Commonwealth of Nations
- ECLAC
- FAO
- G-77
- IBRD
- ICC
- ICRM
- IDA
- IFAD
- IFC
- IFRCS
- ILO
- IMF
- IMO
- Interpol
- IOC
- ITU
- ITUC
- NAM (observer)
- OAS
- OIF
- OECS
- OPANAL
- OPCW
- UN
- UNCTAD
- UNESCO
- UNIDO
- UPU
- WHO
- WIPO
- WMO
- WTO
