= Demographics of Dominica =

This is a demography of the population of Dominica including population density, ethnicity, religious affiliations and other aspects of the population.

Census population and average annual growth rate
Year	Pop.	±% p.a.
1844	22,649	—
1871	27,178	+0.68%
1871	27,178	+0.00%
1881	28,211	+0.37%
1891	26,841	−0.50%
1901	28,894	+0.74%
1911	33,863	+1.60%
1921	37,059	+0.91%
1946	47,624	+1.01%
1960	59,916	+1.65%
1970	69,549	+1.50%
1981	73,795	+0.54%
1991	71,183	−0.36%
2001	71,242	+0.01%
2011	69,325	−0.27%
2026	65,511	−0.38%

== Population size and structure ==
As of 2026, Dominica’s estimated population is 65,511. In 2011, Dominica’s official census count was 71,293. Low population growth is due primarily to emigration to more prosperous Caribbean Islands, the United Kingdom, the United States, Canada, and Australia.

=== Population by parishes ===
Name	Population	Percentage of national population	Total area (km^{2})	Population density
Saint Andrew	10,461	14.77%	178.27	59
Saint David	6,789	9.58%	131.6	52
Saint George	20,211	28.54%	56.1	360
Saint John	5,897	8.33%	59	100
Saint Joseph	5,765	8.14%	120.1	48
Saint Luke	1,576	2.22%	7.77	203
Saint Mark	1,891	2.67%	9.9	191
Saint Patrick	8,383	11.84%	84.4	99
Saint Paul	8,397	11.86%	67.4	125
Saint Peter	1,452	2.05%	27.7	52
Dominica	70,822	100%	742.24	105

=== Structure of the population ===
Population Estimates by Sex and Age Group (31.XII.2006):

Age group	Male	Female	Total	%
Total	36 638	34 942	71 180	100
0–4	3 250	3 067	6 317	8.87
5–9	3 951	3 603	7 554	10.61
10–14	3 558	3 547	7 105	9.98
15–19	3 452	3 366	6 818	9.58
20–24	2 438	2 140	4 578	6.43
25–29	2 601	2 520	5 121	7.19
30–34	2 886	2 777	5 663	7.96
35–39	2 841	2 455	5 296	7.44
40–44	2 417	2 059	4 476	6.29
45–49	1 947	1 614	3 561	5.00
50–54	1 467	1 353	2 820	3.96
55–59	1 209	1 182	2 391	3.36
60–64	1 022	1 233	2 255	3.17
65–69	1 091	1 233	2 324	3.26
70–74	871	973	1 844	2.59
75–79	596	736	1 332	1.87
80–84	354	547	901	1.27
85+	288	537	825	1.16
Age group	Male	Female	Total	Percent
0–14	10 759	10 217	20 976	29.47
15–64	22 279	20 699	42 978	60.38
65+	3 200	4 026	7 226	10.15

Population by Sex and Age Group (Census 14.V.2011):

Age group	Male	Female	Total	%
Total	34 973	33 940	68 913	100
0–4	3 240	3 140	6 380	9.26
5–9	2 601	2 495	5 096	7.39
10–14	2 946	2 876	5 822	8.45
15–19	3 237	3 060	6 297	9.14
20–24	2 691	2 567	5 258	7.63
25–29	2 389	2 472	4 861	7.05
30–34	2 118	1 911	4 029	5.85
35–39	2 271	2 236	4 507	6.54
40–44	2 544	2 409	4 953	7.19
45–49	2 337	2 135	4 472	6.49
50–54	2 162	1 784	3 946	5.73
55–59	1 682	1 411	3 093	4.49
60–64	1 281	1 212	2 493	3.62
65–69	1 054	1 105	2 159	3.13
70–74	884	983	1 867	2.71
75–79	724	863	1 587	2.30
80–84	467	635	1 102	1.60
85–89	212	387	599	0.87
90–94	101	173	274	0.40
95+	32	86	118	0.17
Age group	Male	Female	Total	Percent
0–14	8 787	8 511	17 298	25.10
15–64	22 712	21 197	43 909	63.72
65+	3 474	4 232	7 706	11.18

== Vital statistics ==
	Average population	Live births	Deaths	Natural change	Crude birth rate (per 1000)	Crude death rate (per 1000)	Natural change (per 1000)	Total fertility rate	Infant mortality rate
1950	51,000	1,848	948	900	36.2	18.6	17.6		
1951	52,000	1,965	874	1,091	38.0	16.9	21.1		
1952	52,000	2,091	1,108	983	40.0	21.2	18.8		
1953	53,000	2,080	779	1,301	39.3	14.7	24.6		
1954	54,000	2,345	759	1,586	43.7	14.1	29.5		
1955	55,000	2,543	870	1,673	46.6	15.9	30.7		
1956	56,000	2,416	927	1,489	43.5	16.7	26.8		
1957	57,000	2,557	870	1,687	45.2	15.4	29.8		
1958	58,000	2,724	929	1,795	47.1	16.1	31.1		
1959	59,000	2,770	826	1,944	47.0	14.0	33.0		
1960	60,000	2,812	922	1,890	46.9	15.4	31.5		
1961	61,000	2,655	799	1,856	43.5	13.1	30.4		
1962	62,000	2,566	658	1,908	41.4	10.6	30.8		
1963	63,000	2,493	835	1,658	39.6	13.3	26.4		
1964	64,000	2,703	606	2,097	42.3	9.5	32.8		
1965	65,000	2,820	584	2,236	43.4	9.0	34.4		
1966	66,000	2,639	556	2,083	39.8	8.4	31.4		
1967	68,000	2,934	516	2,418	43.3	7.6	35.7		
1968	69,000	2,686	626	2,060	38.9	9.1	29.8		
1969	70,000	2,694	744	1,950	38.4	10.6	27.8		
1970	71,000	2,503	583	1,920	35.2	8.2	27.0		
1971	72,000	2,677	664	2,013	37.4	9.3	28.1		
1972	72,000	2,591	543	2,048	36.1	7.6	28.5		
1973	72,000	2,298	505	1,793	32.0	7.0	25.0		
1974	72,000	2,062	511	1,551	28.7	7.1	21.6		
1975	72,000	1,783	483	1,300	24.7	6.7	18.0		
1976	73,000	1,758	532	1,226	24.2	7.3	16.9		
1977	73,000	1,745	521	1,224	23.8	7.1	16.7		
1978	74,000	1,735	417	1,318	23.4	5.6	17.8		
1979	75,000	1,521	304	1,217	20.3	4.1	16.2		
1980	75,000	1,819	387	1,432	24.2	5.1	19.0		
1981	75,000	1,661	338	1,323	22.0	4.5	17.6		
1982	75,000	1,753	412	1,341	23.3	5.5	17.8		
1983	75,000	1,864	349	1,515	24.9	4.7	20.3		
1984	74,000	1,716	432	1,284	23.1	5.8	17.3		
1985	74,000	1,703	466	1,237	23.1	6.3	16.8		
1986	73,000	1,721	488	1,233	23.6	6.7	16.9		
1987	72,000	1,621	455	1,166	22.4	6.3	16.1		
1988	72,000	1,731	424	1,307	24.1	5.9	18.2		
1989	71,000	1,657	497	1,160	23.3	7.0	16.3		
1990	71,000	1,604	512	1,092	22.6	7.2	15.4		
1991	71,000	1,712	518	1,194	24.2	7.3	16.9		
1992	71,000	1,836	566	1,270	25.9	8.0	17.9		
1993	71,000	1,757	558	1,199	24.7	7.8	16.8		
1994	71,000	1,605	530	1,075	22.5	7.4	15.1		
1995	71,000	1,501	584	917	21.0	8.2	12.8		
1996	71,000	1,426	583	843	20.0	8.2	11.8		
1997	71,000	1,340	513	827	18.9	7.3	11.7		
1998	70,000	1,236	595	641	17.6	8.5	9.1		
1999	70,000	1,291	631	660	18.5	9.0	9.4		
2000	70,000	1,199	503	696	17.2	7.2	10.0	1.75	
2001	70,000	1,213	510	703	17.4	7.3	10.1	1.77	
2002	70,000	1,081	594	487	15.5	8.5	7.0	1.74	
2003	70,000	1,056	557	499	15.1	8.0	7.1	1.69	
2004	70,000	1,066	557	509	15.2	7.9	7.2	1.67	
2005	70,633	1,009	489	520	14.6	6.9	7.7	1.64	20.8
2006	70,751	1,035	538	497	12.8	7.6	5.2	1.65	12.6
2007	70,707	904	567	337	13.6	8.0	5.6	1.57	19.9
2008	70,745	964	545	419	13.4	7.7	5.7	1.61	10.4
2009	70,748	943	559	384	13.4	7.9	5.5	1.58	22.3
2010	70,712	933	579	354	13.2	8.2	5.0	1.56	13.9
2011	69,234	944	592	352	13.3	8.4	4.9	1.55	29.7
2012	69,724	951	603	348	13.4	8.5	4.9	1.56	16.8
2013	69,592	931	630	301	13.1	8.8	4.3	1.53	22.6
2014	71,281	858	590	268	12.0	8.2	3.8	1.46	19.8
2015	71,089	861	664	197	12.1	9.3	2.8		
2016	71,379	796	686	110	11.2	9.6	1.6		
2017	67,408	647	686	-39	9.6	9.6	-0.0		
2018	69,573								

== Ethnic groups ==
The vast majority of Dominicans are of African descent (75% at the 2014 census). There is a significant mixed population (19%) at the 2014 census due to intermarriage, along with a small European origin minority (0.8%; descendants of French, British, and Irish colonists), East Indians (0.1%) groups, and there are small numbers of Lebanese/Syrians (0.1%) and Asians.

=== Amerindians ===
Dominica is the only Eastern Caribbean island that still has a population of pre-Columbian native Caribs (also known as Kalinago), who were exterminated, driven from neighbouring islands, or mixed with Africans and/or Europeans. According to the 2001 census there are only 2,001 Caribs remaining (2.9% of the total population). A considerable growth occurred since the 1991 census when 1,634 Caribs were counted (2.4% of the total population). The Caribs live in eight villages on the east coast of Dominica. This special Carib Territory was granted by the British Crown in 1903. The present number of Kalinago is estimated at 4% more than 3,000.

== Languages ==
Languages of Dominica
- Official: English
- Vernacular: Dominican Creole, Kokoy, Antillean Creole

English is the official language and universally understood; however, because of historic French domination, Antillean Creole, a French-lexified creole language, is also widely spoken.

== Religion ==
According to the 2001 census, 91.2% percent of the population of Dominica is considered Christian, 1.6% has a non-Christian religion and 6.1% has no religion or did not state a religion (1.1%).

Roughly 58% of Christians are Roman Catholics, a reflection of early French influence on the island, and one third are Protestant. The Evangelicals constitute the largest Protestant group, with 6.7% of the population. Seventh-day Adventists are the second largest group (6.1%). The next largest group are Pentecostals (5.6% of the population), followed by Baptists (4.1%). Other Christians include Methodists (3.7%), Church of God (1.2%), Jehovah's Witnesses (1.2%), Anglicanism (0.6%) and Brethren Christian (0.3%). During the past decades the number of Roman Catholics and Anglicans has decreased, while the number of other Protestants has increased, especially Evangelicals, Seventh-day Adventists, Pentecostals (5.6% of the population) and Baptists.

The number of non-Christians is small. These religious groups include the Rastafarian Movement (1.3% of the population), Hinduism (0.1%) and Muslims (0.2%).
