= Petite Savanne =

Village in Dominica

Coordinates: 15°15′15″N 61°16′10″W

Petite Savanne (French for "little savannah") was a village on the southeast side of Dominica in Saint Patrick Parish. It had an estimated population of 1,200 in 2015. The region the town was built on features some of Dominica's steepest terrain; the slopes were composed largely of silt and clay.

== History ==
=== Settlement and Land Tenure ===
The origins of settlement in Petite Savanne are rooted in the land distribution policies of the colonial era. When Britain took control of Dominica in 1763, the island was surveyed and divided into lots, with the most fertile and accessible land reserved for large plantations. A strip of land approximately 66 yards wide encircling the island’s perimeter, known as the “King’s (or Queen’s) Three Chains,” was set aside for government use, including jetties and fortifications.

Following full emancipation in 1838, formerly enslaved labourers were permitted to remain on plantation lands only on condition of continued employment there. Many were consequently displaced, settling as squatters along the Queen’s Three Chains in coastal communities. Elsewhere, French settlers of modest means (poor whites from Martinique who had intermingled with Kalinago and free African populations) came to occupy rugged, marginal lands lying between the established estates. Petite Savanne, along with settlements such as Good Hope and Petite Soufrière, developed in this manner, built by communities who farmed and subsisted on terrain the plantation economy had bypassed.

== Tropical Storm Erika (2015) ==
=== Impact ===
On August 27, 2015, Tropical Storm Erika produced torrential rainfall across Dominica, triggering catastrophic flash flooding and mudslides. Throughout the nation, Erika killed up to 30 people and inflicted EC$1.3 billion (US$482.8 million) in damage. Multiple landslides devastated Petite Savanne. At least 6 deaths occurred in the community and a further 14 people were reported missing. A total of 217 homes were destroyed there, accounting for almost 60 percent of the total homes destroyed by the storm. Prime Minister Roosevelt Skerrit declared the village a special disaster area in light of the tremendous damage. A mandatory and permanent evacuation of all residents was subsequently implemented. The majority were to be relocated to Roseau. The village was initially isolated for several days, and only accessible by sea or air even a week after the storm. Owing to unstable terrain, the area was declared unsafe and off-limits to all travel for more than two months after Erika.

=== Evacuation and Resettlement ===
The destruction of Petite Savanne forced the evacuation of 823 people; the village was later deemed uninhabitable and a new town needed to be built elsewhere. Plans for a new settlement, comprising 500–1,000 homes, were established in February 2016. A government resettlement programme relocated a significant number of residents to Bellevue Chopin, where 353 housing units were constructed under the Citizenship by Investment Programme and completed in 2019. As of 2025, the original village remains largely abandoned, though approximately 60 residents continue to live there, sustaining limited livelihoods on the land.

== Politics and Government ==
=== Petite Savanne Constituency ===
Petite Savanne is part of the Petite Savanne Constituency, one of Dominica’s 21 parliamentary constituencies established under the Constitution of the Commonwealth of Dominica. The constituency runs along the island’s southeastern coast and encompasses the communities of Bagatelle, Bellevue Chopin, Fond Saint Jean, and Petite Savanne. Its boundaries, as defined by the Electoral Office of Dominica, are bordered to the north by the La Plaine Constituency, to the east by the Atlantic Ocean, and to the south by the Grand Bay Constituency. The southwestern boundary follows the eastern limit of the parish of Saint Luke to Morne Canotte, from which a straight line extends northwest to Morne Anglais.

The constituency has been consistently represented by members of the Dominica Labour Party (DLP).
