= Saint Mark Parish =

Saint Mark Parish may refer to:

- Saint Mark Parish, Dominica
- Saint Mark Parish, Grenada
