= Wotten Waven =

- Village
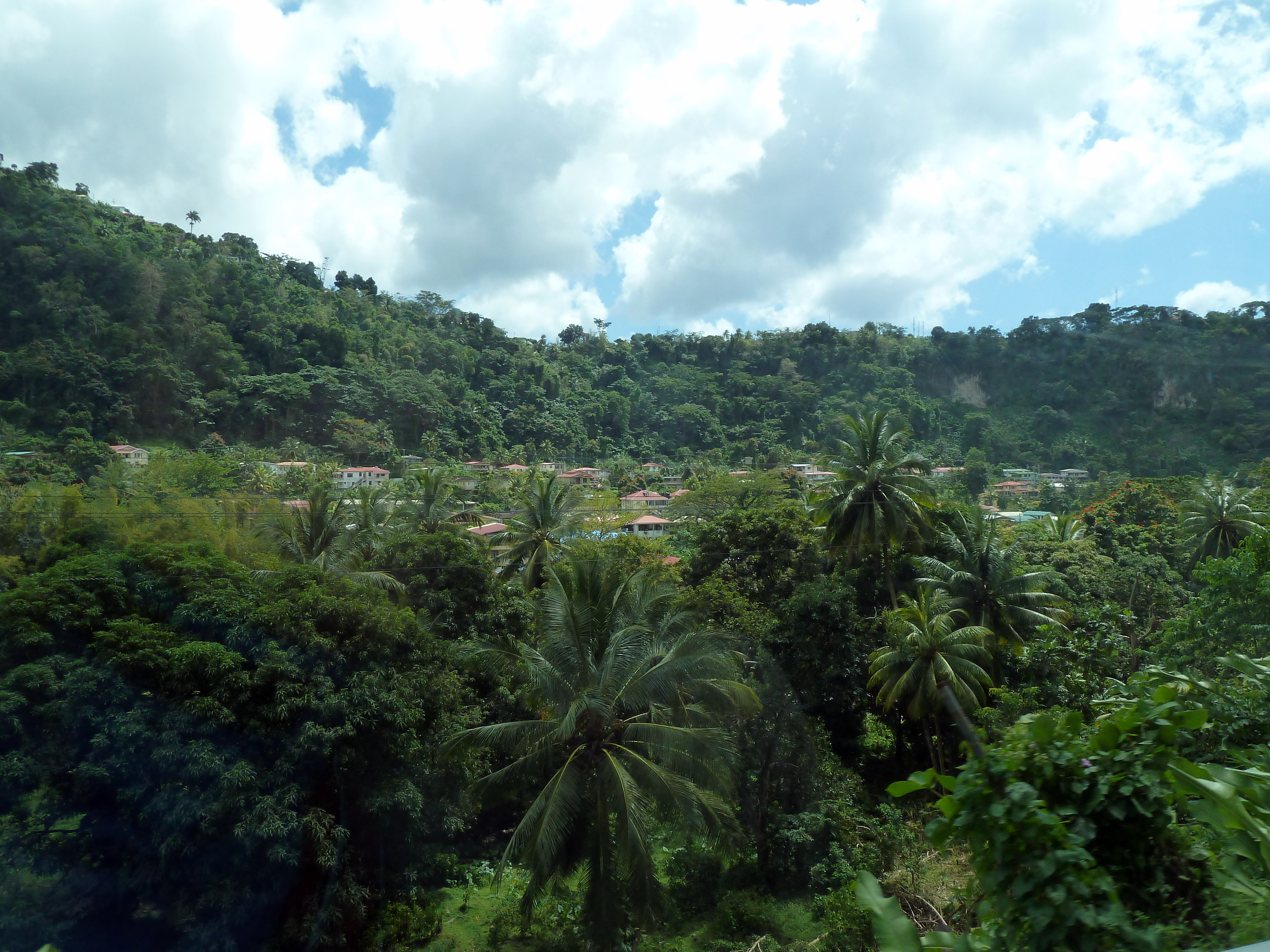
- Wotten Waven in 2016

- Location within Dominica
- Coordinates: 15°19′11″N 61°20′20″W
- Country: Dominica
- Parish: Saint George

Wotten Waven is a village in Dominica's Roseau Valley. It has a population of 226 people. It was hit by Hurricane Maria

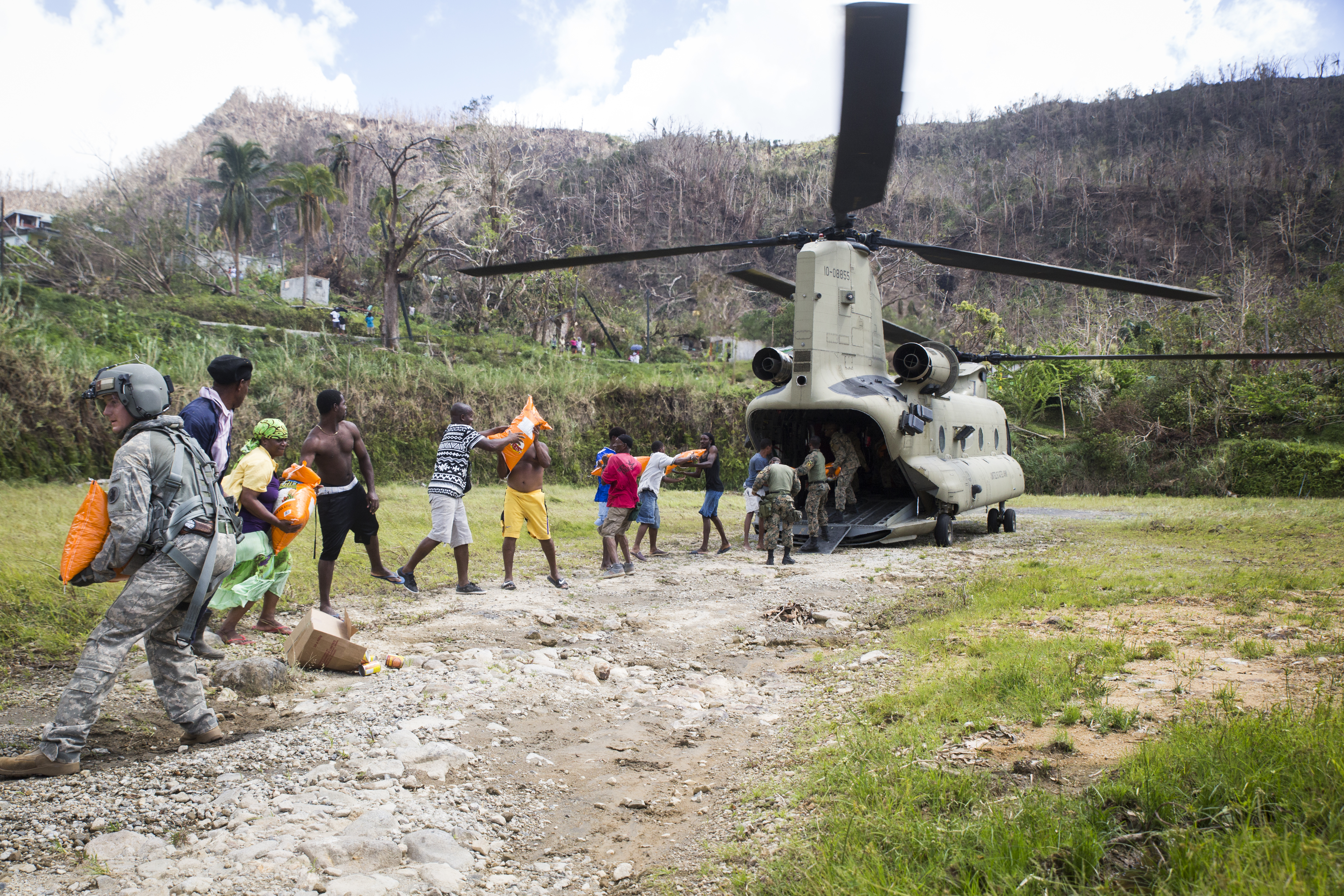
US soldiers and citizens of Wotten Waven working to distribute aid after Hurricane Maria
