= Dominican politics =

Dominican politics may refer to:

- Politics of the Dominican Republic
- Politics of Dominica
