= Trafalgar, Dominica =

Trafalgar
- Village
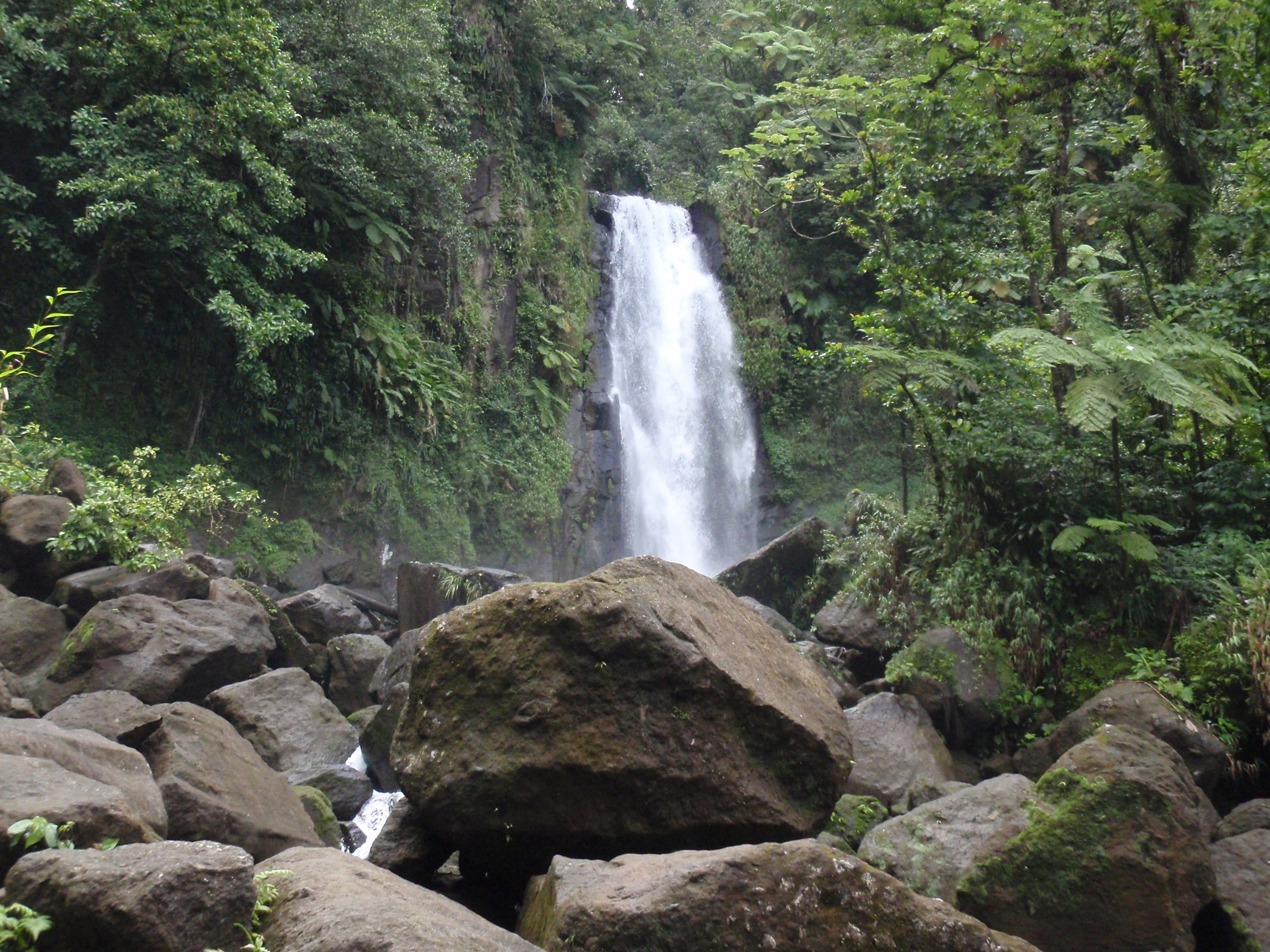
- Trafalgar Falls at Morne Trois Pitons National Park

- Location in Dominica
- Coordinates: 15°19′N 61°21′W
- Country: Dominica
- Parish: Saint George

Trafalgar is a village in inland Dominica, located to the northeast of the capital, Roseau, and close to Morne Trois Pitons, the mountain which dominates the southern centre of the country.

Trafalgar is best known for Trafalgar Falls and the associated Trafalgar hydroplant. In addition to hydroelectricity, Trafalgar Falls are becoming a popular destination as part of Dominica's ecotourism industry.
