= Galion, Dominica =

Human settlement in Dominica

Galion Gallion
- Village
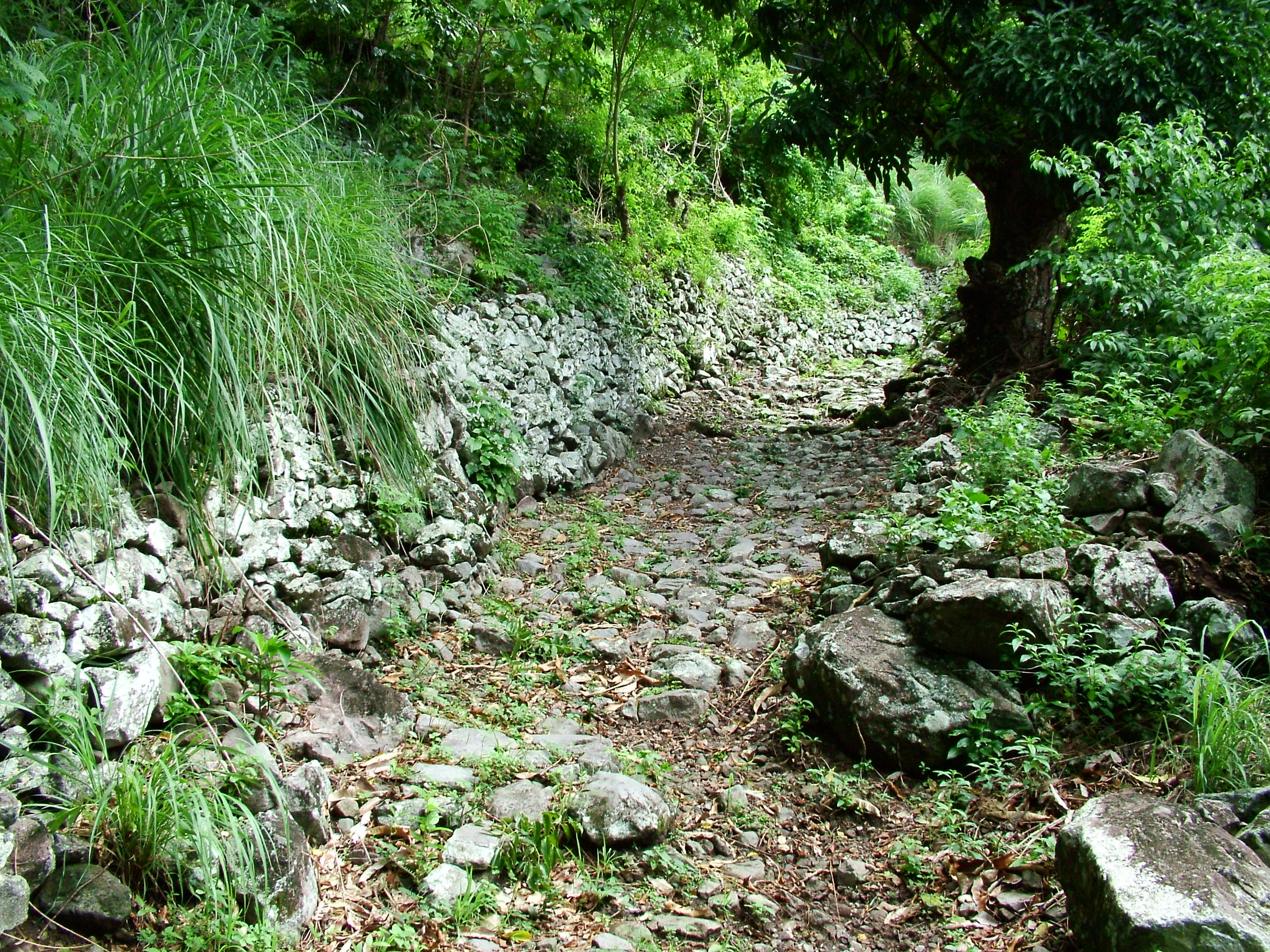
- The Old Stone Road from Galion

- Location in Dominica
- Coordinates: 15°13′22″N 61°21′26″W
- Country: Dominica
- Parish: Saint Mark

Population (2001)
  - Total: 134
- Time zone: UTC-4 (AST)

Galion, also spelled Gallion, is a mountain village in the south of Dominica, with a population of 134.
