= Grand Bay, Dominica =

Grand Bay
- Village
- Berekua
- Coordinates: 15°14′20″N 061°18′50″W
- Country: Dominica
- Parish: Saint Patrick
- Elevation: 29 m (95 ft)

Population (2010)
  - Total: 2,288

Grand Bay, also known as Berekua or Berricoa, is a village in the south of Dominica. It has a population of 2,288 as of 2010, and is the largest settlement in St. Patrick Parish.

Grand Bay, also called South City, the cultural capital of Dominica, is located along the Atlantic Ocean coast in the south-east of Dominica. To its immediate south across the sea is the island of Martinique.

== Geography ==
The village is surrounded by several scenic mountain ranges including Bois Den to the south, Palmiste to the west, Morne Plat Pays to the north-west, Morne Anglais and Morne Watt to the north, Foundland range to the north east and east. Nestled along the slopes of these mountains are the villages of Bellevue, Pichelin, Montine, Tete Morne, Grand Coulibrie, Dubique and Stowe. The main community of Grand Bay is characterized by its long narrow street called Lallay, on both sides of which the largest population resides. In addition there is Mabouchay, Back Street, Hagley, Wavin Banan, Powell and Berikua, making up the older residential area. Since Hurricane David in 1979, the village has extended to include the new communities of Geneva, Highland, Bala Park and Bolom.

== History ==
Grand Bay has been the first Village in Dominica to have its very own radio station which has existed since the mid-'80s. This radio station is called RADIO En Ba Mango.

The people of Grand Bay are known to uphold the cultural heritage of Dominica in dance, music, art and craft and language. The cadence music, the creole language and many other traditions are part of the daily life of the community.

== Economy ==
The economy is based mainly on agriculture with the production of a variety of root crops, bananas, other fruits and vegetables for the local and overseas market. There is a small furniture manufacturing industry and many small shops and snackettes. Some people engage in the production of craft items for tourists and locals alike and recently, a small cottage soap making plant was established at Geneva.
