= ISO 3166-2:DM =

Entry for Dominica in ISO 3166-2

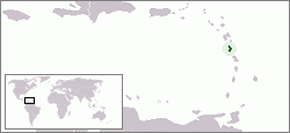
Location of Dominica

ISO 3166-2:DM is the entry for Dominica in ISO 3166-2, part of the ISO 3166 standard published by the International Organization for Standardization (ISO), which defines codes for the names of the principal subdivisions (e.g., provinces or states) of all countries coded in ISO 3166-1.

Currently for Dominica, ISO 3166-2 codes are defined for ten parishes.

Each code consists of two parts, separated by a hyphen. The first part is DM, the ISO 3166-1 alpha-2 code of Dominica. The second part is two digits (02–11).

== Current codes ==
Subdivision names are listed as in the ISO 3166-2 standard published by the ISO 3166 Maintenance Agency (ISO 3166/MA).

Click on the button in the header to sort each column.

Code	Subdivision name (en)
DM-02	Saint Andrew
DM-03	Saint David
DM-04	Saint George
DM-05	Saint John
DM-06	Saint Joseph
DM-07	Saint Luke
DM-08	Saint Mark
DM-09	Saint Patrick
DM-10	Saint Paul
DM-11	Saint Peter

== Changes ==
The following changes to the entry have been announced in newsletters by the ISO 3166/MA since the first publication of ISO 3166-2 in 1998:

Newsletter	Date issued	Description of change in newsletter	Code/Subdivision change
Newsletter I-8	2007-04-17	Addition of the administrative subdivisions and of their code elements	Subdivisions added: 10 parishes

== See also ==
- Subdivisions of Dominica
- FIPS region codes of Dominica
