= Tropical Storm Erika =

Atlantic tropical storm in 2015

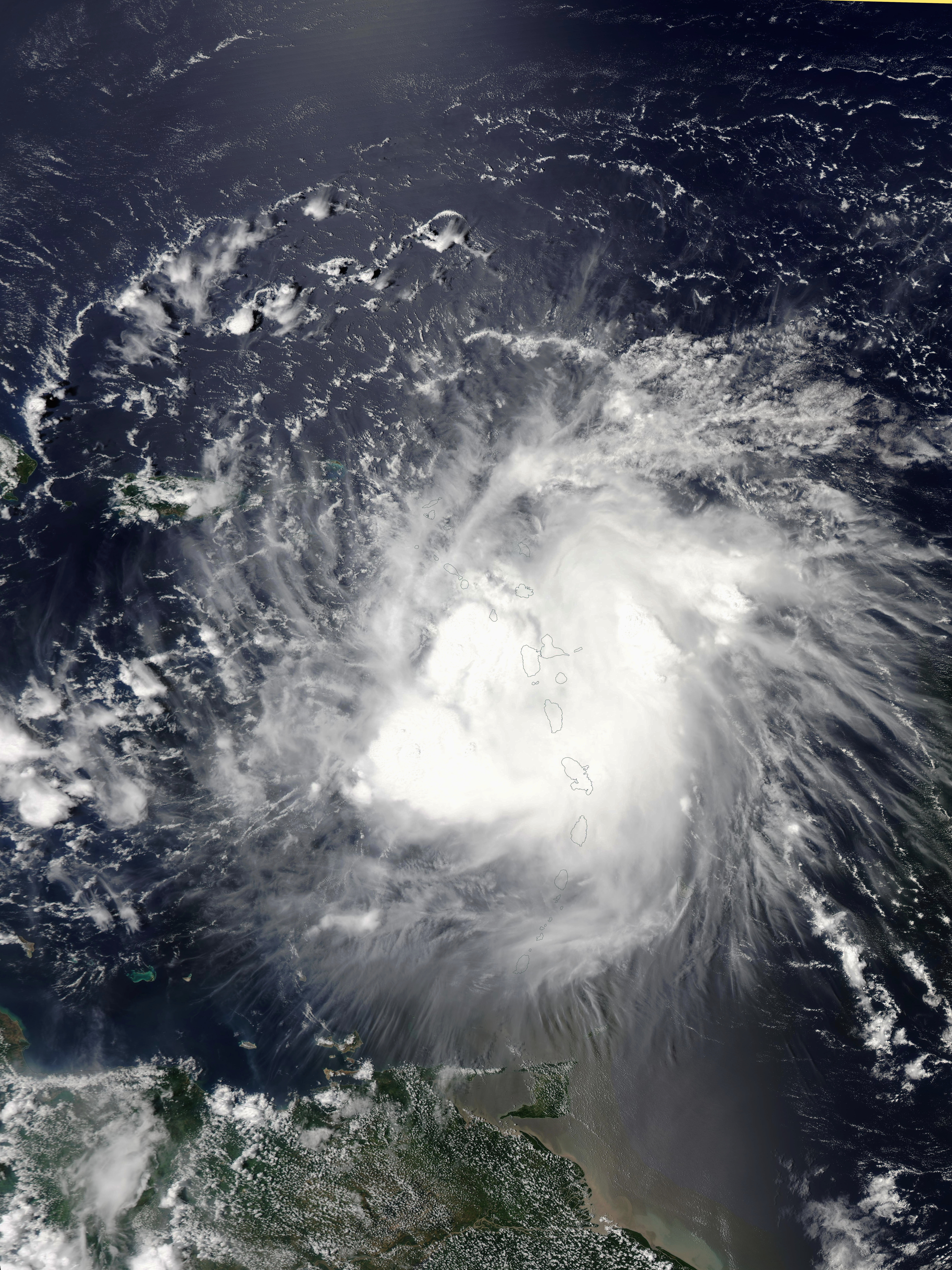
- Tropical Storm Erika over the Leeward Islands on August 27

Meteorological history
- Formed: August 24, 2015
- Dissipated: August 28, 2015

Tropical storm
- 1-minute sustained (SSHWS/NWS)
- Highest winds: 50 mph (85 km/h)
- Lowest pressure: 1001 mbar (hPa); 29.56 inHg

Overall effects
- Fatalities: 35
- Damage: $511 million (2015 USD)
- Areas affected: Antilles (particularly Dominica), The Bahamas, Florida
- IBTrACS
- Part of the 2015 Atlantic hurricane season

Tropical Storm Erika was a weak but deadly tropical storm that is regarded as one of the worst natural disasters in Dominica since Hurricane David in 1979. The fifth named storm of the 2015 Atlantic hurricane season, Erika developed from a westward-moving tropical wave while well east of the Lesser Antilles. Hostile conditions, including dry air and wind shear, inhibited significant development, and Erika failed to acquire sustained winds beyond 50 mph (80 km/h). Contrary to predictions of a northwesterly recurvature, the cyclone persisted on a westerly course and passed through the Leeward Islands and emerged over the Caribbean Sea on August 27. Erika succumbed to adverse conditions the following day, dissipating as a tropical cyclone near the Dominican Republic. The remnant system persisted for several more days, moving into the northeastern Gulf of Mexico, before dissipating over Georgia on September 3.

Several islands experienced heavy rainfall during the passage of Erika, especially Dominica. The storm's asymmetric structure, coupled with the mountainous terrain of the island and ample moisture aloft, led to rainfall accumulations up to 33 in (850 mm). With grounds already saturated from antecedent rainfall, tremendous runoff quickly overwhelmed river basins and triggered catastrophic floods. Accompanying mudslides worsened the situation, temporarily damming the rivers before collapsing. Hundreds of homes were left uninhabitable and thousands of people were displaced; the entire town of Petite Savanne was evacuated and subsequently abandoned as a result of the storm. All told, 30 people died across the island in the nation's worst disaster since Hurricane David. The storm's devastating effects in Dominica prompted an influx of international assistance. Aid from multiple nations and intergovernmental organizations poured in to assist victims of the storm. Thousands of homes needed to be built or repaired, including 500–1,000 for the relocation of all of Petite Savanne's residents. Recovery in Dominica was halted in September 2017 by Hurricane Maria, a Category 5 hurricane that brought far greater devastation on the island.

In Guadeloupe, heavy rainfall in the vicinity of Basse-Terre caused flooding and mudslides, forcing roads to temporarily close. Approximately 250,000 people in Puerto Rico were left without electricity. The island experienced US$17.37 million (Note: All damage totals are in 2015 values of their respective currency.) in agricultural damage. In the Dominican Republic, a weather station in Barahona measured 24.26 in (616 mm) of rain, including 8.8 in (220 mm) in a single hour. About 823 homes suffered damage and 7,345 people were displaced. Five people died in Haiti, four from a weather-related traffic accident and one from a landslide. Total damage from Erika is estimated to be over US$500 million, with US$482.8 million in Dominica alone.

== Meteorological history ==
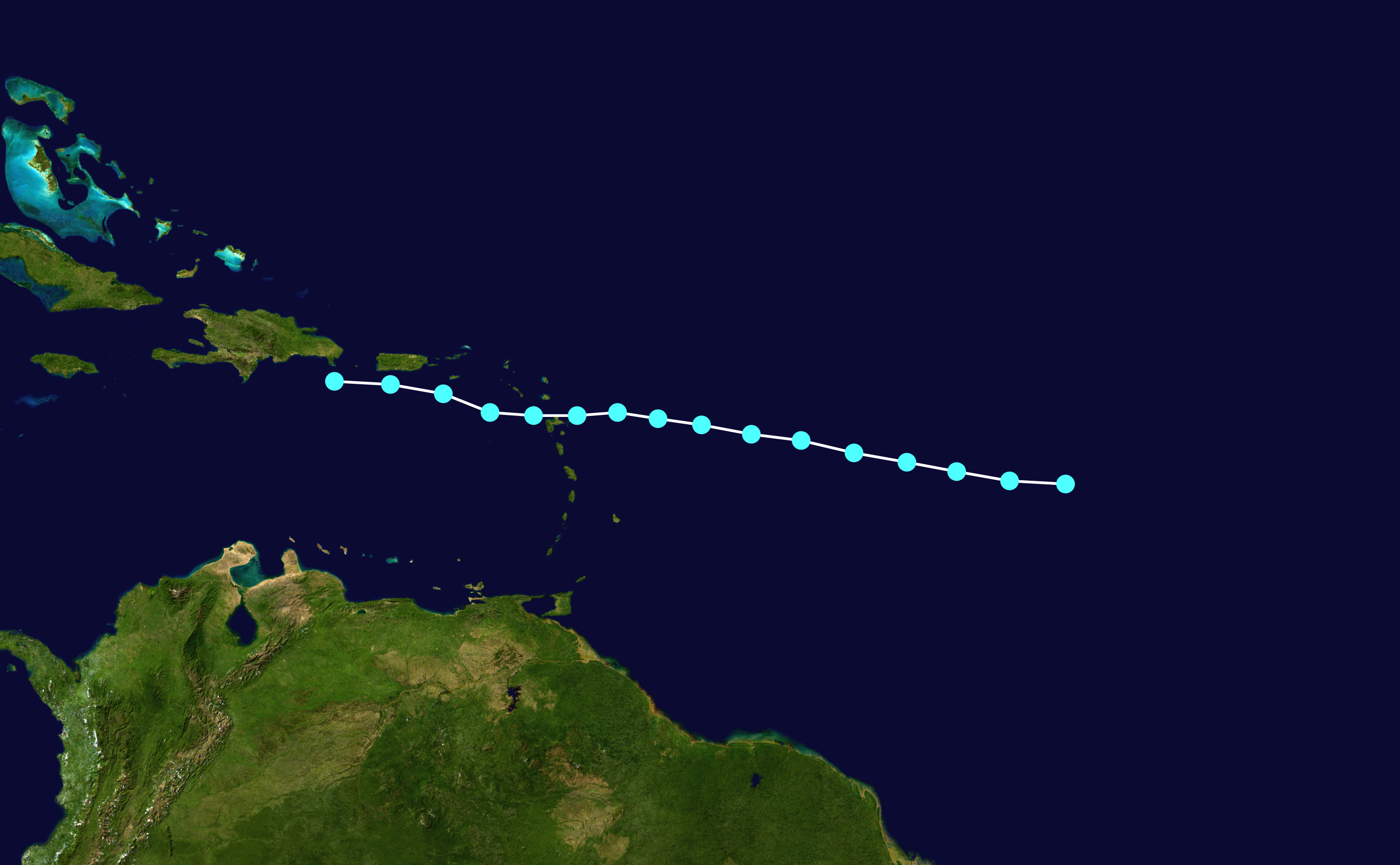
Map plotting the storm's track and intensity, according to the Saffir–Simpson scale Map key Saffir–Simpson scale Tropical depression (≤38 mph, ≤62 km/h) Tropical storm (39–73 mph, 63–118 km/h) Category 1 (74–95 mph, 119–153 km/h) Category 2 (96–110 mph, 154–177 km/h) Category 3 (111–129 mph, 178–208 km/h) Category 4 (130–156 mph, 209–251 km/h) Category 5 (≥157 mph, ≥252 km/h) Unknown Storm type Tropical cyclone Subtropical cyclone Extratropical cyclone, remnant low, tropical disturbance, or monsoon depression

On August 20, 2015, the National Hurricane Center (NHC) began monitoring a tropical wave over western Africa, near the Atlantic shore. The disorganized system emerged over the Atlantic Ocean several hundred miles southeast of the Cape Verde Islands the following day. Moving quickly west, the system bypassed the Cape Verde Islands to the south on August 22, but remained largely disorganized. A sharp trough developed within expanding deep convection on August 23, though a well-defined circulation did not consolidate. Organization of the low improved throughout the day as environmental conditions favored tropical cyclogenesis. The trough acquired gale-force winds the following day and finally developed a closed circulation by 18:00 UTC. The formation of a closed low marked the transition into a tropical cyclone; accordingly, the system was classified as Tropical Storm Erika, the fifth named storm of the annual hurricane season. Upon its designation, Erika was situated roughly 1,035 mi (1,665 km) east of the Lesser Antilles. The storm maintained a brisk westward trajectory, steered by a subtropical ridge to the north.

At the time of Erika's classification, forecast models diverged significantly on the potential future of the storm. Statistical guidance and the HWRF depicted a hurricane while the ECMWF and GFS showed a weaker system due to increasing wind shear. The models that intensified the storm indicated a more northerly track while those that kept it weaker had the system continuing along a westward course. Accordingly, the NHC noted low confidence in their five-day forecast for Erika. This uncertainty ultimately reflected in above-average forecast errors when compared to all tropical cyclones, but roughly average for weak, poorly organized systems. Throughout August 25 and into early August 26, the convective organization of Erika fluctuated due to wind shear and entrainment of dry air, periodically leaving the center of circulation devoid of convection. Early on August 27, Erika managed to intensify slightly, attaining its peak intensity with maximum sustained winds of 50 mph (80 km/h) and a barometric pressure of 1,001 mbar (29.6 inHg). Around 09:00 UTC, the disorganized center of Erika passed near the northern tip of Guadeloupe, before emerging over the eastern Caribbean Sea.

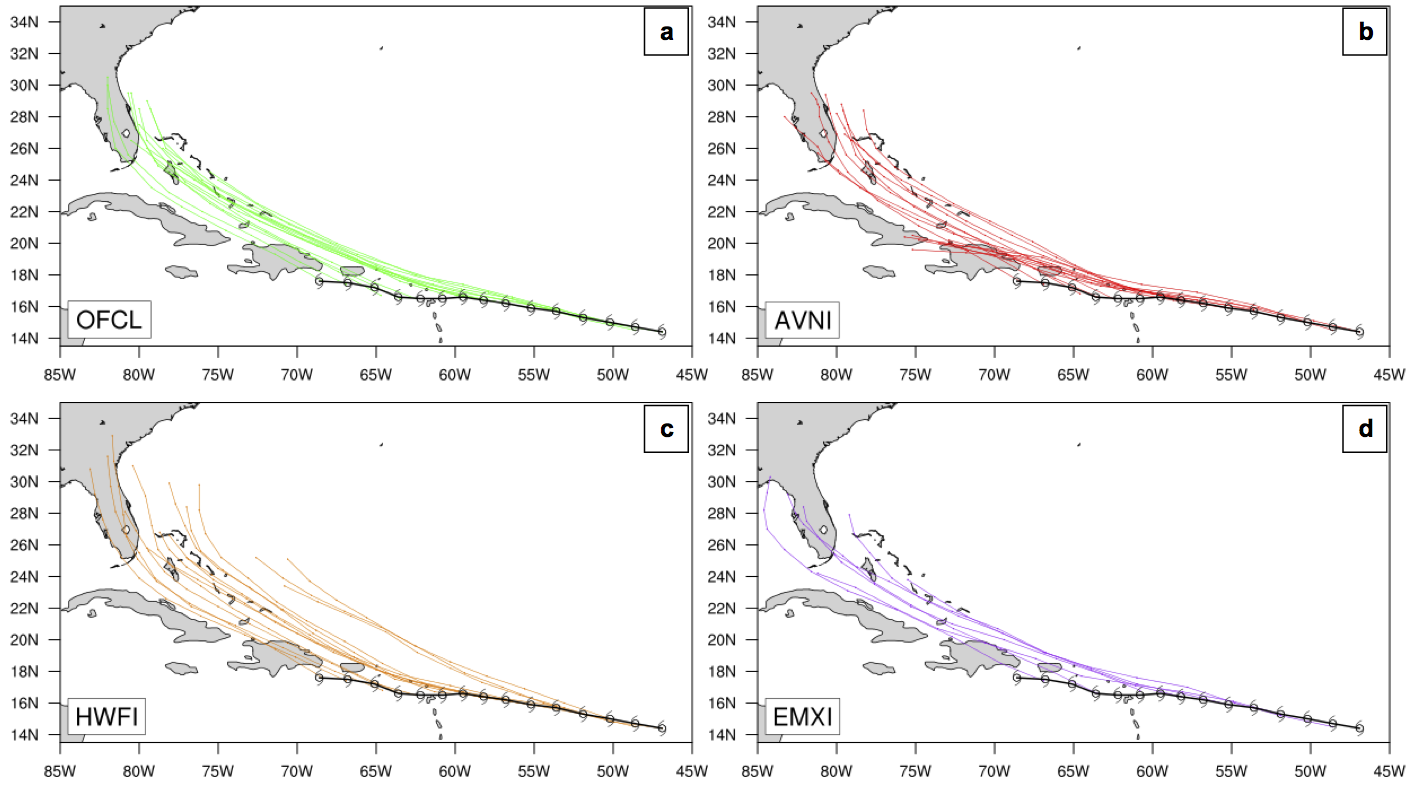
Official forecast positions (top left) and various forecast models for Erika versus its best track positions (black lines). Note the consistent northerly bias present in all outputs.

Convection remained poorly-organized and mostly confined to eastern portions of the cyclone, as it traversed the eastern Caribbean Sea. Multiple circulation centers were noted during the overnight of August 27–28, all rotating around a broad general center. One such center moved over St. Croix and produced gale-force gusts. Environmental conditions ahead of the storm became increasingly hostile, and forecasters at the NHC continued to note unusually high uncertainty in their forecasts. Further structural degradation ensued on August 28 as Erika approached the Dominican Republic. Based on data from Hurricane Hunters, Erika degenerated into a broad area of low pressure—no longer meeting the definition of a tropical cyclone—shortly after 12:00 UTC, near the southeastern coast of the Dominican Republic. Operationally, the NHC maintained advisories on Erika until 13:30 UTC on August 29. It was also noted during those advisories that the center was completely devoid of convection, and whatever convection remained was reduced to the eastern half of the system.

Around 21:00 UTC on August 28, the remnants of Erika made landfall along the southeastern coast of the Dominican Republic. The disheveled system emerged over the Windward Passage early on August 29. Thereafter, the system skirted the northern coast of Cuba and entered the Gulf of Mexico on August 31. Turning northward, the disturbance eventually crossed northern Florida on September 2, before dissipating over Georgia on the following day.

== Preparations ==
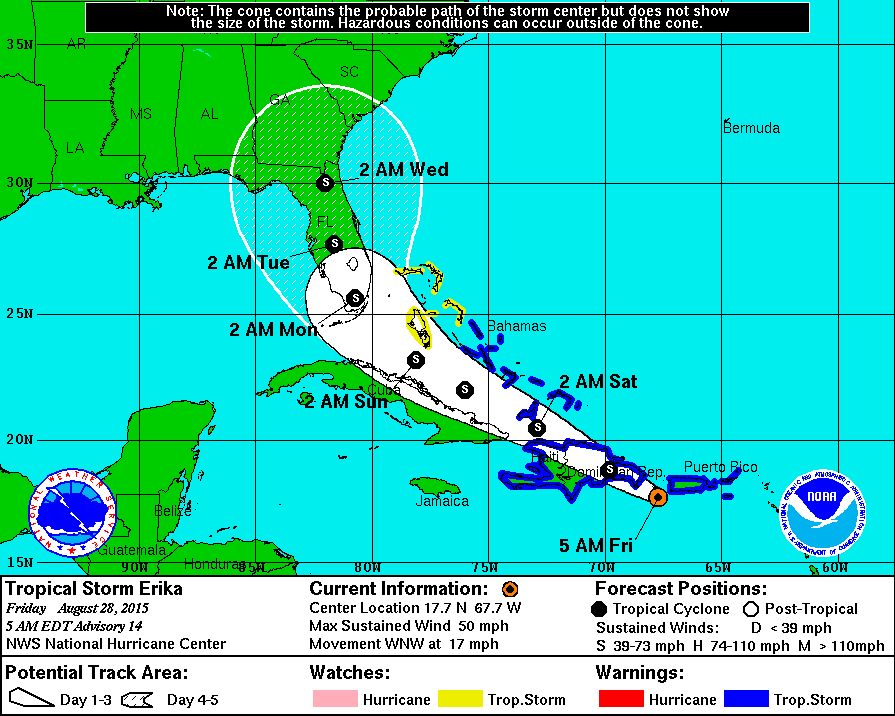
The NHC's forecast track for Tropical Storm Erika at 5:00 a.m. EDT (09:00 UTC) on August 28, just before its dissipation as a tropical cyclone, depicting the storm traversing the Dominican Republic, brushing the Bahamas, and moving across the entirety of the Florida Peninsula.

=== Caribbean ===
Various local governments issued tropical storm watches and warnings for their respective nations throughout the duration of Erika. Watches and warnings covered the Lesser Antilles from Guadeloupe northward, almost the entirety of the Greater Antilles, and the Bahamas. The Red Cross opened four shelters to the public across the United States Virgin Islands. The local Health Department also opened special needs shelters on St. Croix and St. Thomas. All non-essential government personnel were given administrative leave on August 27. Owing to rough seas, local ports temporarily closed. Although airports remained open, several airlines cancelled flights. A territory-wide curfew was imposed until the afternoon of August 28.

Schools, ports, and beaches were closed across the Dominican Republic. The Army of the Dominican Republic deployed 275 soldiers and alongside the nation's Air Force, assisted with the evacuation of residents. The Navy was placed on standby for potential search and rescue operations. Officials in Haiti suspended air service, banned highway travel between departments, and ordered small watercraft to remain at port. Evacuation shelters were opened across all departments and 254 prisoners were relocated from Gonaïves to three other facilities.

=== Florida ===
On August 28, Florida Governor Rick Scott declared a state of emergency. Despite the storm dissipating shortly thereafter, Scott kept the emergency declaration in place and stated, "This storm has been completely unpredictable the whole time...we will still get a lot of rain and a lot of flooding." Thirty members of the Florida National Guard were positioned while another 8,000 were placed on standby. A collective 17 flights were cancelled at Miami International Airport and Fort Lauderdale–Hollywood International Airport on August 28. Schools in Hendry County preemptively closed for August 31, with officials citing flooding concerns. The National Park Service shut down Biscayne National Park on August 28, and Dry Tortugas National Park and Everglades National Park on August 29. Sandbags were distributed to residents in Doral, Hallandale Beach, Hollywood, and Sweetwater. The last hurricane to impact the state was Hurricane Wilma in 2005. Since that time, the state's population grew by 2 million with many presumed to have never experienced a hurricane before. Some newer residents remained apathetic over the storm, dismissing it as "another excuse to skip work or school or to party."

== Impact ==
Impact by country or region
County/Region	Deaths		Damage (USD)	Ref.
County/Region	Direct	Indirect	Damage (USD)	Ref.
Dominica	30	0	$482.8 million	
Dominican Republic	0	0	$8.91 million	
Haiti	1	4	—N/a	
United States	0	0	$19.4 million (Note: $17.37 million in Puerto Rico plus $2.3 million in the Southeastern United States.)	
Total	31	4	$511.38 million	

=== Caribbean ===
In Guadeloupe, rain totals reached 100 mm (3.9 in) in Basse-Terre while gusts peaked at 100 km/h (62 mph) on La Désirade. Some landslides and flooding were reported, with roads in Basse-Terre temporarily closed. Électricité de France reported that 1,600 customers lost power during the storm. Rough seas in Martinique grounded boats. Landslides and felled trees blocked several roadways across the island. Elsewhere in the Lesser Antilles, effects from Erika were negligible.

Infrared satellite loop of Erika over the Lesser Antilles on August 27

The outer bands of Erika brought much needed rain to drought-stricken Puerto Rico; a station in Adjuntas recorded 4.45 in (113 mm) of rain. Tropical storm-force wind gusts, peaking at 59 mph (95 km/h) in Maricao, caused substantial disruption to the power grid, leaving approximately 250,000 people without electricity. Thirty-six homes sustained roof damage across interior locations of the territory and agriculture sustained US$17.37 million in damage.

A weather station in Barahona, Dominican Republic, measured 24.26 in (616 mm) of rain during Erika's passage, including 8.8 in (220 mm) in a single hour. Surrounding areas reported significantly less rain, however. Throughout the country, 823 homes suffered damage and 7,345 people were displaced. Erika blocked over 400 roads and left many power outages. Winds gusts of 50 mph (80 km/h) in Azua caused at least RD$400 million (US$8.91 million) in damage to the banana crop. Heavy rainfall also impacted Haiti, which was still recovering from a catastrophic earthquake in 2010; an estimated 60,000 people remained in emergency housing. Four persons died and eleven others were hospitalized in Léogâne, when a truck crashed into a bus on rain-slicked roads and exploded. A fifth death occurred during a landslide in Port-au-Prince. Two people in the area were injured after a house collapsed.

The remnants of Erika later brought much needed rains to Cuba, which was suffering from its worst drought since 1901.

=== Southeastern United States ===
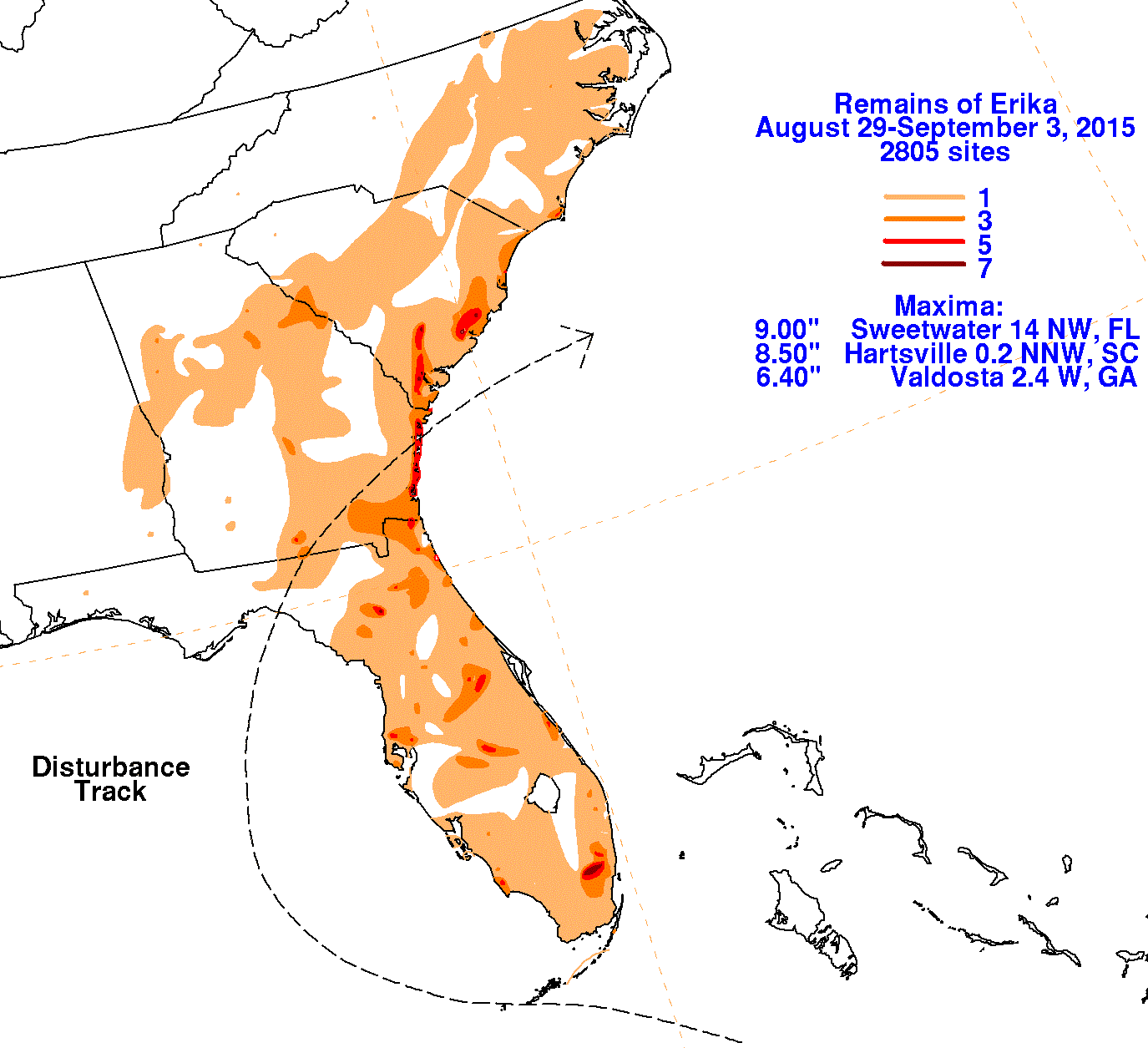
Rainfall from the remnants of Erika across the Southeastern United States

Later, Erika's remnants dropped locally heavy rainfall across Florida, particularly in the Miami Metropolitan Area. A station northwest of Sweetwater observed 9 in (230 mm) of rain. Minor flash flooding left streets in Wynwood impassable. Farther north in Flagler County, scattered thunderstorms produced isolated instances of heavy rain; 2.2 in (56 mm) fell within one hour in Palm Coast. In the greater Jacksonville area, lightning struck the Sally B. Mathis Elementary School, resulting in damage to the air conditioning unit and evacuation of students. In neighboring Georgia, moisture from Erika's remnants fueled scattered severe thunderstorms. Large hail caused US$2.3 million in damage near Woodstock. Strong winds gusting up to 60 mph (97 km/h) accompanied these storms, downing trees and power lines in Cherokee, Polk, and Troup counties. Additional rainfall extended north through the Carolinas.

== Effects in Dominica ==
The rugged terrain of Dominica makes it prone to landslides in heavy rain events. The town of Petite Savanne (pictured), situated on steep cliffs, was rendered uninhabitable after numerous landslides devastated the area.

Although Erika passed well to the north of Dominica as a weak tropical storm, torrential rain associated with the storm impacted the country. Unusually high precipitable water values of 2.6 in (67 mm) were present over the island as Erika moved through. Orographic influence exacerbated rainfall rates, and this was further compounded with the formation of a temporary mesoscale low over the island as the primary circulation of Erika continued west. More than 8 in (200 mm) of rain fell across the entire island in less than 48 hours, with an island-wide average of 24 in (610 mm). (Note: The majority of rainfall amounts across the island were calculated through analyses of radar data with bias corrections.) During the period of heaviest rain, average rainfall across the entire island exceeded 3.5 in (90 mm) per hour. Rates along the Macoucherie River reached 11 in (270 mm) per hour. The heaviest rain was concentrated around the nation's tallest mountain, Morne Diablotins, where an estimated 31 to 33 in (800 to 850 mm) fell. Rainfall across Morne Diablotin National Park generally exceeded 24 in (600 mm). A secondary peak accumulation of 26 to 28 in (650 to 700 mm) occurred in the southeastern part of the island around Morne Trois Pitons. Observed accumulations include 17 in (430 mm) at Gleau Gommier, 12.62 in (321 mm) at Canefield Airport, and 8.74 in (222 mm) at Douglas–Charles Airport. With grounds already saturated from nearly two weeks of rain prior to Erika, much of the precipitation did not penetrate the surface; in multiple watersheds, runoff exceeded 60 percent of accumulations.

Catastrophic flash flooding and mudslides ensued across the island, resulting in Dominica's worst natural disaster since Hurricane David in 1979. Across the island's rugged terrain, the mudslides temporarily dammed overflowing rivers creating a buildup of water. These earthen dams subsequently collapsed, leading to amplified flooding downstream. Flow rates in these localized events vastly exceeded values expected by International Commission on Large Dams modeling. A post-storm study of 16 rivers on the island revealed peak discharge values in excess of 1,000 m^{3}/s along 5 rivers, with a maximum of 2,876 m^{3}/s along the Malabuka River.

Nearly 17,000 of the nation's 71,293 people were severely impacted by the storm. A total of 30 people were killed, 20 others were injured, and 574 people were left homeless. More than 890 homes were destroyed or rendered uninhabitable. Infrastructure suffered tremendous damage: 6 percent of bridges and 17 percent of roads were wiped out. Furthermore, half of the nation's bridges and a quarter of its roads were damaged. Total losses amounted to EC$1.3 billion (US$482.8 million), roughly 90 percent of Dominica's gross domestic product. Dominica Prime Minister Roosevelt Skerrit stated in a national announcement on August 28 that, "The visual damage I saw today, I fear, may have set our development process back by 20 years".

Flooding crippled transportation and communication, with eight bridges severely damaged or destroyed, leaving many areas of the island isolated. Boetica and Delices remained cut-off by ground for more than three weeks. More than 12 major rivers topped their banks. Approximately 45 percent of residents lost electricity, and almost the entirety of the water supply network was damaged. Additionally, 50 percent of telephone service was lost. Both Canefield and Douglas–Charles airports were flooded, with water rising above a small airplane at the latter. Douglas–Charles Airport sustained more than EC$39.5 million (US$14.6 million) in damage and was closed until September 18. The main river running through Roseau, the nation's capital, burst its banks during the overnight of August 26–27, flooding surrounding areas. One person was killed during a mudslide and one building collapsed in the city.

The small community of Petite Savanne was virtually destroyed, with 217 homes leveled and all residents forced to evacuate. Twenty people died or were presumed dead in the village, accounting for two-thirds of the deaths attributed to Erika in Dominica. Residents dug through mud and debris, often with their bare hands, to rescue those trapped and in many cases did so with nearby homes on the verge of collapse. The village was isolated for several days and residents buried victims before help arrived.

=== Local response ===
Immediately following Erika's devastating impact in Dominica on August 27, the Organisation of Eastern Caribbean States convened to determine an assessment plan. The Government of Dominica declared nine areas special disaster areas: Petite Savanne, Pichelin, Good Hope, Bath Estate, Dubique, Campbell, Coulibistrie, San Sauveur, and Petite Soufriere. The National Emergency Operations Centre was activated and worked in conjunction with various local agencies to conduct relief missions. Approximately 100 personnel were deployed for various relief measures, including search and rescue. The Dominica Spa Health and Wellness Association worked in conjunction with the Trinidad-based Centre for Human Development to provide psychological support to victims; eight trauma specialists were sent to Dominica.

The psychiatric unit of Princess Margaret Hospital conducted field assessments and provided emotional support to residents. In a report on September 18, they noted that residents in Coulibistrie remained in a state of shock for weeks after Erika, with many struggling to begin the recovery process. The Ministry of Health highlighted concerns over post-storm diseases, particularly from mosquitoes, due to a major increase in the usage of water storage containers. An outbreak of Gastroenteritis ensued in the weeks following Erika, with 153 cases confirmed by September 22. Cases were primarily in Portsmouth, Saint Joseph, and Roseau.

A unique means of supplying food and water the communities of Boetica and Delices, only accessible by air due to a gorge 260 ft (80 m) wide and 200 ft (61 m) deep, was established in the form of a zip-line in late-September. This served as the primary means of aid until a 98 ft (30 m) Bailey bridge was constructed. By April 2016, the cost of infrastructure rehabilitation projects reached EC$7 million (US$3 million). Supplementing reconstruction efforts by China and the United Kingdom, the nation's government allocated a further EC$30 million (US$11 million) to enhancing road safety. The Food and Agriculture Organization allocated EC$300,000 (US$110,000) for farmers in October. Through June 2016, the government provided victims with EC$5–6 million (US$1.8–2.2 million), primarily to cover shelters and food.

=== International assistance ===
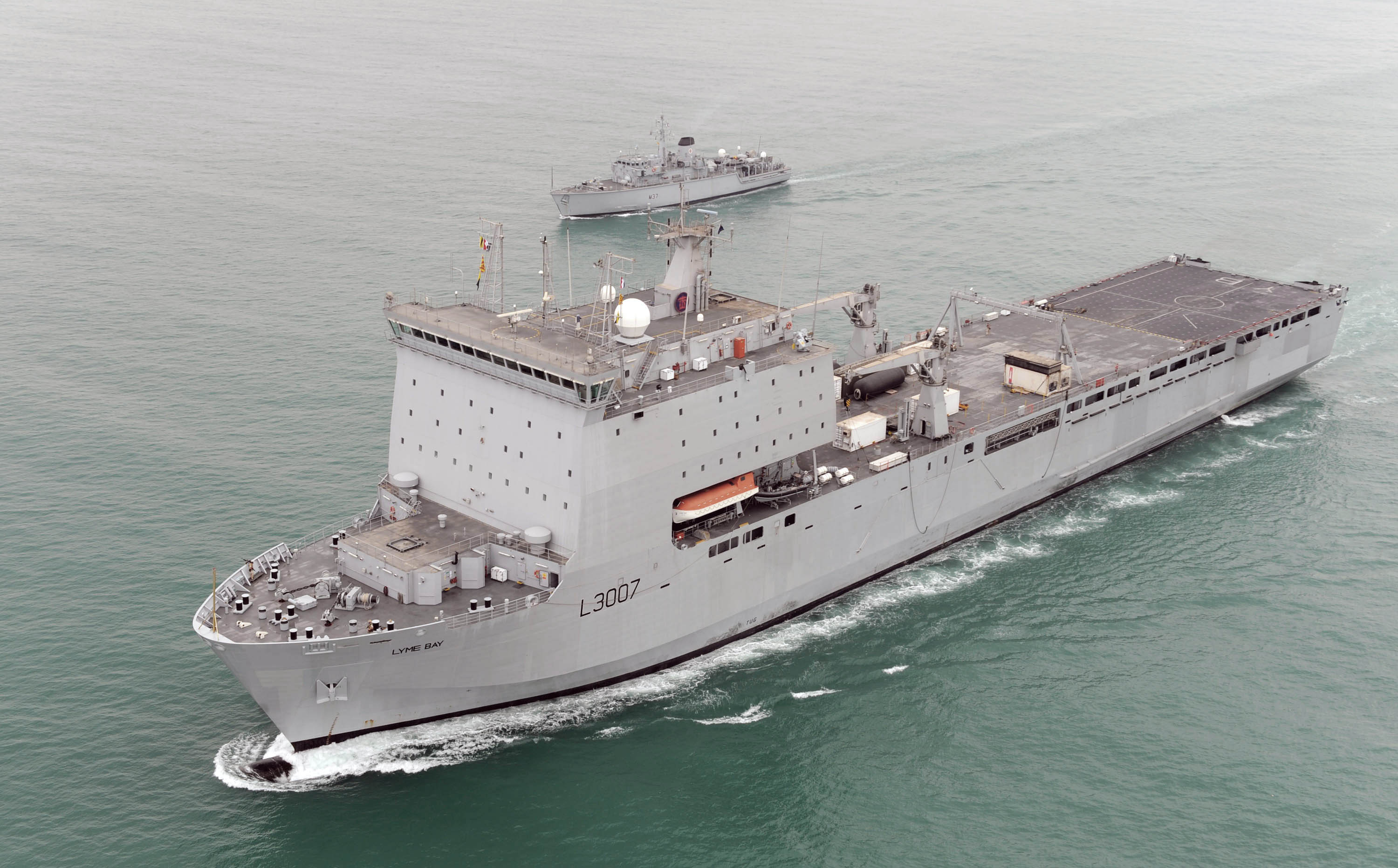
RFA Lyme Bay provided vital assistance to many isolated communities in early September

Within 48 hours of the storm, Governments of Canada, France, the United Kingdom, the United States, the European Union, and various intergovernmental organizations under the United Nations—such as the Pan American Health Organization (PAHO), UNICEF, and United Nations Development Programme—pledged aid; Antigua and Barbuda, Barbados, Montserrat, Saint Lucia, and Trinidad and Tobago provided support teams—firefighters, police, search and rescue, and military personnel—and established supply routes with Dominica. The Caribbean Disaster Emergency Management Agency (CDEMA) pledged assistance to Dominica, offering two helicopters with supplies and medics from Trinidad. Support teams from the CDEMA arrived in Dominica on August 28. The Regional Security System deployed 83 personnel whom conducted search and rescue operations and assisted in the evacuation of hundreds of residents. China and the Caribbean Development Bank offered US$300,000 and US$200,000 in aid, respectively, to the nation. China later provided an additional US$200,000 in October. The Government of Venezuela airlifted 2,000 tons of food and supplies to Dominica and pledged to provide a helicopter carrier ship on August 29. Supplies from Venezuela were bolstered to 10 tons by September 1, and the ship PDV Marina was deployed that day with an additional 13 tons worth fuel, machinery, and other supplies.

Further assistance was provided by the Governments of Cuba, Grenada, and St. Kitts and Nevis by August 31, the latter of which donated EC$1 million (US$368,000). The British-flagged RFA Lyme Bay arrived in Dominica on September 2, carrying medical supplies, marines, and a Lynx Mk.8 helicopter. The helicopter flew 25 flights over a period of five days to isolated communities, providing them with 2 tonnes of supplies daily. More than 20 tonnes of water and 5.3 tonnes of food were provided by RFA Lyme Bay. The Governments of the British Virgin Islands and Taiwan each pledged US$100,000 in funds. Digicel and LIME coordinated restoration efforts to the nation's fiber-optic networks. The former requested donations from 32 countries while the latter assisted in establishing supply routes to isolated communities. Digical also partnered with the Dominican Red Cross, paying for transportation so relief teams could access isolated towns.

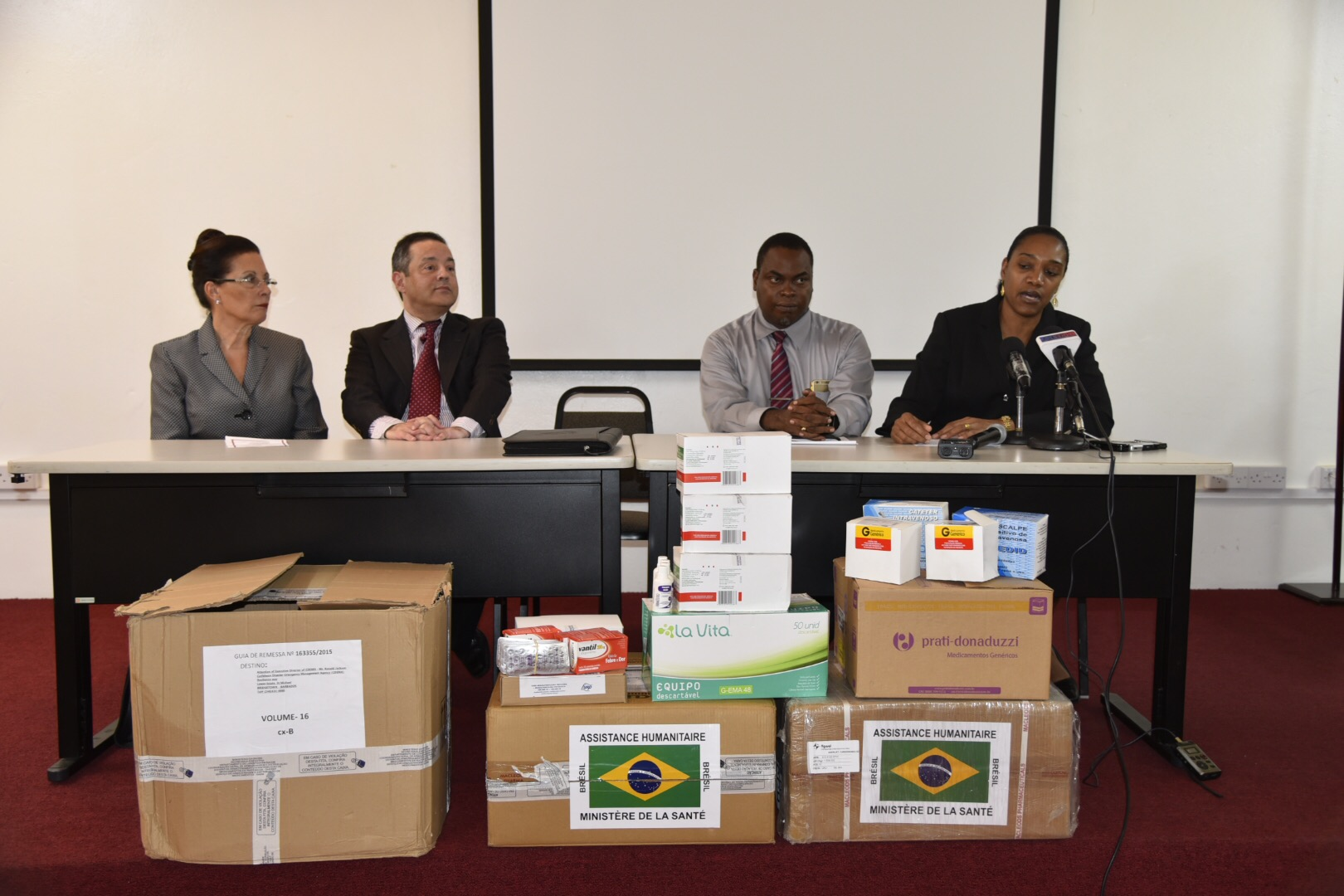
Brazil provided medical supplies (pictured) in October 2015 to the disaster-struck nation

The Government of the Cayman Islands donated US$500,000 and requested residents of the territory to donate supplies. Japan's government provided US$100,000-worth of generators, water purifiers, and water tanks through the Japan International Cooperation Agency. Japan later signed a US1.6 million grant for disaster resilience supplies in January 2016. A further TT$5 million (US$784,000) was provided by Trinidad and Tobago. The Government of Guyana provided a shipment of 68 tonnes of rice collected through public and private donations, three times more than targeted. Through its Excess Rainfall Programme, the Caribbean Catastrophe Risk Insurance Facility provided €6.5 million (US$2.4 million) to the Government of Dominica—the maximum payout allowable. Thousands of school supplies, including books and writing utensils, were collected by the Caribbean Community. The Adventist Development and Relief Agency (ADRA), All Hands Volunteers, Convoy of Hope, ChildFund, and the Organization of American States also provided assistance.

The initial response from UNICEF included the distribution of over 600 hygiene kits and 4,000 water purification tablets. Logistical support, namely satellite phones, solar chargers, and laptops, were provided by the International Telecommunication Union. Four tonnes of medical supplies provided by the PAHO arrived on September 9, and the Government of Brazil supplied additional medical items in October. After an initial release of funds on September 3, the International Federation of Red Cross and Red Crescent Societies launched an emergency appeal on September 10 for approximately US$1 million to assist 12,000 people. The society's relief operation lasted until April 10, 2016, and provided 12,382 people with life-saving assistance. Their primary goal was to restore access to clean water; more than half a million litres of water was provided during the seven-month operation. In regards to health, psychosocial support was made available to 873 people, roughly half of the original goal. Hygiene awareness and distribution of kits proved successful, with all 1,000 kits supplied to those in need. The Dominican Red Cross mass-promoted the Red Cross First Aid mobile app to 8,000 phones, though only 399 people downloaded it. Cash grants of US$334—by way of Visa debit cards—were provided to 279 families to cover lost property. A total of 1,000 mattresses were provided to survivors and a request for additional beds was made; however, limited funds prevented fulfillment.

In March 2017, the CDEMA approved a €9.6 million (US$10.5 million) plan to address gaps in Dominica's disaster response legislation uncovered during the response to Erika.

=== Reconstruction ===
The destruction of Petite Savanne forced the evacuation of 823 people; the village was later deemed uninhabitable and a new town needed to be built elsewhere. Many were temporarily relocated to the Dominica Grammar School in Roseau; however, members of the public looked upon the evacuees with scorn and insulted them for disrupting their daily lives. Parliamentary Representative Kenneth Darroux pleaded with residents to be understanding and patient with those whom were displaced. Plans for a new settlement were established in February 2016, with plans to build 500–1,000 homes. The government provided displaced residents with EC$1,000 per family to handle rent. Similarly, all residents of Dubique were forced to evacuate; they were relocated to temporary homes in Grand Bay provided by Venezuela. Ten two- and three-bedroom homes were provided by the ADRA. Costs for resettlement and reconstruction exceeded EC$91 million (US$14.3 million). Power was restored to all areas of the nation, except for Petite Savanne and Dubique, by September 28. Restoration to the nation's water system was completed in January 2016; however, permanent systems were still to be constructed.

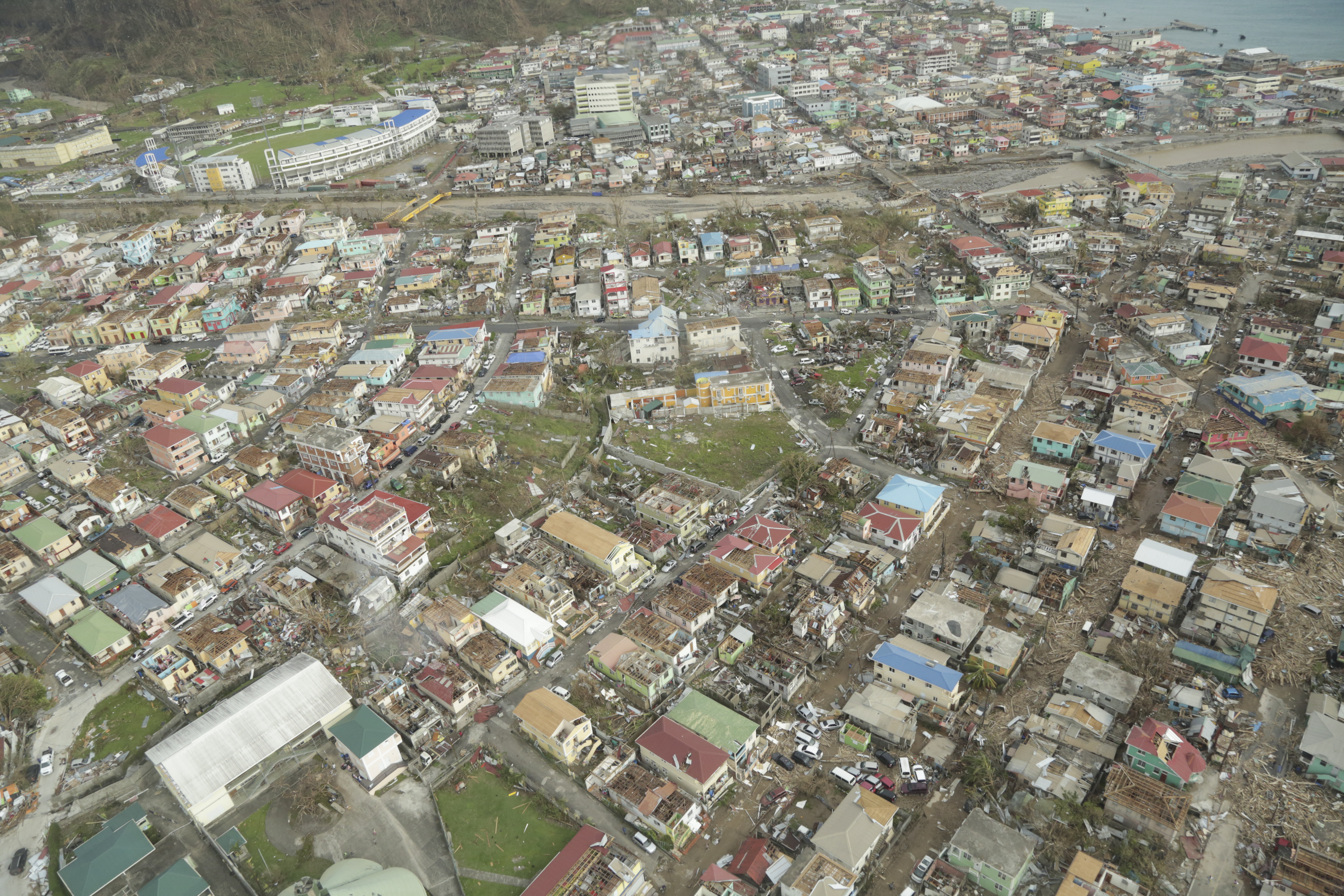
An aerial view of damage inflicted by Hurricane Maria across Roseau in September 2017.

French organizations provided €70,000 (US$77,000) for the reconstruction of two schools. Repair of Douglas–Charles airport was deemed a priority, though the first phase of rehabilitation for runways and aprons took more than a year to complete. In addition to repairs, greater flood defense systems were implemented, including dredging, flood walls, and river training. Construction of 25 planned homes by the ADRA began in February 2016, with projected completion in 2017; 50 volunteers were involved in the project. In April 2016, a library built in 1902 was converted into the "Post Erika Reconstruction Center", spearheaded by Baroness Patricia Scotland. Contracts for roadway repairs between St. Joseph and Layou were signed that month. In November 2016, Dominica signed an agreement with the European Union for an €8.9 million (US$9.6 million) rehabilitation project. In a join Dominica–United Kingdom project, a new road from Loubiere to Bagatelle in southeastern Dominica was announced in March 2017. The EC$100 million (US$37 million) plan would ensure the road could handle heavy rain events, with 12–14 culverts and 3 bridges. Furthermore, road edge failure issues were to be addressed.

On September 18–19, 2017, Hurricane Maria struck Dominica as a Category 5 hurricane, the first such storm of that intensity on record in the nation. An estimated 98 percent of the island's structures were damaged or destroyed and agriculture was devastated. The Assessment Capacities Project estimated total losses of EC$3.69 billion (US$1.37 billion), equal to 226 percent of Dominica's 2016 GDP. A total of 65 fatalities have been confirmed across the island, including 34 who are missing and presumed to be dead.

=== Retirement ===
Because of the storm's severe effects on Dominica, the name Erika was retired by the World Meteorological Organization in April 2016, becoming only the second Atlantic basin retiree that never attained hurricane status, along with 2001's Allison. The name Erika was replaced with Elsa for the 2021 season.

== See also ==
- List of wettest tropical cyclones by country
- Tropical Storm Dorothy (1970)
- Tropical Storm Cindy (1993)
- Tropical Storm Debby (1994)
- Tropical Storm Erika (2009)
- Hurricane Isaias (2020)
- Tropical Storm Philippe (2023)
