= Castle Comfort =

Community in Saint George Parish, Dominica

Coordinates: 15°17′06″N 61°22′26″W

Castle Comfort is a community in Saint George Parish, Dominica. 789 inhabitants live there and in neighbouring Wall House.
