= Bagatelle, Dominica =

Coordinates: 15°14′51″N 61°17′04″W

Bagatelle
- village
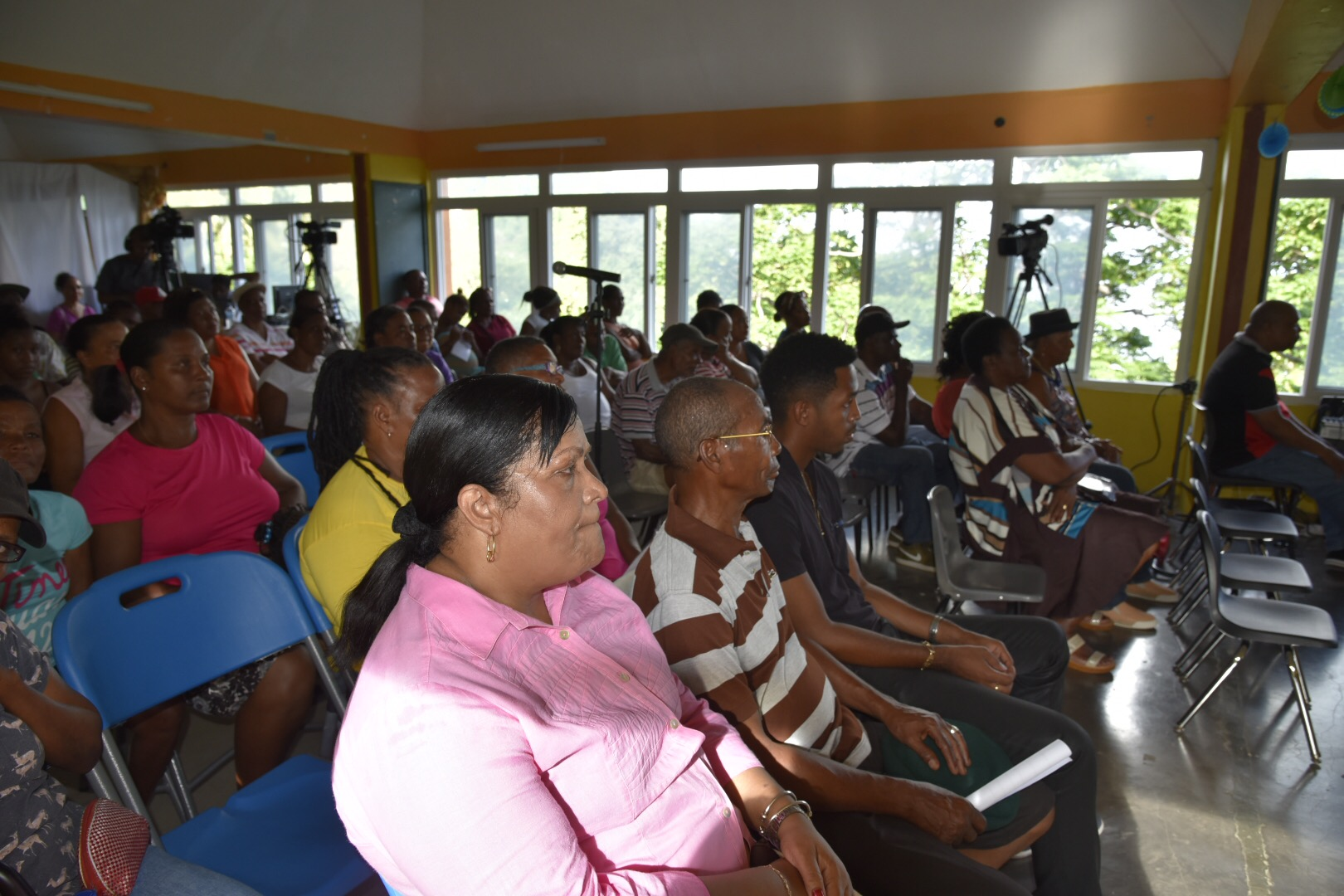
- Bagatelle Town Hall Meeting, July 16, 2017
- Interactive map of Bagatelle
- Parish: Saint Patrick

Bagatelle is a village in Saint Patrick Parish, Dominica.

== History ==
Bagatelle, then known as Malabuca, was first inhabited by the Amerindians before the arrival of the French who changed the name to Bagatelle. It was named after the Château de Bagatelle in Paris. In September 1977, days of heavy rains swept away houses killing thirteen villagers. Two years later, Hurricane David destroyed most of the buildings in the village. The village was rebuilt over the years. In 2021, a 2.3 million dollar bridge was constructed in Bagatelle. In 2024, the Loubiere to Bagatelle Road Rehabilitation Project had its ground-breaking.

== See also ==
- List of towns and villages in Dominica
