= Pointe Michel =

Human settlement in Dominica

Coordinates: 15°15′N 61°23′W

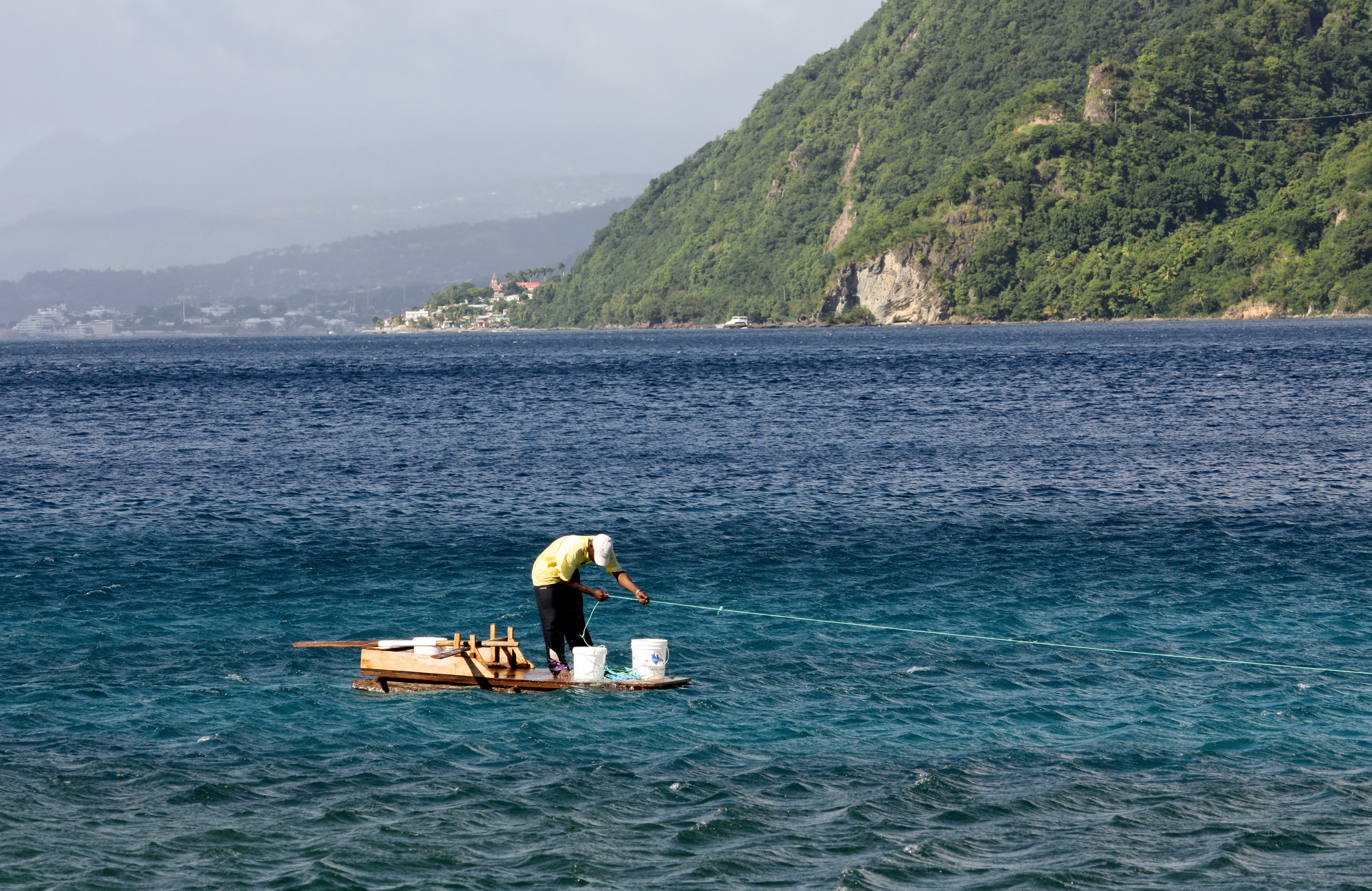
Soufrière Bay off Pointe Michel

Pointe Michel is a small town on the southwest coast of Dominica. It is located to the south of the capital, Roseau.

== Notable people ==
Pointe Michel known for being the birthplace of Dominica's first (and to date only) female Prime Minister, Dame Eugenia Charles.

The actress Alphonsia Emmanuel was born here in 1956.

== Sources ==
- Crask, Paul, 2007: Dominica, p. 103. Chalfont St Peter: Bradt Travel Guides
