= Saint Patrick Parish, Dominica =

Saint Patrick
- Parish
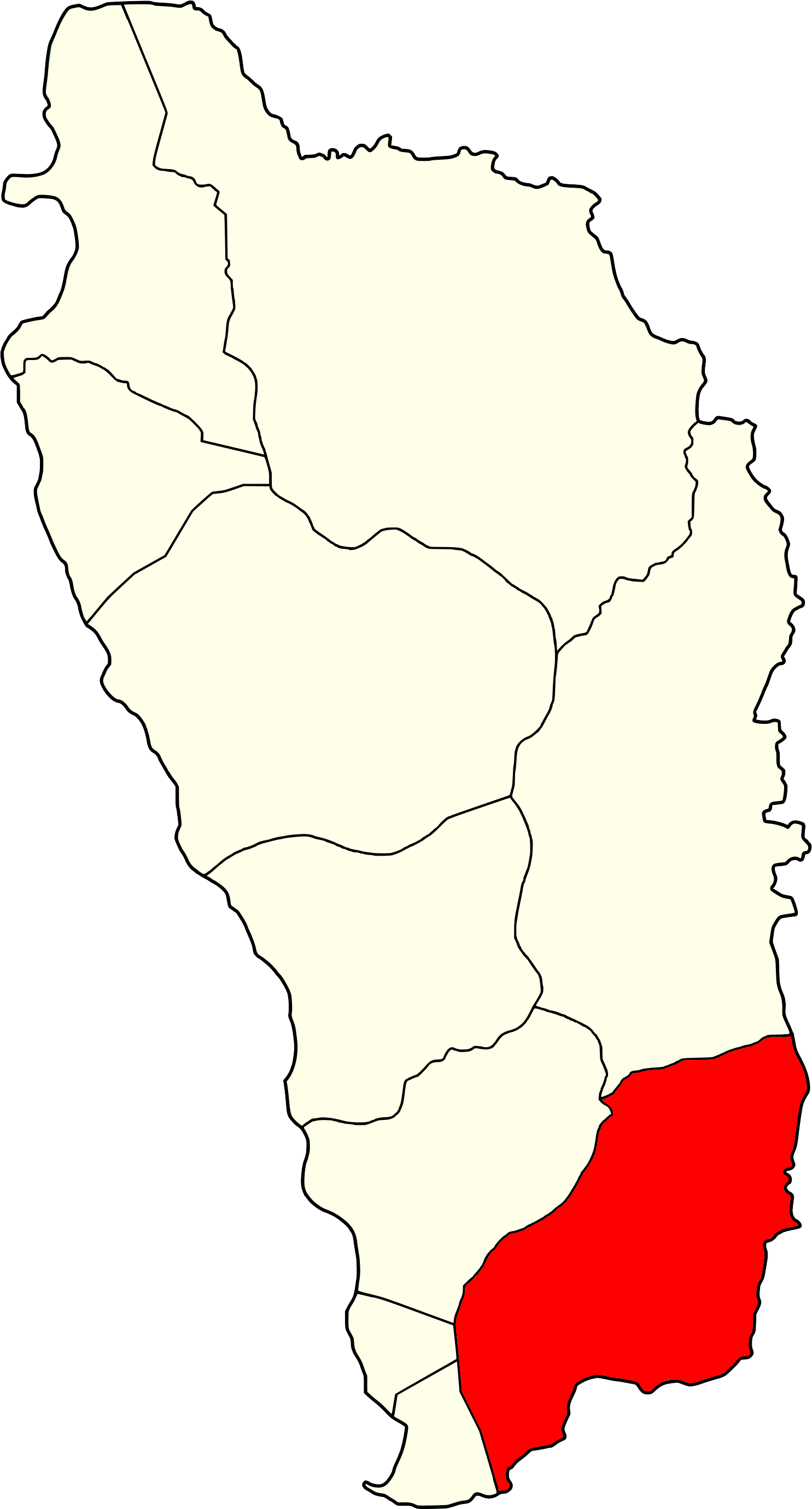
- Country: Dominica
- Capital: Berekua

Area
  - Total: 87.5 km^{2} (33.8 sq mi)

Population (2011)
  - Total: 7,622
  - Density: 87.1/km^{2} (226/sq mi)
- Time zone: UTC-4
- ISO 3166-2: DM-09

Saint Patrick is one of Dominica's 10 administrative parishes. It is bordered by St. George, St. Luke and St. Mark to the west, and St. David to the north. It has an area of 84.4 km² (32.59 mi²), and has a population of 8,383.

Grand Bay (also known as Berekua) and La Plaine are the largest settlements in the parish. Other villages include:

- Bagatelle
- Bellevue Chopin (also in St. George)
- Boetica
- Bordeaux
- Delices
- Dubuc
- Fond St. Jean
- Geneva
- Hagley
- Montine
- Petite Savanne
- Pichelin
- Pointe Caribe
- Ravine Banane
- Stowe
- Tete Morne
- La Plaine
