= Saint Peter Parish, Dominica =

Saint Peter
- Parish
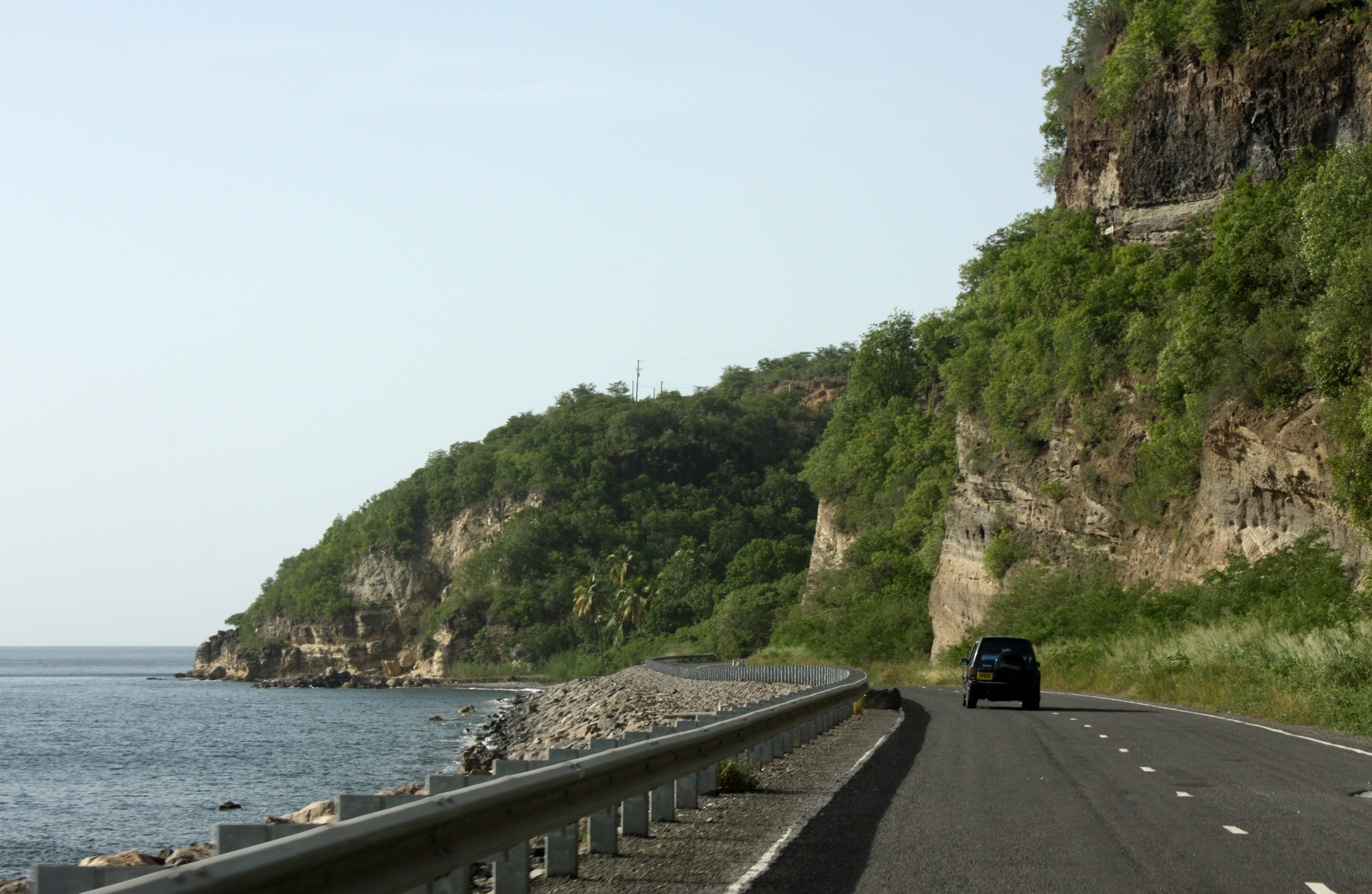

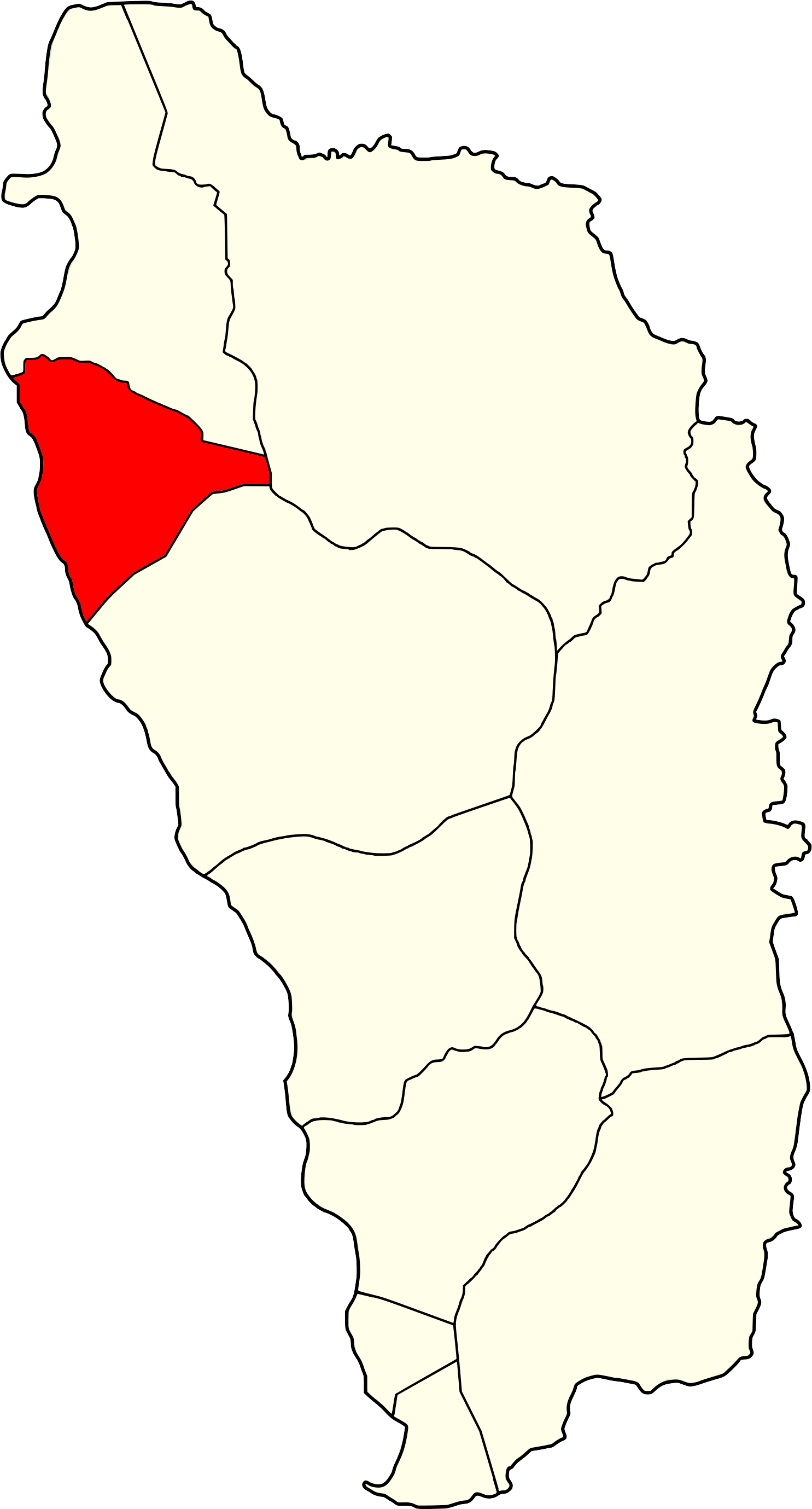
- Country: Dominica
- Capital: Colihaut

Area
  - Total: 32.6 km^{2} (12.6 sq mi)

Population (2011)
  - Total: 1,430
  - Density: 43.9/km^{2} (114/sq mi)
- Time zone: UTC-4
- ISO 3166-2: DM-11

Saint Peter is one of Dominica's 10 administrative parishes. It is bordered by St. John to the north, St. Joseph to the south, and St. Andrew to the east. It has an area of 27.7 km² (10.74 mi²), and has a population of 1,452, the least populous parish of Dominica. Colihaut (the largest village), Dublanc and Bioche are its only settlements.
