= Saint Luke Parish, Dominica =

Saint Luke
- Parish
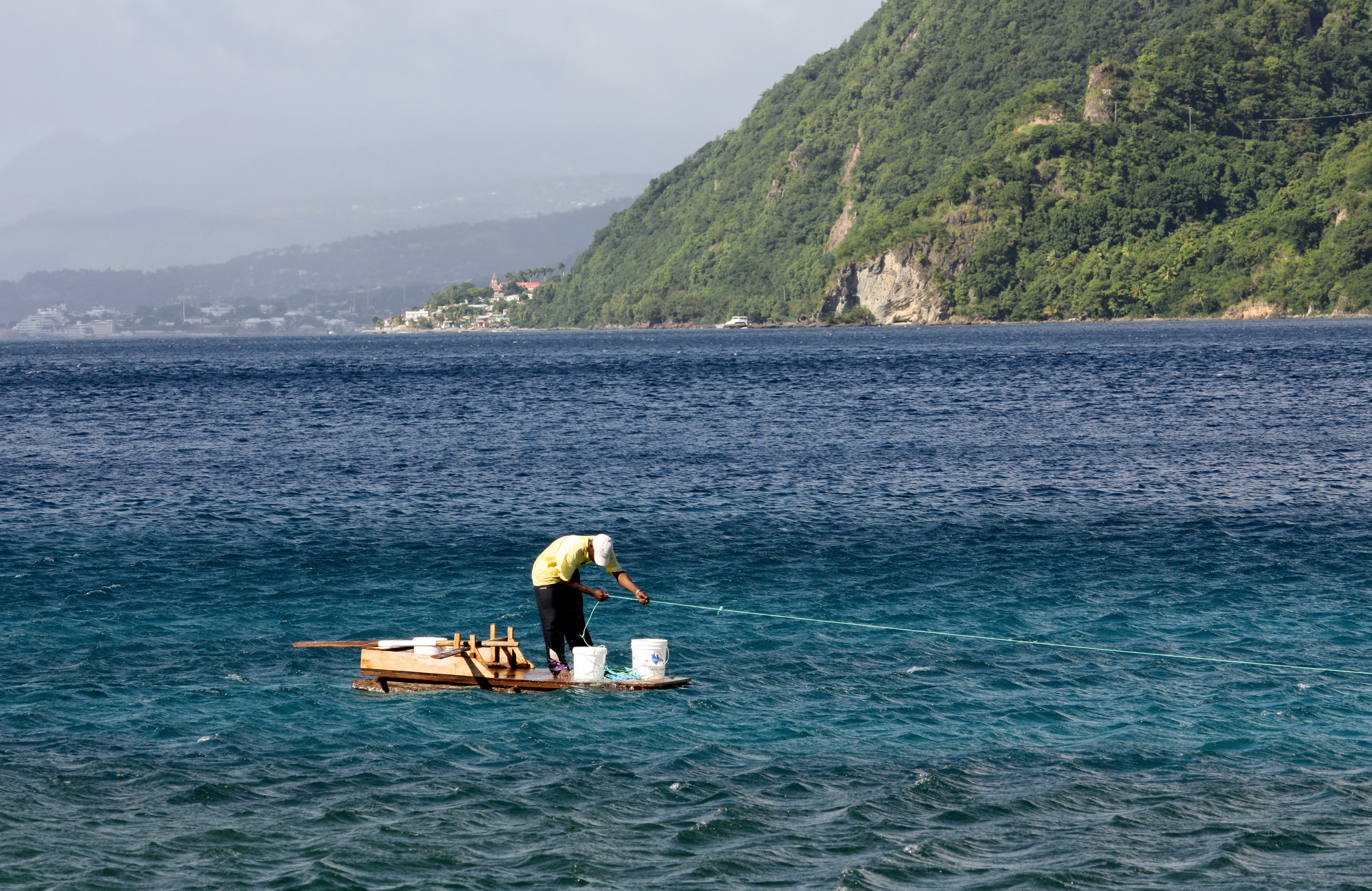
- Soufrière Bay off Pointe Michel

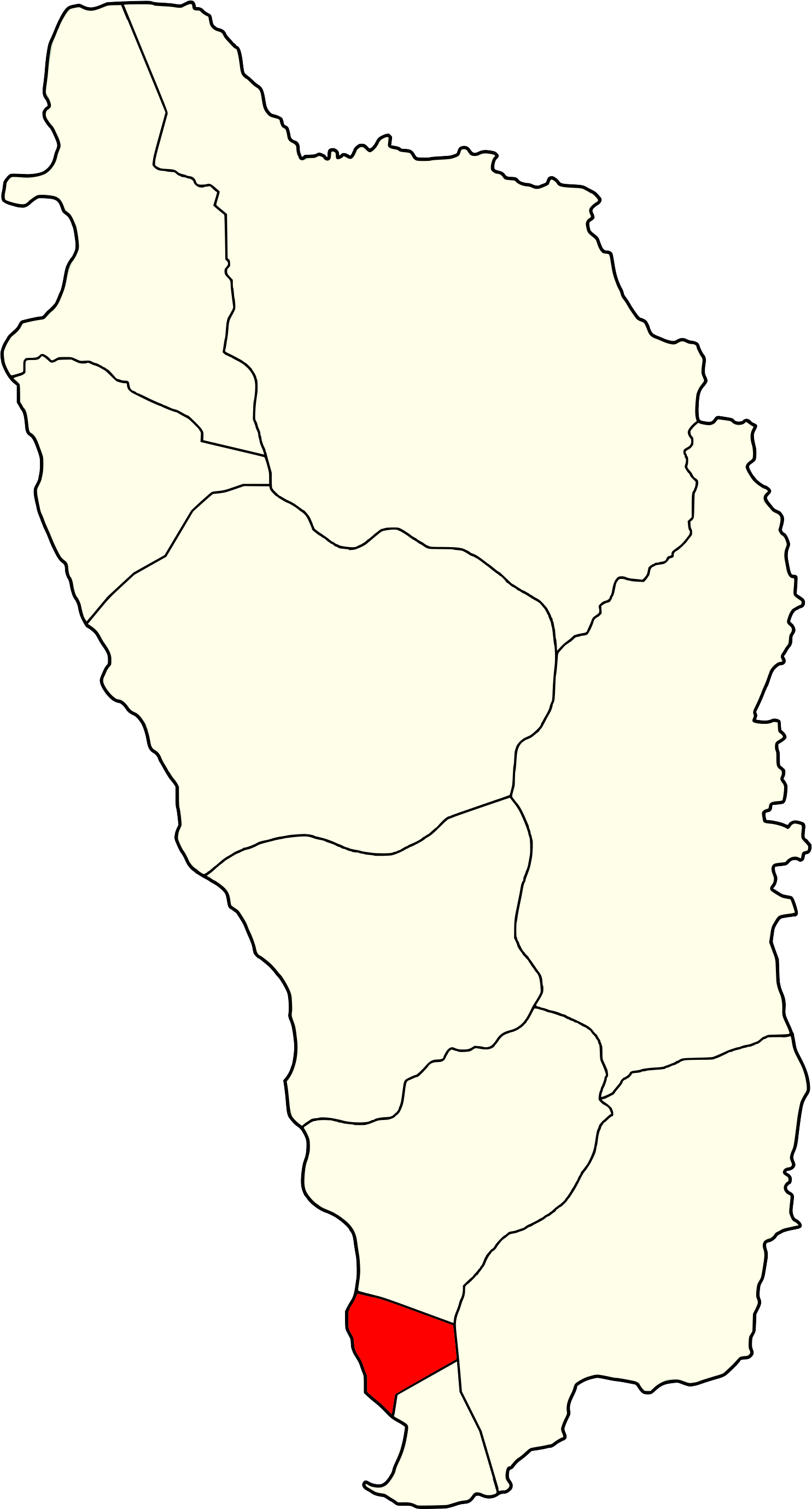
- Country: Dominica
- Capital: Pointe Michel

Area
  - Total: 7.8 km^{2} (3.0 sq mi)

Population (2011)
  - Total: 1,668
  - Density: 210/km^{2} (550/sq mi)
- Time zone: UTC-4
- ISO 3166-2: DM-07

Saint Luke is one of Dominica's 10 administrative parishes. It is bordered by St. George to the north, St. Mark to the south, and St. Patrick to the east.

The parish is the smallest one in Dominica by area and population. 1,668 people live in its 7.77 km^{2} (3 mi^{2}) of area. Pointe Michel (La Pointe) is its only settlement.

Its shape resembles a wedge pointing right, with the top part cut off.
