= Saint George Parish, Dominica =

Saint George
- Parish
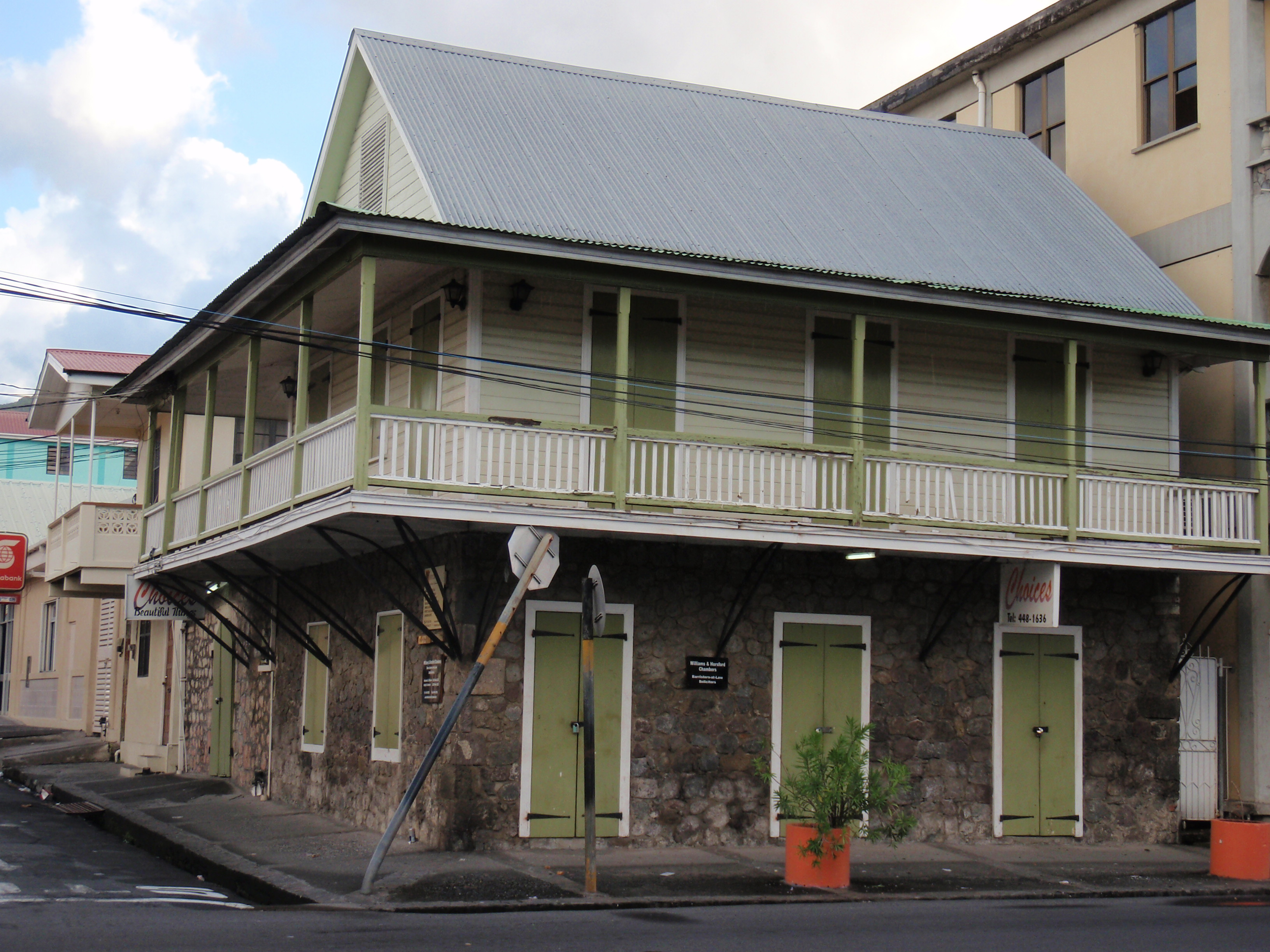
- Roseau's French Quarter

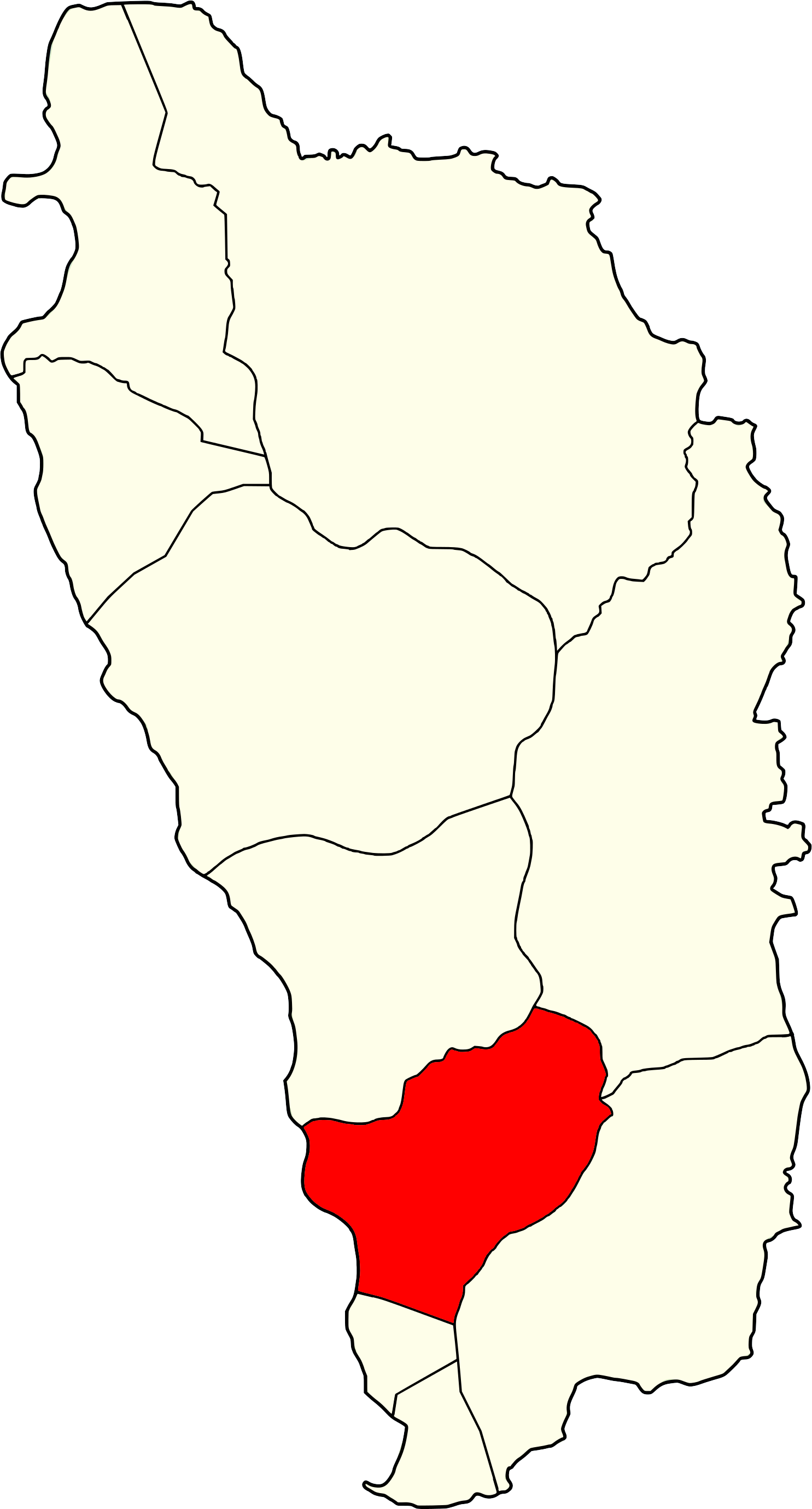
- Country: Dominica
- Capital: Roseau

Area
  - Total: 56.2 km^{2} (21.7 sq mi)

Population (2011)
  - Total: 21,241
  - Density: 378/km^{2} (979/sq mi)
- Time zone: UTC-4
- ISO 3166-2: DM-04

Saint George is one of Dominica's 10 administrative parishes. It is bordered by Saint Paul and part of the Boeri River (to the north), Saint David and Saint Patrick (to the east), Saint Luke (to the south).

The parish has an area of 56.1 km² (21.67 mi²), and has a population of 20,211.

== Roseau ==
The capital city of Dominica, Roseau, is in this parish, as well as its suburbs:

- Bath Estate
- Elmshall
- Kings Hill
- Copthall
- Newtown (once Charlotteville)
- Castle Comfort
- Goodwill
- Potters Ville
- Stock Farm
- Tarish Pit
- Yam Piece
- Belle Vue Rawle
- Fond Colé

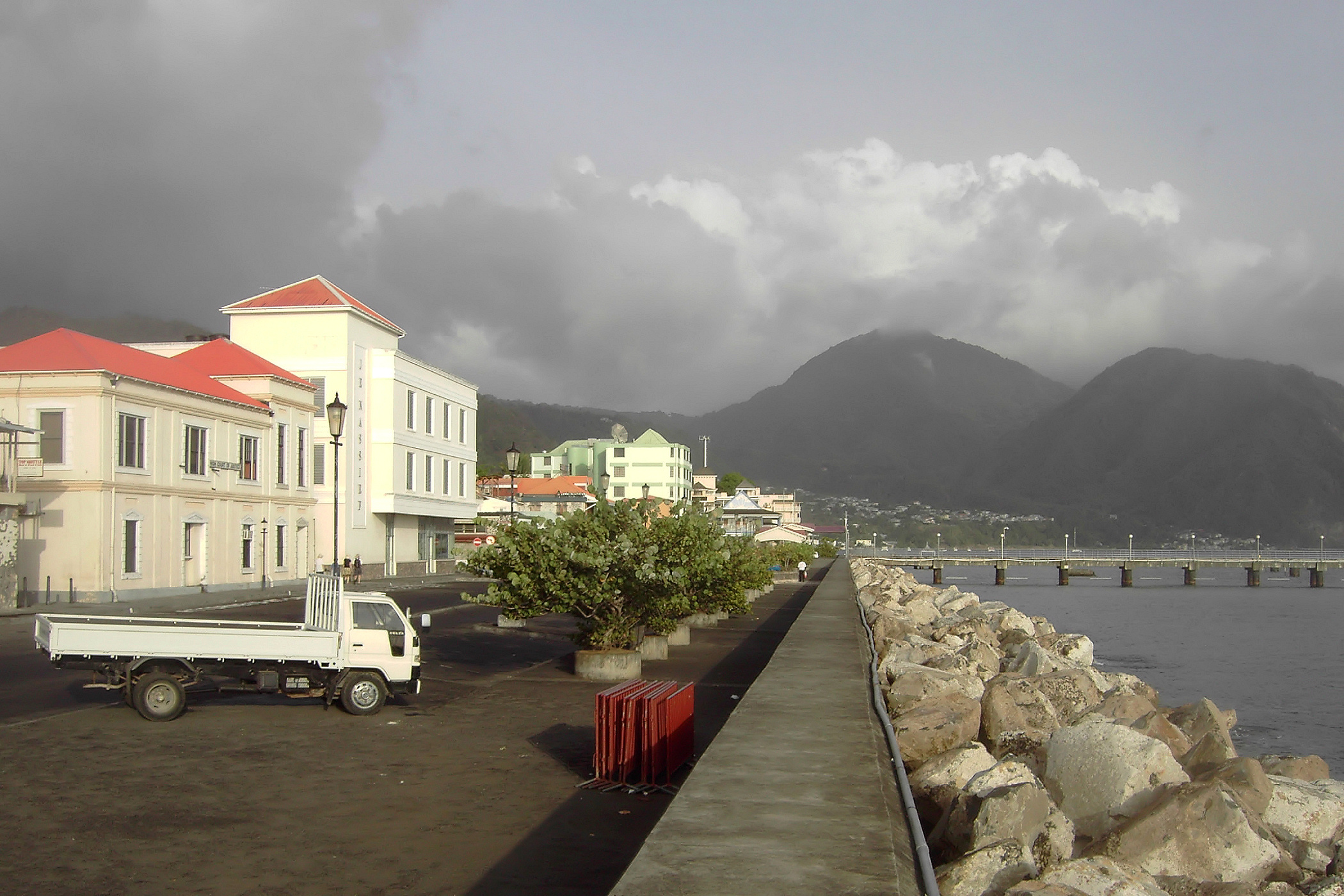
Roseau

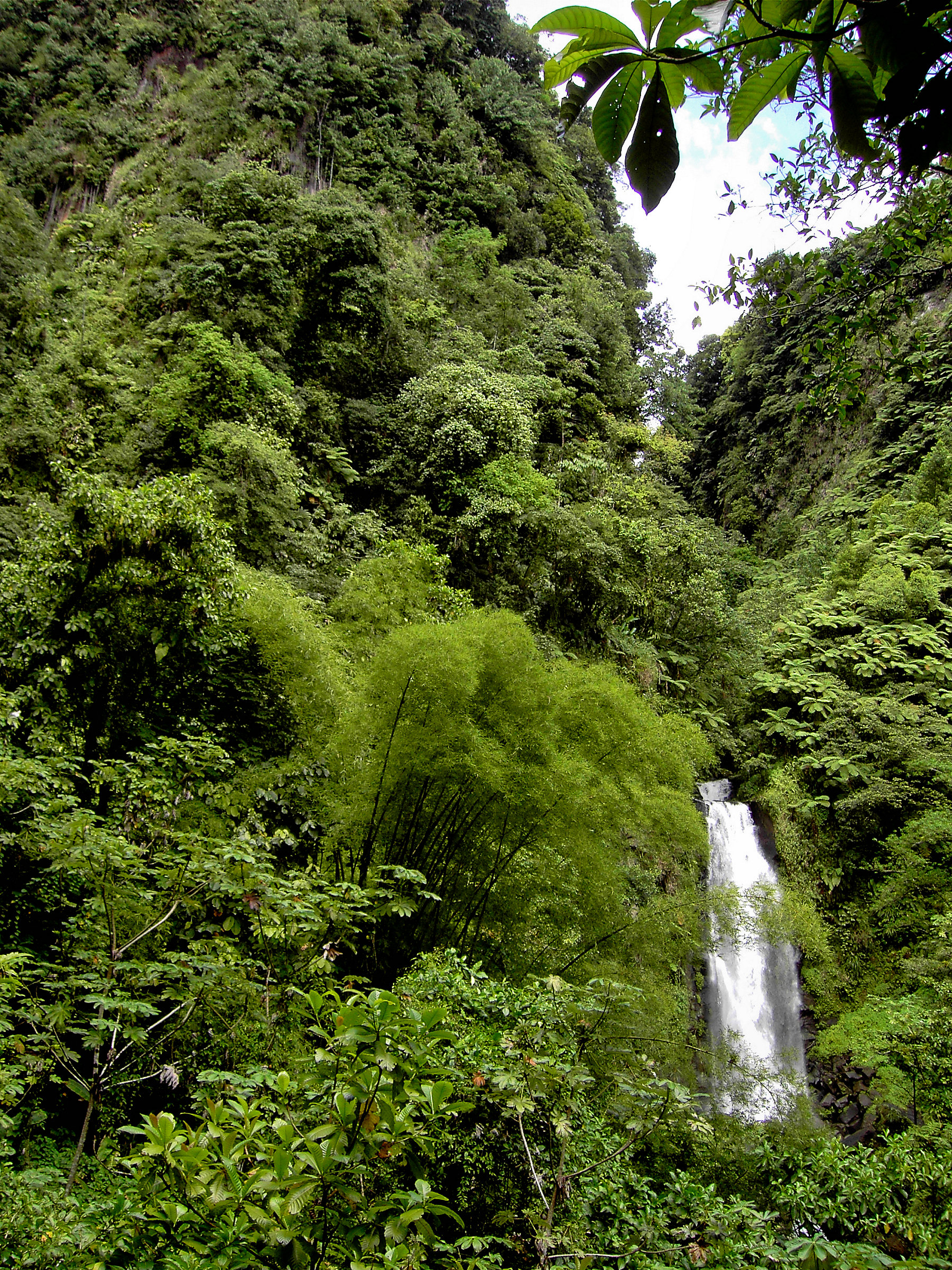
Rainforest at Trafalgar Falls

== Other settlements ==
(all villages)

- Bellevue Chopin
- Eggleston
- Fond Cani
- Giraudel
- Laudat
- Loubiere
- Louisville
- Morne Prosper
- Trafalgar
- Wotten Waven
