= Saint Mark Parish, Dominica =

Saint Mark
- Parish
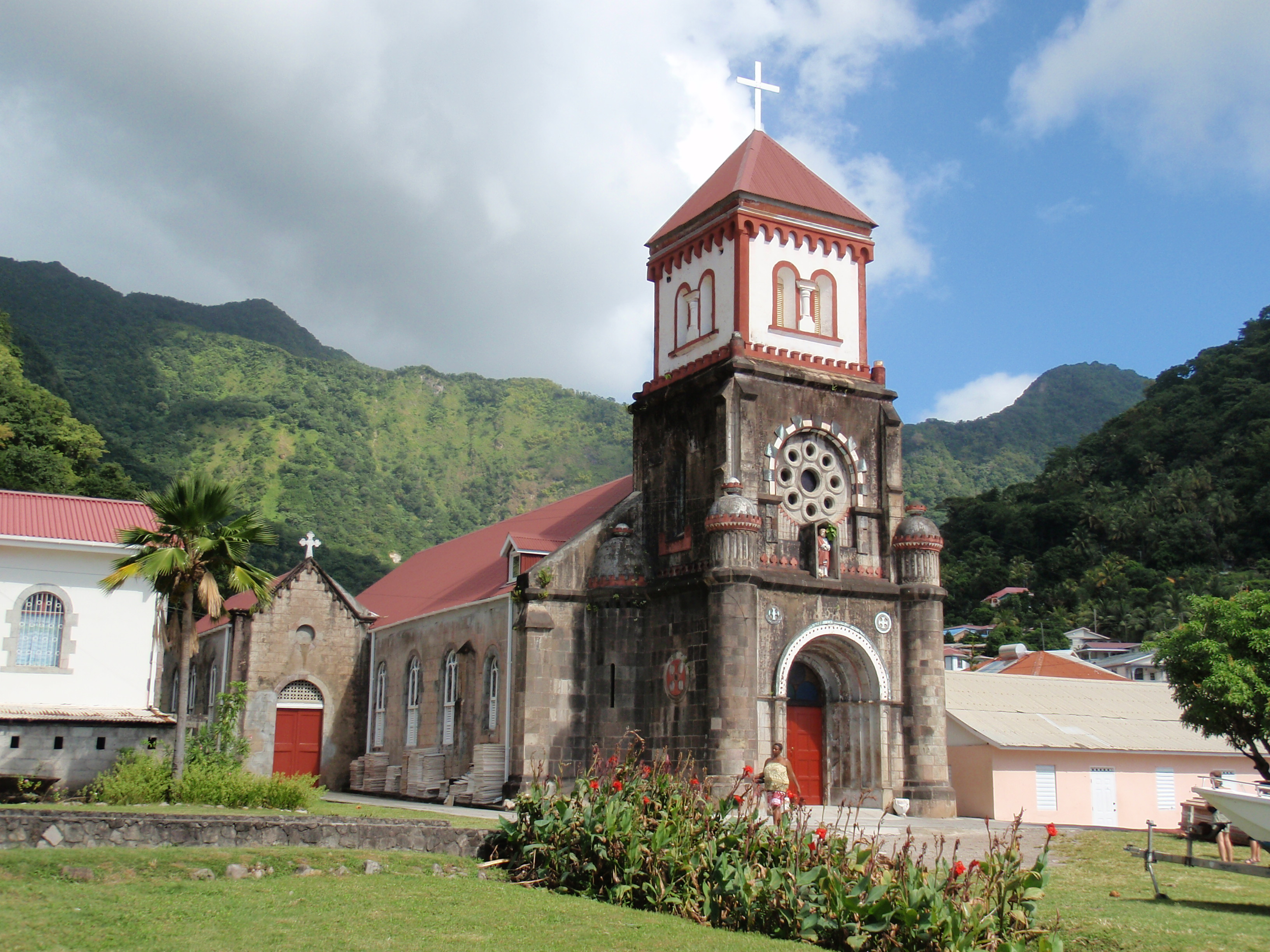
- Church in Soufrière

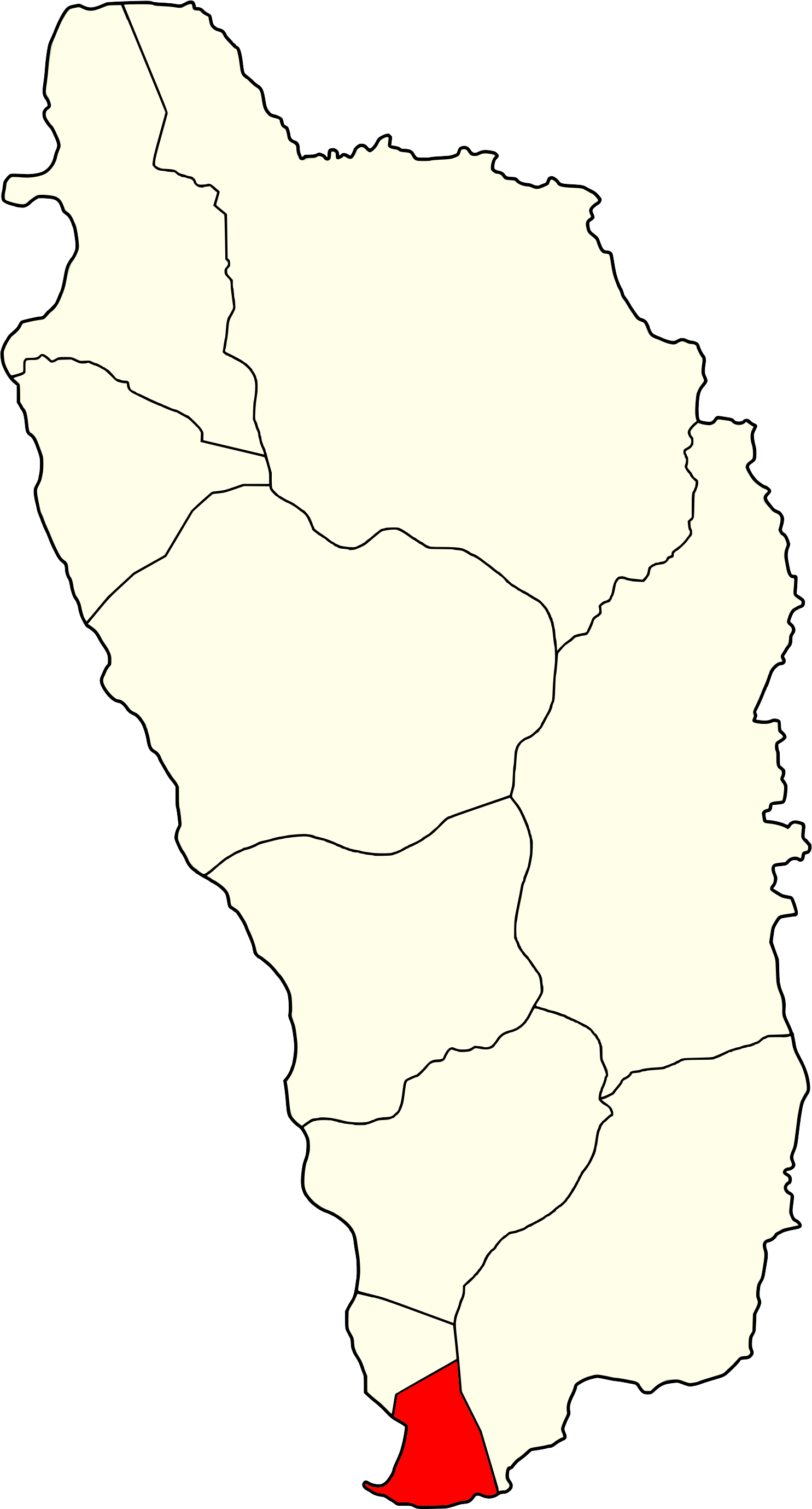
- Country: Dominica
- Capital: Soufrière

Area
  - Total: 10.4 km^{2} (4.0 sq mi)

Population (2011)
  - Total: 1,834
  - Density: 176/km^{2} (457/sq mi)
- Time zone: UTC-4
- ISO 3166-2: DM-08

Saint Mark is one of Dominica's ten administrative parishes (Dominica is in the Lesser Antilles). It is bordered by St. Luke (to the north) and St. Patrick (to the east). With an area of 9.9 km² (3.8 mi²), it is the second smallest in the island. It had a population of 1,767 people at the Population Census of 2011.

The main settlements in the parish are Soufrière and Scotts Head (near which the only tombolo in the West Indies can be found). Another village in the parish is Galion.
