= Parishes of Dominica =

Map of the parishes of Dominica

Dominica is divided into ten parishes. The largest parish by population in Dominica is Saint George which contains the capital city Roseau and has a total population of 21,241. The smallest parish by population is Saint Peter with 1,430 residents. The largest parish by land area is Saint Andrew which spans 179.9 km^{2} (69.5 sq mi), while Saint Luke is the smallest at 10.8 km^{2} (4.2 sq mi).

== Parishes ==
Name	Capital	Population (2011)	Population (2001)	Change	Land area	Population density
Saint Andrew	Marigot	9,471	10,250	−7.60%	179.9 km^{2} (69.5 sq mi)	52.6/km^{2}
Saint David	Castle Bruce	6,043	6,758	−10.58%	125.8 km^{2} (48.6 sq mi)	48.0/km^{2}
Saint George	Roseau*	21,241	19,863	+6.94%	56.2 km^{2} (21.7 sq mi)	378.0/km^{2}
Saint John	Portsmouth	6,561	5,322	+23.28%	59.1 km^{2} (22.8 sq mi)	111.0/km^{2}
Saint Joseph	Saint Joseph	5,637	5,770	−2.31%	118.4 km^{2} (45.7 sq mi)	47.6/km^{2}
Saint Luke	Pointe Michel	1,668	1,569	+6.31%	10.8 km^{2} (4.2 sq mi)	154.4/km^{2}
Saint Mark	Soufrière	1,834	1,909	−3.93%	13.5 km^{2} (5.2 sq mi)	135.9/km^{2}
Saint Patrick	Berekua	7,622	8,451	−9.81%	86.7 km^{2} (33.5 sq mi)	87.9/km^{2}
Saint Paul	Pont Cassé	9,786	8,435	+16.02%	66.4 km^{2} (25.6 sq mi)	147.4/km^{2}
Saint Peter	Colihaut	1,430	1,448	−1.24%	34.2 km^{2} (13.2 sq mi)	41.8/km^{2}

== See also ==
- ISO 3166-2:DM
- List of Caribbean First-level Subdivisions by Total Area
- Commonwealth Local Government Forum-Americas
