= List of members of the House of Assembly of Dominica =

The members of the House of Assembly of Dominica comprise 21 Representatives, 9 Senators, and the Speaker of the House and Attorney General.

== Political parties ==
- DLP - Dominica Labour Party
- UWP - United Workers' Party
- PPOD - People's Party of Dominica

== 2019–Present ==
=== Representatives ===
| Constituency | Representative | Party | Notes |
|---|---|---|---|
| Castle Bruce | Octavia Alfred | DLP | |
| Colihaut | Catherine Daniel | DLP | |
| Cottage | Reginald Victor Austrie | DLP | |
| Grand Bay | Edward Registe | DLP | |
| La Plaine | Kent Edwards | DLP | |
| Mahaut | Rayburn John Blackmoore | DLP | |
| Marigot | Lennox Linton | UWP | |
| Morne Jaune/Riviere Cyrique | Gretta Bernadette Roberts | DLP | |
| Paix Bouche | Roselyn Paul | DLP | |
| Petite Savanne | Kenneth Melchoir Darroux | DLP | |
| Portsmouth | Ian Douglas | DLP | |
| Roseau Central | Melissa Ponponne Skerrit | DLP | |
| Roseau North | Daniel Lugay | UWP | |
| Roseau South | Chekira Lockhart Hypolite | DLP | |
| Roseau Valley | Irving Francis McIntyre | DLP | |
| Salisbury | Hector John | UWP | |
| Salybia | Cozier Frederick | DLP | |
| St. Joseph | Adis King | DLP | |
| Soufrière | Denise Charles | DLP | Succeeded Ian Pinard in 2016 by-election. |
| Vieille Case | Roosevelt Skerrit | DLP | Assumed position of Prime Minister 8 January 2004. |
| Wesley | Fidel Grant | DLP | |

=== Senators ===
| Senator | Party | Notes |
|---|---|---|
| Ernie Lawrence Jno Finn | UWP | Appointed by Leader of the Opposition. |
| Cassanni Laville | DLP | Appointed by Prime Minister. |
| Oscar George | DLP | Appointed by Prime Minister. |
| Francisca Joseph | UWP | Appointed by Leader of the Opposition. |
| Anette Sanford | UWP | Appointed by Leader of the Opposition. |
| Gregory Riviere | DLP | Appointed by Prime Minister. |
| Clement Marcellin Jr. | UWP | Appointed by Leader of the Opposition. |
| Phillip Role | DLP | Appointed by Prime Minister. |
| Nicholas Esprit | DLP | Appointed by Prime Minister. |

== 2009–2014 ==
=== Representatives ===
| Constituency | Representative | Party | Notes |
|---|---|---|---|
| Castle Bruce | Johnson Drigo | DLP | |
| Colihaut | Ronald Toulon | DLP | |
| Cottage | Reginald Victor Austrie | DLP | |
| Grand Bay | Justina Charles | DLP | |
| La Plaine | Petter Saint-Jean | DLP | |
| Mahaut | Rayburn John Blackmoore | DLP | |
| Marigot | Edison James | UWP | Seat declared vacant in April 2010. Won seat back in 9 July 2010 by-election. |
| Morne Jaune/Riviere Cyrique | Ivor Stephenson | DLP | |
| Paix Bouche | Matthew Joseph Walter | DLP | |
| Petite Savanne | Kenneth Melchoir Darroux | DLP | |
| Portsmouth | Ian Douglas | DLP | |
| Roseau Central | Norris Prevost | UWP | |
| Roseau North | Julius C. Timothy | DLP | |
| Roseau South | Ambrose George | DLP | |
| Roseau Valley | John Collin McIntyre | DLP | |
| Salisbury | Hector John | UWP | Seat declared vacant in April 2010. Won seat back in 9 July 2010 by-election. Sworn in as Leader of the Opposition on 19 July 2010. |
| Salybia | Ashton Graneau | DLP | |
| St. Joseph | Kelver Dwight Darroux | DLP | |
| Soufrière | Sam Edward Martin | DLP | |
| Vieille Case | Roosevelt Skerrit | DLP | Assumed position of Prime Minister 8 January 2004. |
| Wesley | Gloria Marilyn Shillingford | DLP | |

=== Senators ===
Due to the opposition boycott of the House of Assembly, only five senators were initially appointed.

| Senator | Party | Notes |
|---|---|---|
| Dayton Baptiste | DLP | Appointed by the Prime Minister, sworn in on 4 January 2010. Resigned to run as a candidate in the 2010 by-election. |
| Ezekiel Bazil | UWP | Appointed by the Opposition Leader on 5 August 2010. |
| Alvin Bernard | DLP | Appointed by the Prime Minister, sworn in on 4 January 2010. |
| Ron Green | UWP | Appointed by the Opposition Leader on 5 August 2010. |
| Ronnie Isidore | UWP | Appointed by the Opposition Leader on 5 August 2010. |
| Tammy Jean-Jacques | DLP | Appointed by the Prime Minister, sworn in on 4 January 2010. |
| Daniel Lugay | UWP | Appointed by the Opposition Leader on 25 October 2011, to replace Claudius Sanford. |
| Bentley Royer | DLP | Appointed by the Prime Minister, sworn in on 4 January 2010. Resigned to run as a candidate in the 2010 by-election. |
| Claudius Sanford | UWP | Appointed by the Opposition Leader on 5 August 2010. Resigned 25 October 2011 to continue his education abroad. |
| Charles Savarin | DLP | Appointed by the Prime Minister, sworn in on 4 January 2010. |

=== Speaker of the House ===
- Alix Boyd Knights

== 2005–2009 ==
=== Representatives ===
| Constituency | Representative | Party |
|---|---|---|
| Castle Bruce | Loreen Bannis-Roberts | DLP |
| Colihaut | Ronald Toulon | DLP |
| Cottage | Reginald Austrie | DLP |
| Grand Bay | John Fabien | DLP |
| La Plaine | Ronald Green | UWP |
| Mahaut | Rayburn Blackmoore | DLP |
| Marigot | Edison James | UWP |
| Morne Jaune | Abraham Browne | UWP |
| Paix Bouche | Matthew Walter | DLP |
| Petite Savanne | Urban Baron | DLP |
| Portsmouth | Ian Douglas | DLP |
| Roseau Central | Norris Prevost | UWP |
| Roseau North | Julius Timothy | DLP |
| Roseau South | Ambrose George | DLP |
| Roseau Valley | Norris Charles | UWP |
| Salisbury | Earl Williams | UWP |
| Salybia | Kelly Graneau | DLP |
| Soufrière | Ian Pinard | DLP |
| St. Joseph | Vince Henderson | DLP |
| Vieille Case | Roosevelt Skerrit | DLP |
| Wesley | Peter Carbon | UWP |

=== Senators ===
| Senator | Party |
|---|---|
| Nicholls Espirit | UWP |
| Dr. Colin McIntyre | DLP |
| Maynard Nicholas | UWP |
| Claudius Sanford | UWP |
| Charles Savarin | DLP |
| Gloria Shillingford | DLP |
| Peter St. Jean | DLP |
| Sabina Williams | UWP |
| Sonia Williams | DLP |

=== Speaker of the House ===
- Alix Boyd Knights
