= List of people from Dominica =

Commonwealth of Dominica

Flag

Coat of Arms

This is a list of notable people from the Commonwealth of Dominica. People in this list were born on, lived in, or contributed significantly to Dominica.

== Culture ==
S J Celestine Edwards c.1894

=== Actors ===
- Alphonsia Emmanuel (born 1956), British actress born in Dominica.
- Dwain Murphy, Canadian actor born in Dominica.
- Henry Wilcoxon (1905 - 1984), British actor born in Dominica.

=== Artists ===
- Alwin Bully (1948 - 2023), actor, artist, politician in Dominica.
- Tam Joseph (born 1947), British artist born in Dominica.
- Pauline Marcelle (born 1964), artist born in Dominica.

=== Musicians ===
- Eric Allandale (1936 - 2001), trombonist and songwriter from Dominica.
- Cissie Caudeiron (1909 - 1968), folklorist writer and musician from Dominica.
- Lemuel McPherson Christian (1913 - 2000), musician who wrote the national anthem of Dominica.
- Pearle Christian (born 1955), composer, music educator.
- Exile One, Dominican band.
- Nasio Fontaine, reggae artist from Dominica.
- The Gaylords, band from Dominica.
- Gramacks, formed in 1972, cadence-lypso band from Dominica.
- Michele Henderson (born c 1980), singer and songwriter from Dominica.
- Lazo, musician born on Dominica.
- Lord Tokyo (1934 - 2015), calypso singer from Dominica.
- Ophelia Marie (born 1951), singer from Dominica.
- Swinging Stars, Dominican band formed in 1959.
- Windward Caribbean Kulture ("WCK"), Dominican band formed in 1988.

=== Writers ===
- Celestine Edwards (c. 1858 - 1894), Dominican writer, speaker and activist.
- Lennox Honychurch (born 1952), historian known for The Dominica Story.
- Elma Napier (1892 - 1973), novelist who lived in Dominica.
- Jean Rhys (1890 - 1979), novelist born in Dominica.
- Julian Jay Savarin (born 1950), author and songwriter born in Dominica.
- Edward Scobie (1918 - 1996), journalist and historian from Dominica.

== Educators ==
- Donald C. Peters, president of Dominica State College.
- Bentley Royer (born 1955), educator and politician from Dominica.

== Entrepreneurs and business leaders ==
- A. C. Shillingford (1882–1938), Dominican businessman.
- Valda Henry, Dominican banker.

== Politics and government ==
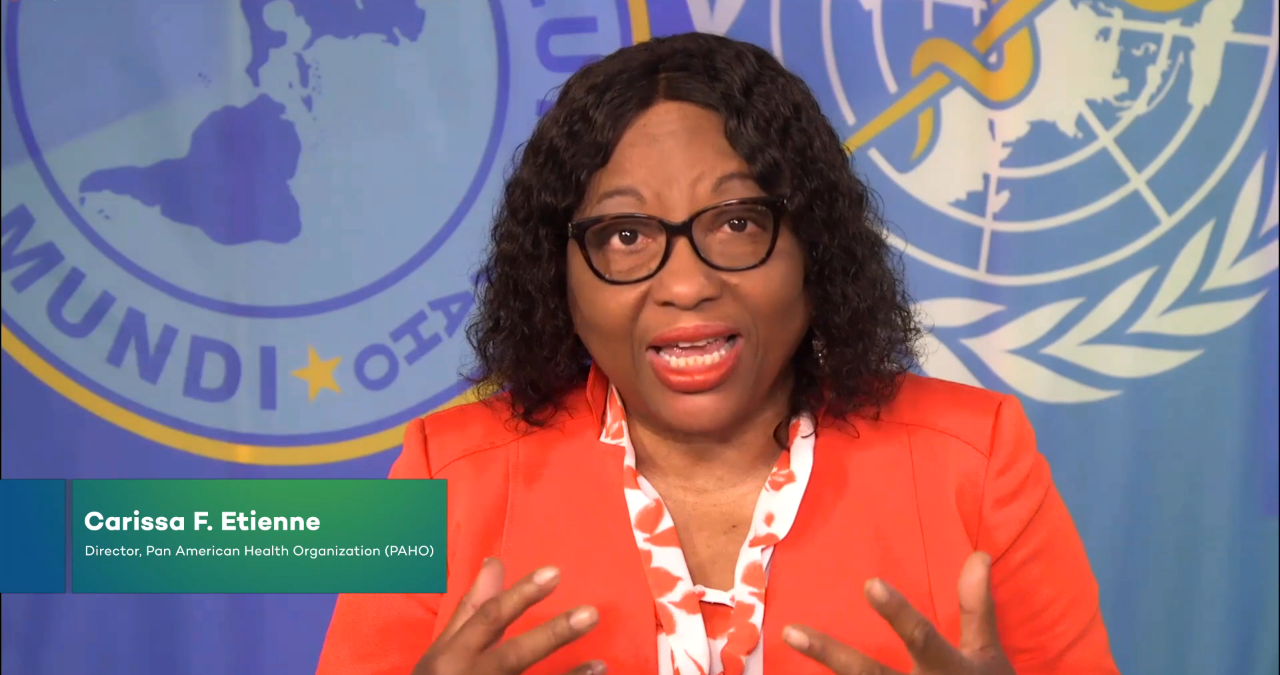
Carissa Etienne in 2020

=== Activists ===
- Phyllis Shand Allfrey (1908–1986), socialist activist, writer and politician from Dominica.
- Carissa Etienne (1952 - 2023), Dominican public health advocate.
- Kellyn George, health activist from Dominica.
- Emmanuel Christopher Loblack (1898–1995), union leader and politician.
- Atherton Martin, activist and environmentalist from Dominica.
- Whitney Mélinard (born 2001), Kalinago Territory activist.
- Asquith Xavier (1920 - 1980), Dominican-born first non-white train guard at Euston railway station.

=== Diplomacy ===
- Hubert J. Charles (born 1948), Dominican diplomat.
- Arden Shillingford (1936 - 2019), Dominican diplomat.

=== Law ===
- Brian George Keith Alleyne (born 1943), Dominican jurist.
- Thomas Atwood (died 1793), judge and writer of The History of the Island of Dominica.
- Sylvia Judith Bertrand (1930 - 2009), civil servant and judge in Dominica.
- Alix Boyd Knights (1944 - 2023), politician and attorney.
- Cecil Rawle (1891–1938), Dominican attorney and politician.
- Cara Shillingford, Dominican attorney.

=== Military ===
- Frederick Newton (1951 - 1986), former head of the Dominican Defense Forces and leader of an attempted coup d'état.

=== Politicians ===
- Octavia Alfred, Dominican politician.
- Michael Astaphan, Dominican politician.
- Reginald Austrie, Dominican politician.
- Vernice Bellony, Dominican politician.
- Alvin Bernard (born 1955), Dominican politician.
- Miriam Blanchard, Dominican politician.
- Sylvanie Burton, Dominican politician.
- Eugenia Charles (1919 - 2005), former prime minister of Dominica.
- Justina Charles, Dominican politician.
- Pierre Charles (1954 - 2004), former prime minister of Dominica.
- Denise Charles-Pemberton, Dominican politician.
- Kenneth Darroux, Dominican politician.
- Rosie Douglas (1941 - 2000), former prime minister of Dominica.
- Sean Douglas, Dominican politician.
- Neva Edwards (born 1931), Dominican politician.
- Ronald Green, Dominican politician.
- Crispin S. Gregoire (born 1956), Dominican diplomat.
- Vince Henderson, Dominican politician.
- Joseph Isaac (born 1969), Dominican politician.
- Edison James (born 1943), former prime minister of Dominica.
- Hector John (born 1970), Dominican politician.
- Patrick John (1936 - 2021), former prime minister of Dominica.
- Adis King, Dominican politician.
- Edward Oliver LeBlanc (1923–2004), government official of Dominica.
- Lennox Linton (born 1956), Dominican politician.
- Nicholas Liverpool (1934 - 2015), former president of Dominica.
- Austelle Lockhart, Dominican politician.
- Chekira Lockhart Hypolite, Dominican politician.
- Charles Maynard, Dominican politician.
- Irving McIntyre, Dominican politician.
- Anthony Moise, Dominican politician.
- Doreen Paul (born 1962), Dominican politician.
- Roselyn Paul, Dominican politician.
- Marie Davis Pierre (1918 - 2014), Dominican politician.
- Gretta Roberts, Dominican politician.
- Loreen Ruth Bannis-Roberts (born 1966), Dominican politician and diplomat.
- Charles Savarin (born 1943), former president of Dominica.
- Patricia Scotland (born 1955), politician born in Dominica.
- Clarence Seignoret (1919 - 2002), former president of Dominica.
- Oliver Seraphin (born 1943), Dominican politician.
- Vernon Shaw (1930 - 2013), former president of Dominica.
- Gloria Shillingford, Dominican politician.
- H. D. Shillingford (1888 - 1975), Dominican politician.
- Melissa Poponne Skerrit (born 1981), Dominican politician.
- Roosevelt Skerrit (born 1972), Dominican politician.
- Crispin Sorhaindo (1931 - 2010), former president of Dominica.
- Osborne Symes (1937 -2013), Dominican civil servant and politician.
- Pershing Waldron (1945 - 2019), Dominican politician.
- Cassandra Williams, Dominican politician.

=== See also ===
- List of heads of government of Dominica
- List of presidents of Dominica
- List of colonial governors and administrators of Dominica
- List of members of the House of Assembly of Dominica
- List of ambassadors of Dominica to China
- List of ambassadors of Dominica to the United States

== Religious leadership ==
- Joseph Oliver Bowers (1910 - 2012), Catholic bishop born and raised on Dominica.
- Ogyen Trinley Dorje (born 1985), Karma Kagyu Buddhist leader with Dominican citizenship.
- Kelvin Felix (1933 -2024), Catholic cardinal born in Dominica.
- Philip Potter (1921 - 2015), Methodist Church leader born in Dominica.

== Scientists and physicians ==
- Chelsea Connor, herpetologist from Dominica.
- Jerelle Joseph, chemist from Dominica.
- Jasmine R. Marcelin, physician from Dominica.
- Harrison Prosper, particle physicist born in Dominica.

== Sports ==
Thea LaFond in 2019.

- Alick Athanaze (born 1998), cricketer born in Dominica.
- Joe Cooke (born 1955), footballer born in Dominica.
- Phillip DeFreitas (born 1966), cricketer born in Dominica.
- Billy Doctrove (born 1955), cricket umpire born in Dominica.
- Luan Gabriel (born 1996), Dominican sprinter.
- Kavem Hodge (born 1993), cricketer born in Dominica.
- Manjrekar James (born 1993), Canadian footballer born in Dominica.
- Tobi Jnohope (born 1997), American footballer who has represented Dominica in sports.
- Clem John (born 1941), cricketer and civil servant from Dominica.
- Garth Joseph (born 1973), basketballer born in Dominica.
- Thea Lafond (born 1994), Olympic gold athlete from Dominica.
- Kelleb Laurent (1941 - 2010), cricketer, educator and politician from Dominica.
- Jérôme Romain (born 1971), athlete representing Dominica.
- Adam Sanford (born 1975), cricketer from Dominica.
- Liam Sebastien (born 1984), cricketer from Dominica.
- Grayson Shillingford (1944 - 2009), cricketer born in Dominica.
- Irvine Shillingford, (1944 - 2023), cricketer born in Dominica.
- Shane Shillingford (born 1983), cricketer born in Dominica.

== See also ==
- List of Dominican Americans
- List of Eastern Caribbean people
