= Constituencies of Dominica =

Dominica has twenty-one, single member constituencies which elect representatives to the House of Assembly of Dominica. These elections occur using the simple-majority (or first-past-the-post) system and representatives typically serve for a term of five years. These constituencies are delineated by the Electoral Boundaries Commission under Chapter 3, Part V of the Constitution of Dominica, and must be reassessed every two to five years.

== Current constituencies ==
The following is the list of constituencies as at the last general election, 6 December 2019:

No.	Constituency	Number of Polling Divisions (2016)	Electorate (2016)
1	Castle Bruce	5	2850
2	Colihaut	3	1531
3	Cottage	3	2186
4	Grand Bay	3	3934
5	La Plaine	7	2562
6	Mahaut	7	7060
7	Marigot	3	2610
8	Morne Jaune/Riviere Cyrique	3	1726
9	Paix Bouche	4	2661
10	Petite Savanne	5	2665
11	Portsmouth	5	3272
12	Roseau Central	7	3822
13	Roseau North	7	7315
14	Roseau South	9	6874
15	Roseau Valley	5	2560
16	Salisbury	4	2631
17	Salybia	2	2531
18	St. Joseph	5	3867
19	Soufrière	4	3409
20	Vieille Case	6	2148
21	Wesley	3	3254
Total		100	71,468
