= Roseau North (Dominica constituency) =

Electoral district of Dominica

- Constituency for the House of Assembly of Dominica
- Electorate: 7,654 (2022)

Current constituency
- Party: Dominica Labour Party
- Representative: Miriam Blanchard

Roseau North is one of the 21 electoral districts of the House of Assembly of Dominica. It contains the areas of Goodwill, Fond Cole, Morne Daniel, and Pottersville. It is currently represented by Dominica Labour Party MP Miriam Blanchard.

== Electorate ==
The following is a list of the number of eligible voters in the Roseau North constituency at the time of each election provided by the Electoral Office of Dominica.

Year	Electorate	Notes
1980	4,770	
1985	5,842	
1990	4,790	
1995	5,497	
2000	5,885	
2005	6,450	
2014	7,382	
2019	7,650	
2022	7,654	

== List of representatives ==
Election	Years	Member	Party (Note: Indicates party the MP was running with during their election.)	Notes
1980	1980 – 1985	Henry G. Dyer	DFP	
1985	1985 – 1995	Allan A. Guye	DFP	
1995	1995 – 2009	Julius Timothy	UWP	
2009	2009 – 2014	Julius Timothy	DLP	
2014	2014 – 2022	Daniel Lugay	UWP	
2022	2022 –	Miriam Blanchard	DLP	

== Electoral history ==
The following is a list of election results from the Electoral Office of Dominica. The election results lack spoiled and rejected ballots.

2009 Roseau North general election
Candidate	Party	Votes	%
Julius Timothy	Dominica Labour Party	1,655	50.29
Daniel Lugay	United Workers' Party	1,538	46.73
Henry Babs Dyer	Dominica Freedom Party	95	2.89
Michael Wright	Dominica Progressive Party	3	0.09
Total		3,291	100.00
DLP hold			

2014 Roseau North general election
Candidate	Party	Votes	%
Daniel Lugay	United Workers' Party	2,266	58.25
Julius Timothy	Dominica Labour Party	1,624	41.75
Total		3,890	100.00
UWP gain from DLP			

2019 Roseau North general election
Candidate	Party	Votes	%
Daniel Lugay	United Workers' Party	2,134	56.57
Joseph Isaac	Dominica Labour Party	1,638	43.43
Total		3,772	100.00
UWP hold			

2022 Roseau North general election
Candidate	Party	Votes	%
Miriam Blanchard	Dominica Labour Party	1,483	87.70
Sherman H. Boston	Independent	116	6.86
Tyrone F. Nicholas	Independent	92	5.44
Total		1,691	100.00
DLP gain from UWP			
