= Wesley (Dominica constituency) =

Electoral district of Dominica

- Constituency for the House of Assembly of Dominica
- Electorate: 3,352 (2022)

Current constituency
- Party: Dominica Labour Party
- Representative: Fidel Grant

Wesley is one of the 21 electoral districts of the House of Assembly of Dominica. It contains the areas of Wesley and Woodford Hill. It is currently represented by Dominica Labour Party MP Fidel Grant.

== Electorate ==
The following is a list of the number of eligible voters in the Wesley constituency at the time of each election provided by the Electoral Office of Dominica.

Year	Electorate	Notes
1975	1,456	
1980	2,295	
1985	2,778	
1990	2,303	
1995	2,547	
2000	2,724	
2005	3,012	
2014	3,305	
2019	3,330	
2022	3,352	

== List of representatives ==
Election	Years	Member	Party (Note: Indicates party the MP was running with during their election.)	Notes
1975	1975 – 1980	Osbourne N. Theodore	DLP	
1980	1980 – 1985	Kenneth Williams	DFP	
1985	1985 – 1990	Robert Elford Henry	DLP	
1990	1990 – 1995	Edgar W. B. Jerome	UWP	
1995	1995 – 2009	Peter Carbon	UWP	
2009	2009 – 2014	Gloria Shillingford	DLP	
2014	2014 – 2019	Ezekiel Bazil	UWP	
2019	2019 –	Fidel Grant	DLP	

== Electoral history ==
The following is a list of election results from the Electoral Office of Dominica. The election results lack spoiled and rejected ballots.

2009 Wesley general election
Candidate	Party	Votes	%
Gloria Shillingford	Dominica Labour Party	809	52.43
Ezekiel Bazil	United Workers' Party	734	47.57
Total		1,543	100.00
DLP gain from UWP			

2014 Wesley general election
Candidate	Party	Votes	%
Ezekiel Bazil	United Workers' Party	940	53.87
Athenia Benjamin	Dominica Labour Party	805	46.13
Total		1,745	100.00
UWP gain from DLP			

2019 Wesley general election
Candidate	Party	Votes	%
Fidel Grant	Dominica Labour Party	859	53.09
Ezekiel Bazil	United Workers' Party	759	46.91
Total		1,618	100.00
DLP gain from UWP			

2022 Wesley general election
Candidate	Party	Votes	%
Fidel Grant	Dominica Labour Party	717	70.99
Clint Rolle	Independent	293	29.01
Total		1,010	100.00
DLP hold			
