= Roseau Central (Dominica constituency) =

Electoral district of Dominica

- Constituency for the House of Assembly of Dominica
- Electorate: 4,021 (2022)

Current constituency
- Party: Dominica Labour Party
- Representative: Melissa Poponne Skerrit

Roseau Central is one of the 21 electoral districts of the House of Assembly of Dominica. It contains the Roseau area. It is currently represented by Dominica Labour Party MP Melissa Poponne Skerrit.

== Electorate ==
The following is a list of the number of eligible voters in the Roseau Central constituency at the time of each election provided by the Electoral Office of Dominica.

Year	Electorate	Notes
1980	2,949	
1985	3,200	
1990	3,182	
1995	3,577	
2000	3,811	
2005	3,904	
2014	3,852	
2019	3,983	
2022	4,021	

== List of representatives ==
Election	Years	Member	Party (Note: Indicates party the MP was running with during their election.)	Notes
1980	1980 – 1995	Eugenia Charles	DFP	Served as prime minister in from 1980 to 1995.
1995	1995 – 2005	Charles Savarin	DFP	
2005	2005 – 2014	Norris Prevost	UWP	
2014	2014 – 2019	Joseph Isaac	UWP	Join the DLP in 2018.
2019	2019 –	Melissa Poponne Skerrit	DLP	

== Electoral history ==
The following is a list of election results from the Electoral Office of Dominica. The election results lack spoiled and rejected ballots.

2009 Roseau Central general election
Candidate	Party	Votes	%
Norris Prevost	United Workers' Party	839	46.98
Alvin "Aloe" Bernard	Dominica Labour Party	836	46.81
Judith Pestaina	Dominica Freedom Party	109	6.10
Leonard "Pappy" Baptiste	Dominica Progressive Party	2	0.11
Total		1,786	100.00
UWP hold			

2014 Roseau Central general election
Candidate	Party	Votes	%
Joseph Isaac	United Workers' Party	991	51.70
Alvin L. Bernard	Dominica Labour Party	926	48.30
Total		1,917	100.00
UWP hold			

2019 Roseau Central general election
Candidate	Party	Votes	%
Melissa Poponne Skerrit	Dominica Labour Party	1,063	54.99
Glenroy Cuffy	United Workers' Party	870	45.01
Total		1,933	100.00
DLP hold			

2022 Roseau Central general election
Candidate	Party	Votes	%
Melissa Poponne Skerrit	Dominica Labour Party	1,037	92.10
Karshma Richards	Independent	49	4.35
Jason Jno Baptiste	Team Unity Dominica	40	3.55
Total		1,126	100.00
DLP hold			
