= Vieille Case (Dominica constituency) =

Electoral district of Dominica

- Constituency for the House of Assembly of Dominica
- Electorate: 2,227 (2019)

Current constituency
- Party: Dominica Labour Party
- Representative: Roosevelt Skerrit

Vieille Case is one of the 21 electoral districts of the House of Assembly of Dominica. It contains the areas of Penville, Thibaud, and Vieille Case. It is currently represented by Dominica Labour Party MP Roosevelt Skerrit.

== Electorate ==
The following is a list of the number of eligible voters in the Vieille Case constituency at the time of each election provided by the Electoral Office of Dominica.

Year	Electorate	Notes
1975	1,113	
1980	1,414	
1985	1,594	
1990	1,777	
1995	1,939	
2000	2,026	
2005	2,113	
2014	2,185	
2019	2,227	

== List of representatives ==
Election	Years	Member	Party (Note: Indicates party the MP was running with during their election.)	Notes
1975	1975 – 1980	Eden Bowers	DLP	
1980	1980 – 1990	Alexis E. Williams	DFP	
1990	1990 – 1995	Maynard Joseph	DFP	
1995	1995 – 2000	Vernice Bellony	UWP	
2000	2000 –	Roosevelt Skerrit	DLP	Served as prime minister in 2004 to present.

== Electoral history ==
The following is a list of election results from the Electoral Office of Dominica. The election results lack spoiled and rejected ballots.

2009 Vieille Case general election
Candidate	Party	Votes	%
Roosevelt Skerrit	Dominica Labour Party	1,041	87.55
Maynard Joseph	United Workers' Party	148	12.45
Total		1,189	100.00
DLP hold			

2014 Vieille Case general election
Candidate	Party	Votes	%
Roosevelt Skerrit	Dominica Labour Party	1,098	85.45
Alexander Birmingham	United Workers' Party	187	14.55
Total		1,285	100.00
DLP hold			

2019 Vieille Case general election
Candidate	Party	Votes	%
Roosevelt Skerrit	Dominica Labour Party	1,095	82.70
Clement Marcellin	United Workers' Party	229	17.30
Total		1,324	100.00
DLP hold			

2022 Vieille Case general election (Note: Elected unopposed.)
Candidate	Party	Votes	%
Roosevelt Skerrit	Dominica Labour Party	0	–
Total		0	–
DLP hold			
