= Morne Jaune/Riviere Cyrique (Dominica constituency) =

Electoral district of Dominica

- Constituency for the House of Assembly of Dominica
- Electorate: 1,748 (2022)

Current constituency
- Party: Dominica Labour Party
- Representative: Gretta Roberts

Morne Jaune/Riviere Cyrique is one of the 21 electoral districts of the House of Assembly of Dominica. It contains the areas of Grand Fond, Morne Jaune, and Riviere Cyrique. It is currently represented by Dominica Labour Party MP Gretta Roberts.

== Electorate ==
The following is a list of the number of eligible voters in the Morne Jaune/Riviere Cyrique constituency at the time of each election provided by the Electoral Office of Dominica.

Year	Electorate	Notes
1975	639	
1980	815	
1985	1,024	
1990	1,230	
1995	1,386	
2000	1,401	
2005	1,583	
2014	1,740	
2019	1,773	
2022	1,748	

== List of representatives ==
Election	Years	Member	Party (Note: Indicates party the MP was running with during their election.)	Notes
1975	1975 – 1985	Conrad W. Cyrus	Independent	
1985	1985 – 1990	Conrad W. Cyrus	DFP	
1990	1990 – 2005	Gertrude Roberts	UWP	
2005	2005 – 2009	Abraham Browne	UWP	
2009	2009 – 2019	Ivor Stephenson	DLP	
2019	2019 –	Gretta Roberts	DLP	

== Electoral history ==
The following is a list of election results from the Electoral Office of Dominica. The election results lack spoiled and rejected ballots.

2009 Morne Jaune/Riviere Cyrique general election
Candidate	Party	Votes	%
Ivor Stephenson	Dominica Labour Party	528	49.30
Abraham Browne	United Workers' Party	523	48.83
Benjamin Pascal	Dominica Freedom Party	20	1.87
Total		1,071	100.00
DLP gain from UWP			

2014 Morne Jaune/Riviere Cyrique general election
Candidate	Party	Votes	%
Ivor Stephenson	Dominica Labour Party	622	50.32
Thomson Fontaine	United Workers' Party	614	49.68
Total		1,236	100.00
DLP hold			

2019 Morne Jaune/Riviere Cyrique general election
Candidate	Party	Votes	%
Gretta Roberts	Dominica Labour Party	601	52.63
Pharo Cuffy	United Workers' Party	541	47.37
Total		1,142	100.00
DLP hold			

2022 Morne Jaune/Riviere Cyrique general election
Candidate	Party	Votes	%
Gretta Roberts	Dominica Labour Party	571	76.64
Kertney Matthew	Independent	174	23.36
Total		745	100.00
DLP hold			
