= St. Joseph (Dominica constituency) =

Electoral district of Dominica

- Constituency for the House of Assembly of Dominica
- Electorate: 4,105 (2022)

Current constituency
- Party: Dominica Labour Party
- Representative: Darron T. Lloyd

St. Joseph is one of the 21 electoral districts of the House of Assembly of Dominica. It contains the areas of Layou, Mero, and Saint Joseph. It is currently represented by Dominica Labour Party MP Darron T. Lloyd.

== Electorate ==
The following is a list of the number of eligible voters in the St. Joseph constituency at the time of each election provided by the Electoral Office of Dominica.

Year	Electorate	Notes
1975	1,602	
1980	2,166	
1985	2,583	
1990	3,015	
1995	3,278	
2000	3,386	
2005	3,640	
2014	3,914	
2019	4,072	
2022	4,105	

== List of representatives ==
Election	Years	Member	Party (Note: Indicates party the MP was running with during their election.)	Notes
1975	1975 – 1980	I. A. Thomas	DLP	
1980	1980 – 1985	Kelleb Laurent	DFP	
1985	1985 – 1990	Patrick John	DLP	
1990	1990 – 2000	Doreen Paul	UWP	
2000	2000 – 2009	Vince Henderson	DLP	
2009	2009 – 2019	Kelver D. Darroux	DLP	
2019	2019 – 2022	Adis King	DLP	
2022	2022 –	Darron T. Lloyd	DLP	

== Electoral history ==
The following is a list of election results from the Electoral Office of Dominica. The election results lack spoiled and rejected ballots.

2009 St. Joseph general election
Candidate	Party	Votes	%
Kelver D. Darroux	Dominica Labour Party	1,138	58.78
Henry John Abraham	United Workers' Party	788	40.70
Marcella Boatswain	Dominica Progressive Party	5	0.26
Roland Mitchel	People's Democratic Movement	5	0.26
Total		1,936	100.00
DLP hold			

2014 St. Joseph general election
Candidate	Party	Votes	%
Kelver D. Darroux	Dominica Labour Party	1,198	56.01
Monell Williams	United Workers' Party	941	43.99
Total		2,139	100.00
DLP hold			

2019 St. Joseph general election
Candidate	Party	Votes	%
Adis King	Dominica Labour Party	1,324	60.15
Monell Williams	United Workers' Party	877	39.85
Total		2,201	100.00
DLP hold			

2022 St. Joseph general election
Candidate	Party	Votes	%
Darron T. Lloyd	Dominica Labour Party	1,014	90.13
Clivian I. Rolle	Team Unity Dominica	50	4.44
Ferdinand M. Germain	Independent	33	2.93
Tiyani I. Behanzin	Independent	28	2.49
Total		1,125	100.00
DLP hold			
