= Petite Savanne (Dominica constituency) =

Electoral district of Dominica

- Constituency for the House of Assembly of Dominica
- Electorate: 2,755 (2019)

Current constituency
- Party: Dominica Labour Party
- Representative: Jullan Defoe

Petite Savanne is one of the 21 electoral districts of the House of Assembly of Dominica. It contains the areas of Bagatelle, Bellevue Chopin, Fond St. Jean, and Petite Savanne. It is currently represented by Dominica Labour Party MP Jullan Defoe.

== Electorate ==
The following is a list of the number of eligible voters in the Petite Savanne constituency at the time of each election provided by the Electoral Office of Dominica.

Year	Electorate	Notes
1975	1,104	
1980	1,587	
1985	1,763	
1990	2,082	
1995	2,324	
2000	2,397	
2005	2,525	
2014	2,721	
2019	2,755	

== List of representatives ==
Election	Years	Member	Party (Note: Indicates party the MP was running with during their election.)	Notes
1975	1975 – 1980	Luke Taylor Corriette	DLP	
1980	1980 – 1990	Ralph Stanley Fadelle	DFP	
1990	1990 – 2009	Urban Baron	DLP	
2009	2009 – 2022	Kenneth Darroux	DLP	
2022	2022 –	Jullan Defoe	DLP	

== Electoral history ==
The following is a list of election results from the Electoral Office of Dominica. The election results lack spoiled and rejected ballots.

2009 Petite Savanne general election
Candidate	Party	Votes	%
Kenneth Darroux	Dominica Labour Party	1,243	82.26
Samuel Raphael	Independent	268	17.74
Total		1,511	100.00
DLP hold			

2014 Petite Savanne general election
Candidate	Party	Votes	%
Kenneth Darroux	Dominica Labour Party	1,183	69.88
Urban Baron	United Workers' Party	510	30.12
Total		1,693	100.00
DLP hold			

2019 Petite Savanne general election
Candidate	Party	Votes	%
Kenneth Darroux	Dominica Labour Party	1,192	70.41
Rosana Emmanuel	United Workers' Party	501	29.59
Total		1,693	100.00
DLP hold			

2022 Petite Savanne general election (Note: Elected unopposed.)
Candidate	Party	Votes	%
Jullan Defoe	Dominica Labour Party	0	–
Total		0	–
DLP hold			
