= Salybia (Dominica constituency) =

Electoral district of Dominica

- Constituency for the House of Assembly of Dominica
- Electorate: 2,660 (2022)

Current constituency
- Party: Dominica Labour Party
- Representative: Cozier Frederick

Salybia is one of the 21 electoral districts of the House of Assembly of Dominica. It contains the areas of Atkinson, Bataka, Crayfish River, Salybia, and Sineku. It is currently represented by Dominica Labour Party MP Cozier Frederick.

== Electorate ==
The following is a list of the number of eligible voters in the Salybia constituency at the time of each election provided by the Electoral Office of Dominica.

Year	Electorate	Notes
1975	738	
1980	1,138	
1985	1,315	
1990	1,490	
1993	1,699	
1995	1,841	
2000	1,982	
2005	2,277	
2014	2,577	
2019	2,664	
2022	2,660	

== List of representatives ==
Election	Years	Member	Party (Note: Indicates party the MP was running with during their election.)	Notes
1975	1975 – 1980	Lawrence Darroux	DLP	
1980	1980 – 1985	Matthew Joseph	DDLP	
1985	1985 – 1990	Ann Timothy	DFP	
1990	1990 – 1993	Worrel Sanford	DLP	Resigned.
1993 (Note: By-election)	1993 – 2000	Francois Barrie	UWP	
2000	2000 – 2009	Kelly Graneau	DLP	
2009	2009 – 2014	Ashton Graneau	DLP	
2014	2014 – 2019	Casius Darroux	DLP	
2019	2019 –	Cozier Frederick	DLP	

== Electoral history ==
The following is a list of election results from the Electoral Office of Dominica. The election results lack spoiled and rejected ballots.

2009 Salybia general election
Candidate	Party	Votes	%
Ashton Graneau	Dominica Labour Party	1,013	59.55
Claudius Sanford	United Workers' Party	684	40.21
Christabelle Auguiste	Independent	4	0.24
Total		1,701	100.00
DLP hold			

2014 Salybia general election
Candidate	Party	Votes	%
Casius Darroux	Dominica Labour Party	1,152	61.11
Claudius Sanford	United Workers' Party	733	38.89
Total		1,885	100.00
DLP hold			

2019 Salybia general election
Candidate	Party	Votes	%
Cozier Frederick	Dominica Labour Party	1,081	56.98
Anette Sanford	United Workers' Party	816	43.02
Total		1,897	100.00
DLP hold			

2022 Salybia general election
Candidate	Party	Votes	%
Cozier Frederick	Dominica Labour Party	1,020	72.19
Muta J. Laville-Matthew	Independent	393	27.81
Total		1,413	100.00
DLP hold			
