= Roseau Valley (Dominica constituency) =

Electoral district of Dominica

- Constituency for the House of Assembly of Dominica
- Electorate: 2,935 (2019)

Current constituency
- Party: Dominica Labour Party
- Representative: Irving McIntyre

Roseau Valley is one of the 21 electoral districts of the House of Assembly of Dominica. It contains the areas of Cockrane, Laudat, Morne Prosper, Trafalgar, and Wotten Waven. It is currently represented by Dominica Labour Party MP Irving McIntyre.

== Electorate ==
The following is a list of the number of eligible voters in the Roseau Valley constituency at the time of each election provided by the Electoral Office of Dominica.

Year	Electorate	Notes
1980	972	
1985	1,127	
1990	1,312	
1995	1,536	
2000	1,659	
2005	2,009	
2014	2,579	
2019	2,935	

== List of representatives ==
Election	Years	Member	Party (Note: Indicates party the MP was running with during their election.)	Notes
1980	1980 – 1995	Henry George	DFP	
1995	1995 – 2009	Norris M. Charles	UWP	
2009	2009 – 2019	John C. Mc Intyre	DLP	
2019	2019 –	Irving McIntyre	DLP	

== Electoral history ==
The following is a list of election results from the Electoral Office of Dominica. The election results lack spoiled and rejected ballots.

2009 Roseau Valley general election
Candidate	Party	Votes	%
John C. McIntyre	Dominica Labour Party	936	57.99
Norris W. Charles	United Workers' Party	658	40.77
Michael Anthony Astaphan	Dominica Freedom Party	20	1.24
Total		1,614	100.00
DLP gain from UWP			

2014 Roseau Valley general election
Candidate	Party	Votes	%
John C. McIntyre	Dominica Labour Party	944	52.86
Ronald Charles	United Workers' Party	842	47.14
Total		1,786	100.00
DLP hold			

2019 Roseau Valley general election
Candidate	Party	Votes	%
Irving McIntyre	Dominica Labour Party	1,118	59.28
Ronald Charles	United Workers' Party	768	40.72
Total		1,886	100.00
DLP hold			

2022 Roseau Valley general election (Note: Elected unopposed.)
Candidate	Party	Votes	%
Irving McIntyre	Dominica Labour Party	0	–
Total		0	–
DLP hold			
