= Portsmouth (Dominica constituency) =

Electoral district of Dominica

- Constituency for the House of Assembly of Dominica
- Electorate: 3,379 (2022)

Current constituency
- Party: Dominica Labour Party
- Representative: Fenella Wenham

Portsmouth is one of the 21 electoral districts of the House of Assembly of Dominica. It contains the areas of Dos D'Ane, Bornes, Glanvillia, and Portsmouth. It is currently represented by Dominica Labour Party MP Fenella Wenham.

== Electorate ==
The following is a list of the number of eligible voters in the Portsmouth constituency at the time of each election provided by the Electoral Office of Dominica.

Year	Electorate	Notes
1975	1,337	
1980	1,649	
1985	2,000	
1990	2,421	
1992	2,528	
1995	2,739	
2000	2,766	
2005	2,965	
2014	3,348	
2019	3,384	
2022	3,379	

== List of representatives ==
Election	Years	Member	Party (Note: Indicates party the MP was running with during their election.)	Notes
1975	1975 – 1980	Michael Douglas	DLP	
1980	1980 – 1985	Michael Douglas	DDLP	
1985	1985 – 1992	Michael Douglas	DLP	Died in office.
1992 (Note: By-election)	1992 – 2000	Rosie Douglas	DLP	Served as prime minister in 2000. Died in office.
2000	2000 – 2022	Ian Douglas	DLP	
2022	2022 –	Fenella Wenham	DLP	

== Electoral history ==
The following is a list of election results from the Electoral Office of Dominica. The election results lack spoiled and rejected ballots.

2009 Portsmouth general election
Candidate	Party	Votes	%
Ian Douglas	Dominica Labour Party	1,251	87.24
Murphy Wallace	Dominica Freedom Party	91	6.35
Errol Moir Hill	Independent	61	4.25
Albert Cecil Severin	Independent	18	1.26
Julian Stephen Brewster	People's Democratic Movement	13	0.91
Total		1,434	100.00
DLP hold			

2014 Portsmouth general election
Candidate	Party	Votes	%
Ian Douglas	Dominica Labour Party	1,351	80.04
Jefferson F. James	United Workers' Party	318	18.84
Cabral Douglas	Independent	19	1.13
Total		1,688	100.00
DLP hold			

2019 Portsmouth general election
Candidate	Party	Votes	%
Ian Douglas	Dominica Labour Party	1,253	77.25
Jefferson F. James	United Workers' Party	369	22.75
Total		1,622	100.00
DLP hold			

2022 Portsmouth general election
Candidate	Party	Votes	%
Fenella Wenham	Dominica Labour Party	916	88.85
Magdalene H. Vidal	Independent	115	11.15
Total		1,031	100.00
DLP hold			
