= Alvin Bernard =

Dominican politician

Senator in the House of Assembly
- Incumbent
- Assumed office 4 January 2010

Personal details
- Born: 1955 (age 70–71)
- Party: Dominica Labour Party
- Education: University of Wales; University of East Anglia

Alvin Bernard (born October 1955) is a Dominican economist and politician in the Dominica Labour Party. He has served in the House of Assembly since 2010.

Bernard was born in Roseau, Dominica's capital, in October 1955. He graduated from the University of Wales and the University of East Anglia. He worked as an economist in the Dominican Ministry of Finance for 23 years, in the positions of Project Analyst, Economist, and Social Development Planner. He contested the Roseau Central constituency on the Labour Party ticket in the 2009 general election. He lost to the incumbent, Norris Prevost of the opposition United Workers Party, on 18 December 2009, by the narrow margin of 836 votes to Prevost's 839 votes. He was then appointed by Prime Minister Roosevelt Skerrit to serve as a senator in the House of Assembly, and was sworn in on 4 January 2010. He also serves as the Minister of State in the Ministry of Foreign Affairs.
