= Delbert Paris =

Dominican politician

Delbert Paris is a Dominican politician.

== Biography ==
Delbert Paris is a civil engineer. He joined the Rotary Club of Dominica in 2014. He was elected president of the Rotary Club in 2019. He served as president until 2021.

In December 2022, following that year's general election, Paris was selected as an opposition senator of the House of Assembly by independent MP Anthony Charles. By late November 2024, Paris announced his candidacy for political leader of the opposition United Workers' Party (UWP). At the Delegates Conference of the UWP on 15 December, Paris was defeated by incumbent political leader Thomson Fontaine. He was elected deputy political leader. In April 2025, he resigned as deputy political leader effective 28 April 2025. According to Dominica News Online, Paris cited "public criticism and internal party tensions" following his affirmative vote on electoral reform legislation.
