= Ronnie Isidore =

Dominican politician

Ronald Isidore is a Dominican politician in the United Workers' Party. He has served in the House of Assembly of Dominica since 2010.

Isidore contested the Mahaut constituency on the UWP ticket in the 2009 general election. He lost on 18 December 2009 to the incumbent, Rayburn John Blackmoore of the Labour Party, with 1,457 votes to Blackmoore's 2,136 (58.5% to 39.9%). He was subsequently appointed to serve as a Senator by the Opposition Leader Hector John on 5 August 2010.

Isidore is a graduate of Iona College in New York.
