= Cassanni Laville =

Dominican politician

Cassanni Laville is a Dominican politician.

== Biography ==
Cassanni Laville earned an associate degree in civil engineering from Dominica State College. He then earned a Master of Science degree in civil engineering from the University of North Carolina at Charlotte. He started a PhD program at that university, but did not finish it. In 2015, Laville was elected as vice president of the Dominica Association of Professional Engineers.

Following the 2019 general election, Laville was appointed by the president, based on advise from Prime Minister Roosevelt Skerrit, to serve as a senator for the Dominica Labour Party (DLP) in the House of Assembly. On 17 December 2019, Laville was appointed as minister for public works and the digital economy. After the death of Edward Registe in September 2021, Laville was elected general secretary of the DLP on 17 March 2022.

Laville was elected to the House of Assembly in the Mahaut constituency on the DLP ticket in the 2022 general election. On 13 December 2022, Laville was sworn in as minister for health, wellness, and social services.
