= Tammy Jean-Jacques =

Dominican politician

Tammy Jean-Jacques is a Dominican politician in the Labour Party. She served in the House of Assembly from 2010 to 2014.

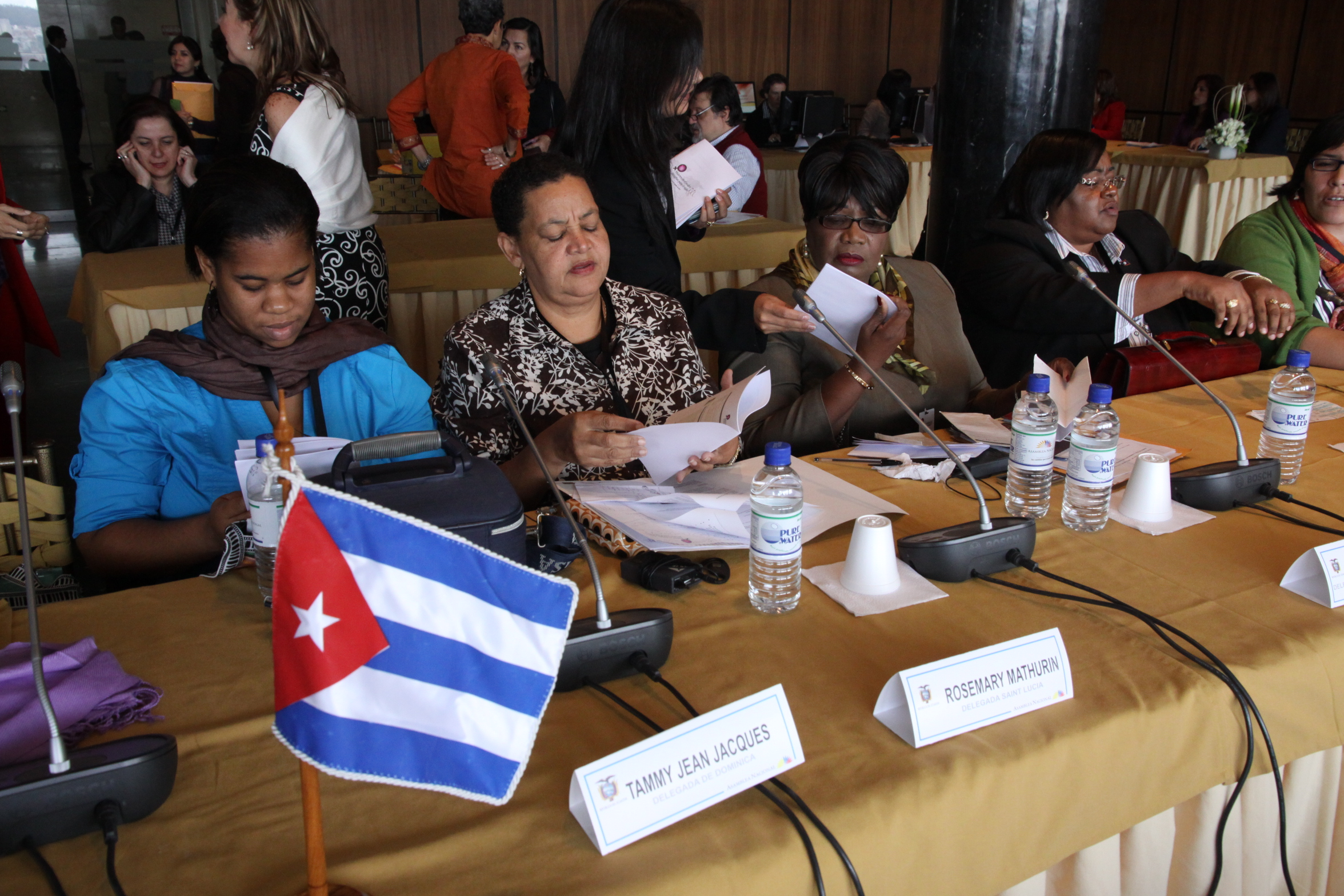
Jean-Jacques (left) in 2010

Following the Labour Party's victory in the 2009 general election, Jean-Jacques was appointed a Senator by Prime Minister Roosevelt Skerrit and sworn in on 3 February 2010. She was only 25 at the time of her appointment. She subsequently became Treasurer of the Labour Party.
