= Alastair Forbes =

Sir Alastair Granville Forbes
- Born: 3 January 1908; Saint Kitts
- Died: August 2001 (aged 93)
- Education: Clare College, Cambridge
- Occupation: Colonial judge
- Known for: President of the Courts of Appeal for St Helena, Falkland Islands & British Antarctic Territories (1965–1988)
- Spouse: Constance Irene Mary Hughes‑White (m. 1936)
- Children: 2
- Awards: Knighthood (1960)

Sir Alastair Granville Forbes (3 January 1908 – August 2001) was a Caribbean-born British colonial civil servant who served with the Colonial Legal Service and ended his career as President of the Courts of Appeal for St Helena, the Falkland Islands and British Antarctic Territories from 1965 until 1988.

== Early life ==
Forbes was born in Saint Kitts, where his father, Granville Forbes, farmed and was educated at Blundell's School in Tiverton and read law at Clare College, Cambridge. After being called to the bar by Gray's Inn, he joined the Colonial Legal Service in 1932.

== Career ==
Forbes' first overseas posting was to Dominica in the British West Indies in 1936 as a magistrate and government officer, where much of his time was spent compiling an index of the island's laws (his assistant for many years was the barrister (later Dame) Eugenia Charles, who subsequently co-founded the Dominica Freedom Party and in 1980 became the Caribbean's first female prime minister).

After a period as a Crown attorney in the Leeward Islands in 1939, Forbes moved in 1940 to Fiji, where he served progressively as resident magistrate, crown counsel, solicitor general and assistant legal adviser to the Western Pacific High Commission. In the latter capacity he revised and redrafted all the laws of Fiji, for which he was offered (and turned down) a knighthood.

His next tour, beginning in 1947, was to Malaya as a legal draftsman, and in 1950 he was appointed Solicitor General of Northern Rhodesia. The following year he became Permanent Secretary of the Ministry of Justice and Solicitor General in Gold Coast (later to become Ghana).

In 1956, he was appointed a puisne judge in Kenya, and the next year he was promoted a Justice of Appeal at the Court of Appeal for Eastern Africa. He became Vice President of the same court in 1958, and, from 1963 until 1964, he served as Federal Justice of the Federal Supreme Court of Rhodesia and Nyasaland.

He was President of the Court of Appeal for the Seychelles from 1965 until 1976, and for Gibraltar from 1970 until 1983. He served as a member of the panel of chairmen of industrial tribunals from 1965 until 1973, and was President of the Pensions Appeals Tribunals for England and Wales from 1973 until 1980.

== Marriage ==
He married Constance Irene Mary Hughes-White in 1936 and was knighted in 1960. The couple had two children: Anne Margaret Banting (née Forbes; b. 1936) and Elizabeth Farrant (née Forbes; 1938 - 2015).

== Sources ==
- Extracted from the obituary of Sir Alastair Forbes, The Daily Telegraph, 11 August 2001
