= Norris Prevost =

Dominican politician

Norris Prevost is a Dominican politician in the United Workers' Party. He has served in the House of Assembly of Dominica since 1990.

Prevost graduated from the University of the West Indies, with a Bachelor of Science degree in agricultural economics, and a Master of Business Administration. He also earned a Master in Public Administration from the John F. Kennedy School of Government at Harvard University.

Prevost was appointed as a senator to the House of Assembly from 1990 to 2005. From 1995 to 2000, he served as the Minister of Tourism. He was elected as a representative to the House of Assembly in the 2005 general election, from the Roseau Central constituency. Prevost was reelected in the 2009 general election, by the narrow margin of 839 votes to 836 for his Labour Party opponent, Alvin Bernard.

The 2009 election overall was a loss for the UWP, which lost four seats to retain only three. Prevost subsequently joined the UWP boycott of the House of Assembly, in protest against alleged election irregularities. Prevost became the only UWP member to break the boycott, taking his seat on 29 April 2010 in what he stated was a strategic move on behalf of the UWP. The other two UWP seats were declared vacant and a by-election held, though both UWP members won to retain their seats.
