= Gloria Shillingford =

Dominican politician

Gloria Marilyn Shillingford, SAH (née Dodds), is a Dominican educator and a politician in the Labour Party. She served in the House of Assembly of Dominica from 2005 to 2014.

Shillingford graduated from Westmar University with a Bachelor of Arts. She began working as a teacher in 1979, and eventually became principal of St. Andrews High School. She remained in education until she entered electoral politics.

She ran unsuccessfully for the Wesley seat in the House of Assembly in the 2005 general election. She was subsequently appointed as a Senator that year. Shillingford again contested the Wesley constituency in the 2009 general election. She won the seat on 18 December 2009, with 809 votes against 734 received by Ezekiel Bazil of the UWP (52.4% to 47.6%). Shillingford did not run for re-election in 2014.

Shillingford has also served as the Minister for Social Services, Community Development and Gender Affairs, and as Secretary General of the UNESCO Dominica Commission.
