= Daniel Lugay =

Dominican politician and footballer

Daniel Lugay is a Dominican politician in the United Workers' Party. He currently serves in the House of Assembly of Dominica as an Opposition Senator.

Lugay played on the Dominica national football team in 1978 and 1985. He has been active in promoting community sports and in helping to develop sports infrastructure in Dominica. Lugay was trained as a rural communications specialist, and worked as the communications manager of Dominica Banana Produces Ltd. and as a video and radio producer.

Lugay served on the Roseau City Council beginning in 1996. In the 2009 general election, he contested the North Roseau constituency in the House of Assembly on the UWP ticket. He lost to the incumbent, Julius Timothy, of the Labour Party on 18 December 2009, with 1538 votes to Timothy's 1655 (45.6% to 49.1%).

Lugay was sworn in as an Opposition Senator on October 25, 2011, to replace Claudius Sanford who had resigned to continue his education abroad. Lugay and the other UWP members of the House of Assembly then walked out of the session to resume the Opposition's boycott.

Lugay is married and has two children.
