= 2005 Dominican general election =

- 5 May 2005

21 of the 30 seats in the House of Assembly 11 seats needed for a majority
- Registered: 65,889
- Turnout: 59.09% (▼1.08pp)
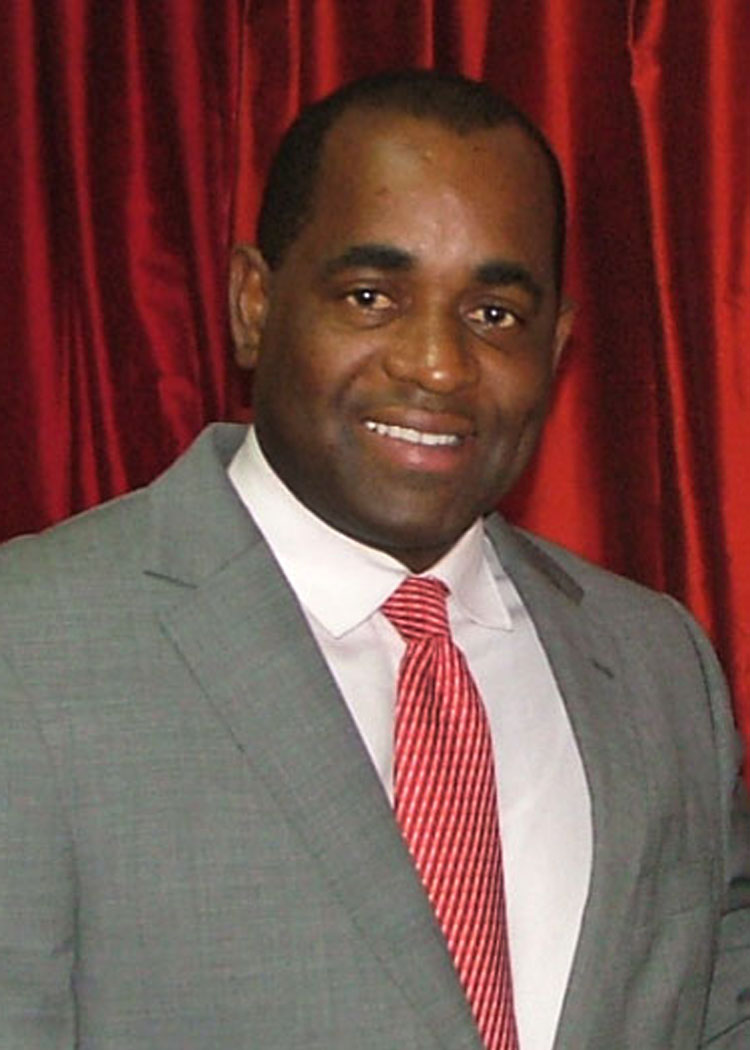

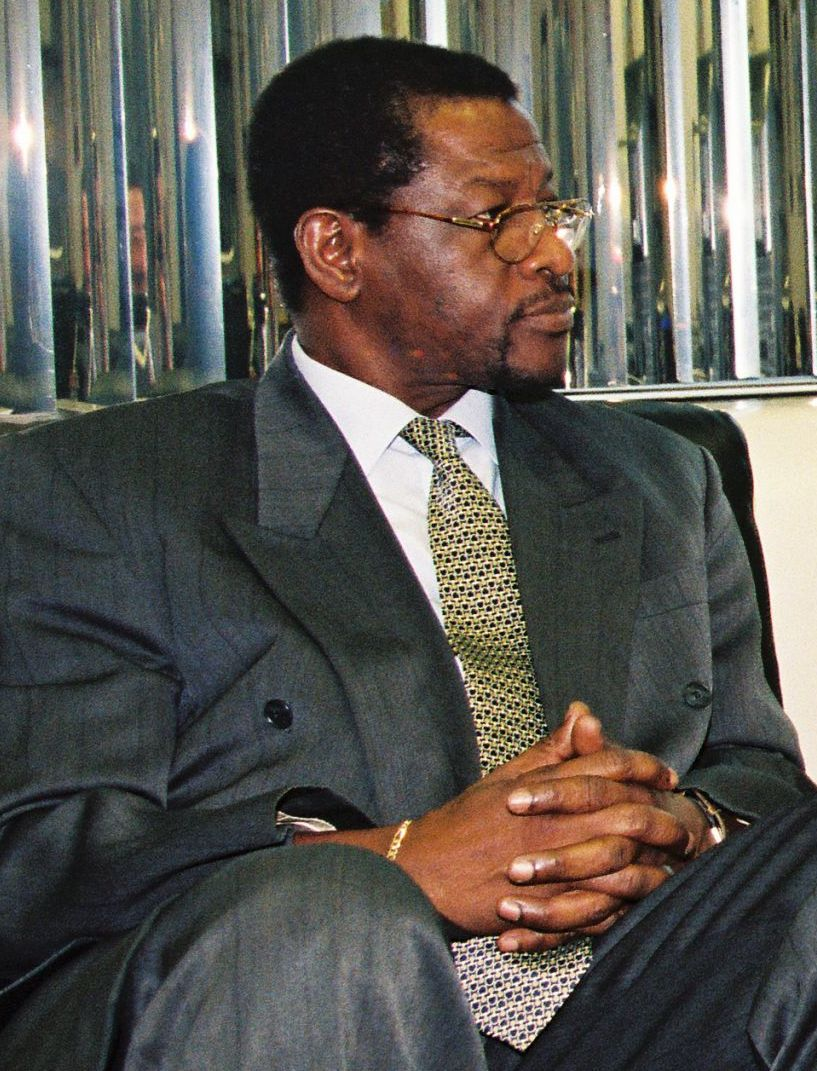
	First party	Second party
Leader	Roosevelt Skerrit	Edison James
Party	DLP	UWP
Leader's seat	Vieille Case	Marigot
Last election	42.91%, 10 seats	43.44%, 9 seats
Seats won	12	8
Seat change	▲2	▼1
Popular vote	19,741	16,529
Percentage	52.07%	43.60%
Swing	▲9.16pp	▲0.16pp
- Results by constituency
Prime Minister before election
Roosevelt Skerrit
DLP
Elected Prime Minister
Roosevelt Skerrit
DLP

General elections were held in Dominica on 5 May 2005. The result was a victory for the ruling Dominica Labour Party, which won 12 of the 21 seats in the House of Assembly. The opposition United Workers' Party unsuccessfully made legal challenges to several of the constituency results.

== Background ==
In the previous 2000 elections the ruling United Workers' Party won one fewer seats than the Dominica Labour Party, despite receiving more votes. As a result, the Dominica Labour Party with 10 seats was able to form a coalition government with the Dominica Freedom Party, which had won two seats. In 2004, Prime Minister Pierre Charles died and was succeeded by Minister of Education Roosevelt Skerrit.

== Campaign ==
On 7 April Skerrit announced that the elections would take place on 5 May. Altogether 47 candidates stood in the elections; 21 candidates from the United Workers' Party, 19 from the Dominica Labour Party, 3 from the Dominica Progressive Party, 2 from the Dominica Freedom Party and 2 independents. Just under 66,000 voters were registered to vote in the election at 249 polling stations spread over the 21 constituencies.

Major elections issues included an International Monetary Fund austerity economic plan for Dominica and the Dominica Labour Party government's decision to switch recognition from the Republic of China (Taiwan) to the People's Republic of China.

On the Monday before the election, there was an incident when motorcades for the two main parties collided with each other. No major injuries resulted and rallies for each party were held afterwards. The police then refused either party permission to hold motorcades on the day before the election.

The campaign was judged as being particularly long and divisive, with the election seen as very close and likely to come down to voter turnout.

== Opinion polls ==
A poll in February predicted that the United Workers' Party would win 12 seats, compared to 7 for the Dominica Labour Party and 2 for the Dominica Freedom Party. However another poll in March had the Dominica Labour Party winning 12 seats, the United Workers' Party 7 seats and the Dominica Freedom Party 2 seats.

== Results ==
The Dominica Labour Party increased their number of seats from 10 to 12, obtaining a majority. The United Workers' Party lost one seat, one independent candidate was elected, whilst the Dominica Freedom Party lost both its seats. It was the first election in 35 years where the Dominica Freedom Party—the governing party of Eugenia Charles from 1980 to 1995—did not win any seats. Prime Minister Skerrit announced that the day after the election would be a national holiday and called for Dominica to unite behind the government after the elections.

Party	Votes	%	Seats	+/–
Dominica Labour Party	19,741	52.07	12	+2
United Workers' Party	16,529	43.60	8	–1
Dominica Freedom Party	1,194	3.15	0	–2
Dominica Progressive Party	23	0.06	0	New
Independents	426	1.12	1	+1
Total	37,913	100.00	21	0
Valid votes	37,913	97.38		
Invalid/blank votes	1,022	2.62		
Total votes	38,935	100.00		
Registered voters/turnout	65,889	59.09		
Source: IPU

=== List of elected members ===
Constituency	Party	Elected member
Castle Bruce	UWP	Loreen Bannis-Roberts
Colihaut	IND	Ronald Toulon
Cottage	DLP	Reginald Austrie
Grand Bay	DLP	John Fabien
La Plaine	UWP	Ronald M. Green
Mahaut	DLP	Rayburn Blackmore
Marigot	UWP	Edison James
Morne Jaune/Riviere Cyrique	UWP	Abraham Browne
Paix Bouche	DLP	Matthew J. Walter
Petite Savanne	DLP	Urban Baron
Portsmouth	DLP	Ian Douglas
Roseau-Central	UWP	Norris Prevost
Roseau-North	UWP	Julius Timothy
Roseau-South	DLP	Ambrose George
Roseau-Valley	UWP	Norris M. Charles
Salisbury	UWP	Earl Williams
Salybia	DLP	Kelly Graneau
St. Joseph	DLP	Vince Henderson
Soufrière	DLP	Ian Pinard
Vieille Case	DLP	Roosevelt Skerrit
Wesley	UWP	Peter Carbon
Source: Electoral Office

== Aftermath ==
Following the elections, the United Workers' Party made legal challenges to the results of five constituencies, Castle Bruce, Soufriere, Mahaut, St Joseph and Carib Territory alleging that there were problems with the counts and that the results were rigged by the government. Initial counts in the Castle Bruce constituency had the United Workers' Party candidate ahead but the final result saw the Dominica Labour Party win by one vote. Opposition supporters protested the results outside of the government headquarters in Roseau. On the 28 October 2005 the legal challenges were dismissed by a High Court Justice, Hugh Rawlins. The appeals court also rejected the lawsuit in April 2006 and the United Workers' Party then dropped the challenges.
