= Michael Astaphan =

Dominican politician

Michael Anthony Astaphan is a politician from Dominica Freedom Party. He was the political leader of the party from 5 August 2007 to 2008, and again from 2012 to 2017.

Astaphan was born in Dominica. He holds an undergraduate degree in chemical engineering from the University of New Brunswick, a master's degree in Management Engineering from the University of Connecticut in Bridgeport and a certificate in Planning, Public Administration and Project Management from the Hartford Institute of Public Administration. He led the Dominica Association of Industry and Commerce for a number of years.
