= 2000 Dominican general election =

- 31 January 2000

21 of the 30 seats in the House of Assembly 11 seats needed for a majority
- Registered: 60,266
- Turnout: 60.17% (▼5.01pp)
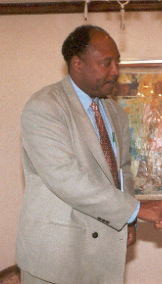

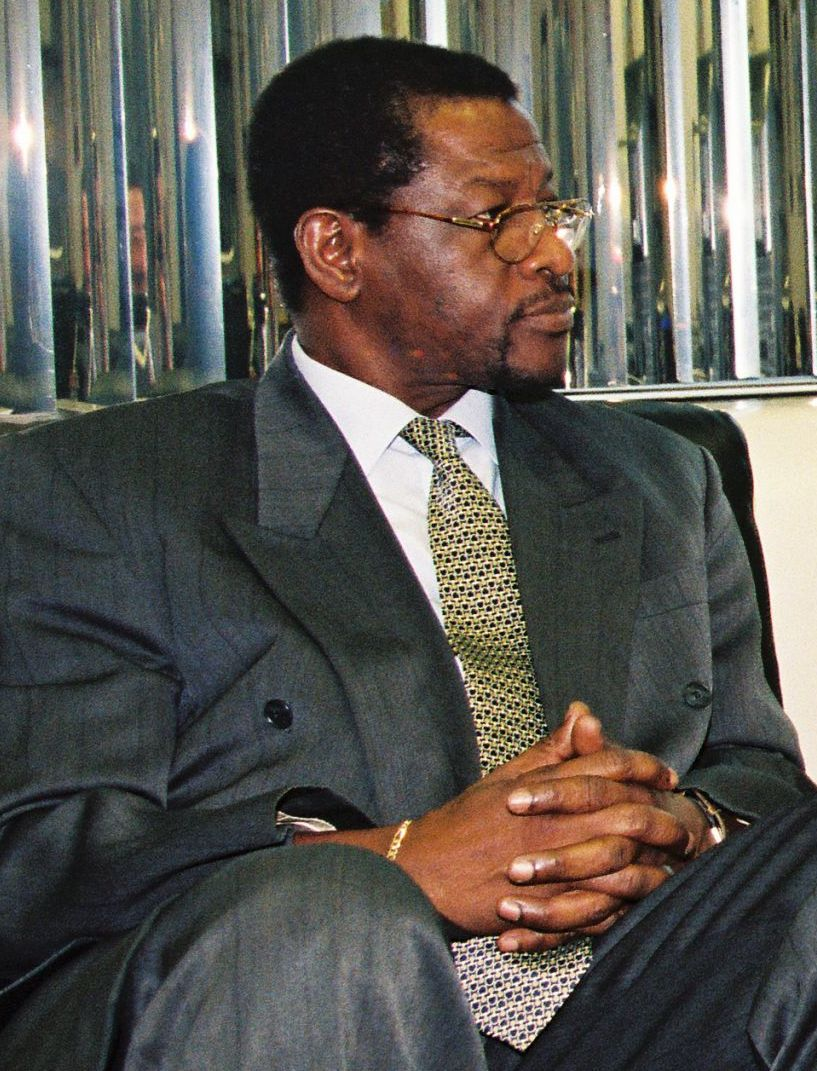

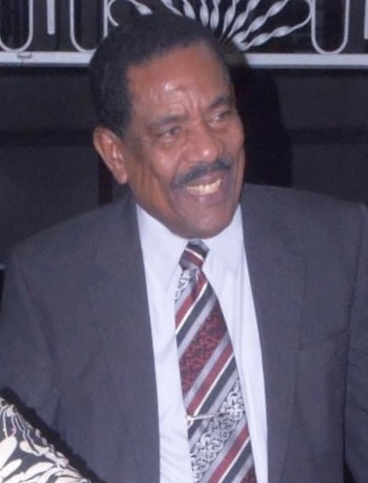
	First party	Second party	Third party
Leader	Rosie Douglas	Edison James	Charles Savarin
Party	DLP	UWP	DFP
Leader's seat	Portsmouth	Marigot	Roseau Central
Last election	29.75%, 5 seats	34.36%, 11 seats	35.81%, 5 seats
Seats won	10	9	2
Seat change	▲5	▼2	▼3
Popular vote	15,362	15,555	4,858
Percentage	42.91%	43.44%	13.57%
Swing	▲13.16pp	▲9.08pp	▼22.24pp
- Results by constituency
Prime Minister before election
Edison James
UWP
Elected Prime Minister
Rosie Douglas
DLP

General elections were held in Dominica on 31 January 2000 and saw the Dominica Labour Party led by Rosie Douglas take power defeating the previous government of the United Workers' Party led by Edison James, despite the UWP receiving more votes. The DLP won 10 seats, the UWP 9 seats and the Dominica Freedom Party took 2 seats. Voter turnout was 59.25%. The Dominica Labour Party formed a government in coalition with the Dominica Freedom Party. Voter turnout was 60.2%, the lowest since the introduction of universal suffrage in 1951.

== Campaign ==
The ruling United Workers' Party campaigned on their economic record while the Dominica Labour Party focused on charges of corruption against the government.

== Results ==
Party	Votes	%	Seats	+/–
United Workers' Party	15,555	43.44	9	–2
Dominica Labour Party	15,362	42.91	10	+5
Dominica Freedom Party	4,858	13.57	2	–3
Independents	29	0.08	0	New
Total	35,804	100.00	21	0
Valid votes	35,804	98.73		
Invalid/blank votes	460	1.27		
Total votes	36,264	100.00		
Registered voters/turnout	60,266	60.17		
Source: Nohlen

=== List of elected members ===
Constituency	Party	Elected member
Castle Bruce	UWP	Loreen Bannis-Roberts
Colihaut	DLP	Osborne Riviere
Cottage	DLP	Reginald Austrie
Grand Bay	DLP	Pierre Charles
La Plaine	UWP	Ronald M. Green
Mahaut	UWP	Julien Prevost
Marigot	UWP	Edison James
Morne Jaune/Riviere Cyrique	UWP	Gertrude Roberts
Paix Bouche	DLP	Matthew J. Walter
Petite Savanne	DLP	Urban Baron
Portsmouth	DLP	Rosie Douglas
Roseau-Central	DFP	Charles Savarin
Roseau-North	UWP	Julius Timothy
Roseau-South	DLP	Ambrose George
Roseau-Valley	UWP	Norris Charles
Salisbury	UWP	Earl Williams
Salybia	DLP	Kelly Graneau
St. Joseph	DLP	Vince Henderson
Soufrière	DFP	Frederick Baron
Vieille Case	DLP	Roosevelt Skerrit
Wesley	UWP	Peter Carbon
Source: Electoral Office
