= Colihaut (Dominica constituency) =

Electoral district in Dominica

- Constituency for the House of Assembly of Dominica
- Electorate: 1,531 (2016)

Current constituency
- Created: 1975
- Number of members: 1
- Representative: Catherine Daniel (DLP)

Colihaut is a parliamentary electoral district in Dominica. It includes the areas of Bioche, Colihaut, and Dublanc in Saint Peter Parish. It came into effect in time for the 1975 Dominican general election. It has been represented by Catherine Daniel of the Dominica Labour Party since the 2014 general election.

== Constituency profile ==
The constituency was created for the 1975 Dominican general election. It had an electorate of 1,531 as of November 2016. It extends from the sea along the border between Saint Joseph Parish and Saint Peter Parish to Morne Diablotins and then back along the boundary between the parishes to the sea.

== Representatives ==
This constituency has elected the following members of the House of Assembly of Dominica:

Election	Years	Member	Party	Notes
1975	24 March 1975 – 21 July 1980	F.F. Parillon	DLP	
1980	21 July 1980 – 1 July 1985	Alvin Armatrading	DFP	
1985	1 July 1985 – 12 June 1995	Clem A. Shillingford	DFP	
1995	12 June 1995 – 31 January 2000	Herbert Sabaroche	DFP	
2000	31 January 2000 – 5 May 2005	Branker F. John	DLP	
2005	5 May 2005 – 18 December 2009	Gerard Philogene	Independent	
2009	18 December 2009 – 8 December 2014	Ronald Toulon	DLP	
2014	8 December 2014 – Present	Catherine Daniel	DLP	

== Election results ==
=== Elections in the 2010s ===
2019 general election: Colihaut
Party	Candidate	Votes	%	±%
DLP	Catherine Daniel	677	79.09	
UWP	Nicholas George	185	21.61	
Majority		492	57.48	
Turnout		856		
DLP hold		Swing		

2014 general election: Colihaut
Party	Candidate	Votes	%	±%
DLP	Catherine Daniel	706	76.08	
UWP	Nicholas George	222	23.92	
Majority		484	52.16	
Turnout		928	59.35	
DLP hold		Swing		
