= Vernice Bellony =

Dominican politician and teacher

Vernice Idda Bellony is a Dominican politician. She formerly worked as a teacher and was a founding member of the United Workers' Party.

She was a Senator from 1990 to 1995 and Member of Parliament for Vieille Case from 1995 until 2000. She was succeeded as MP by future Prime Minister of Dominica Roosevelt Skerrit.

In 2013, the National Corporative Credit Union started a scholarship in her name.
