= Miriam Blanchard =

Dominican Labour Party politician

Minister for Labour, Public Service Reform, Social Partnership, Entrepreneurship and Small Business Development
- Incumbent
- Assumed office 13 November 2022
- Prime Minister: Roosevelt Skerrit

Minister for Planning and Economic Development
- In office 10 April 2018 – 16 December 2019
- Prime Minister: Roosevelt Skerrit
- Preceded by: John Collin McIntyre

Minister for Public Works and Ports
- In office 7 March 2016 – 10 April 2018
- Prime Minister: Roosevelt Skerrit
- Preceded by: Ian Pinard
- Succeeded by: John Colin McIntyre

Personal details
- Party: Dominica Labour Party

Miriam Blanchard is a Dominican Labour Party politician who is Parliamentary representative for the Roseau North constituency and is a Minister in the Cabinet of Dominica since 2016.

== Biography ==
From 8 March 2016, Blanchard was appointed as Minister for Public Works and Ports. In post, she approved over 500 Dominican infrastructure projects to rebuild following the impact of Tropical Storm Erika.

In 2018, Blanchard was "caretaker" of the Roseau North Constituency and served as Minister for Planning and Economic Development.

On 23 November 2022, Blanchard was launched by Roosevelt Skerrit as Dominica Labour Party Parliamentary candidate for the Roseau North Constituency in the 2022 Dominican general election. She won the seat, has worked on job creation, and has secured funding from the Kingdom of Saudi Arabia to fund the Roseau Enhancement Project, which includes the Goodwill Secondary School (GSS) and five primary schools.

Blanchard was appointed as Minister for Labour, Public Service Reform, Social Partnership, Entrepreneurship and Small Business Development on 13 November 2022. She attended the Annual General Meeting of the Dominica Council on Aging (DCOA) in 2023 and the 40th Annual General Meeting of the Dominica Association of Persons with Disabilities (DAPD) in 2024.

In June 2024, Blanchard signed a Citizenship Deprivation Order, revoking the Dominican citizenship of 68 people who had gained their citizenship through "fraud."

In August 2025, Blanchard sought medical treatment outside of Dominica.
