= Austelle Lockhart =

Dominica politician

Senator
- Incumbent
- Assumed office 12 December 2022

Personal details
- Party: Dominica Labour Party

Austelle Lockhart is a Dominica politician who serves as a government senator.
