= Ezekiel Bazil =

Dominican politician

Ezekiel Bazil (born 16 November 1965) is a Dominican politician who has served in the House of Assembly of Dominica since 2010. He is the current president of the United Workers' Party.

Bazil earned numerous certifications in the insurance industry and worked in Barbados and Antigua. He then moved back to Dominica, where he again worked in insurance and also as a managing director of a local company.

Bazil's first venture into politics was to contest the Wesley constituency on the UWP ticket in the 2009 general election. He lost on 18 December 2009 to Gloria Shillingford of the Labour Party, with 734 votes to Shillingford's 809 (47.6% to 52.4%). He was subsequently appointed to serve as a Senator by the Opposition Leader Hector John on 5 August 2010.

Bazil was elected president of the UWP at its January 2012 convention.
