= Dominica Progressive Party =

Minor political party in Dominica

The Dominica Progressive Party was a minor political party in Dominica. It contested the 1985 general elections under the name Dominica Progressive Force, receiving only 78 votes (0.2%) and failing to win a seat. It changed its name prior to the 1990 elections, but received only 74 votes (0.2%) and again failed to win a seat. Although it did not participate in the elections in 1995 and 2000, it returned for the 2005 elections in which it put forward three candidates but failed to win a seat. In the 2009 elections it received only 24 votes.
