= Dominica Association of Industry and Commerce =

- Founded: 1973
- Type: advocacy group
- Purpose: Business advocacy
- Location: Roseau
- Region served: Dominica
- Method: Media attention, direct-appeal campaigns Political lobbying
- Key people: President-Francis Emanuel

The Dominica Association of Industry and Commerce (DAIC) is a Chamber of Commerce in the Dominica. It is responsible for the representation of private sector interests in Dominica.
