= Chekira Lockhart Hypolite =

Dominican politician

Member of the House of Assembly of Dominica
- Incumbent
- Assumed office 6 December 2019

Personal details
- Party: Dominica Labour Party

Chekira Lockhart Hypolite is a Dominican politician from the Dominica Labour Party. She is currently the Member of Parliament for Roseau South.

She was elected in the 2019 general election.
