= Irving McIntyre =

Dominican politician

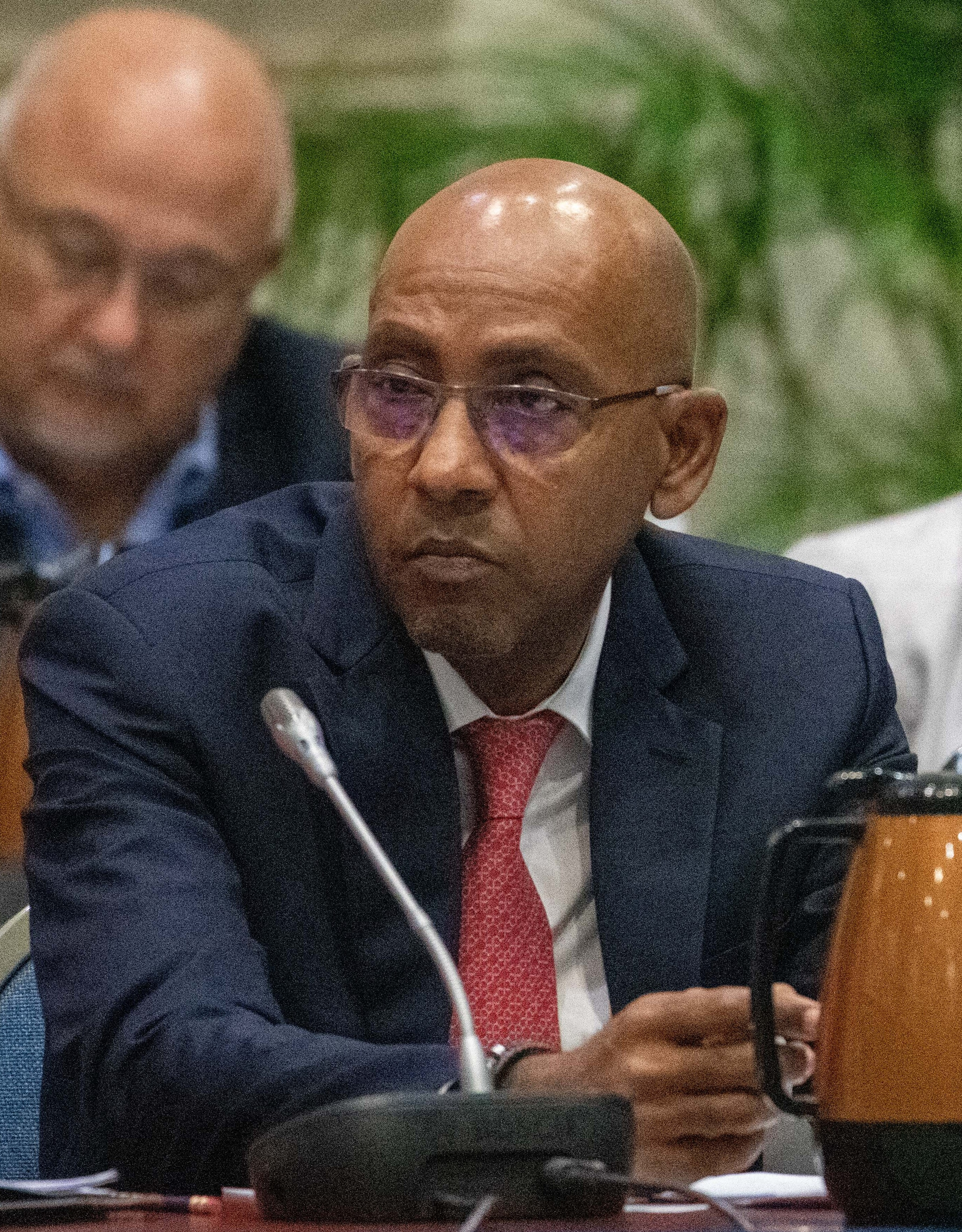

Deputy Prime Minister of Dominica
- Incumbent
- Assumed office 13 December 2022
- Prime Minister: Roosevelt Skerrit
- Preceded by: Reginald Austrie

Personal details
- Born: 2 October 1963 (age 62) Fond Canie
- Party: Dominica Labour Party

Dr. Irving Francis McIntyre is a Dominican politician and doctor and current cabinet minister.

McIntyre was born on 2 October 2, 1963 in Fond Canie, Saint George Parish. His educational background includes training in St. Mary's Academy and Indira Gandhi Medical College (1996).

McIntyre served as medical officer at the Princess Margaret Hospital's accident and emergency department from 1999 to 2010. He then started private practice, and as general practitioner, he has also provided free clinics to patients. He has worked as medical doctor for Caribbean Amateur Boxing Association, Dominica Cricket Association and Dominica Football Association.

McIntyre was elected as a member of the House of Assembly of Dominica for Roseau Valley constituency in the 2019 elections as the candidate of Dominica Labour Party. In December 2019, he was appointed Minister for Health, Wellness and New Health Investment to replace Kenneth Darroux. He was appointed in December 2022 Minister of Finance. He has also been appointed Deputy Prime Minister of Dominica.
