= Gertrude Roberts =

Dominica educator and politician (1930–2019)

for the composer, see Gertrud Hermine Kuenzel Roberts

Gertrude Roberts (September 16, 1930 – November 6, 2019) was an educator and politician in Dominica.

== Life ==
She was born in Delices and received her national teacher's certificate in 1952. She pursued further studies, completing an advanced certificate at the Leeward Islands Teacher's College and earning a certificate in educational studies from the University of Newcastle upon Tyne's Institute of Education. She taught and was principal at various schools across Dominica. She also served as program coordinator for the National Council of Women for Dominica.

Roberts received a National Service Award in 1973.

In 1979, she helped form the "Pickaxe Brigade" to assist with reconstruction following Hurricane David.

Roberts was elected in the district of Morne Jaune/Riviere Cyrique in 1990, in 1995 and in 2000. When the United Workers' Party won the 1995 general election, she was named Minister of Community Development and Women's Affairs, a post she held until 2000.

She had six children, and her daughter Gretta Roberts was elected to represent her former district in December 2019.
