= Catherine Daniel =

Dominican politician

Lady Catherine Daniel is a Dominican politician from the Dominica Labour Party. She is currently the Member of Parliament for Colihaut.
