= Kenneth Darroux =

Dominican politician and doctor

Kenneth Melchoir Darroux is a Dominican politician and doctor. He is currently serving as the Minister of Foreign Affairs since 17 December 2019 in Dominica. Prior to his appointment as Foreign Affairs Minister he was the Minister for Health and Social Services in the government of Roosevelt Skerrit. He is a member of the Dominica Labour Party (DLP).
