= 1990 Dominican general election =

- 28 May 1990

21 of the 30 seats in the House of Assembly 11 seats needed for a majority
- Registered: 50,557
- Turnout: 66.64% (▼7.92pp)
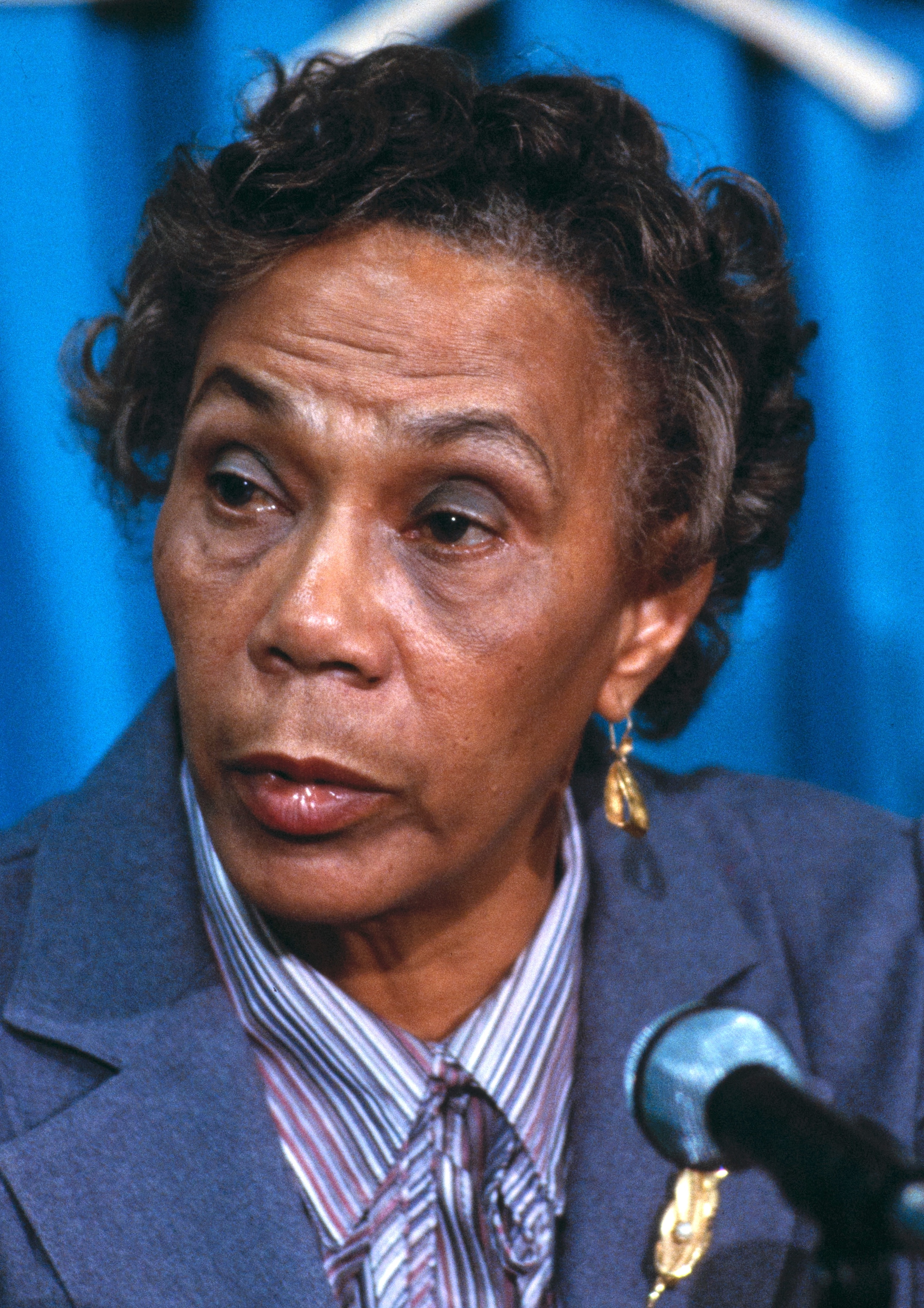

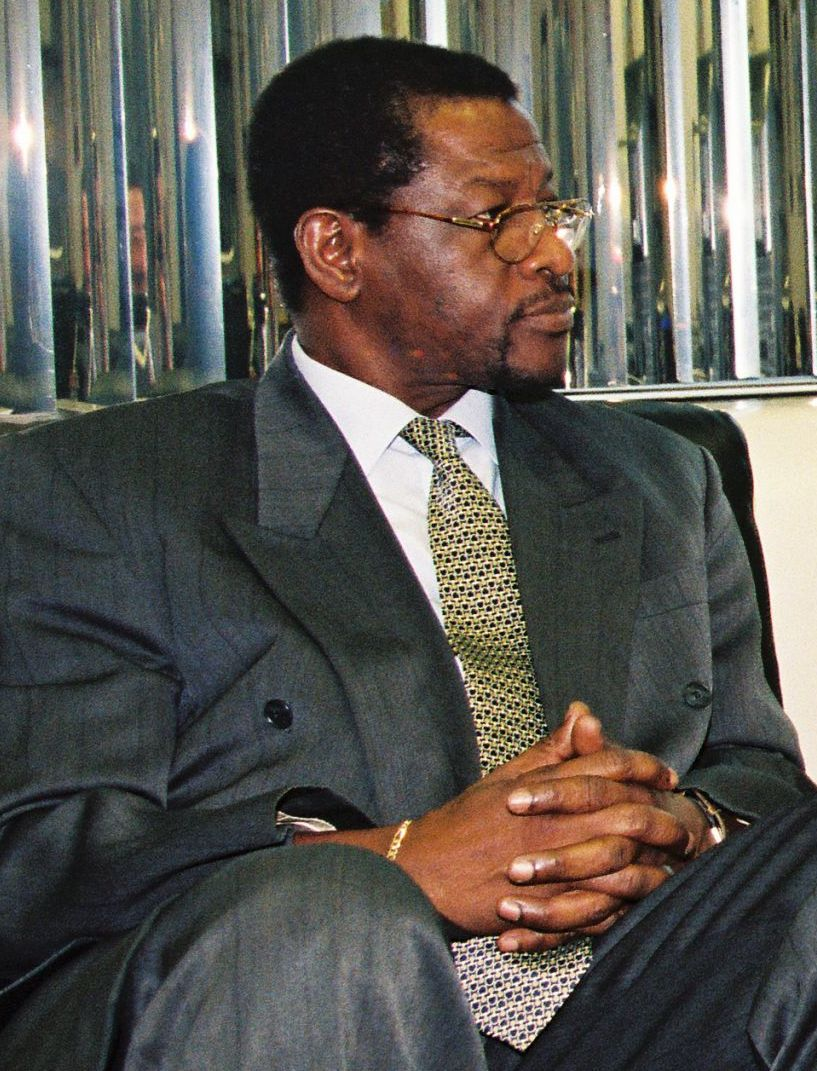

	First party	Second party	Third party
Leader	Eugenia Charles	Edison James	Michael Douglas
Party	DFP	UWP	DLP
Last election	56.58%, 15 seats	–	39.10%, 5 seats
Seats won	11	6	4
Seat change	▼4	New	▼1
Popular vote	16,529	8,979	7,860
Percentage	49.43%	26.85%	23.50%
Swing	▼7.15pp	New	▼15.60pp
- Results by constituency
Prime Minister before election
Eugenia Charles
DFP
Elected Prime Minister
Eugenia Charles
DFP

General elections were held in Dominica on 28 May 1990. The result was a victory for the Dominica Freedom Party, which won 11 of the 21 seats. Voter turnout was 66.6%, the lowest since universal suffrage was introduced in 1951.

== Results ==
Results by constituency

Party	Votes	%	Seats	+/–
Dominica Freedom Party	16,529	49.43	11	–4
United Workers' Party	8,979	26.85	6	New
Dominica Labour Party	7,860	23.50	4	–2
Dominica Progressive Party	74	0.22	0	New
Total	33,442	100.00	21	0
Valid votes	33,442	99.26		
Invalid/blank votes	251	0.74		
Total votes	33,693	100.00		
Registered voters/turnout	50,557	66.64		
Source: Nohlen

=== List of elected members ===
Constituency	Party	Elected member
Castle Bruce	UWP	Romanus Bannis
Colihaut	DFP	Clem A. Shillingford
Cottage	DFP	Alleyne J. Carbon
Grand Bay	DLP	Pierre Charles
La Plaine	DFP	Heskeith A. Alexander
Mahaut	DFP	Brian Alleyne
Marigot	UWP	Edison James
Morne Jaune/Riviere Cyrique	UWP	Gertrude Roberts
Paix Bouche	DFP	Jenner Armour
Petite Savanne	DLP	Urban Baron
Portsmouth	DLP	Michael Douglas
Roseau-Central	DFP	Eugenia Charles
Roseau-North	DFP	Allan A. Guye
Roseau-South	DFP	Ossie F. Walsh
Roseau-Valley	DFP	Henry George
Salisbury	UWP	Earl Williams
Salybia	DLP	Worrel Sanford
St. Joseph	UWP	Doreen Paul
Soufrière	DFP	Charles Maynard
Vieille Case	DFP	Maynard Joseph
Wesley	UWP	Edgar W. B. Jerome
Source: Electoral Office
