= Julius Timothy =

Dominican politician (1953–2025)

Deputy Prime Minister of Dominica
- In office June 1995 – February 2000
- Prime Minister: Edison James

Personal details
- Born: 12 June 1953
- Died: 19 October 2025 (aged 72)
- Party: United Workers' Party

Julius Timothy (12 June 1953 – 19 October 2025) was a Dominican politician. He held an MBA from the University of the West Indies and was president of the Dominica Association of Industry and Commerce. From June 1995 he had served as MP for the Roseau North Constituency and he served as Health Minister. He first became active in politics as a founding member of the United Workers' Party (UWP). He was Deputy Leader of the UWP from its inception until December 2005 and he was appointed Minister of Finance, Industry and Planning from June 1995 to February 2000 during the UWP-led administration. He was also Deputy Prime Minister in the UWP administration. Following a leadership struggle after the 5 May 2005 general elections, Timothy crossed the floor and became a member of the Dominica Labour Party. Timothy died on 19 October 2025, at the age of 72.
