= Melissa Poponne Skerrit =

Dominican politician

Melissa Poponne Skerrit (born 4 May 1981) is a Dominican politician in the Dominica Labour Party who has been serving as Minister of Housing. She has been a member of the House of Assembly for the Roseau Central constituency since the 2019 general election. Skerrit is married to Prime Minister Roosevelt Skerrit and they have two children.
