= 2022 Dominican general election =

- 6 December 2022

21 of the 30 seats in the House of Assembly 11 seats needed for a majority
- Registered: 60,330
- Turnout: 31.60% (▼22.96pp)
	First party
Leader	Roosevelt Skerrit
Party	DLP
Last election	58.95%, 18 seats
Seats won	19
Seat change	▲1
Popular vote	15,214
Percentage	82.38%
Swing	▲23.43pp
Prime Minister before election
Roosevelt Skerrit
DLP
Elected Prime Minister
Roosevelt Skerrit
DLP

Snap general elections were held in Dominica on 6 December 2022. Boycotted by the opposition United Workers' Party (UWP) and Dominica Freedom Party (DFP), the ruling Dominica Labour Party led by Roosevelt Skerrit, who had been prime minister since 2004, retained its supermajority in the House of Assembly by winning 19 of the 21 elected seats. Turnout was low at only 32%, the first time in Dominican history that less than half of eligible voters participated in a general election.

== Background ==
Originally scheduled to be held in 2024, on 6 November 2022 (three days after independence day), Prime Minister Roosevelt Skerrit called a snap election "to ensure the continued renewal" of his government. Nomination day would be 18 November, and the election itself on 6 December. The ruling Dominica Labour Party (DLP) announced its candidates on 8 November.

Opposition parties, including former ruling parties United Workers' Party (UWP) and Dominica Freedom Party (DFP), and civil society organisations published an open letter on 9 November condemning Skerrit's call for elections. External observers, including the OAS, the Commonwealth Secretariat, Caricom, and the Caribbean Court of Justice, had made recommendations for electoral reform in Dominica in order to assuage concerns of voter fraud, among other reasons. By 2022, Skerrit had implemented none. In light of this situation, the UWP and the DFP decided to boycott the elections and call on President Charles Savarin to reconvene the Assembly. In a separate letter, the nonpartisan Nature Island Dominica Civil Liberties Foundation (NIDCLF) pointed out irregularities in past elections which occurred due to the lack of reforms.

A three-month-old party which did not sign the open letter, Team Unity Dominica (TUD), announced its readiness to take on the DLP, and asked for support from other opposition parties. TUD general secretary Alex Bruno also claimed to be in contact with potential defectors from the DLP. Individual independent candidates have also announced plans to contest the election.

Political scientist Peter Wickham pointed out that the call for elections occurred soon after the UWP's leader resigned, so that Skerrit would avoid competition from a new opposition leader.

== Electoral system ==
The 21 elected members of the House of Assembly are elected in single-member constituencies under first-past-the-post voting. A further nine members are either elected by the Assembly after it convenes or appointed by the President (five on the advice of the prime minister and four on the advice of the Leader of the Opposition) to be Senators; from there the President is chosen by the Assembly and the President appoints a Prime Minister.

== Candidates ==
45 candidates were nominated, 19 of whom were independent candidates. Ten of the incumbent DLP members were not nominated for a new term.

In six constituencies the DLP nominee was the only candidate, winning by default. PM Skerrit and Health Minister Irving McIntyre were re-elected in this manner. The remaining four were new nominees.

== Conduct ==
The Commonwealth Secretariat, Organization of American States (OAS), Caribbean Community (CARICOM) and the Latin American Council of Electoral Experts (LACEE) sent election observers with the Commonwealth of Nations concluding that "election day and the pre-election atmosphere were largely peaceful and voters were free to exercise their franchise, the results of which are a collective will of those who voted. They also commended Electoral Office and its staff on their performance during the electoral process," noting that "while wholly consistent with the Constitution, the announcement of the snap elections on 6 November created certain challenges for some stakeholders."

== Results ==
Party	Votes	%	Seats	+/–
Dominica Labour Party	15,214	82.38	19	+1
Team Unity Dominica	153	0.83	0	New
Independents	3,102	16.80	2	New
Total	18,469	100.00	21	0
Valid votes	18,469	96.87		
Invalid/blank votes	597	3.13		
Total votes	19,066	100.00		
Registered voters/turnout	60,330	31.60		
Source: Electoral Office

=== List of elected members ===
Constituency	Party	Elected member	Notes
Castle Bruce	DLP	Octavia Alfred	
Colihaut	DLP	Daren Pinard	Unopposed
Cottage	DLP	Roland Royer	Unopposed
Grand Bay	DLP	Vince Henderson	
La Plaine	DLP	Cassandra Williams	
Mahaut	DLP	Cassanni Laville	
Marigot	IND	Anthony S. Charles	
Morne Jaune/Riviere Cyrique	DLP	Gretta Roberts	
Paix Bouche	DLP	Lakeyia Joseph	Unopposed
Petite Savanne	DLP	Jullan Defoe	Unopposed
Portsmouth	DLP	Fenella Wenham	
Roseau-Central	DLP	Melissa Poponne Skerrit	
Roseau-North	DLP	Miriam Blanchard	
Roseau-South	DLP	Chekirah N. Lockhart	
Roseau-Valley	DLP	Irving McIntyre	Unopposed
Salisbury	IND	Jesma Paul	
Salybia	DLP	Cozier P. Frederick	
St. Joseph	DLP	Darron T. Lloyd	
Soufrière	DLP	Denise Charles	
Vieille Case	DLP	Roosevelt Skerrit	Unopposed
Wesley	DLP	Fidel N. Grant	
Source: Electoral Office
