= 2014 Dominican general election =

Election in Dominica

- 8 December 2014

21 of the 30 seats in the House of Assembly 11 seats needed for a majority
- Registered: 72,279
- Turnout: 56.99% (▲1.88pp)
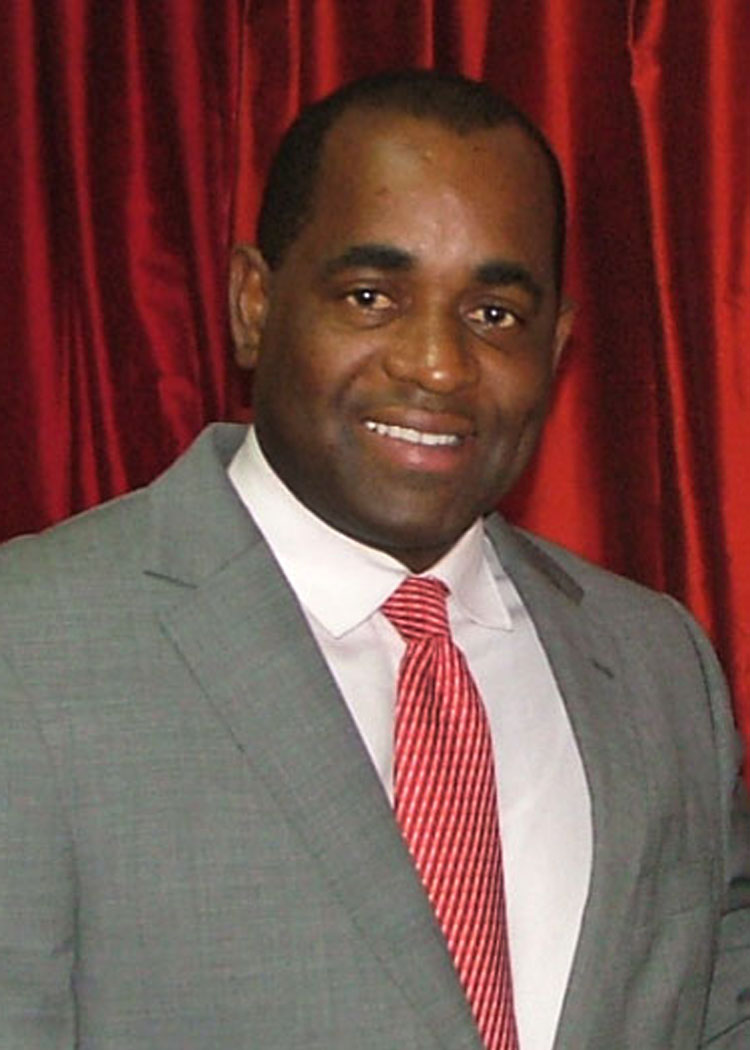

	First party	Second party
Leader	Roosevelt Skerrit	Lennox Linton
Party	DLP	UWP
Leader's seat	Vieille Case	Marigot
Last election	18 seats, 61.34%	3 seats, 34.73%
Seats won	15 seats	6 seats
Seat change	▼3	▲3
Popular vote	23,208	17,479
Percentage	56.99%	42.92%
Swing	▼4.35pp	▲8.19pp
- Results by constituency
Prime Minister before election
Roosevelt Skerrit
DLP
Elected Prime Minister
Roosevelt Skerrit
DLP

General elections were held in Dominica on 8 December 2014 to elect the 21 members of the House of Assembly. Prime Minister Roosevelt Skerrit announced the election date on 5 November 2014 and Nomination Day was held on 19 November. Under Dominica's electoral system, the Prime Minister has the authority to call elections at any time and is only required to give a minimum of twenty-five days' notice.

The ruling social democratic Dominica Labour Party lost three seats but retained a commanding majority, with 15 of the 21 seats in Parliament. The remaining six seats were won by the centre-right United Workers' Party, which has remained the sole opposition party in Parliament since the 2005 election.

== Electoral system ==
The 21 elected members of the House of Assembly were elected in single-member constituencies. A further nine members were appointed by the President, five on the advice of the Prime Minister and four on the advice of the Leader of the Opposition.

== Campaign ==
Forty-four candidates contested the twenty-one constituencies; the two dominant parties (Dominica Labour Party and United Workers' Party) ran candidates in each constituency, whilst two independent candidates also participated in the elections.

== Results ==
The opposition gained three seats, winning all three constituencies in the capital Roseau, and three constituencies in a rural belt across the lower part of northern Dominica.

Party	Votes	%	Seats	+/–
Dominica Labour Party	23,208	56.99	15	–3
United Workers' Party	17,479	42.92	6	+3
Independents	37	0.09	0	0
Total	40,724	100.00	21	0
Valid votes	40,724	98.86		
Invalid/blank votes	471	1.14		
Total votes	41,195	100.00		
Registered voters/turnout	72,279	56.99		
Source: Electoral Office

=== List of elected members ===
Constituency	Party	Elected member
Castle Bruce	DLP	Johnson Drigo
Colihaut	DLP	Catherine Daniel
Cottage	DLP	Reginald Austrie
Grand Bay	DLP	Justina Charles
La Plaine	DLP	Petter Saint-Jean
Mahaut	DLP	Rayburn J. Blackmoore
Marigot	UWP	Lennox Linton
Morne Jaune/Riviere Cyrique	DLP	Ivor Stephenson
Paix Bouche	DLP	Roselyn Paul
Petite Savanne	DLP	Kenneth Darroux
Portsmouth	DLP	Ian Douglas
Roseau-Central	UWP	Joseph Isaac
Roseau-North	UWP	Daniel Lugay
Roseau-South	UWP	Joshua Francis
Roseau-Valley	DLP	John C. Mc Intyre
Salisbury	UWP	Hector John
Salybia	DLP	Casius Darroux
St. Joseph	DLP	Kelver D. Darroux
Soufrière	DLP	Ian Pinard
Vieille Case	DLP	Roosevelt Skerrit
Wesley	UWP	Ezekiel Bazil
Source: Electoral Office
