= Dominica Freedom Party =

- Leader: Bernard Hurtault
- Founded: October 1968
- Ideology: Conservatism
- Political position: Centre-right to right-wing
- Regional affiliation: Caribbean Democrat Union
- House of Assembly: 0 / 21

Website
- http://www.dfpda.com/about.html

The Dominica Freedom Party (DFP) is a conservative political party in Dominica. It shares much of the same socially and economically conservative principles as the Conservative Party in the UK. The party has been led by Bernard Hurtault since 2021.

== History ==
The founders of Dominica Freedom Party in 1968 included Eugenia Charles, Elkin Henry, Anthony Moise, Eustace Francis, Robert Allfrey, Phyllis Allfrey, E. C. Loblack, Edward Scobie, Loftus Roberts, Antony Agar, Star Lestrade and Martin Sorhaindo. The DFP was led by Dame Eugenia Charles from 1972 until 1995. She became Prime Minister in 1980 and served until her 1995 retirement. Following her resignation as party leader and the defeat of the DFP in the 1995 elections by the United Workers' Party, she was succeeded by Brian Alleyne.

In 1996, Charles Savarin became the leader of the DFP. He had presided over the continuing decline of the DFP following the 2000 general election. Despite this the party still holds a degree of influence due to its accommodation with the DLP government. Even after losing all its seats and the DLP winning enough seats to form a government on their own, the DLP leader and prime minister, Roosevelt Skerrit appointed Savarin as a senator and gave him the key post of foreign minister. Many members of the DFP have criticized Savarin for his continued support for their erstwhile foes, the DLP.

During the previous elections held on 31 January 2000, the party won two of the 21 popularly elected seats with 13.6% of votes cast. The party subsequently joined a coalition government with the Dominica Labour Party (DLP), with the DLP not having enough seats to form a government on their own.

The party lost all of its seats in the House of Assembly at 2005 general election, held on 5 May 2005. This was the first time since 1975 that the DFP was not elected in any seats. The party garnered 3.15% of votes cast.

However on 5 August 2007 a new executive was elected, with businessman Michael Astaphan being elected as political Leader.

In 2022 Dominican general election, DFP decided to boycott the election., which in result Dominica Labour Party secured 19 out of 21 seats.

In recent years, the DFP has expressed concerns over national issues. For example, they have been vocal about the impact of the UK's decision to impose travel restrictions on Dominican nationals, linking it to alleged issues with Dominica’s Citizenship by Investment Program (CBI). The party criticized the current administration's management of the program and called for immediate action to address the concerns raised by the UK and other nations.

== Leadership ==
- Eugenia Charles, 1972-1995
- Brian Alleyne, 1995-1996
- Charles Savarin, 1996-2007
- Michael Astaphan, 2007-2008
- Judith Pestaina, 2008-2012
- Michael Astaphan, 2012-2017
- Kent Vital, 2017-2021
- Bernard Hurtault, 2021-

== International affiliations ==
The Dominica Freedom Party is affiliated with the Caribbean Democrat Union and the International Democrat Union

== Electoral history ==
=== House of Assembly elections ===
Election	Party leader	Votes	%	Seats	+/–	Position	Result
1970	Eugenia Charles	7,578	38.3%	2 / 11	▲2	▲2nd	Opposition
1975	Eugenia Charles	6,920	32.4%	3 / 21	▲1	2nd	Opposition
1980	Eugenia Charles	15,706	51.3%	17 / 21	▲14	▲1st	Supermajority government
1985	Eugenia Charles	18,865	56.7%	15 / 21	▼2	1st	Supermajority government
1990	Eugenia Charles	16,529	49.4%	11 / 21	▼4	1st	Majority government
1995	Brian Alleyne	13,317	35.8%	5 / 21	▼6	▼2nd	Opposition
2000	Charles Savarin	4,858	13.6%	2 / 21	▼3	▼3rd	DFP–DLP coalition government
2005	Charles Savarin	1,194	3.15%	0 / 21	▼2	3rd	Extra-parliamentary
2009	Judith Pestaina	866	2.39%	0 / 21	Steady	3rd	Extra-parliamentary
2014	Michael Astaphan	Did not contest					Extra-parliamentary
2019	Kent Vital	Endorsed United Workers' Party					Extra-parliamentary
2022	Bernard Hurtault	Boycotted					Extra-parliamentary
