= 2019 Dominican general election =

- 6 December 2019

21 of the 30 seats in the House of Assembly 11 seats needed for a majority
- Registered: 74,896
- Turnout: 54.56% (▼2.43pp)
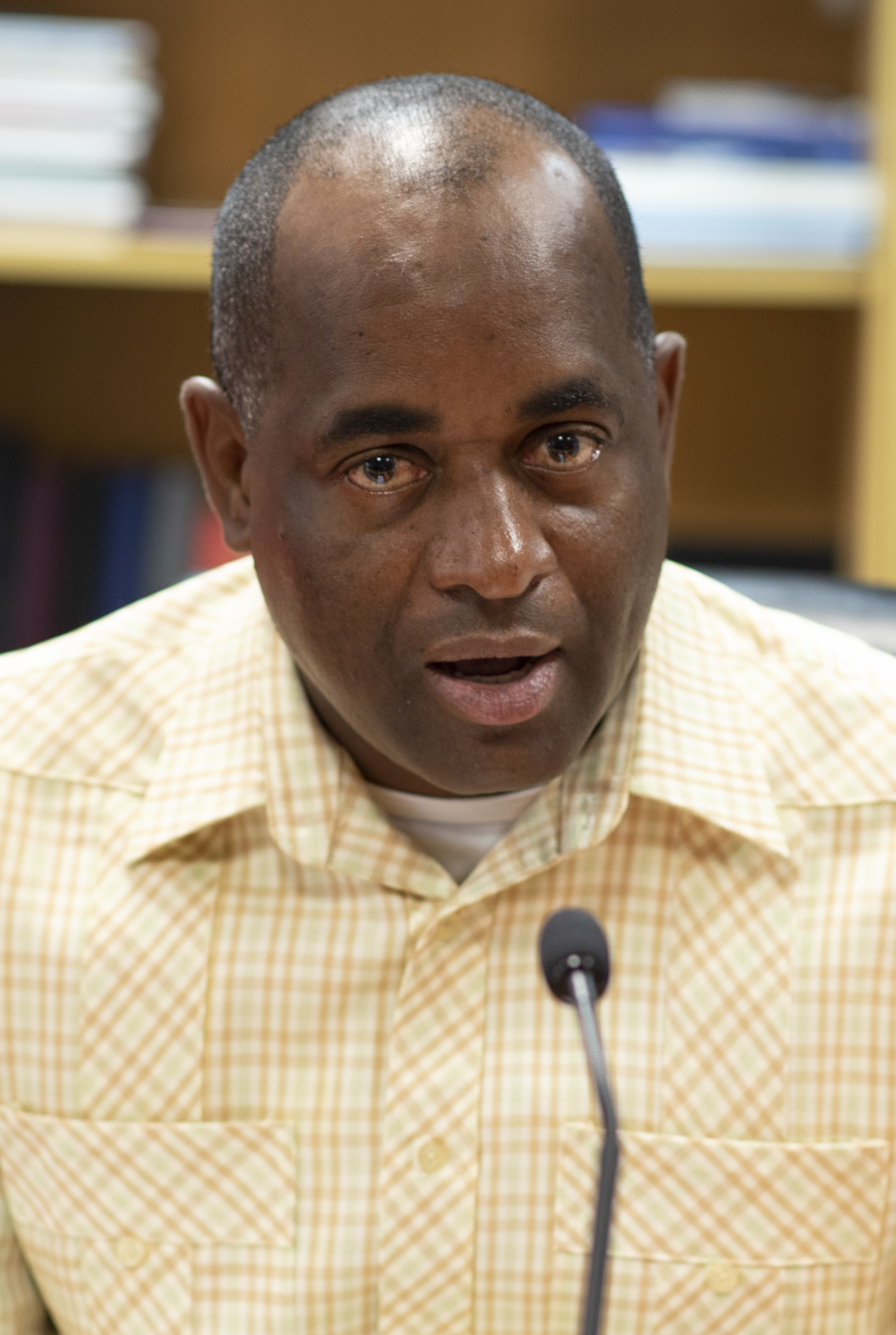

	First party	Second party
Leader	Roosevelt Skerrit	Lennox Linton
Party	DLP	UWP
Last election	56.99%, 15 seats	42.92%, 6 seats
Seats won	18	3
Seat change	▲3	▼3
Popular vote	23,403	16,299
Percentage	58.95%	41.05%
Swing	▲1.96pp	▼1.87pp
- Results by constituency
Prime Minister before election
Roosevelt Skerrit
DLP
Elected Prime Minister
Roosevelt Skerrit
DLP

General elections were held in Dominica on 6 December 2019. The elections were constitutionally due by March 2020, but had been widely expected to take place before the end of 2019. The result was a landslide victory for the ruling Dominica Labour Party, which won 18 of the 21 elected seats, gaining three seats. With the DLP winning a fifth consecutive election, DLP leader Roosevelt Skerrit remained Prime Minister.

== Electoral system ==
The 21 elected members of the House of Assembly are elected in single-member constituencies. A further nine members are either elected by the Assembly after it convenes or appointed by the President (five on the advice of the Prime Minister and four on the advice of the Leader of the Opposition) to be Senators; the method of their choosing is voted on by popular vote, the vote is to determine which party is in power, from there the President is chosen by the Assembly and the President appoints a Prime Minister.

== Results ==
The result followed disruptive protests including blocking roads by the United Workers' Party, which demanded changes to the electoral system. Following the results, Skerrit said "I call to the UWP and its supporters to hold their conduct and behaviour of the last few weeks, concede the election and work for peace."

Party	Votes	%	Seats	+/–
Dominica Labour Party	23,643	59.01	18	+3
United Workers' Party	16,424	40.99	3	–3
Total	40,067	100.00	21	0
Valid votes	40,067	98.05		
Invalid/blank votes	797	1.95		
Total votes	40,864	100.00		
Registered voters/turnout	74,896	54.56		
Source: Electoral Office, Caribbean Elections

=== By constituency ===
The following are the election results by constituency from the Electoral Office.

2019 Castle Bruce House of Assembly election
Candidate	Party	Votes	%
Octavia Alfred	Dominica Labour Party	842	51.03
Ernie Jno-Finn	United Workers' Party	808	48.97
Total		1,650	100.00

2019 Colihaut House of Assembly election
Candidate	Party	Votes	%
Catherine Daniel	Dominica Labour Party	677	78.54
Nicholas George	United Workers' Party	185	21.46
Total		862	100.00

2019 Cottage House of Assembly election
Candidate	Party	Votes	%
Reginald Austrie	Dominica Labour Party	948	73.83
Marcus Romain	United Workers' Party	336	26.17
Total		1,284	100.00

2019 Grand Bay House of Assembly election
Candidate	Party	Votes	%
Edward Registe	Dominica Labour Party	1,532	87.89
Nept Pacquette	United Workers' Party	211	12.11
Total		1,743	100.00

2019 La Plaine House of Assembly election
Candidate	Party	Votes	%
Kent Edwards	Dominica Labour Party	742	52.74
Francisca Joseph	United Workers' Party	665	47.26
Total		1,407	100.00

2019 Mahaut House of Assembly election
Candidate	Party	Votes	%
Rayburn J. Blackmoore	Dominica Labour Party	2,191	54.02
Felix H. Thomas	United Workers' Party	1,865	45.98
Total		4,056	100.00

2019 Marigot House of Assembly election
Candidate	Party	Votes	%
Lennox Linton	United Workers' Party	882	76.63
Gregory Riviere	Dominica Labour Party	269	23.37
Total		1,151	100.00

2019 Morne Jaune/Riviere Cyrique House of Assembly election
Candidate	Party	Votes	%
Greta Roberts	Dominica Labour Party	601	52.63
Pharo Cuffy	United Workers' Party	541	47.37
Total		1,142	100.00

2019 Paix Bouche House of Assembly election
Candidate	Party	Votes	%
Roselyn Paul	Dominica Labour Party	1,138	84.93
Davis George	United Workers' Party	202	15.07
Total		1,340	100.00

2019 Petite Savanne House of Assembly election
Candidate	Party	Votes	%
Kenneth Darroux	Dominica Labour Party	1,192	70.41
Rosana Emmanuel	United Workers' Party	501	29.59
Total		1,693	100.00

2019 Portsmouth House of Assembly election
Candidate	Party	Votes	%
Ian Douglas	Dominica Labour Party	1,253	77.25
Jefferson F. James	United Workers' Party	369	22.75
Total		1,622	100.00

2019 Roseau Central House of Assembly election
Candidate	Party	Votes	%
Melissa Skerrit	Dominica Labour Party	1,063	54.99
Glenroy Cuffy	United Workers' Party	870	45.01
Total		1,933	100.00

2019 Roseau North House of Assembly election
Candidate	Party	Votes	%
Daniel Lugay	United Workers' Party	2,134	56.57
Joseph Isaac	Dominica Labour Party	1,638	43.43
Total		3,772	100.00

2019 Roseau South House of Assembly election
Candidate	Party	Votes	%
Chekirah Lockhart	Dominica Labour Party	2,194	53.10
Joshua Francis	United Workers' Party	1,938	46.90
Total		4,132	100.00

2019 Roseau Valley House of Assembly election
Candidate	Party	Votes	%
Irving McIntyre	Dominica Labour Party	1,118	59.28
Ronald Charles	United Workers' Party	768	40.72
Total		1,886	100.00

2019 Salisbury House of Assembly election
Candidate	Party	Votes	%
Hector John	United Workers' Party	866	61.86
Nicholls Esprit	Dominica Labour Party	534	38.14
Total		1,400	100.00

2019 Salybia House of Assembly election
Candidate	Party	Votes	%
Cozier Frederick	Dominica Labour Party	1,081	56.98
Anette Sanford	United Workers' Party	816	43.02
Total		1,897	100.00

2019 St. Joseph House of Assembly election
Candidate	Party	Votes	%
Adis King	Dominica Labour Party	1,324	60.15
Monell Williams	United Workers' Party	877	39.85
Total		2,201	100.00

2019 Soufrière House of Assembly election
Candidate	Party	Votes	%
Denise Charles	Dominica Labour Party	1,352	69.19
Samuel Christian	United Workers' Party	602	30.81
Total		1,954	100.00

2019 Vieille Case House of Assembly election
Candidate	Party	Votes	%
Roosevelt Skerrit	Dominica Labour Party	1,095	82.70
Clement Marcellin	United Workers' Party	229	17.30
Total		1,324	100.00

2019 Wesley House of Assembly election
Candidate	Party	Votes	%
Fidel Grant	Dominica Labour Party	859	53.09
Ezekiel Bazil	United Workers' Party	759	46.91
Total		1,618	100.00
