= House of Assembly of Dominica =

Unicameral legislature of Dominica

Coordinates: 15.2951°N 61.3852°W

- 11th Parliament

Type
- Type: Unicameral

History
- Founded: 1967

Leadership
- Speaker: Joseph Isaac since 10 February 2020

Structure
- Seats: 32 members
- Political groups: Governing party: Dominica Labour Party (19); Government Senators (5); Opposition party: Opposition Senators (4); Independent: Independent (2); Other members: Attorney General and Speaker (ex-officio) (2)

Elections
- Last election: 6 December 2022

Meeting place
- Roseau

Website
- www.dominica.gov.dm houseofassembly.gov.dm

The House of Assembly is the legislature of Dominica. It is established by Chapter III of the Constitution of Dominica, and together with the President of Dominica constitutes Dominica's Parliament. The House is unicameral, and consists of twenty-one Representatives, nine senators, and the Attorney General as an ex officio member. The Speaker of the House becomes the thirty-second member if chosen from outside the membership of the House.

Representatives are directly elected in single-member constituencies using the simple-majority (or first-past-the-post) system for a term of five years. The Representatives in turn decide whether the senators are to be elected by their vote, or appointed. If appointed, five are chosen by the president with the advice of the Prime Minister and four with the advice of the Leader of the Opposition. The current Senators are appointed.

The Cabinet of Dominica is appointed from members of the House of Assembly. However, no more than three senators may be members of the Cabinet.

== History ==
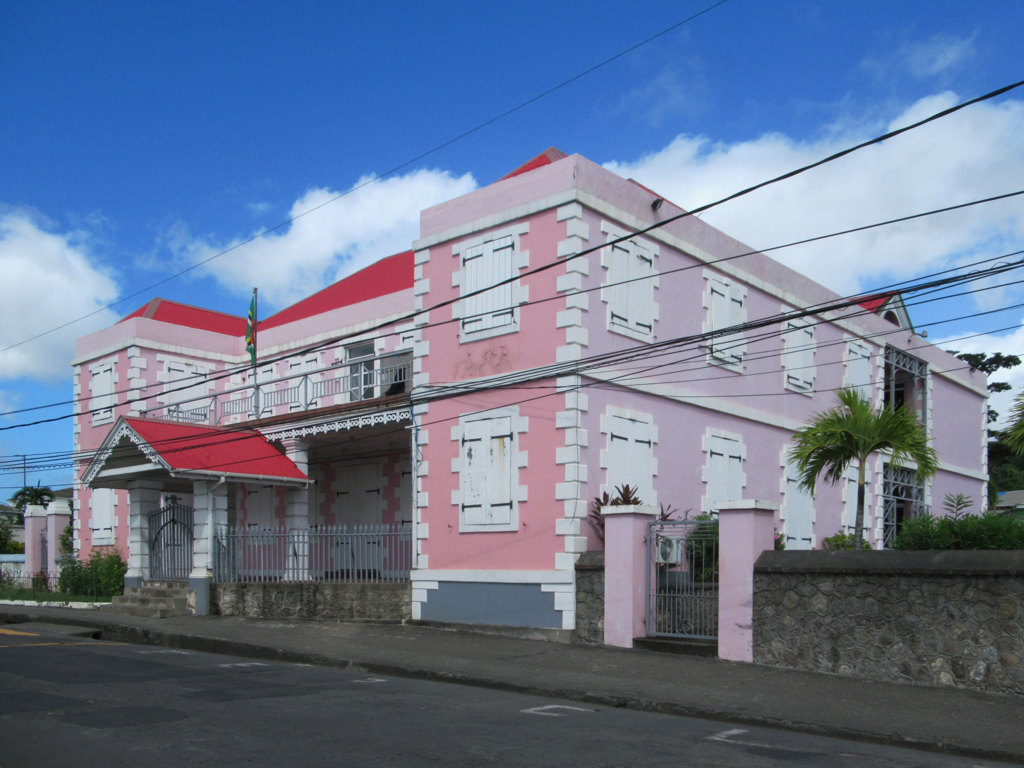
The Parliament building in Roseau

House of Assembly was established in 1967, and it was preceded by a colonial Legislative council.

== Representatives ==
Since the election held on 6 December 2022, the Dominica Labour Party holds 19 of the 21 directly elected seats, and independent candidates hold two elected seats. The new House of Assembly included a record ten women.

Constituency	Representative	Party	Notes
Castle Bruce	Octavia Alfred	DLP	
Colihaut	Daren Pinard	DLP	
Cottage	Roland Royer	DLP	
Grand Bay	Vince Henderson	DLP	
La Plaine	Cassandra Williams	DLP	
Mahaut	Cassanni Laville	DLP	
Marigot	Anthony S. Charles	IND	
Morne Jaune/Riviere Cyrique	Gretta Bernadette Roberts	DLP	
Paix Bouche	Lakeyia Joseph	DLP	
Petite Savanne	Jullan Defoe	DLP	
Portsmouth	Fenella Wenham	DLP	
Roseau Central	Melissa Ponponne Skerrit	DLP	
Roseau North	Miriam Blanchard	DLP	
Roseau South	Chekirah N. Lockhart	DLP	
Roseau Valley	Irving Francis McIntyre	DLP	
Salisbury	Jesma Paul	IND	
Salybia	Cozier Frederick	DLP	
St. Joseph	Darron T. Lloyd	DLP	
Soufrière	Denise Charles	DLP	Succeeded Ian Pinard in 2016 by-election.
Vieille Case	Roosevelt Skerrit	DLP	Assumed position of Prime Minister 8 January 2004.
Wesley	Fidel Grant	DLP	

== Senators ==
The Prime Minister and the Leader of the Opposition each get to appoint additional Senators, to join the elected Representatives. The following Senators are currently in office:

Senator	Party	Notes
Austelle Lockhart	DLP	Appointed with the advice of the Prime Minister.
Oscar George	DLP	Appointed with the advice of the Prime Minister.
Gregory Riviere	DLP	Appointed with the advice of the Prime Minister.
Phillip Rolle	DLP	Appointed with the advice of the Prime Minister.
Nicholas Esprit	DLP	Appointed with the advice of the Prime Minister.
Lori Victor	UWP	Appointed with the advice of the Leader of the Opposition.
Chalika Vidal		Appointed with the advice of the Leader of the Opposition.
Delbert Paris	UWP	Appointed with the advice of the Leader of the Opposition.
Lorraine Henderson-Reid	UWP	Appointed with the advice of the Leader of the Opposition.

== International affiliation(s) ==
- ACP–EU Joint Parliamentary Assembly
- Canada-CARICOM Parliamentary Friendship Group
- Commonwealth Parliamentary Association
- ParlAmericas

== See also ==
- List of legislatures by country
- List of members of the House of Assembly of Dominica
- List of speakers of the House of Assembly of Dominica
- Leader of the Opposition (Dominica)
- History of Dominica
