= Roosevelt Skerrit =

Prime Minister of Dominica since 2004

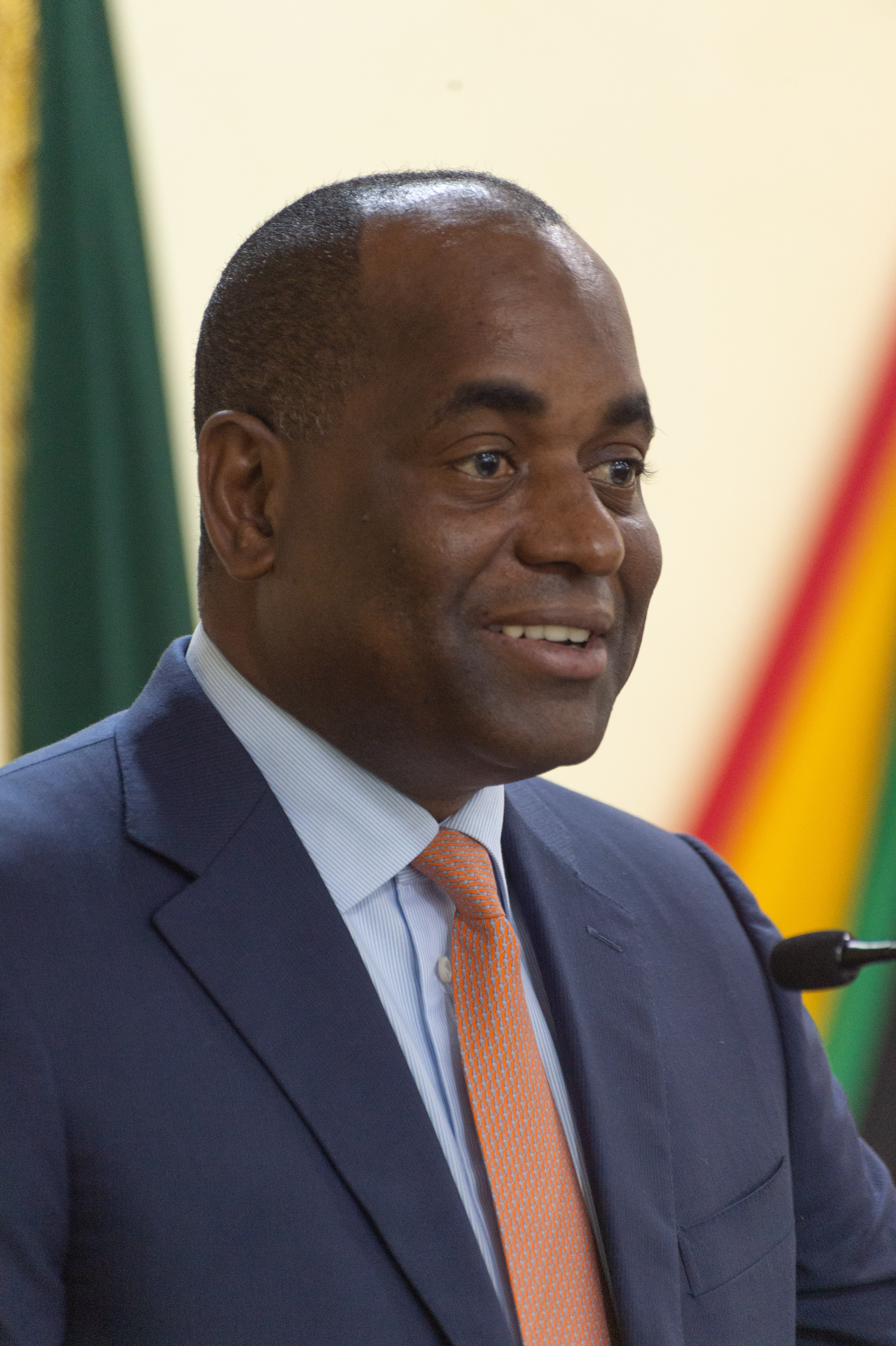
- Skerrit in 2014

6th Prime Minister of Dominica
- Incumbent
- Assumed office 8 January 2004
- President: Nicholas Liverpool; Eliud Williams; Charles Savarin; Sylvanie Burton
- Deputy: Ambrose George; Reginald Austrie; Irving McIntyre
- Preceded by: Osborne Riviere (acting)

Member of Parliament for Vieille Case
- Incumbent
- Assumed office 31 January 2000
- Preceded by: Vernice Bellony

Chairman of the Caribbean Community
- In office 1 July 2023 – 31 December 2023
- Secretary-General: Carla Barnett
- Preceded by: Philip Davis
- Succeeded by: Irfaan Ali
- In office 1 January 2010 – 30 June 2010
- Secretary-General: Edwin Carrington
- Preceded by: Bharrat Jagdeo
- Succeeded by: Bruce Golding

Personal details
- Born: 8 June 1972 (age 54) Princess Margaret Hospital, Roseau, Dominica
- Party: Dominica Labour Party
- Spouse: Melissa Poponne (m. 2013)
- Children: 3
- Education: New Mexico State University; University of Mississippi
- Website: Official website

Roosevelt Skerrit (born 8 June 1972), also known as "Roozey" or "Skerro", is a Dominican politician who has been Prime Minister of Dominica since 2004; he has also been the Member of Parliament for the Vieille Case constituency since 2000. Regionally, he has served as the chairman of the Organisation of Eastern Caribbean States (OECS) and, most recently, as chairman of the Caribbean Community (CARICOM) in 2010 and 2023. Skerrit is currently the longest-serving prime minister of Dominica, and, since the ousting of Ralph Gonsalves in November 2025, he has been the longest-serving democratic leader.

== Career ==
Skerrit became prime minister after the death of Pierre Charles in January 2004. At the time of Pierre Charles’ death, Skerrit was Member of Parliament for the Vieille Case constituency, a position he had held since his election in February 2000. In addition to being the Prime Minister, he has also served as Minister for Finance since 2004, Minister of Education, Sports and Youth Affairs, and Minister for Foreign Affairs and is the political leader of the Dominica Labour Party.

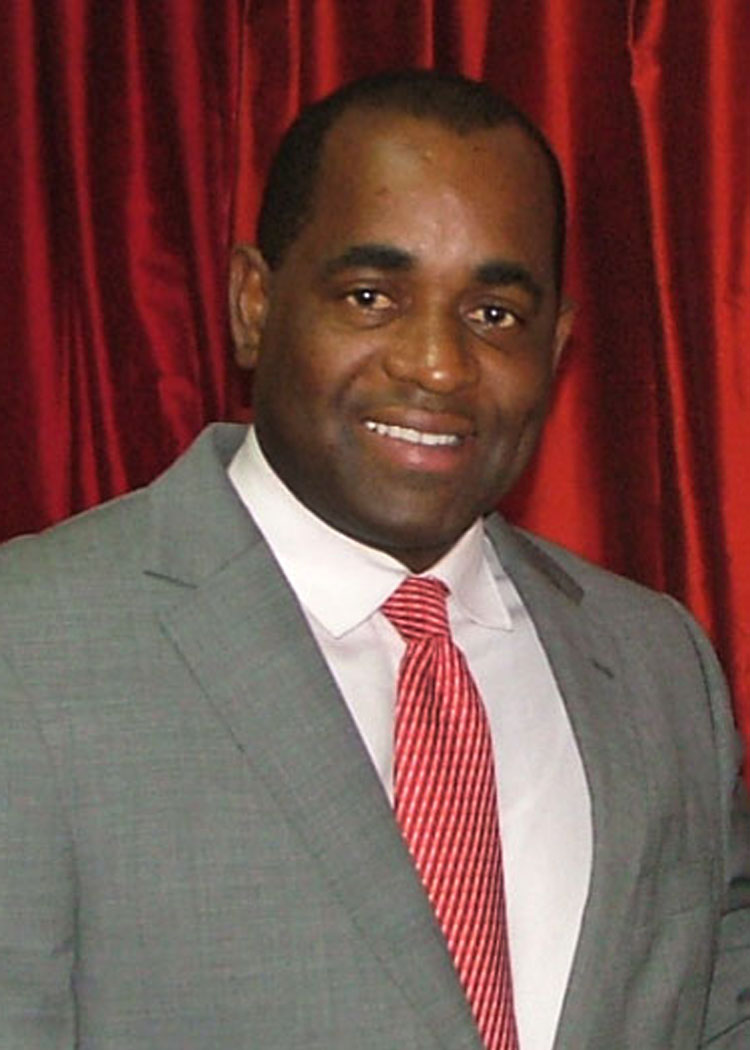
The current Prime Minister of the Commonwealth of Dominica, Roosevelt Skerrit

Upon taking office, Skerrit became the world's youngest head of government at age 33, surpassing Joseph Kabila of the Democratic Republic of the Congo. With his party's May 2005 election victory, Skerrit became the world's first democratically elected national leader born in the 1970s.

In 2015, the Chinese billionaire Ng Lap Seng was arrested by the FBI due to an ongoing UN bribery investigation. Skerrit was photographed with Ng shortly before the arrest. The Wall Street Journal stated that Ng told associates that he helped persuade Dominica to switch diplomatic recognition to China from Taiwan. The opposition party scrutinized Skerrit on the matter. Skerrit informed them that the FBI was not interested in him.

A 2019, an Al Jazeera investigation alleged that Skerrit had been receiving money in exchange for diplomatic passports and ambassadorships.

In December 2019, Skerrit won his fourth consecutive general election 18 seats to three, becoming the first Dominica Prime Minister to do so.

On 1 July 2023. Skerrit assumed the chairmanship of the Caribbean Community (CARICOM). He also chaired the meeting of the countries under the CARICOM and asked for the innovative ways to strengthen the region.

After the October 7 attacks in 2023, Skerrit called for a ceasefire in the Gaza war.

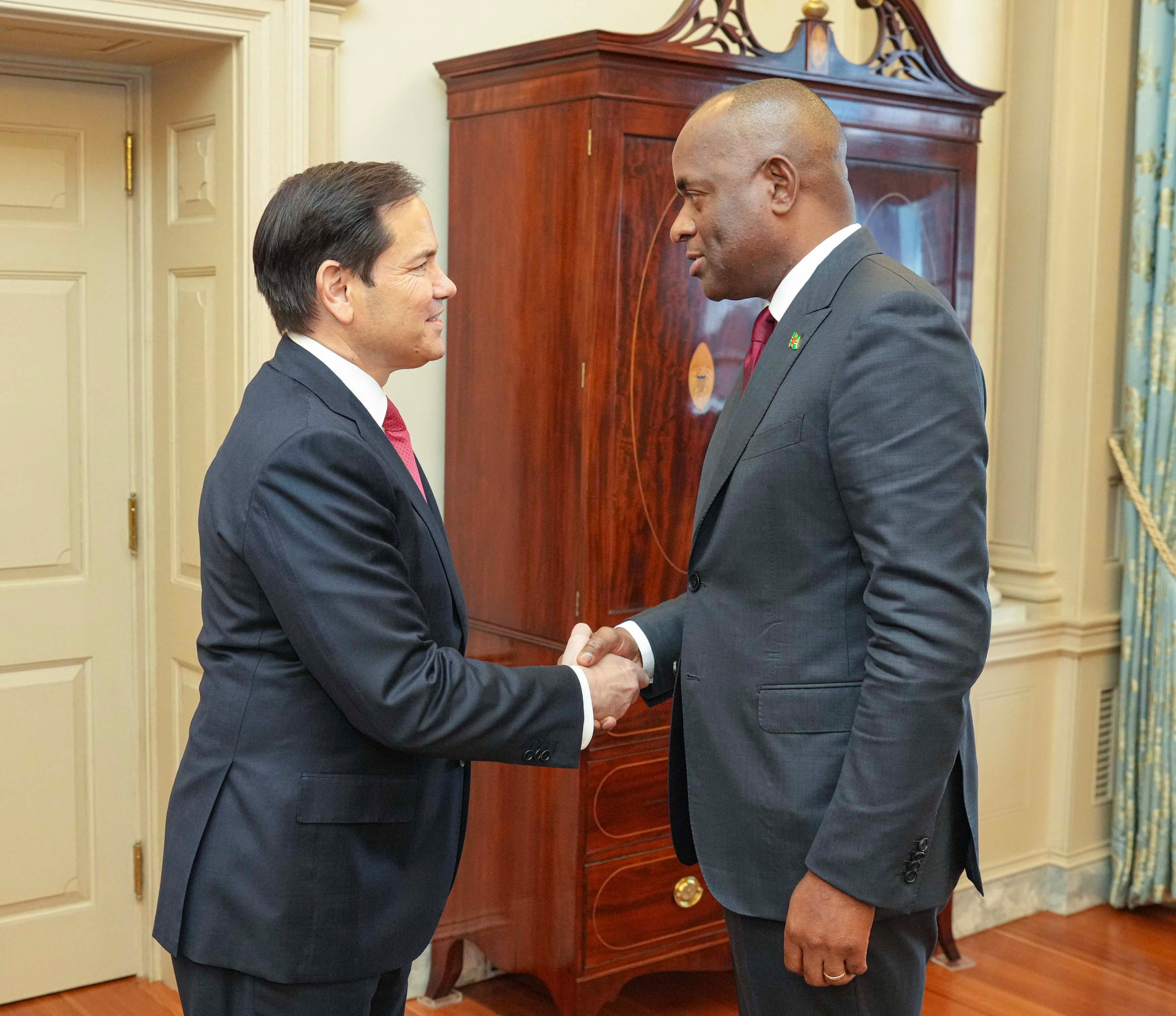
Skerrit with United States secretary of state Marco Rubio, in 2025

In November 2024, several election reform bills were introduced by the Dominica Labour Party in the House of Assembly, aiming to establish an independent electoral commission, update procedures for voting and counting votes, and streamline the voter registration process. However, critics, including the main opposition party, the United Workers Party, claim that these bills were passed without proper consultation from the Dominican people, leading to perceptions that the bills would essentially entrench the DLP's power. This, in turn, led to protests outside the Dominica Parliament. When these bills were passed in March 2025, more violent demonstrations soon flared up across the country, leading to the arrests of 24 people. In April 2025, the Inter-American Commission on Human Rights (IACHR) expressed concern about the electoral reform process, claiming that the bills passed in the House lack IACHR provisions such as regulations concerning campaign financing and safeguards to ensure the electoral commission's independence.

In January 2026, Skerrit's government reached an agreement with the United States to accept migrants deported from the latter country.

Political offices
Preceded by Osborne Riviere; Acting	Prime Minister of Dominica; 2004–present	Incumbent
