= United Workers' Party (Dominica) =

- Leader: Thomson Fontaine
- President: Lennox Linton
- Founded: 1988
- Headquarters: Roseau
- Political position: Centre
- House of Assembly: 0 / 21

Website
- www.uwp-dominica.com

The United Workers' Party (UWP) is a centrist political party in Dominica. As of the 2022 general election, the party is not represented in the House of Assembly of Dominica, after boycotting the general election. The past Leader of the Opposition in the Assembly is Lennox Linton.

The United Workers' Party with less than 34% of the votes was the majority party in Dominica's parliament from 1995 until 2000, led by party co-founder Edison James as Prime Minister of Dominica.

The party now has a new leader, Thomson Fontaine who is the current Leader of the Opposition. In the 2014 general elections, the party won 6 seats out of the 21. This was reduced to 3 in 2019, and 0 in 2022 following a boycott of the 2022 general elections.

== History ==
The party was founded in 1988 by Edison James, Julius Timothy, Vernice Bellony, Thomas Etienne, Norris Prevost, Dennis La Bassiere and others. In the 1990 elections, the UWP won 6 of the 21 seats and became the official opposition. In 1995, the UWP won 11 seats at the general elections forming the first UWP government headed by Edison James as prime minister.

At the 31 January 2000 elections, the party won 43.3% of the popular vote and 9 out of 21 elected members of parliament. Though it captured the most popular votes, it got fewer seats than the Dominica Labour Party. The party was therefore once again in opposition. James continued to lead the party, which set up a tough campaign for the 5 May 2005 elections, but lost 1 seat. After the election, this time receiving fewer votes than the Dominica Labour Party, the party held 8 seats in Parliament and remained in opposition.

In December 2005, James stood down as political leader and was replaced by Attorney Earl Williams, Minister of Communications and Works in the last UWP administration. Williams defeated founding member and then Deputy Leader Julius Timothy who also sought the leadership of the party. As a result Timothy, the Minister of Finance under the UWP government, left the party and crossed the floor to join the Dominica Labour Party government. This resulted in the UWP being reduced to seven seats in Parliament.

=== 2009-2010: general election, boycott, and by-election ===
In the general election held in December 2009, the UWP lost four of its seven seats, including the seat of party leader Ronald Green. The UWP subsequently filed litigation in the Roseau High Court challenging the results of five constituencies, including that of Prime Minister Roosevelt Skerrit, and demanding a new general election; pending the results, the three UWP members boycotted parliament. After two UWP members did not attend three consecutive sessions, Speaker of the House Alix Boyd Knights declared their seats vacant in April, and a by-election was scheduled for 9 July 2010. Both UWP members ran and won their seats again in the by-election, against the same candidates they faced in the 2009 general election.

UWP member Hector John was sworn in as Leader of the Opposition on 19 July 2010. Four of the six UWP legal petitions were dismissed in August 2010. The UWP members are expected to end their boycott, citing as a reason the President's announcement that funds would be made available for election reform.

Edison James was reelected political leader of the UWP at its January 2012 convention, and Ezekiel Bazil was elected the party's president.

== Electoral history ==
=== House of Assembly elections ===
Election	Party leader	Votes	%	Seats	+/–	Position	Result
1990	Edison James	8,979	26.9%	6 / 21	▲6	▲2nd	Opposition
1995	Edison James	12,777	34.4%	11 / 21	▲5	▲1st	Majority government
2000	Edison James	15,555	43.4%	9 / 21	▼2	▼2nd	Opposition
2005	Edison James	16,529	43.60%	8 / 21	▼1	2nd	Opposition
2009	Earl Williams	12,606	34.73%	3 / 21	▼5	2nd	Opposition
2014	Lennox Linton	17,479	42.92%	6 / 21	▲3	2nd	Opposition
2019	Lennox Linton	16,424	40.99%	3 / 21	▼3	2nd	Opposition
2022	Thomson Fontaine	Boycotted					Extra-parliamentary
