= Dominica Labour Party =

Dominican political party (founded 1955)

- Leader: Roosevelt Skerrit
- Founded: 1955; 71 years ago
- Ideology: Social democracy Labourism
- Political position: Centre-left
- International affiliation: COPPPAL
- House of Assembly: 19 / 32

Website
- dominicalabourparty.com

The Dominica Labour Party (DLP) is a centre-left and social-democratic political party in Dominica.

== History ==
Founded in 1955 by Phyllis Shand Allfrey and Emmanuel Christopher Loblack, the Dominica Labour Party (DLP) is the oldest political party in Dominica. The DLP first contested general elections in 1961, winning seven of the 11 seats, and party leader Edward Leblanc became Premier of Dominica. In the next elections in 1966, the DLP won all but one of the seats. The party split and former leader Leblanc won the 1970 elections under the banner of Leblanc Labour Party. Leblanc retired in 1974, and he was succeeded by Patrick John. The DLP achieved a fourth consecutive victory in the 1975 elections, when the party won 16 of the 21 seats. John was ousted as Prime Minister in summer 1979.

In 1980, the party led by John suffered a major defeat, seeing its vote share reduced from 50% to 17%, and losing all its seats as the Dominica Freedom Party (DFP) won the elections. In 1983, Oliver Seraphin was elected party leader, with Patrick John as his deputy.

The United Dominica Labour Party led by Michael Douglas merged back to Labour Party in 1985, and Douglas was elected leader, with Seraphin as his deputy. The party regained five seats in the 1985 elections, losing one in 1990 and gaining one in 1995.

In the 2000 elections, the party regained power for the first time since 1975, winning 10 of the 21 seats and forming a coalition with the DFP, after which Roosevelt "Rosie" Douglas became prime minister. However, on 1 October 2000, Douglas died suddenly, after only a few months in office, and he was replaced by Pierre Charles. On 6 January 2004, Charles, who had been suffering from heart problems since 2003, also died. After the death of Pierre Charles, Foreign Minister Osborne Riviere acted as prime minister, until Education Minister Roosevelt Skerrit was named political leader of the party and was sworn in as prime minister.

Under the leadership of Roosevelt Skerrit, the party won 12 seats in the 2005 elections and remained in office. In the 2009 general elections, the Dominica Labour Party scored a third consecutive victory, winning 18 of the 21 seats, despite the opposition's claims of campaign improprieties.

== Leadership ==
- Edward Oliver LeBlanc, 1961–1970
- Nicholson Ducreay, 1970
- Edward Oliver LeBlanc, 1970–1974
- Patrick John, 1974–1983
- Oliver Seraphin, 1983–1985
- Michael Douglas, 1985–1992
- Rosie Douglas, 1992–2000
- Pierre Charles, 2000–2004
- Roosevelt Skerrit, since 2004

== Electoral history ==
=== House of Assembly elections ===
Election	Party leader	Votes	%	Seats	+/–	Position	Result
1961	Edward Oliver LeBlanc	7,848	47.5%	7 / 11	▲7	▲1st	Majority government
1966	Edward Oliver LeBlanc	11,735	65.0%	10 / 11	▲3	1st	Supermajority government
1970	Edward Oliver LeBlanc	9,877	49.9%	8 / 11	▼2	1st	Supermajority government
1975	Patrick John	10,523	49.3%	16 / 21	▲8	1st	Supermajority government
1980	Patrick John	5,326	16.8%	0 / 21	▼16	▼3rd	Extra-parliamentary
1985	Michael Douglas	13,014	39.1%	5 / 21	▲5	▲2nd	Opposition
1990	Michael Douglas	7,860	23.5%	4 / 21	▼1	▼3rd	Opposition
1995	Rosie Douglas	11,064	29.8%	5 / 21	▲1	▲2nd	Opposition
2000	Rosie Douglas	15,362	42.9%	10 / 21	▲5	▲1st	DLP–DFP coalition government
2005	Roosevelt Skerrit	19,741	52.07%	12 / 21	▲2	1st	Majority government
2009	Roosevelt Skerrit	22,262	61.34%	18 / 21	▲6	1st	Supermajority government
2014	Roosevelt Skerrit	23,208	56.99%	15 / 21	▼3	1st	Supermajority government
2019	Roosevelt Skerrit	23,643	59.01%	18 / 21	▲3	1st	Supermajority government
2022	Roosevelt Skerrit	15,214	82.38%	19 / 21	▲1	1st	Supermajority government
