= List of settlements in Dominica =

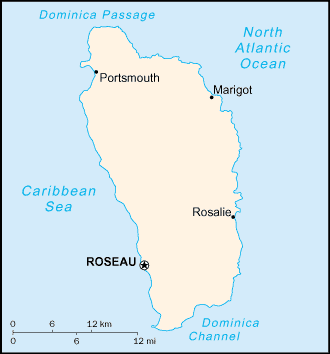

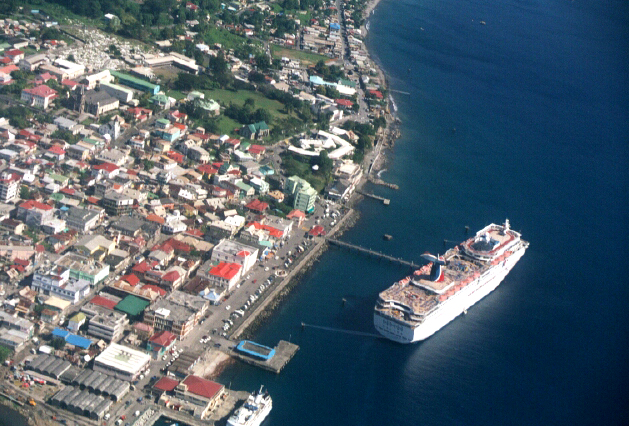
Roseau, Capital of Dominica

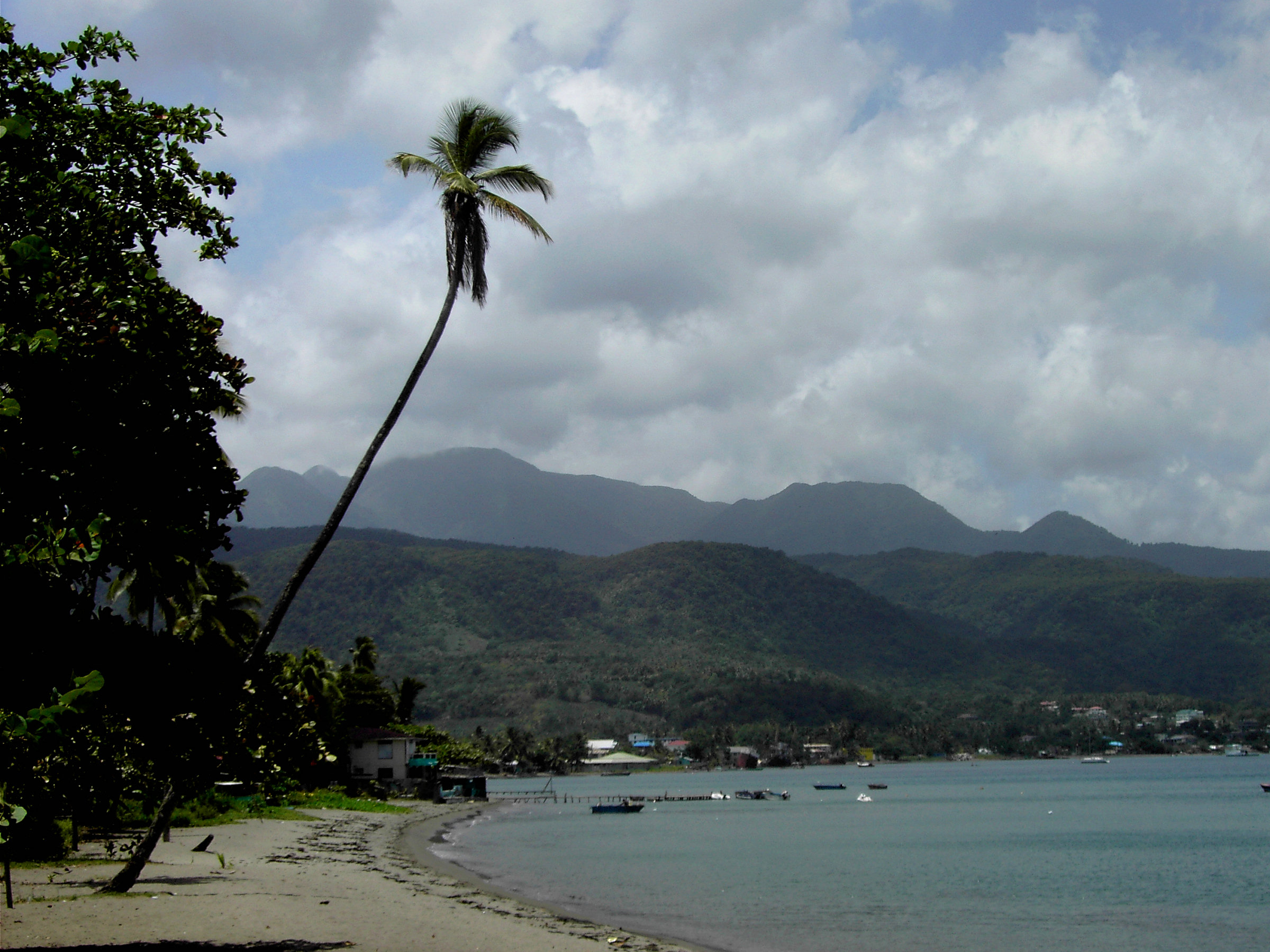
Portsmouth

This is a list of settlements in the Commonwealth of Dominica.

For the purposes of local government, Dominica has thirty-seven active village districts, one town, one urban district, one city, and the Kalinago Territory. Elections are held regularly, and collectively they are officially termed "local authorities". Within this categorisation, towns, urban districts, and cities are called municipal councils. Local authorities cooperate in district council associations, although district councils are voluntary and are not an official form of administrative division.

== List of settlements ==
=== Larger settlements (750+) ===
- Atkinson
- Barroui (Salisbury)
- Calibishie
- Canefield
- Castle Bruce
- Grand Bay (Berekua)
- La Plaine
- Mahaut
- Marigot
- Pointe Michel
- Portsmouth (Grand-Anse)
- Rosalie
- Roseau (Capital)
- Saint Joseph
- Salisbury (Barroui)
- Soufrière
- Wesley (La Soie)
- Woodford Hill

=== Smaller settlements (0–749) ===
- Anse du Mé
- Bagatelle
- Bataka
- Belles
- Bellevue Chopin
- Bense
- Bioche
- Boetica
- Bornes
- Campbell
- Capucin
- Clifton
- Colihaut
- Cottage
- Coulibistrie
- Delices
- Dublanc
- Dubuc
- Eggleston
- Fond Cani
- Fond St. Jean
- Galion
- Giraudel
- Good Hope
- Goodwill
- Grandbay
- Grand Fond
- Laudat
- Layou
- Loubiere
- Massacre
- Mahaut
- Mero
- Morne Daniel
- Morne Prosper
- Paix Bouche
- Penville
- Petite Savanne
- Petit Soufrière
- Pichelin
- San Sauveur
- Salybia
- Scotts Head
- Stock Farm
- Stowe
- Tanetane
- Tarou
- Thibaud
- Toucari
- Trafalgar
- Vieille Case
- Warner
- Wotten Waven

== List of local authorities ==
Name	Type	Council chairperson
Atkinson	Village district	Anton Laville
Kalinago Territory	Territory	Garnet Joseph
Castle Bruce	Village district	Johnson Drigo
Good Hope	Village district	Pierre Labassiere
Petite Soufrière–San Sauveur	Village district	Julia Winston
Bense–Anse De Mai–Anse Soldat	Village district	Isaiah Theodore
Clifton–Capuchin–Cocoyer	Village district	Mary Seaman
Paix Bouche–Belle Manière	Village district	Fellina George
Penville	Village district	Gabriel LeBlanc
Portsmouth	Town	Errol Hill
Tan Tan–Toucarie–Cottage	Village district	Vernon Jno Baptiste
Thibaud	Village district	Mary Sambar Bruney
Vieille Case	Village district	Stella Skerrit LeBlanc
Calibishie	Village district	Angelo Joseph
Marigot	Village district	James Alfred Greer
Wesley	Village district	Julien Jeremy
Woodford Hill	Village district	Scribner Bazil
Bagatelle–Fond St. Jean–Pointe Caribe	Village district	Marcus Thomas
Bellevue Chopin	Village district	Cecil Shillingford
Grand Bay	Village district	Willie Fevrier
Petite Savanne	Village district	Glender Hilaire
Pichelin	Village district	Thomas Letang
Tete Morne	Village district	Sharmaine Dickson
Boetica	Village district	Jenner Guiste
Delices–Carib–La Roche–Victoria	Village district	Delwin James
Grand Fond	Village district	Julius Carbon
La Plaine–La Ronde	Village district	Davis Thomas
Morne Jaune–Riviere Cyrique	Village district	Sylvester Samuel
Giraudel–Eggleston	Village district	Nathaniel Alexander
Loubiere–Madrelle–Fond Baron	Village district	Rosemund Lebruin
Morne Prosper	Village district	Mc Dowill Paul
Pointe Michel	Village district	Gustave Williams
Roseau	City	Cecil A. Joseph
Soufrière–Scotts Head–Gallion	Village district	Celia Williams
Trafalgar–Shawford–Fond Canie	Village district	–
Campbell–Despor	Village district	Wynard Esprit
Canefield	Urban district	Simeon Albert
Colihaut	Village district	Arthur Knight
Coulibistrie–Morne Rachette	Village district	Marilyn Pascal
Dublanc–Bioche	Village district	Curtis Francois
Mahaut–Jimmit–Tareau	Village district	Neil Lenin Esprit
Saint Joseph	Village district	Ken George
