= Paix Bouche (Dominica constituency) =

Electoral district of Dominica

- Constituency for the House of Assembly of Dominica
- Electorate: 2,738 (2019)

Current constituency
- Party: Dominica Labour Party
- Representative: Lakeyia Joseph

Paix Bouche is one of the 21 electoral districts of the House of Assembly of Dominica. It contains the areas of Anse du Mé, Calibishie, Hampstead, and Paix Bouche. It is currently represented by Dominica Labour Party MP Lakeyia Joseph.

== Electorate ==
The following is a list of the number of eligible voters in the Paix Bouche constituency at the time of each election provided by the Electoral Office of Dominica.

Year	Electorate	Notes
1975	932	
1980	1,116	
1985	1,386	
1990	2,090	
1995	2,353	
2000	2,436	
2005	2,605	
2014	2,719	
2019	2,738	

== List of representatives ==
Election	Years	Member	Party (Note: Indicates party the MP was running with during their election.)	Notes
1975	1975 – 1980	Randolph Bannis	DLP	
1980	1980 – 1985	Jenner Armour	Independent	
1985	1985 – 1990	Rosie Douglas	UDLP	
1990	1990 – 1995	Jenner Armour	DFP	
1995	1990 – 2014	Matthew J. Walter	DLP	
2014	2014 – 2022	Roselyn Paul	DLP	
2022	2022 –	Lakeyia Joseph	DLP	

== Electoral history ==
The following is a list of election results from the Electoral Office of Dominica. The election results lack spoiled and rejected ballots.

2009 Paix Bouche general election
Candidate	Party	Votes	%
Matthew J. Walter	Dominica Labour Party	1,157	88.46
John Bruno	United Workers' Party	151	11.54
Total		1,308	100.00
DLP hold			

2014 Paix Bouche general election
Candidate	Party	Votes	%
Roselyn Paul	Dominica Labour Party	1,212	80.32
Eunica Anthony Victor	United Workers' Party	297	19.68
Total		1,509	100.00
DLP hold			

2019 Paix Bouche general election
Candidate	Party	Votes	%
Roselyn Paul	Dominica Labour Party	1,138	84.93
Davis George	United Workers' Party	202	15.07
Total		1,340	100.00
DLP hold			

2022 Paix Bouche general election (Note: Elected unopposed.)
Candidate	Party	Votes	%
Lakeyia Joseph	Dominica Labour Party	0	–
Total		0	–
DLP hold			
