= Castle Bruce (Dominica constituency) =

Constituency of the House of Assembly of Dominica

- Constituency for the House of Assembly of Dominica
- Electorate: 2,903 (2022)

Current constituency
- Created: 1975
- Number of members: 1
- Representative: Octavia Alfred (DLP)

Castle Bruce is a parliamentary electoral district in Dominica. It includes the areas of Castle Bruce, Good Hope, Petite Soufrière, and San Sauveur. It came into effect in time for the 1975 Dominican general election. It has been represented by Octavia Alfred of the Dominica Labour Party since the 2019 general election.

== Constituency profile ==
The constituency was created for the 1975 Dominican general election. It includes the areas of Castle Bruce, Good Hope, Petite Soufrière, and San Sauveur. It had an electorate of 2,850 as of November 2016. It extends from the eastern boundary of Saint Joseph Parish to the north, along the Madjini River to the Atlantic Ocean on the east, from the Rosalie River on the south until the intersection of the Pont Casse-Rosalie and Castle Bruce roads on the west.

== Electorate ==
The following is a list of the number of eligible voters in the Castle Bruce constituency at the time of each election provided by the Electoral Office of Dominica.

Year	Electorate	Notes
1975	1,233	
1980	1,629	
1985	1,836	
1990	1,993	
1995	2,352	
2000	2,424	
2005	2,664	
2014	2,940	
2019	2,927	
2022	2,903	

== List of representatives ==
This constituency has elected the following members of the House of Assembly of Dominica:

Election	Years	Member	Party (Note: Indicates party the MP was running with during their election.)	Notes
1975	24 March 1975–21 July 1980	Romanus Bannis	DLP	
1980	21 July 1980–1 July 1985	Oliver A. Sanderson	DFP	
1985	1 July 1985–28 May 1990	Eden Durand	DLP	
1990	28 May 1990–31 January 2000	Romanus Bannis	UWP	
2000	31 January 2000–18 December 2009	Loreen Bannis-Roberts	UWP	
2009	18 December 2009–6 December 2019	Johnson Drigo	DLP	
2019	6 December 2019–Present	Octavia Alfred	DLP	

== Election results ==
=== Elections in the 2010s ===
2019 general election: Castle Bruce
Party	Candidate	Votes	%	±%
DLP	Octavia Alfred	842	51.03	
UWP	Ernie Lawrence Jno Finn	808	48.97	
Majority		34	2.06	
Turnout		1,650		
DLP hold		Swing		

2014 general election: Castle Bruce
Party	Candidate	Votes	%	±%
DLP	Johnson Drigo	944	54.57	
UWP	Isaac Baptiste	786	45.43	
Majority		158	9.13	
Turnout		1,730	59.46	
DLP hold		Swing		
