= Saint David Parish, Dominica =

Saint David
- Parish
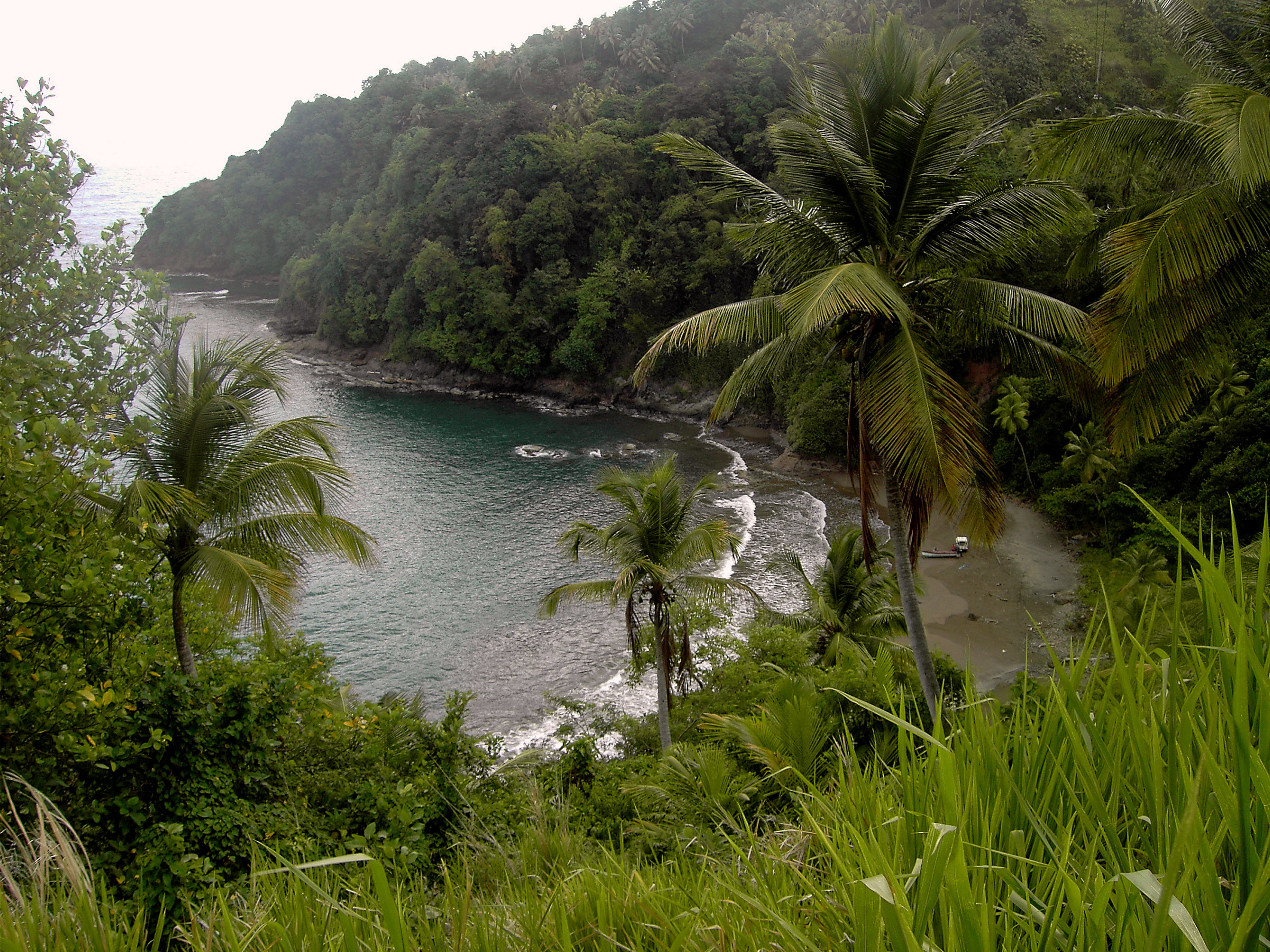
- Carib Territory coast

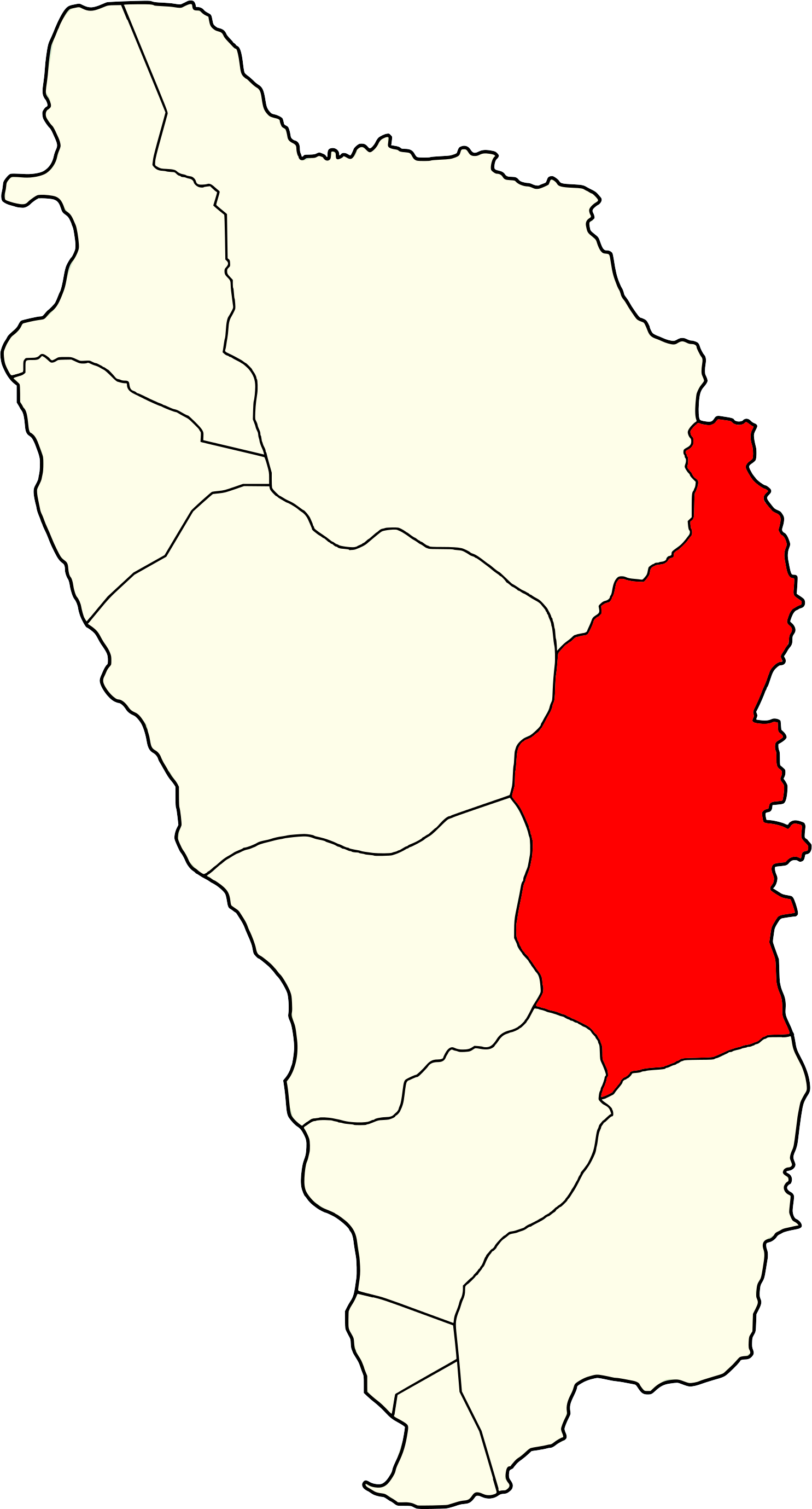
- Country: Dominica
- Capital: Castle Bruce

Area
  - Total: 131.5 km^{2} (50.8 sq mi)

Population (2011)
  - Total: 6,043
  - Density: 45.95/km^{2} (119.0/sq mi)
- Time zone: UTC-4
- ISO 3166-2: DM-03

Saint David is one of Dominica's ten administrative parishes, located on the eastern side of the island. It is bordered by St. Andrew to the north; St. Joseph, St. Paul and St. George to the west; and St. Patrick to the south. With that, it's bordered by five other parishes, more than any other one in Dominica. It has an area of 131.6 km^{2} (50.8 mi^{2}), and has a population of 6,789.

== Settlements ==
Its largest settlement is Castle Bruce, with a population of 1,653. It includes the Indigenous community of the Kalinago Territory (formerly the Carib Territory) which has a population of about 3000 spread across 7 hamlets. Other villages include:

- Grand Fond
- Rosalie
- Good Hope
- Petit Soufrière
- Riviere Cyrique
- Morne Jaune
- San Sauveur
- Kalinago Territory
- Atkinson
- Antrizle

== Areas of interest ==
The northern area of the parish is also home to the island's Kalinago Territory, in and around which 3,000 pure, indigenous Kalinago live.
