= Hill River =

Hill River may refer to:

- Hill River (Western Australia), river and town
- Hill River (Lost River), a river in Minnesota
- Hill River (Willow River), a river in Minnesota
- Hill River State Forest, a state forest in Minnesota
- Hill River, South Australia, a locality
- Hill River (South Australia), a river
- Hill River Township, Minnesota, town

== See also ==
- Eagle Hill River
- Little Hill River
- Polish Hill River
- Red Hill River
- Sand Hill River
- Smoky Hill River
- Woodford Hill River
- North Fork Smoky Hill River
