= L'anse Noire, Dominica =

L'anse Noire is a complete cove located on the North East coast in Saint Andrew, Dominica. It is situated between Hodges Estate and Woodford Hill and is one of the only black, sand beaches on this coast. The estimate terrain elevation above sea level is 38 metres.
