= Thibaud, Dominica =

Village in Dominica

Coordinates: 15°36′N 61°24′W

- Village
- Interactive map of Thibaud, Dominica
- Country: Dominica,

Thibaud is a village on the northern coast of Dominica, part of Saint Andrew Parish. It has a population of approximately 500. Located near Vieille Case, Thibaud's main industries are fishing and farming.

Thibaud appears on the earliest detailed map of the island by Thomas Jefferys in 1768. It was named after an early French settler, Louis Thibaud, (spelled in the early British texts as Teaubaud) who obtained ten acres from the Kalinago in the early 18th century.

Thibaud is connected to two bays. Sandwich Bay, is named after John Montagu, 4th Earl of Sandwich (1718-1792). The other bay is the beach place for the village fishing boats. The school playing field was the site of an Amerindian village. During the period after the abolition of slavery in Domenica, Thibaud grew as former laborers from the estates of Moor Park and Blenheim settled there.
