= Petit Soufrière, Dominica =

Coordinates: 15.391169°N 61.25542°W

Petit Soufrière is a small village on the east coast of Dominica, upland from Petite Soufrière Bay in Saint David Parish. Located on the steep, rugged slopes of Morne Aux Delices at the end of the main road south from Castle Bruce, it is one of the most isolated villages in Dominica. The village immediately to its north is Saint Sauveur; to its south, though connected only by a hiking trail, is Rosalie.

Historically, Petit Soufrière had never been part of a large estate because of the rough terrain, and instead developed as a peasant farming settlement. Today, it remains a small, rural community of farmers.
