= Jerelle Joseph =

Chemist from Dominica

Jerelle A. Joseph is a computational chemist and academic from Dominica, who is also an advocate for representation and diversity in science. She is the founder of CariScholar, a network connecting students and academics from Caribbean countries.

== Biography ==
Joseph grew up in the village of Vieille Case in Dominica. Her mother was a nurse and her father worked a variety of jobs. She graduated in 2012 with a BSc in Chemistry and mathematics from the University of the West Indies. This was followed by an MPhil in Chemistry at the same institution, graduating in 2014. She subsequently graduated with a DPhil in Chemistry from the University of Cambridge in 2018. She subsequently continued her work at Cambridge in a post-doctoral role in the team of Rosana Collepardo-Guevara. In January 2023 she was appointed Assistant Professor of Chemical and Biological Engineering at Princeton University. She works on the development of computational approaches to determine cellular organisation, in particular liquid–liquid phase separation.

Joseph is the founder of CariScholar, an organisation designed to connect students and academics from the Caribbean for mentoring. Mentors include pscyhopharmocologist Kito Barrow, physician Mondel George, engineer Asher Williams, machine learning scientist Randall Martyr, amongst others.

== Awards ==
- Outstanding Youth in Diaspora Award – National Youth Council Dominica (2022)
- Rising Star in Soft and Biological Matter – University of Chicago (2020)
- Bill Gates Sr Award – Gates Cambridge Trust (2018)
- Gates Cambridge Scholarship – Gates Cambridge Trust (2014)
- R. L. Seale Chemistry Prize – University of the West Indies (2012)
- Faculty of Arts and Science Scholarship – Government of Dominica (2009)

== Publications ==
- Joseph, J. A., Espinosa, J. R., Sanchez-Burgos, I., Garaizar, A., Frenkel, D., & Collepardo-Guevara, R. (2021). Thermodynamics and kinetics of phase separation of protein-RNA mixtures by a minimal model. Biophysical Journal, 120(7), 1219-1230.
- Joseph, J. A., Reinhardt, A., Aguirre, A., Chew, P. Y., Russell, K. O., Espinosa, J. R., ... & Collepardo-Guevara, R. (2021). Physics-driven coarse-grained model for biomolecular phase separation with near-quantitative accuracy. Nature Computational Science, 1(11), 732-743.
- Krainer, G., Welsh, T. J., Joseph, J. A., Espinosa, J. R., Wittmann, S., de Csilléry, E., ... & Knowles, T. P. (2021). Reentrant liquid condensate phase of proteins is stabilized by hydrophobic and non-ionic interactions. Nature communications, 12(1), 1-14.
- Espinosa, J. R., Joseph, J. A., Sanchez-Burgos, I., Garaizar, A., Frenkel, D., & Collepardo-Guevara, R. (2020). Liquid network connectivity regulates the stability and composition of biomolecular condensates with many components. Proceedings of the National Academy of Sciences, 117(24), 13238-13247.
- Sanchez-Burgos, I., Espinosa, J. R., Joseph, J. A., & Collepardo-Guevara, R. (2021). Valency and binding affinity variations can regulate the multilayered organization of protein condensates with many components. Biomolecules, 11(2), 278.
