= Roselyn Paul =

Dominican politician

Minister of Sports
- In office 17 December 2019 – 13 December 2022
- Prime Minister: Roosevelt Skerrit

Member of Parliament for Paix Bouche
- In office 2014–2022
- Preceded by: Matthew J. Walter
- Succeeded by: Lakeyia Joseph

Personal details
- Party: Dominica Labour Party

Roselyn V. Paul is a Dominican politician from the Dominica Labour Party (DLP).

== Biography ==
Paul worked for 18 years as a primary school teacher at the Paix Bouche Primary School. Paul was elected on the DLP ticket in the 2014 general election to serve as in the House of Assembly representing the Paix Bouche constituency. She was re-elected in 2019. She did not run for re-election in 2022. Paul served as Minister for Culture and Community Development. She was also Minister for Commerce, Enterprise and Small Business Development. She is the mother of two daughters; Dr. Kyra Paul and Amatulia Lockhart.
