= Octavia Alfred =

Dominican politician

Honourable Octavia Alfred MP

Minister for Education, Human Resource Planning, Vocational Training and Nation Excellence
- Incumbent
- Assumed office 17 December 2019
- President: Charles Savarin; Sylvanie Burton

Member of Parliament for Castle Bruce
- Incumbent
- Assumed office 6 December 2019
- Preceded by: Johnson Drigo

Personal details
- Party: Dominica Labour Party

Octavia Alfred is a Dominican politician who serves as the current Minister for Education, Human Resource Planning, Vocational Training and Nation Excellence. Prior to entering parliament in 2019, she had worked as a teacher since 1985. In 2021, as Minister, Alfred supported efforts to maintain the use of Creole in Dominica.
