= Penville =

- Location in Dominica
- Coordinates: 15°37′45″N 61°25′10″W
- Country: Dominica
- Parish: Saint Andrew Parish

Population (2001)
  - Total: 524
- Time zone: UTC-4 (UTC)

Penville or Pennville is a village in Dominica's Saint Andrew Parish. The community is situated just north of Vieille Case, and has a population of 524.

Cold sulphur springs called Cold Soufrière are located near the village. There is a short trail from Penville-Portsmouth road to the springs.

Politician Roosevelt Skerrit is from Penville. He represents the Vieille Case constituency of which Pennville is part.

Pennville (E) A village at the extreme north end of Dominica situated along cliff tops overlooking the Atlantic Ocean and Guadeloupe Channel. The village is divided into Upper and Lower Pennville. Part of Upper Pennville is called Carib and was one of the last Carib villages. Many Pennville people are descendants of these Caribs who mixed with Africans and European settlers. After the British took over the island in 1763 the main purchasers in the area were Langford Lovel, James Morson and Duncan McIntosh, but the steep and isolated nature of the place caused them to abandon much of the lands to French smallholders prominent among whom was Jean Baptiste Demetre. His name survives in the Dimitre River which is the main stream serving Pennville. The Seaman family owned land around here also and were connected to the Harris family who owned Delaford Estate and who assisted with getting a road and school for the village
