= Loreen Ruth Bannis-Roberts =

Dominican politician

Loreen Ruth Bannis
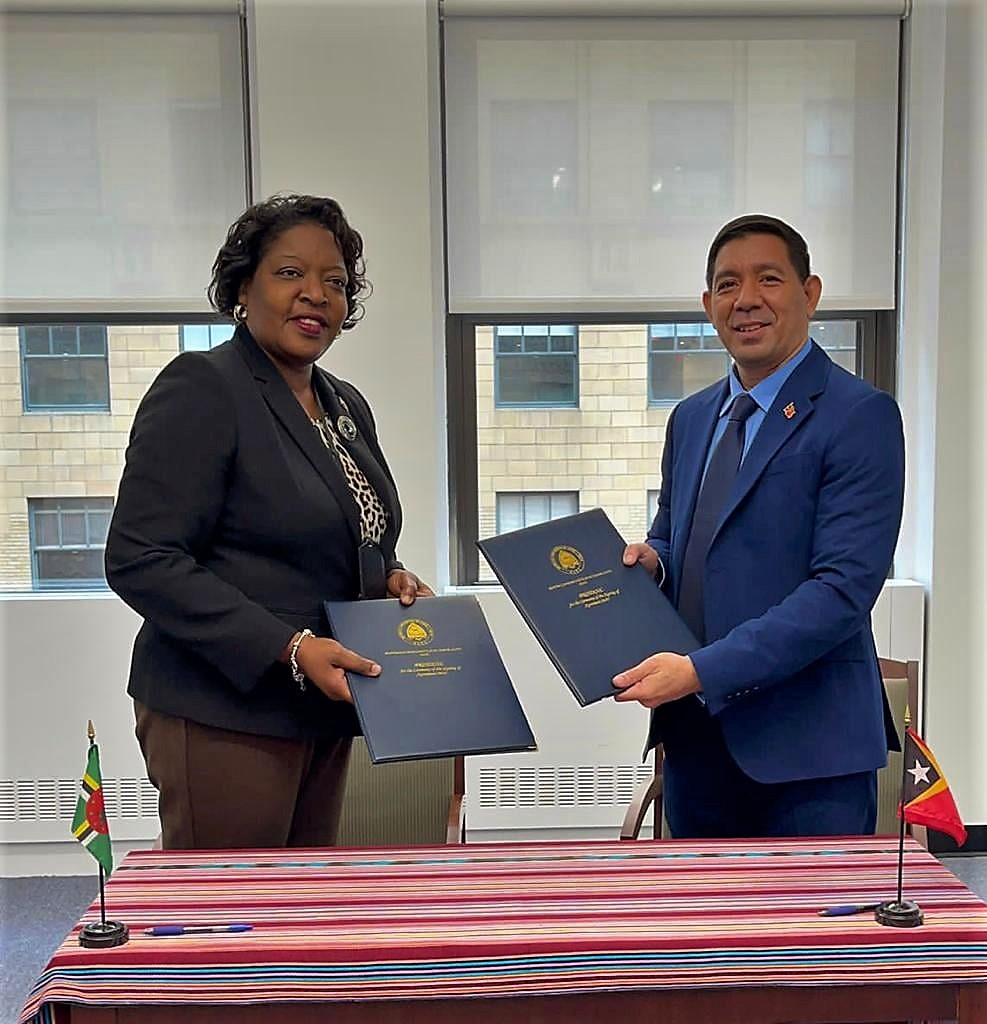
- Loreen Ruth Bannis-Roberts with Karlito Nunes, ambassador of East Timor (2021)
- Born: September 19, 1966 (age 59)

Loreen Ruth Bannis-Roberts (born 19 September 1966) is a politician, businesswoman and diplomat from the Commonwealth of Dominica. Since August 2016, she has been the Permanent Representative of Dominica to the United Nations, the first woman to hold the post. Representing the United Workers' Party, she was earlier Member of Parliament for the Castle Bruce constituency and has served in various ministerial positions in Dominica, including that of minister.

== Biography ==
Born on 19 September 1966 in the village of Castle Bruce, Loreen Ruth Bannis is the daughter of Ruthina and McDonald Bannis. After successfully completing her school education at Dominica's Convent High School, she studied at York University's Schulich School of Business in Toronto, Canada.

Before embarking on her political career, Bannis-Roberts worked as a schoolteacher and at the National Commercial Bank of Dominica. In 2000, as a member of the United Workers' Party, she was elected Parliamentary Representative of the Castle Bruce Constituency, a post she held until 2009. During this period, she served as Parliamentary Secretary in the Ministry of Education (2000–2005), Minister of State at the Ministry of Tourism, Industry and Private Sector Relations (2005–2007), and Minister for Community Development, Culture, Gender Affairs and Information (2007–2009). On two occasions, she also served as Acting Prime Minister.

In August 2016, she was appointed as the Permanent Representative of Dominica to the United Nations, becoming the first woman to hold the post. She succeeded Vince Henderson who had served as Dominica's Permanent Representative since March 2010.

Loreen Bannis-Roberts is married and has three children.

== Awards ==
In 2011, Bannis-Roberts received the Woman of Great Esteem Emerald Award for contributing to the development and advancement of her community without discrimination.
