= Anse du Mé =

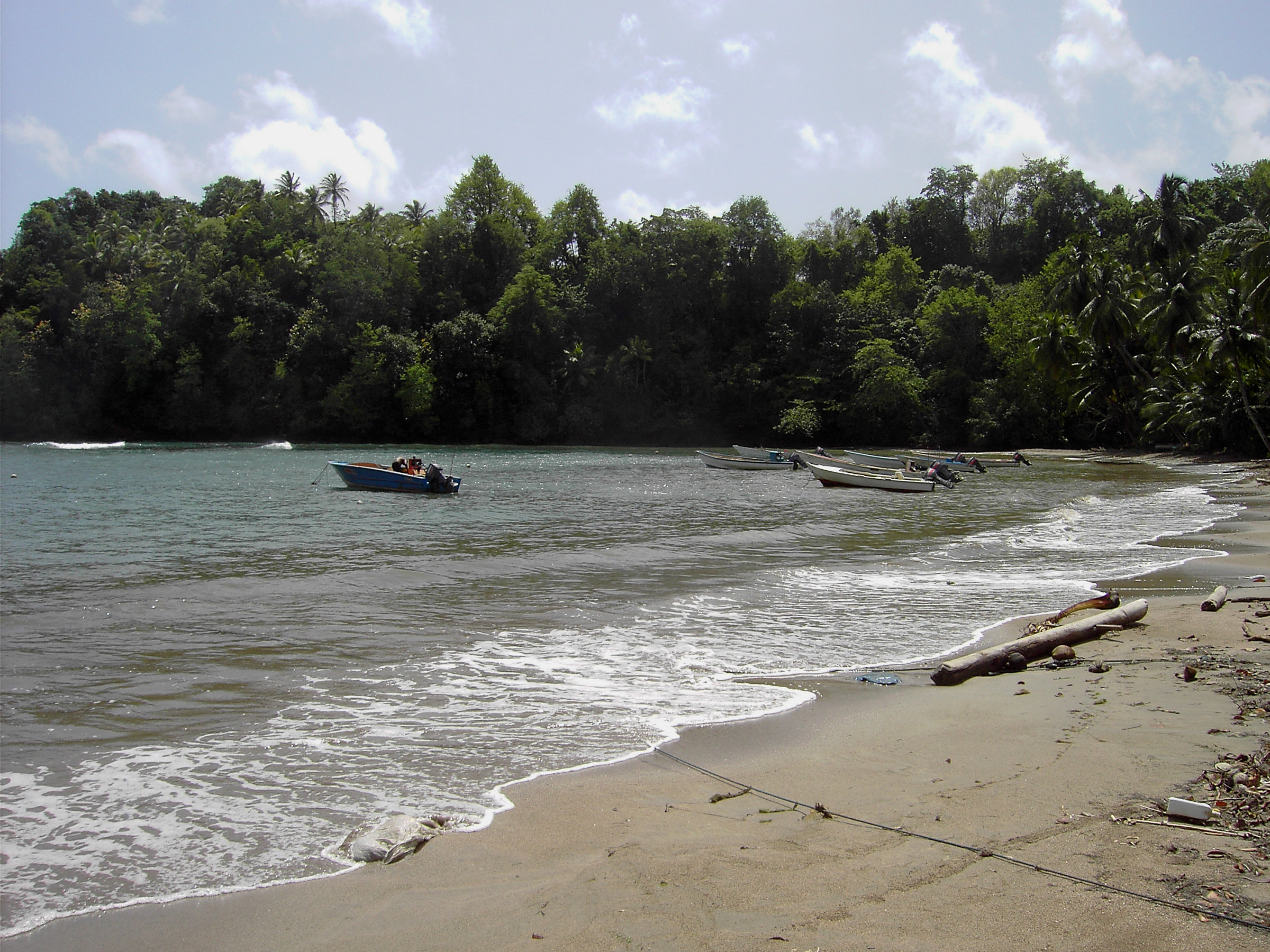

- Location in Dominica
- Coordinates: 15°35′N 61°22′W
- Country: Dominica
- Parish: Saint Andrew Parish
- Time zone: UTC-4 (UTC)

Anse de Mai is a fishing village in the northeast of Dominica, located between the towns of Calibishie and Portsmouth. In 2013 Atlantique View Resort & Spa opened in Anse de Mai.
