= Bense =

- Location in Dominica
- Coordinates: 15°35′N 61°22′W
- Country: Dominica
- Parish: Saint Andrew Parish
- Time zone: UTC-4 (GMT)

Bense is a village on the northern coast of Dominica which, together with the neighbouring village of Hampstead, Dominica, has a population of around 780 people. It comprises three hamlets, Bense, Anse de Mai, and Anse Soldat, which are together grouped under one village council. The village is served along with its neighbours, Hampstead and Calibishie, by member of parliament and Minister of Information, Community Development, and Gender Affairs, the Honourable Matthew Walter. Another notable Bense native is Minister of Health and Social Security the Honourable John Fabien.

== Bense ==
Bense is located at the top of a hill overlooking the sea. Its inhabitants are mostly farmers due to its close proximity to the highly arable land. It is here that the primary school, Seventh-day Adventist church, Baptist church, community resource centre, and community preschool are found. Village council meetings are also held here.

=== Bense Primary School ===
The primary school has approximately fifty students and holds classes for grades K-6. It serves Bense, Anse de Mai, and Anse Soldat. After graduating from the primary school, students must commute to Portsmouth for a secondary education.

=== Community preschool ===
The community preschool has approximately fifteen students and is funded by the students and administered by the village council.

=== Resource centre ===
The resource centre is home to the council office, the Credit Union, the Post Office, and the Lonia Thomas computer centre where residents can access the internet.

== Anse de Mai ==
Anse de Mai is a fishing hamlet located beside the sea. It has a small beach with a bay where the fishing boats are anchored. The main source of income for the residents of this hamlet is fishing. Also located here are the Catholic Church, the sports field, the community health clinic, and the Kubuli bar.

== Anse Sol dat ==
Anse Soldat is also a fishing community. It has its own sandy beach with a sheltered bay for the boats to be anchored. Its inhabitants are also mostly fishermen, but many of its residents are becoming involved in other professions. It is home to the Town Network Fire Domino Club.
