= Calibishie =

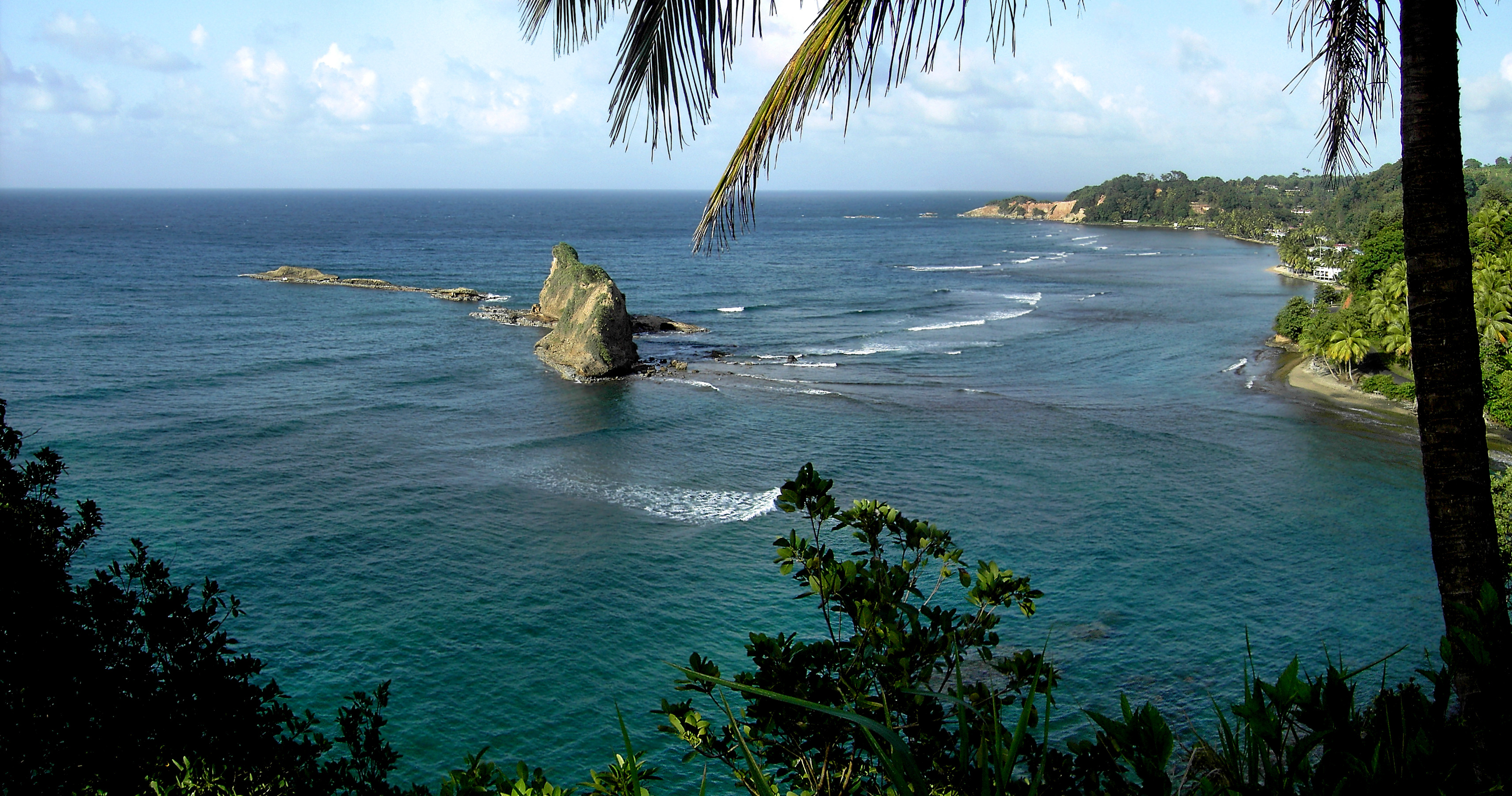

- Location in Dominica
- Coordinates: 15°35′N 61°21′W
- Country: Dominica
- Parish: Saint Andrew Parish
- Time zone: UTC-4 (UTC)

Calibishie is a village in Dominica, located on the north-east coast of the island, immediately to the east of the village of Hampstead. The Calibishie Coast Travel Area is thought by many to be the most scenic and unspoiled region of Dominica. The Calibishie coast is one of the few areas in the world where the distance from the seashore to rain forest is little more than a mile. Calibishie is home to Dominica's Batibou, Hampstead, Hodges, Point Baptiste, Turtle and Woodford Hill Beaches.

The area has palm-fringed beaches, freshwater rivers with secluded bathing pools, waterfalls and dense rain forest with exotic birds and lush vegetation. Tourist attractions include cycling, snorkelling and scuba diving.

A wide variety of accommodation is available along the coast. The local population is very friendly and quite a few small, local restaurants have begun to sprout up the meet the needs of growing tourism to the area.

== History ==
Calibishie gets its name from the native Arawakan language that was spoken by the island's first occupants, the Kalinagos, later renamed “Caribs” by European colonizers. In Arawakan, the word cali translates to “net,” and bishie is “reef,” thus Calibishie has been translated to mean "net of reefs". The Kalinagos utilized Calibishie's natural setting as it lies along the only barrier reef on the island. The location provided sustenance through fishing and agriculture, along with a forest above the village, which they used for wood materials, such as carved canoes.

With the advent of British and French occupation of the Americas, Calibishie along with the whole of the island changed dramatically. The British brought enslaved people from West Africa to work the estates of Hampstead and Hodges. In 1838, full emancipation was granted to Dominica's enslaved population. Calibishie subsequently became a fishing and farming community, and residents continue to work both of these industries in the village today. With the completion in 1956 of the Transinsular Road that links Marigot with the west coast via Pont Casse—the campaign for which was led by British Parliamentarian Elma Napier, who had settled in Calibishie—Calibishie's farmers could transport their products more easily to sell in Roseau. The second half of the twentieth century also brought roads connecting the villages on the north coast to Portsmouth, and in 1972, the road connecting Portsmouth and Roseau was completed. Roads benefited farmers in Calibishie; however, it has also been noted that the newly acquired accessibility drew people away from local farming ventures and into town. In recent years, Calibishie has also seen an influx of tourism from North America and Europe, and numerous guesthouses have been established to cater to these international visitors who venture to explore beyond the cruise ships of Roseau.

== Economy ==
Calibishie, like most of Dominica's villages, was traditionally a farming and fishing community. Even with the growth of tourism, commercial businesses, and civil service jobs in recent decades, farming continues to play an important role in the local economy of Calibishie. Since the 1992 discontinuation of preferential access of Dominican bananas to British markets, banana farmers in Calibishie have had to diversify their crops. While bananas are still the most commonly seen crop grown on the ridges above the village, Calibishie farmers market a wide range of local crops, which, in addition to bananas, include fruits such as plantains, pineapple, coconut, passion fruit, papaya; ground provisions such as cassava, dasheen, potato, yam; vegetables such as lettuce, cabbage, carrots, parsley, celery, pumpkin, breadfruit, and tomatoes. After several years without a local market, Calibishie village council chairman and farmer Froggy Peters re-launched the Saturday market in fall 2012, and the community has enjoyed the market's growing success in the subsequent months. Farmers yielding higher outputs sell their products to larger distributors in Roseau or neighbouring islands and international markets. Fishing, while not as common as farming, is still a source of income for some residents of Calibishie.

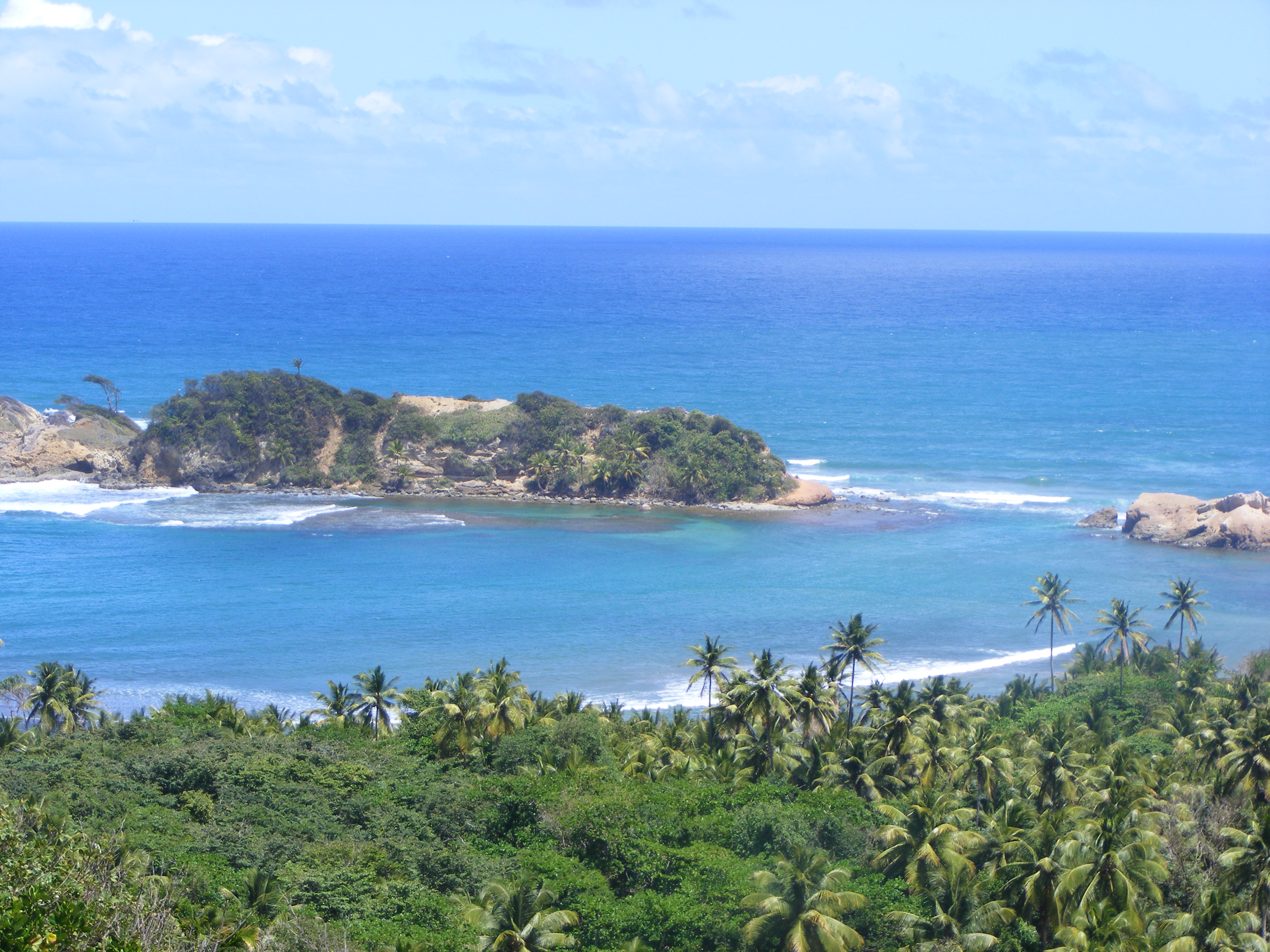
Calibishie coastline
