= Woodford Hill River =

River in Dominica

Coordinates: 15°35′N 61°19′W

The Woodford Hill River is a river located in the village of Woodford Hill on the Caribbean island of Dominica.

== See also ==
- List of rivers of Dominica
