= Woodford Hill, Dominica =

Woodford Hill
- Nickname: Simit
- Location in Dominica
- Coordinates: 15°34′N 61°19′W
- Country: Dominica
- Parish: Saint Andrew Parish

Population (2011)
  - Total: 1,034
- Time zone: UTC-4 (UTC)

Woodford Hill (15°34'59.99", -61°19'0.01") is a village in Saint Andrew Parish in north-eastern Dominica. Woodford Hill was an estate extending from Eden River to L’anse Noire. An Amerindian village existed at the mouth of the Woodford Hill river about 1,400 years ago. The present day village of Woodford Hill is on the western boundary of the old estate. It is made up of various sections including Small Farm, Mount Sylvie, Falang, Larieu, Fond Cole, Joe Road, and Big Cedar. According to the 2011 census report, Woodford Hill had a population of 1,034 (545 male and 489 female).

Kokoy is the main language spoken in the village, a dialect of Antiguan and Barbudan Creole brought to the village by Antiguan and Montserratian settlers.

== History ==
=== Colonial Origins and Early Ownership ===
When the French arrived to Dominica in the early 1700s they called the former Woodford Hill estate La Soie, after the Bois La Soie bush. The entire parish in which it is situated was called Quarte de La Soie. The area had gently sloping land and was one of the largest sugar producing estates on island. The area was put up for sale by the crown when the British occupied Dominica in 1763. A significant portion was bought by Napleton Smith. As a result, the present Kokoy name for the village of Woodford Hill is Simit (the ‘cockoy’, or English Creole pronunciation of Smith), in reference to the estate owner.

=== The Plantation Economy and Emancipation ===
Robert Aberdein was the owner of the Woodford Hill Estate until around 1826. After that point Faur Mourillon was a joint owner with F.V. Mourillon until their last known association in 1832. During the mid 19th century, the estate was owned by Charles Leatham who was nicknamed the “sugar king of Dominica”. Following emancipation, British slave owners received monetary compensation based on the classification of the individual and level of productivity of the territory. John Constable, a London West India Merchant, was the awardee of £2875 19s 7d in compensation for the 146 enslaved people of Woodford Hill Estate. This is equivalent to approximately £2.3–£2.8 million today when measured against relative income (average earnings). Five years before the emancipation of the British West Indies, 112 enslaved people worked in Woodford Hill, producing 66,000 lbs of sugar, 2,550 gallons of rum and 400 gallons of molasses. The ruins of the sugar plantation can still be seen by the seashore. The post-emancipation village of Woodford Hill developed on hilly land between the former Woodford Hill Estate and Hodges.

The emancipation of the British West Indies and the abolition of the slave trade did not bring the illicit trafficking of human beings to an immediate end. Certain traders continued to supply enslaved people to markets in Brazil, Cuba, and the United States. To combat this, the Royal Navy was tasked with intercepting slave ships and liberating those on board. In 1837, Dominica witnessed an unexpected arrival when the Royal Navy frigate HMS Griffin intercepted the Portuguese vessel Don Francisco several miles off the island’s coast. The ship had set out illegally from Ouidah, in present-day Benin, carrying 437 enslaved Africans destined for Cuba. It was brought to Roseau, and the people were freed. The liberated Africans were subsequently settled across the island, in communities including Woodford Hill. Many retained their African surnames while a number of those who settled around Woodford Hill came to bear the surname Africa.

=== Ownership in the Late 19th and Early 20th Centuries ===
At the end of the 19th century Woodford Hill was 1,123 acres large and the estate was bought by Estates Investment Trust of Dominica who owned it until they sold it to Captain William James Ross Stebbings in the 1930s. Stebbings was appointed by the King to be an unofficial member of the Executive Council of the Presidency of Dominica in 1934.

=== The Woodford Hill Bay Dispute ===
In June 1937, Stebbings notably gave notice to fishermen who had boats beached at Woodford Hill and Cariboa Bays to remove the boats and announced that in the future he would not allow anyone to use these Bays without special permission. He followed this by instituting proceedings against two fishermen and obtaining severe fines and costs against each of them. In response to the fines, the villagers of Woodford Hill and Wesley approached Mr. Lennox Pelham Napier, the elected member of the Legislative Council for their district and husband to Elma Napier, and asked him to prepare a petition to the Government to restore their right to use the area. Napier prepared the petition which was signed by an overwhelming majority of the people of Woodford Hill and Wesley. Before the petition was read at Council, Stebbings approached Mr. Napier and suggested a compromise resolution, which he accepted. In 1938, Captain Stebbings consented to allow a small strip of Woodford Hill beach to the Northern side of the bay to be used by the public. He also agreed to allow the villagers the right to wash their clothes at the mouth of the Woodford Hill river. At the time, he refused to compromise on Cariboa.

=== Mid-20th Century Ownership and Agricultural Development ===
The estate was then acquired by Frobel Laville in the 1940s who sold it to Ernest J. Foley and Geoffrey B. Band in 1948 who established Antilles Products Limited. They owned it until Geest Banana Company, founded by Dutch brothers John and Leonard van Geest, purchased the estate in 1954.

=== Government Acquisition and Land Distribution ===
In 1974, the Dominica Labour Party government, under the leadership of Patrick John, acquired 400 acres of the estate along the coast from Geest Industries and other landowners for the building of an airport and other projects. These projects were supposed to be developed under an agreement with Barbadian weapons smuggler Sydney Burnett-Alleyne. Mass protests led to the resignation of Patrick John and the planned projects were not forthcoming. In the late 1970s and 1980s Geest divided the rest of the estate into farm lots and they were sold mainly to villagers of the northeast.
