= Elma Napier =

Scottish-born Dominican writer and politician

- Born: Elma Gordon-Cumming; 23 March 1892; Scotland
- Died: 12 November 1973 (aged 81); Calibishie, Dominica
- Other names: Elma Gibbs; Elizabeth Garner
- Occupations: Writer, politician
- Spouse(s): Maurice Antony Crutchley Gibbs, m. 1912 (div.); Lennox Pelham Napier, m. 1924–1940, his death
- Children: 4
- Father: Sir William Gordon-Cumming
- Relatives: Lennox Honychurch (grandson)

Elma Napier (née Gordon-Cumming; 23 March 1892 – 12 November 1973), also known as Elma Gibbs and by the pen-name Elizabeth Garner, was a Scottish-born writer and politician who lived most of her life in the Caribbean island of Dominica. She published several novels and memoirs based on her life, and was the first woman elected to the legislature in Dominica.

== Early life ==
Elma Gordon-Cumming was born in Scotland as the eldest of five siblings born to Sir William Gordon-Cumming, a Lieutenant-Colonel in the 4th Battalion, The Scots Guards (1848–1930), and his wife, Florence Josephine Gordon-Cumming (née Garner; 1870–1922), an heiress whose own fortunes would slump during the marriage. Elma's father was a landowner, soldier, adventurer and socialite.

Elma's siblings were:

- Major Sir Alexander Penrose, MC, 5th Bt. (1893–1939)
- Roualeyn (1895–1928)
- Michael Willoughby (1901–1982)
- Cicely (1904–1970)

Elma later adopted her mother's maiden name as a pen name. Her army officer father's reputation had been ruined shortly before her birth in what became known as the Royal Baccarat Scandal. In 1891, he was accused of cheating in a game of baccarat with the Prince of Wales (later King Edward VII). Sir William sued for defamation and lost.

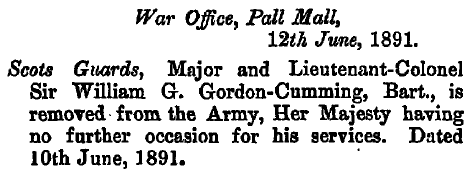
Sir William Gordon-Cumming's dismissal notice in The London Gazette, June 1891

As a result of the scandal, Gordon-Cumming was dismissed from the army the day after the trial. Elma came to understand that she was expected to rehabilitate the family by entering a good marriage. In 1912, she married Captain Maurice Antony Crutchley Gibbs (1888–1974), a businessman, with whom she had two children, Ronald and Daphne. The couple moved to Australia, where they lived for nine years until Elma met and fell in love with another English businessman, Lennox Pelham Napier (1891–1940). Elma divorced Gibbs, losing custody of her children in the process. Elma and Lennox married in 1924, and had two more children, Patricia and Michael. The couple remained wed until Lennox's death in 1940.

== Life in Dominica ==
The Napiers first visited Dominica, then a British colony, while on a Caribbean cruise in 1931. They moved there the following year, settling near the village of Calibishie at a house they built and named Pointe Baptiste. Her daughter by her first husband, Daphne, now 20, also came to live with them. Lennox died in 1940. Elma was first elected to the colony's Legislative Council that year, where she championed local government and development in the form of village boards and cooperative ventures. She became involved in local conservation efforts to preserve Dominica's forests. Elma remained at Pointe Baptiste, entertaining guests who included Somerset Maugham, Noël Coward, Patrick Leigh Fermor, and Princess Margaret.

== Writing ==
Napier wrote two novels, both set in Dominica, that were published in the 1930s. She wrote three memoirs, each covering a different stage of her life. Youth is a Blunder dealt with her youth, while Winter Is In July was mostly about her life in Australia. Black and White Sands, about her life in Dominica, was written in 1962 but first published in 2009. She periodically wrote articles for The Manchester Guardian.

== Death and legacy ==
Napier died at Calibishie, Dominica, on 12 November 1973, aged 81. She was buried, alongside her husband, near Pointe Baptiste. She was posthumously honoured by Dominica (which became independent in 1978) with a postage stamp bearing her portrait. Her grandson, Lennox Honychurch, is a Dominican historian and former politician.

== Works ==
=== Nonfiction ===
- Nothing So Blue (1927)
- Youth is a Blunder (1948)
- Winter Is In July (1949)
- Black and White Sands (written 1962; first published by Papillote Press, 2009, ISBN 978-0-9532224-4-5)
- Carnival in Martinique (1951)

=== Novels ===
- Duet in Discord (1936)
- A Flying Fish Whispered (1938; first published by Peepal Tree Press, 2011, ISBN 978-1-84523-102-6)
