= Saint Andrew Parish, Dominica =

Saint Andrew
- Parish
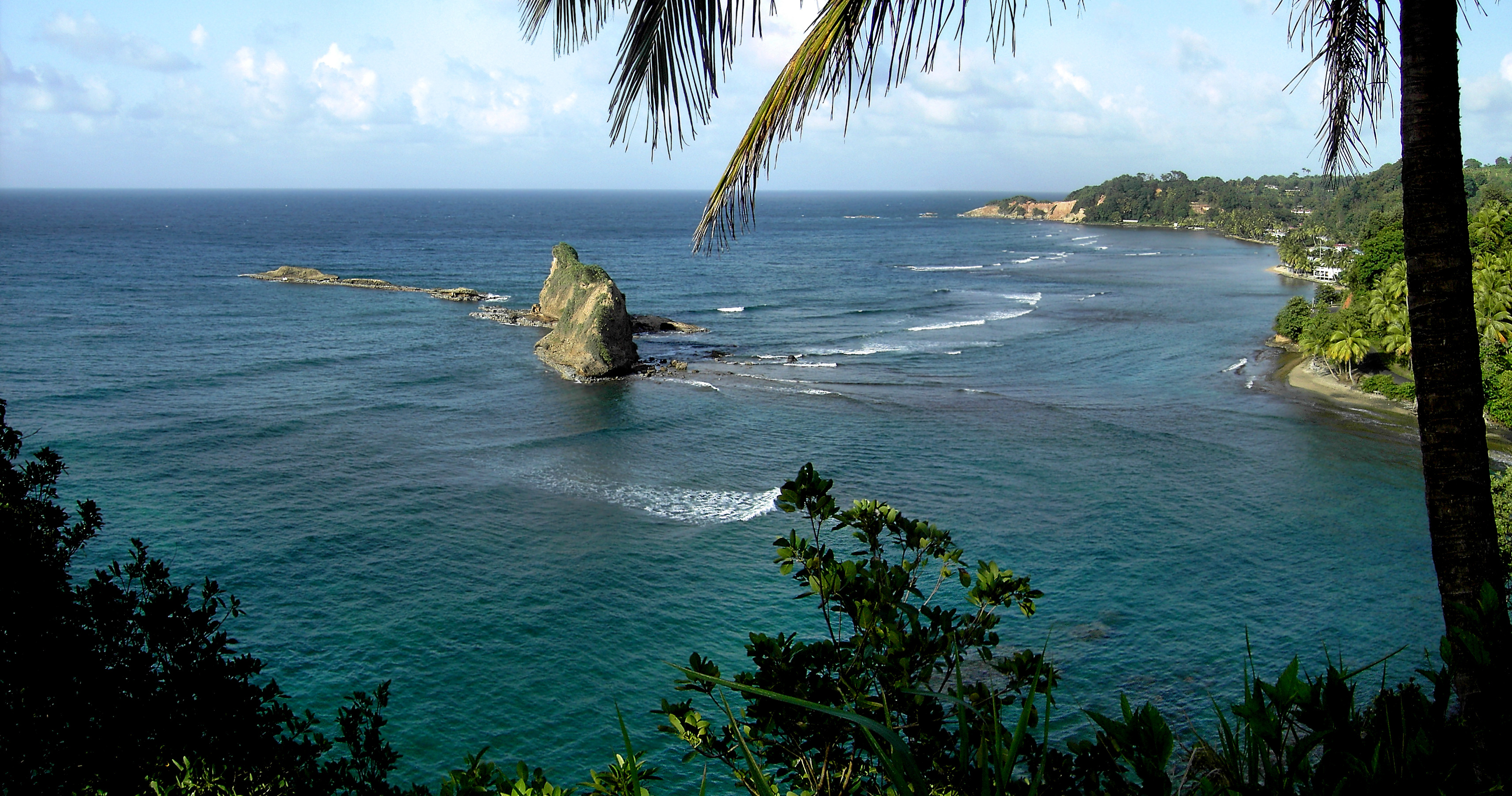
- Calibishie beach

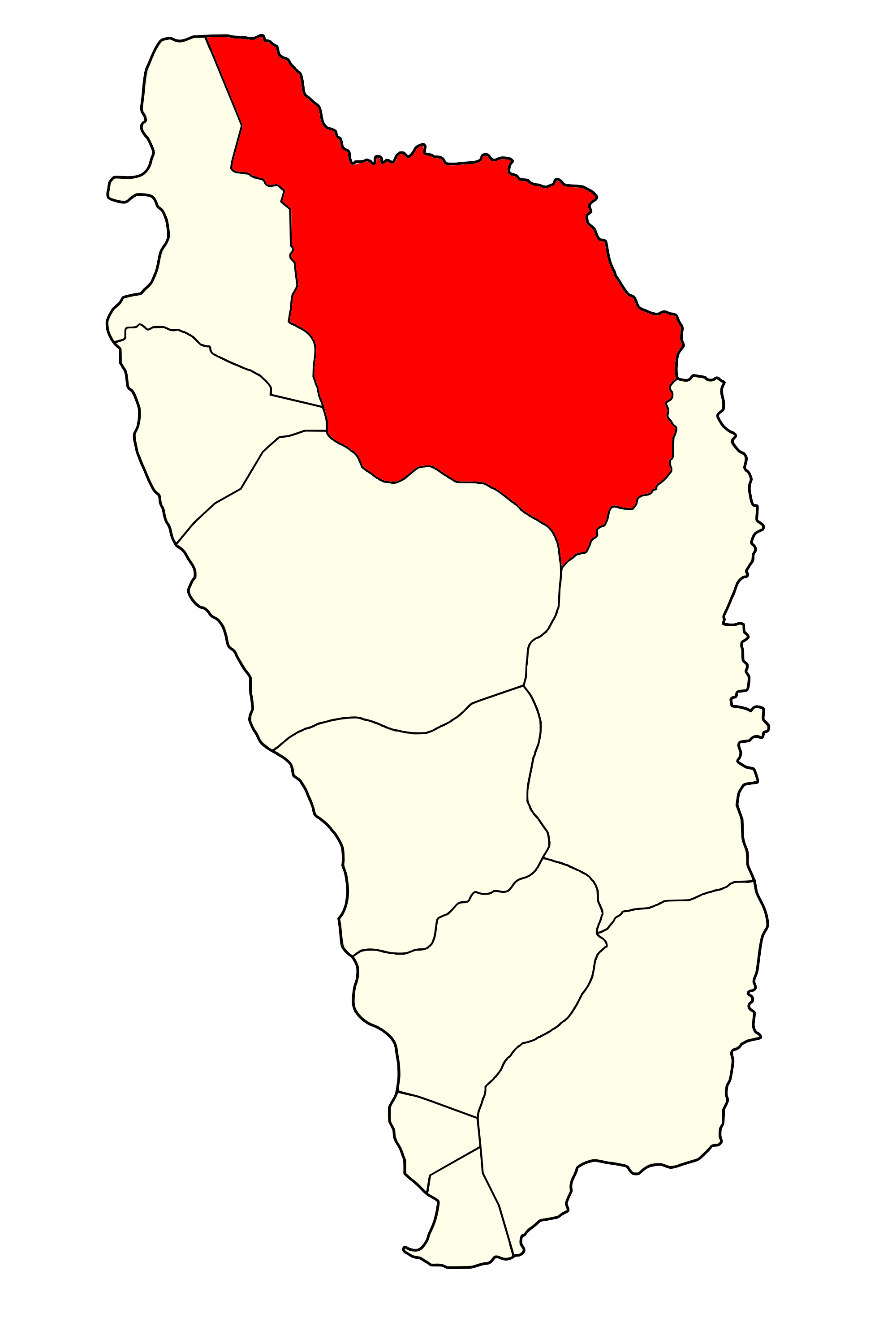
- Country: Dominica
- Capital: Marigot

Area
  - Total: 178.1 km^{2} (68.8 sq mi)

Population (2011)
  - Total: 9,471
  - Density: 53.18/km^{2} (137.7/sq mi)
- Time zone: UTC-4

Saint Andrew is one of Dominica's 10 administrative parishes. It is bordered by St. John and St. Peter (to the west), St. Joseph (to the southwest), and St. David (to the southeast).

At 178.27 km^{2} (68.83 mi^{2}), it is the island's largest parish in area. Its population is 10,461, which makes it the second most populated parish, after St. George.

== Settlements ==
Marigot is its largest village, with 2,676 people. Other communities include:

- Wesley
- Woodford Hill
- Calibishie
- Hampstead
- Bense
- Dos D'Ane
- Anse du Mé
- Paix Bouche
- Thibaud
- Vieille Case (also known as Itassi)
- Penville
- Atkinson

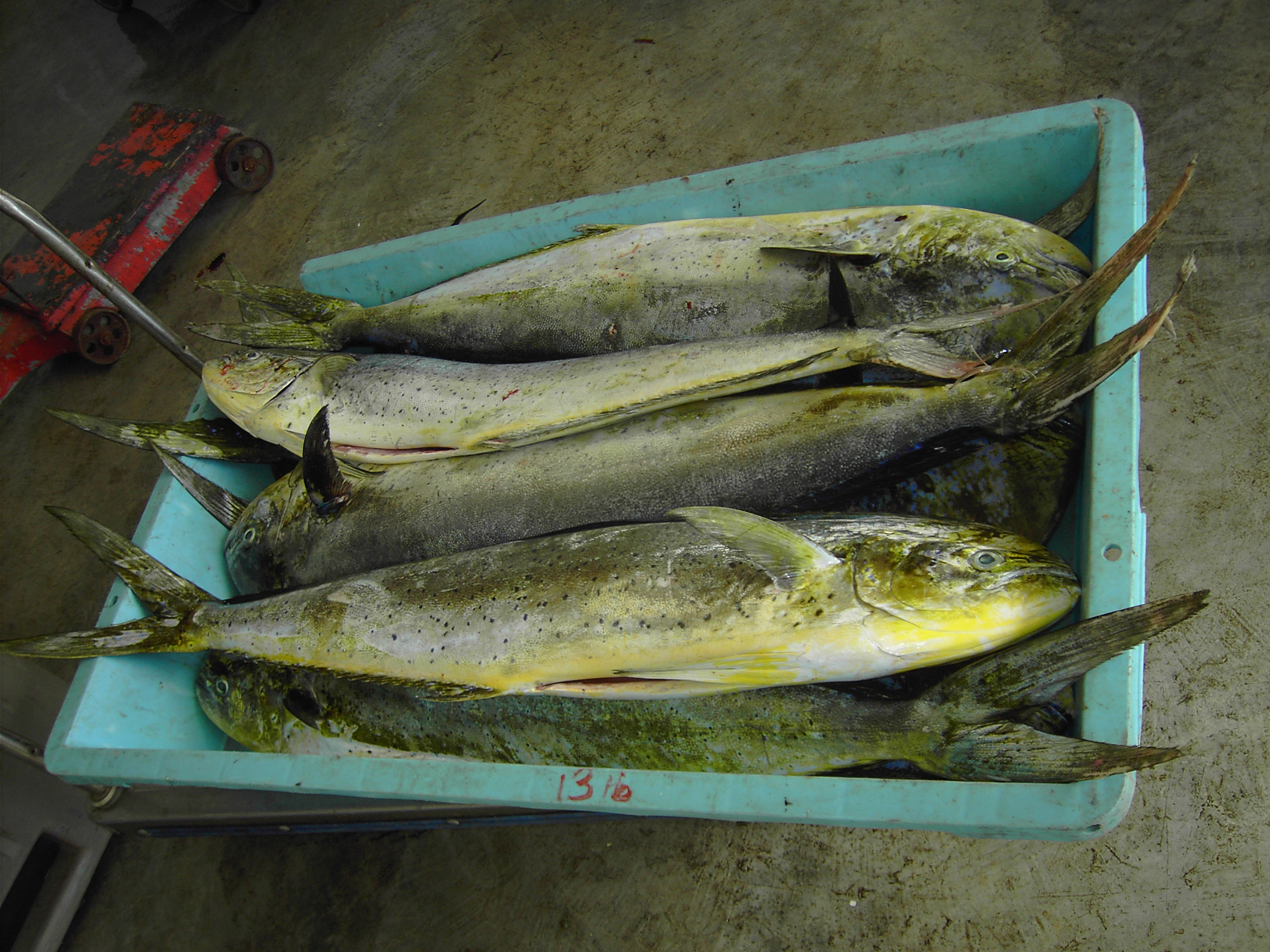
Coryphaena hippurus at Marigot fishing port

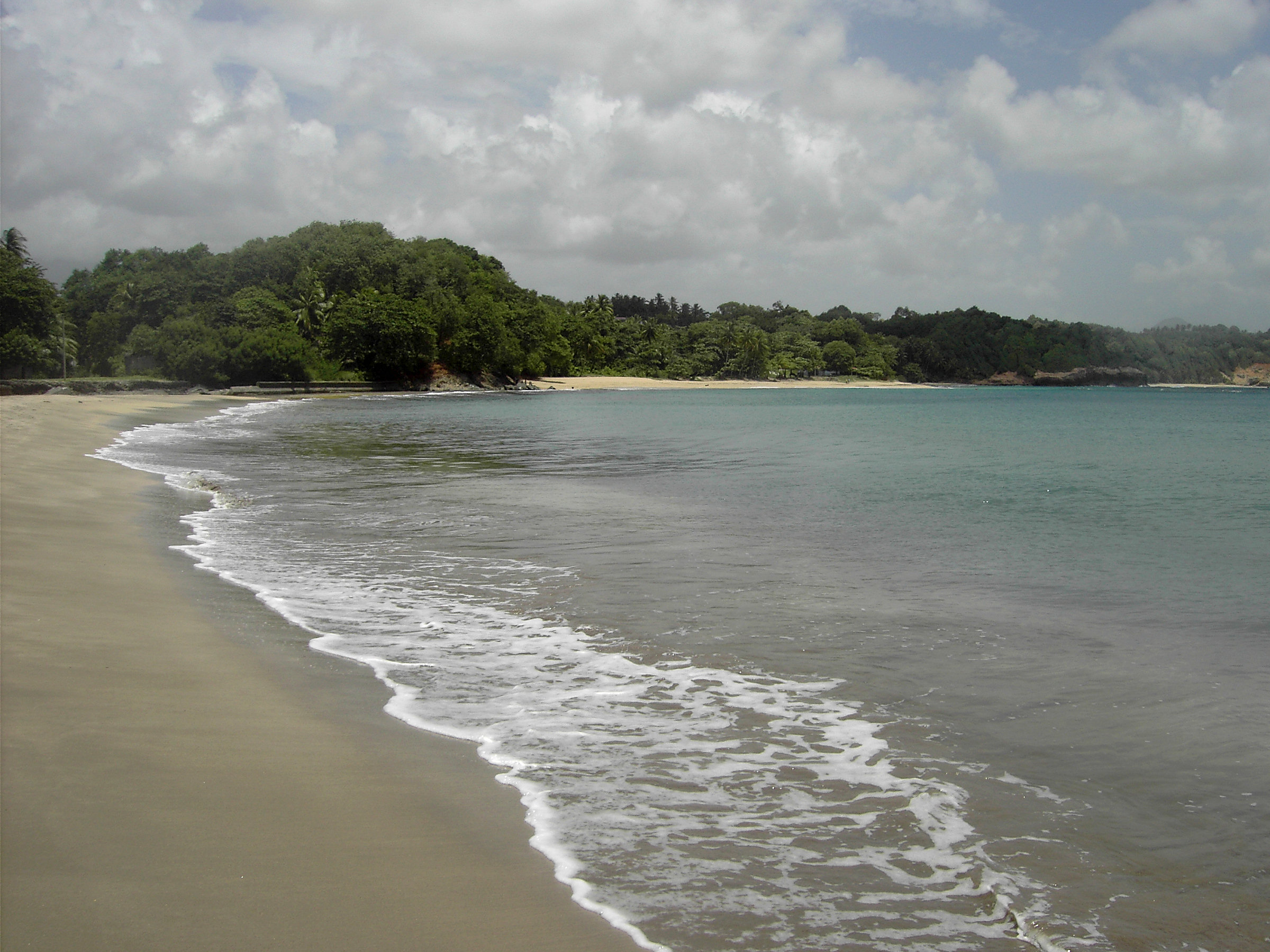
Woodford Hill Bay

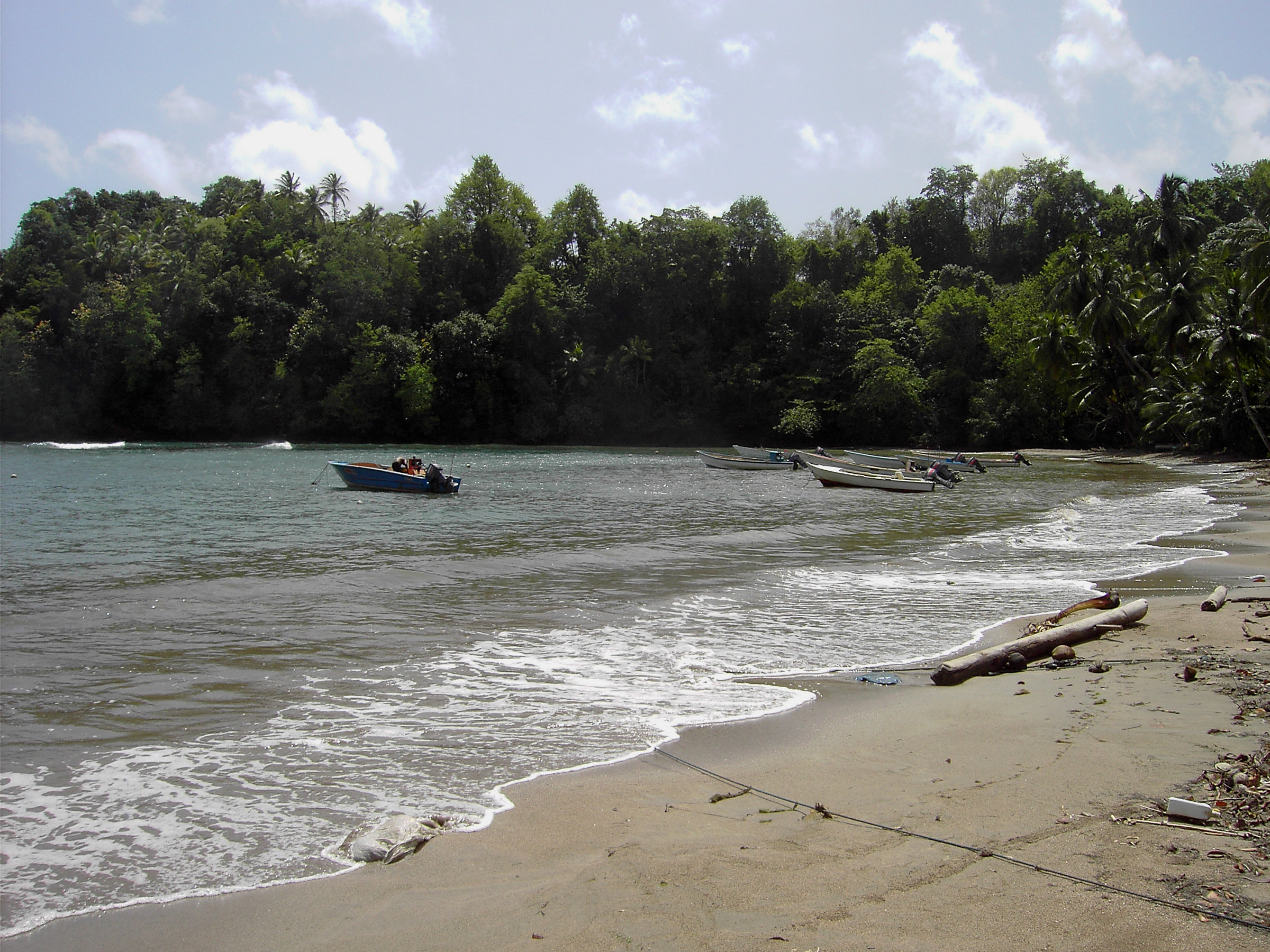
Anse Du Me

== Notable people ==
Well-known people born in the parish include famous schoolteacher Wills Strathmore Stevens (after whom a Marigot school is named), and Dominica's current prime minister, Roosevelt Skerrit (born in Vieille Case).

== Transportation ==
Some of Dominica's most excellent roads can be found in much of St. Andrew's road system.

The parish also boasts Dominica's main airport (at Melville Hall Estate), which opened in 1961. It is now open to night landing.

In 1982, Anse du Mé was made a legal port; the government of Canada provided a floating jetty for the village.

== Industry ==
A Fisheries Complex at Marigot Bay began operation in mid-2004.
