= Atkinson, Dominica =

Coordinates: 15°30′56″N 61°15′58″W

Atkinson
- town
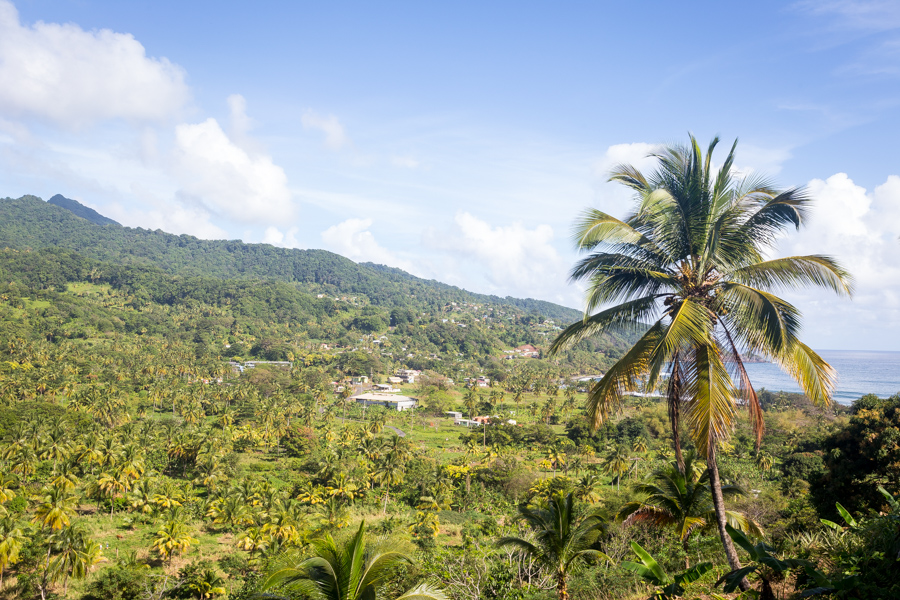
- The view of Castle Bruce near Atkinson
- Interactive map of Atkinson
- Parish: Saint Andrew

Atkinson is a town in Saint Andrew Parish, Dominica.

== Politics ==
In 2023, Mrs. Mutta Matthew was elected chair of the Atkinson Village Council.
