= Hampstead, Dominica =

Hampstead
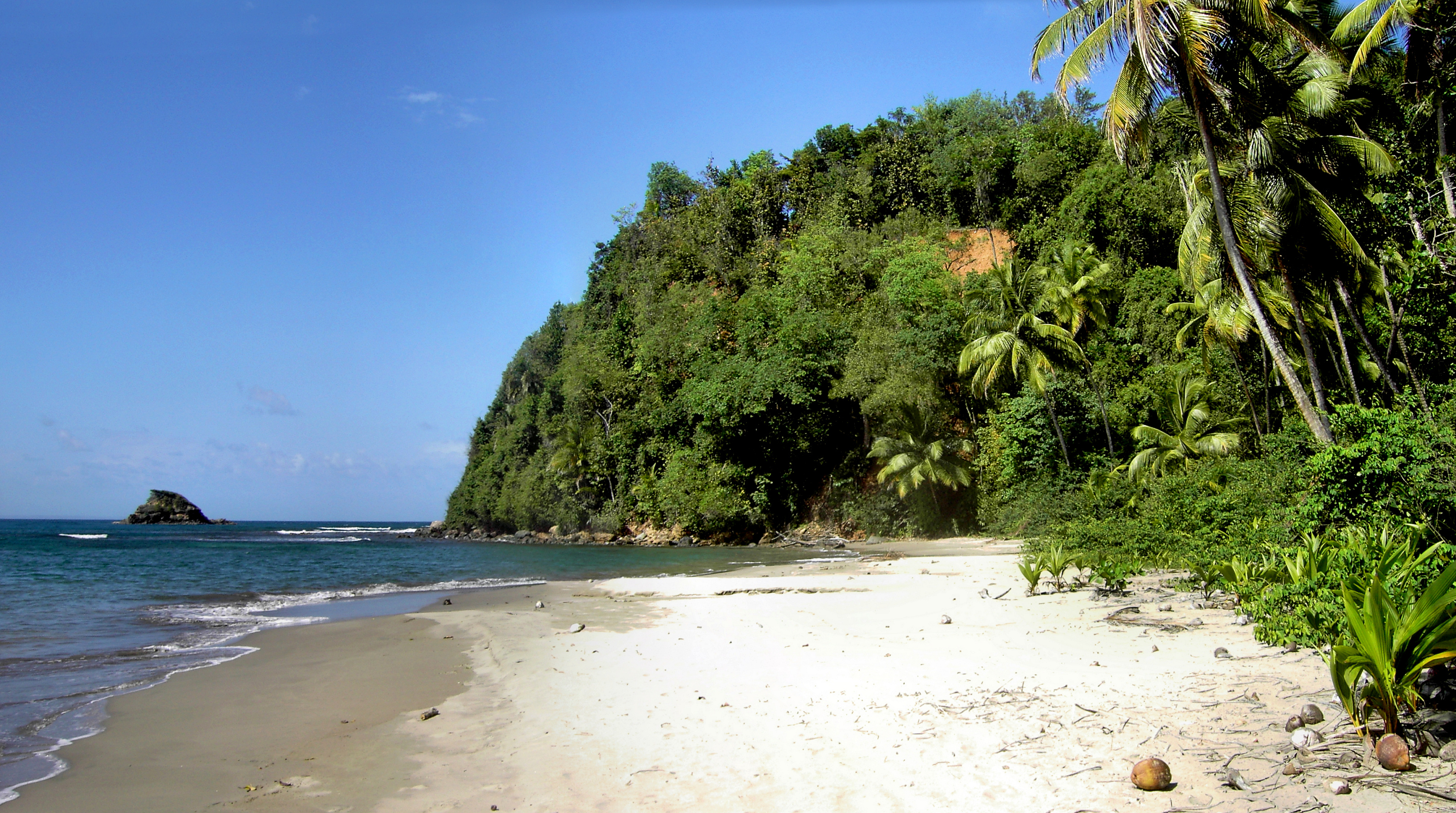

- Location in Dominica
- Coordinates: 15°35′40″N 61°22′10″W
- Country: Dominica
- Parish: Saint Andrew Parish

Population (2001)
  - Total: 495
- Time zone: UTC-4 (UTC)

Hampstead is a village in northeastern Dominica. Along with Bense, the area has a population of 495, and was used as a filming location for 2006's Pirates of the Caribbean: Dead Man's Chest.

== History ==
The area surrounding Hampstead was known by the Caribs as Batibou. The village gets its name from an estate, which was sold by the British and named by the first owners after the London suburb of Hampstead.

During British colonial rule, a sugar factory was powered by water and operated near the banks of the Hampstead River. Today the water wheel remains one of the surviving examples of 18th-century technology. The estate shifted to cocoa and lime production and by the 20th century it had changed again to coconut and copra. The estate was owned by the McIntyre family, but in the 1930s, when the family got into financial difficulties, the government took over the management until R.B. Douglas bought it in 1946. His descendants still own the estate today.

Filmmaker and director Gore Verbinski used Hampstead as a filming location for scenes of a three-way sword fight from Pirates of the Caribbean: Dead Man's Chest.

Since then, tourism has developed in Hampstead and the Batibou Beach is a popular tourist attraction.
