= Paix Bouche =

- Location in Dominica
- Coordinates: 15°35′30″N 61°24′40″W
- Country: Dominica
- Parish: Saint Andrew Parish

Population (2001)
  - Total: 306
- Time zone: UTC-4 (UTC)

Paix Bouche is a village in northern Dominica. It has a population of 306, and has one of the island's steepest roads. The name comes from the local Creole expression meaning "shut your mouth".
