= Rosalie, Dominica =

Coordinates: 15°22′N 61°16′W

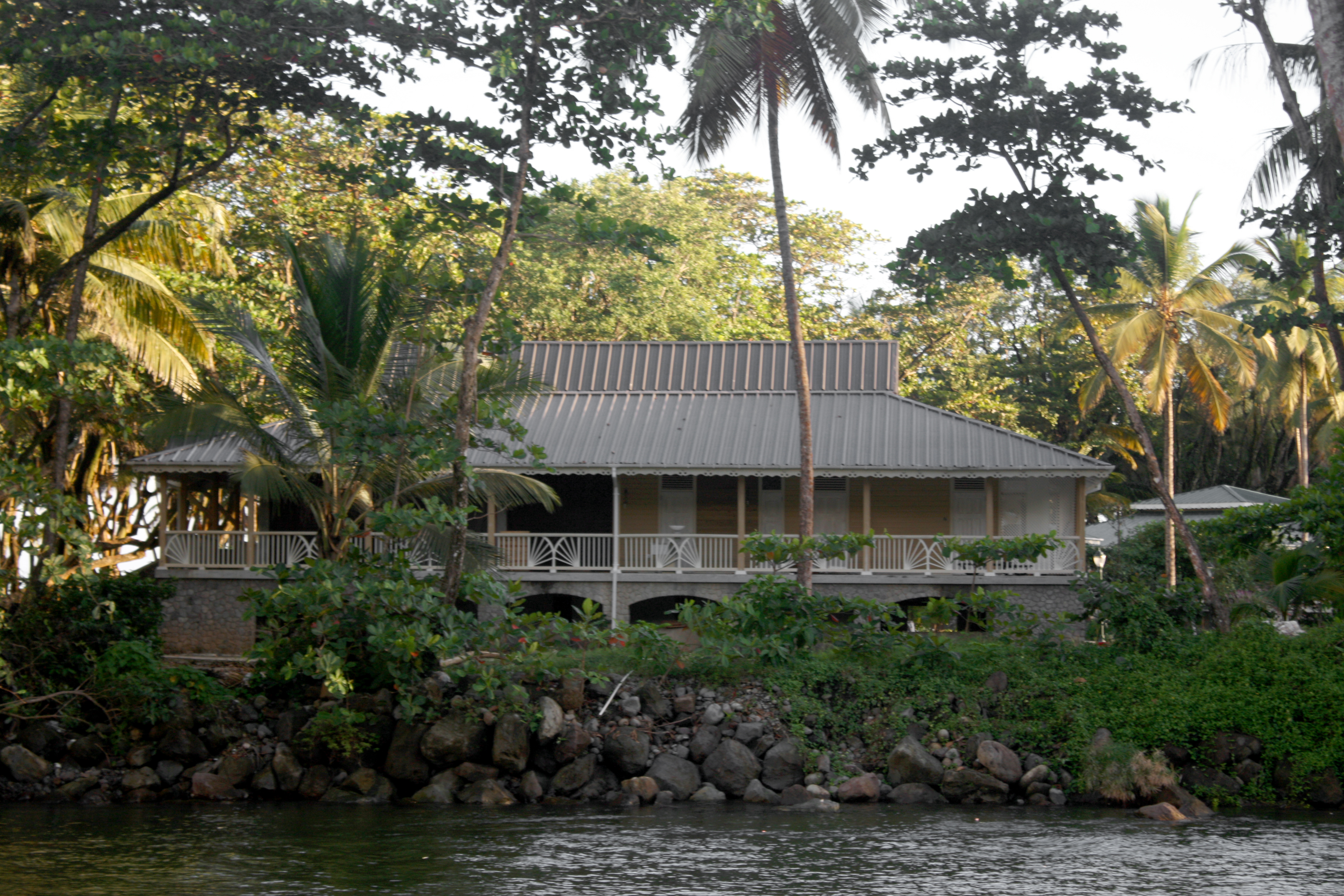
Rosalie

Rosalie is a village in Dominica. It is located in Saint David Parish at the northern end of Rosalie Bay, on the central east coast of the island, close to the mouth of the Rosalie River.
