= Vieille Case =

Vieille Case Itassi
- Village
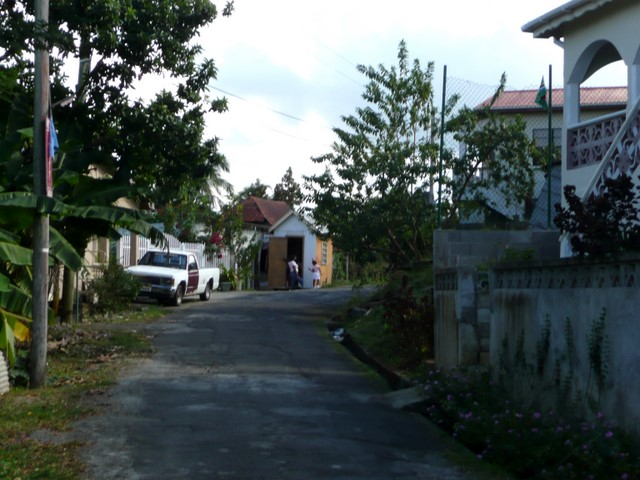

- Location within Dominica
- Coordinates: 15.6143987°N 61.4068794°W
- Country: Dominica
- Parish: Saint Andrew Parish

Population (2001)
  - Total: 726
- Time zone: UTC-4 (UTC)

Vieille Case, sometimes spelled as Vielle-Case, is a village on the north coast of Dominica. The Commonwealth of Dominica in the West Indies was first inhabited by the Kalinago people who were referred to as Caribs by the Europeans. Itassi (pronounced: e-tassy) is the Kalinago name for the area in Dominica which is now known as Vieille Case.

Vieille Case has an estimated population of 726. The name is a local French term for "old house".

When Europeans first settled in the area, they lived there together with the Caribs. The current villagers are mixed descendants of the Kalinagos, the French settlers and the African slaves that were imported to the area.

The centre of the village is called "Under The Mango". There are various shops, similar to convenience stores, located here. Few restaurants can be found in this tropical village. There is however, a shop that sells groceries and fried chicken called "Anna's". The mango tree to which the name refers is no longer in the centre of the village. There are two primary beaches, Au Parc and Au Tout.

Vieille Case was a filming location for Pirates of the Caribbean. The area is the birthplace of politicians Edward Oliver LeBlanc, Roosevelt Skerrit, Alexis Williams, Maynard Joseph and Vernice Bellony.

== Recreation ==
There are two main beaches in Vieille Case:

- Au Parc, used primarily for swimming
- Au Tout, used primarily for fishing.

== Genealogy ==
The most common family names include Joseph, LeBlanc, Royer, Seaman, Augustine and Brumant.

== Agriculture ==
High in the mountains above the village lies an expanse of land called "La Vie Douce" (The sweet life). This is the primary place for farming Dasheen, Ginger, Yams, Pepper and Bananas. Many citizens use farming to make a living. The village also has a miniature market on the outer edge of "Under The Mango", used to sell some of the provisions brought down by the farmers.

== Churches ==
The Catholic Church that was located just up the street from the Credit Union of Vieille Case collapsed during 2005 because of a severe earthquake. The church was split down the middle. A link to few pictures of the aftermath is at http://mydominica.org. Vieille Case is predominantly Catholic but there are Church of Christ, Gospel Mission and Pentecostal churches.

== Education ==
There is one school located in Vieille Case which is the Primary School. Other schools that are near (Close to Vieille Case) Portsmouth Secondary School, Dominica Seventh Day Adventist Secondary School, Portsmouth St John's Junior Secondary School.

== Notable people ==
- Jerelle Joseph
