= Good Hope, Dominica =

Coordinates: 15°24′N 61°16′W

Good Hope, Dominica

Good Hope is a small fishing farming community located on the east coast of Dominica. The community is home to about 500 residents. The community is mainly managed by a Resource Centre Management Committee, which oversees projects of development, the functioning of the community's resource centre and also the overall well-being of the community.

== Geography ==
Good Hope has one small and rocky beach. A short distance from shore are two small rock outcroppings which can be climbed and played upon. These are locally known as "Ti Loo" and "Gwo Loo".

== Facilities ==
Within the community you can find a few local "shops", one disco, the aforementioned resource centre (which contains a pre-school, main hall, computer centre, library and kitchen) and local homes. The village has had access to running water, electricity and cable television for about 10-15 years. Most households have electricity and cable television. Some households have running water.
