= Castle Bruce =

Village on the east coast of Dominica

Coordinates: 15°26′30″N 61°15′25″W

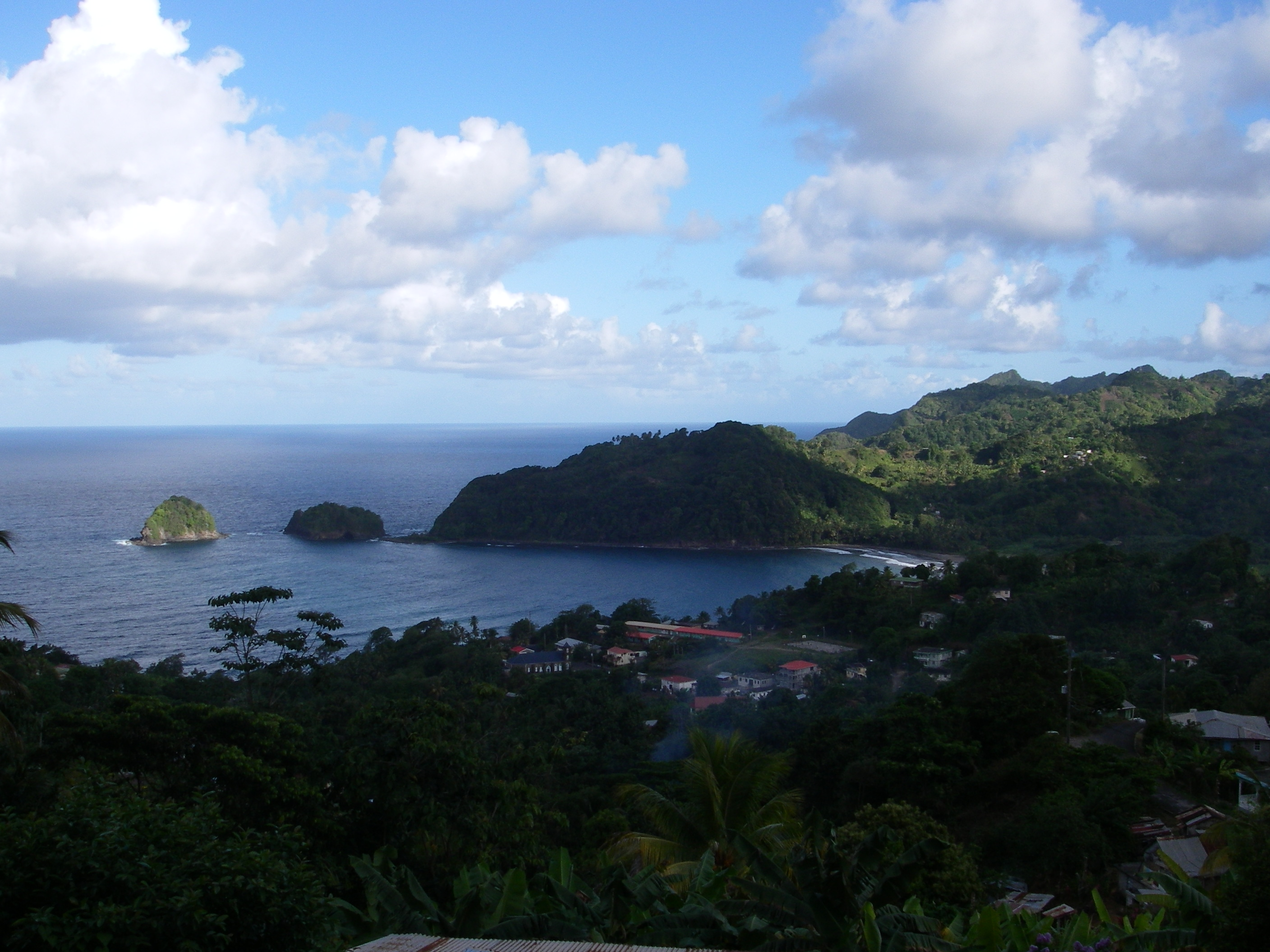
Castle Bruce

Castle Bruce is a village on the east coast of Dominica. It is the largest settlement in St. David Parish, with a population of 1,339.

== Politics ==
Castle Bruce (Dominica constituency)
