= Shillingford (disambiguation) =

Shillingford may refer to:

== Places ==
=== England ===
- Shillingford, a village near Wallingford, Oxfordshire.
  - Shillingford Bridge, Bridge in Shillingford, Oxfordshire.
- Shillingford, Devon, a village near Bampton, Devon.
- Shillingford St George, a village near Exeter, Devon. Historically known as Shillingford.
- Shillingford, a historic name of the village Shellingford in Oxfordshire.
  - Shellingford Crossroads Quarry, Quarry near Shellingford, Oxfordshire.
  - RAF Shellingford, former Royal Air Force station near Shellingford, Oxfordshire.

== People ==
=== Notable people with the surname include ===
- A. C. Shillingford (1882–1938), Dominican businessman
- Arden Shillingford (1936-2019), Dominican diplomat
- Cara Shillingford, Dominican lawyer
- Grayson Shillingford (1944–2009), West Indian cricketer
- H. D. Shillingford (1888 – 1975), Dominican politician & planter
- John Shillingford (died 1458), English politician
- John Parsons Shillingford (1914–1999), English physician
- Irvine Shillingford (1944–2023), West Indian cricketer
- Roger Shillingford (fl. 1421), English politician
- Shane Shillingford (born 1983), West Indian cricketer

=== Notable people with the middle name include ===
- Robert Shillingford Babcock (1915–1985), American professor and politician
- David Shillingford Paynter (1900–1975), Sri Lankan painter

== See also ==
Shillingford (surname)
