= Shillingford (surname) =

Surname list

Origin
- Region of origin: England

Shillingford is an English habitational surname, derived from any of the places named Shillingford in Devon and Oxfordshire.

Notable people with the surname include:

== Surname ==
- A. C. Shillingford (1882–1938), Dominican businessman
- Arden Shillingford (1936-2019), Dominican diplomat
- Cara Shillingford, Dominican lawyer
- Grayson Shillingford (1944–2009), West Indian cricketer
- Gloria Shillingford, Dominican educator & politician
- H. D. Shillingford (1888 – 1975), Dominican politician
- John Shillingford (died 1458), English politician
- John Parsons Shillingford (1914–1999), English physician
- Irvine Shillingford (1944–2023), West Indian cricketer
- Roger Shillingford (fl. 1421), English politician
- Shane Shillingford (born 1983), West Indian cricketer

== Middle name ==
- Robert Shillingford Babcock (1915–1985), American professor and politician
- David Shillingford Paynter (1900–1975), Sri Lankan painter

== See also ==
Shillingford (disambiguation)
