= List of Dominica writers =

Links to articles about writers born in or associated with Dominica

This list of Dominica writers includes those born in or associated with the Commonwealth of Dominica.

== A ==
- Phyllis Shand Allfrey (1908–1986)
- Thomas Atwood (died 1793)

== B ==
- Alwin Bully (1948–2023)

== C ==
- J. R. Ralph Casimir (1898–1996)
- Cissie Caudeiron (1909–1968)

== E ==
- Celestine Edwards (born late 1850s)

== H ==
- Lennox Honychurch (born 1952)

== N ==
- Elma Napier (1892–1973)

== R ==
- Jean Rhys (1890–1979)

== S ==
- Edward Scobie (1918–1996)
- Davison Shillingford (born 1940)

== T ==
- Daniel Thaly
