= Alwin Bully =

Dominican cultural administrator, playwright and artist (1948–2023)

Alwin Bully SAH
- Born: Alwin Anthony Bully; 23 November 1948; Roseau, Dominica
- Died: 10 March 2023 (aged 74); Roseau, Dominica
- Education: Dominica Grammar School; St. Mary's Academy
- Occupations: Cultural administrator, playwright and artist
- Known for: Designer of the national flag of Dominica;
- Spouse: Anita Astaphan (m. 1977)
- Children: 3
- Parent(s): Edna and Charles Bully
- Relatives: Cissie Caudeiron (cousin)

Alwin Anthony Bully (23 November 1948 – 10 March 2023) was a Dominican cultural administrator, playwright, actor and artist, who designed the national flag of Dominica. Bully was bestowed with the Sisserou Award of Honour (SAH), the nation's second highest honour, in 1985. He was responsible for establishing and developing Dominica's Department of Culture (Division of Culture) and was its first director. Viewed as being the island's "cultural icon", Bully's contributions were to arts and culture, also impacting on the areas of education and communication, and according to Dominica News Online there was no Dominican more decorated and honoured in those fields than Bully, whose influence extended to the wider Caribbean.

== Biography ==
=== Early years and education ===
Alwin Anthony Bully was born and raised in Roseau, Dominica, attending the Convent Preparatory School, the Dominica Grammar School, and St. Mary's Academy. His mother was an active organizer of social and cultural events, and his father had been, at one time, Captain of the Dominica Defense Force.

Bully recalled in a 2021 interview how his love of playwriting and storytelling came about through early exposure to traditional carnival culture on the city streets and listening to village stories about Soukouyan and Ladjablès: "At Giraudel in particular, the story tellers of the village would come at night and tell us folk tales that had survived the long and dreadful journey from Africa to the Caribbean. These stories had elaborate plots and interesting characters. Further, they always included music and songs and voila I was hooked." He additionally drew inspiration from his parents' interest in Dominica's historical traditions, as well as from the likes of his folklorist cousin Mabel "Cissie" Caudeiron and poet Ralph Casimir.

Bully represented Dominica at the 1965 Commonwealth Arts Festival in Britain, together with members of the Kairi and Dominica Dance troupes. In 1967, Bully went to Barbados to study for a BA Honours degree, majoring in English and French, at the University of the West Indies (UWI) Cave Hill campus, where he established a drama society. Early plays he wrote include Good Morning Miss Millie, which was staged extensively throughout the Caribbean and was published by Penguin and McMillan Caribbean.

=== Career ===
From 1972 to 1978, Bully was a teacher and acting principal at the Dominica Grammar School. Also a creative artist and Carnival costume designer, Bully designed the original flag of Dominica in early 1978 as the country prepared for independence. He said of his design, which has as its centrepiece an image of the sisserou parrot: "I wanted each and every citizen to embrace the symbols, the forests, the land, the rivers and mountains and the wildlife we were blessed with....Of greatest importance to me is the circle with ten stars of the same size, signifying the equality of our ten parishes and every Dominican citizen in these parishes."

In 1978, Bully was invited by then Education Minister, H. L. Christian, to establish a "cultural desk" in the Ministry of Education that eventually developed into a Department of Culture, with Bully becoming Dominica's first Chief Cultural Officer and serving in that position until 1986. Setting out to build a greater sense of cultural identity among Dominicans, he was joined by such others as Pearle Christian. The national recognition he received included the Sisserou Award of Honor in 1985 from the Government of Dominica for his design of the Dominica flag.

He subsequently worked for 20 years in Jamaica for UNESCO as the Caribbean's Cultural Advisor, helping CARICOM states to develop their cultural programmes and policies, and he also chaired the CARIFESTA Interim Festival Directorate, before returning to Dominica in 2008.

=== Writings and other cultural work ===
While in Jamaica, Bully managed the production of UNESCO's six-volume General History of the Caribbean.

His own creative writing included full-length plays, radio serials, screenplays and short stories. From the 1970s, his influence as a playwright led to the growth of theatre in Dominica and the establishment, with his cousin Daniel Caudeiron, of the Little Theatre Movement, later renamed the People's Action Theatre, of which he was artistic director. He adapted G.C.H. Thomas's novel Ruler in Hiroona, as the stage play The Ruler, which in 1976 toured in Barbados and St. Vincent with the People's Action Theatre of Dominica. He composed more than 50 songs, used in the many plays he directed in a style that he referred to as calypso theatre, with his theatrical work earning him a long list of awards.

In 2010, he played the lead role in the film A Hand Full of Dirt, which premiered that year at the Trinidad and Tobago Film Festival.

Bully initiated and chaired the Nature Island Literary Festival and Book Fair, launched in 2008 and held annually until 2017.

His last book, a collection entitled The Cocoa Dancer and Other Stories, was published by Papillote Press in 2021.

In November 2022, Bully's 74th birthday was celebrated with a presentation by historian Lennox Honychurch entitled "The Sternest Passion: Alwin Bully & the Caribbean Cultural Renaissance".

=== Influence ===
Honor Ford-Smith, Professor Emerita at York University, writes: "[H]e transformed Caribbean theatre from colonial amateur theatrics to a place where the complexities of imagined community and nation can be envisioned and enacted. For him, as for his generation of artists, performance was a place of entertainment AND a public space for teaching and learning. ... His plays combined popular realism, topicality, comedy, romance, politics and music as tactics for opening access to the stage and creating work that would appeal to everyone."

Paying tribute to Bully, alongside Jah Shaka, who died in April 2023, Global Voices stated: "Both were enormously influential in their respective spheres, breaking new ground. Both had a strong sense of community. Both were closely connected to their roots, and both — Dominican playwright Alwin Bully and Jamaican dub pioneer Jah Shaka — who passed away recently, were quintessentially Caribbean."

=== Death and legacy ===
Alwin Bully died on 10 March 2023, at the age of 74. He had been suffering from Parkinson's disease.

Dominican Prime Minister Roosevelt Skerrit announced that Bully would be accorded an official funeral in recognition of his national contribution and that flags would be flown at half-mast for two days to honour him (on 5 April, the day of his funeral, and on the preceding day). Skerrit stated: "His legacy is all around us, in the National Flag he designed in 1978 as Dominica gained its Independence from Great Britain. ...incorporat[ing] aspects of Dominica's natural features, and the spirit character and values of our people"; the Prime Minister also lauded Bully for "the many national organisations he spearheaded, including the National Cultural Council, the Dominica Artists' Guild, the Writers' Guild, the Carnival Organising Committee and the Komité Pou Etid Kwéyòl" as well as for "the mentorship he provided to young playwrights, actors, directors, writers, costume designers and other creatives, who now proudly speak of the influence he had on their lives and work."

The funeral took place at Roseau Catholic Chapel on 5 April 2023. Prime Minister Skerrit said in the wake of the ceremony for Bully: "His memory lives on."

== Personal life ==
Born to Charles and Edna Bully, Alwin as a child lived on King George V Street, Roseau. In 1977, he married Anita (née Astaphan), and the couple had three children: Peron (deceased), Brent, and Sade Bully.

== Selected awards ==
- 1978: Honoured as Man of the year by The Chronicle national newspaper.
- 1985: Sisserou Award of Honour from the Government of Dominica.
- 2007: Life-time Achievement Cacique Award from The National Drama Association of Trinidad and Tobago
- 2008: University of the West Indies (UWI) Alumni Award for Excellence
- 2011: Honorary Doctorate of Letters (DLIT) from the UWI Open Campus, Antigua.
- 2021: "QDOS" National Award for Lifetime Achievement in Arts, Theatre and Culture.
- 2022: Lifetime Achievement Award from the Earl Warner Trust "in recognition of his outstanding achievement in the Performing Arts and his ongoing advocacy for the Caribbean cultural expressions."

== Selected works ==
- Good Morning Miss Millie (play), Penguin Books and Macmillan Caribbean, 1968.
- A Dance in the Dark (radio play), BBC, 1980.
- J.D., D-J : a one act play for secondary schools, UNDP/UNESCO/AGFUND Multi-Island Project CAR/83/001, 1984.
- Oseyi and the Masqueraders
- Champions of the Gayelle: A Collection of Plays (collection of three plays by Alwin Bully, Zeno Constance and Pat Cumper), Macmillan Caribbean, 2002.
- The Ruler (stage adaptation of novel Ruler in Hiroona by G. C. H. Thomas), France: L'Autre Souffle Company, 2017.
- The Cocoa Dancer and Other Stories (short stories), Papillote Press, 2021, ISBN 9781838041564
