= 1931 Dominican general election =

General elections were held in Dominica in March 1931.

== Electoral system ==
The Legislative Council had 13 members, with the Administrator as President, six 'official' members (civil servants), four elected members and two appointed members. Candidacy for the elected seats was limited to people with an annual income of at least £200 or owning property valued at £500 or more.

== Results ==
Constituency	Elected member
Roseau	Ralph Edgar Alford Nicholls
St George, St Paul, St Luke and St Mark	Randall Hippolyte Lockhart
St Joseph, St Peter, St John and St Andrew	H. D. Shillingford
St Patrick and St David	John Baptiste Charles
Source: Pierre

The appointed members were Geoffrey Francis Ashpitel and J.R.H. Bridgewater. Bridgewater died on 10 October 1931 and was replaced by Cecil Rawle.

== Aftermath ==
All four elected members resigned on 15 February 1932 and the two nominated members resigned on 21 June the same year. By-elections were scheduled for October, but no nominations were received. The two nominated members were replaced by William James Ross Stebbings and Norman Keith Lockhart in October. Lockhart resigned the following month and was replaced by Rawle.
