= 1934 Dominican general election =

General elections were held in Dominica in November 1934.

== Electoral system ==
The Legislative Council had 13 members, with the Administrator as president, six 'official' members (civil servants), four elected members and two appointed members. Candidacy for the elected seats was limited to people with an annual income of at least £200 or owning property valued at £500 or more.

== Results ==
Constituency	Elected member
Roseau	Ralph Edgar Alford Nicholls
St George, St Paul, St Luke and St Mark	Phillip Alexander Rolle
St Joseph, St Peter, St John and St Andrew	Howell Donald Shillingford
St Patrick and St David	John Baptiste Charles
Source: Pierre

The appointed members were William James Ross Stebbings and Cecil Rawle.
