= 1925 Dominican general election =

Election in Dominica

General elections were held in Dominica in July 1925. They were the first after the reintroduction of elected members to the Legislative Council for the first time since 1898.

== Electoral system ==
The reformed Legislative Council had 13 members, with the Administrator as President, six 'official' members (civil servants), four elected members and two appointed members. Candidacy for the elected seats was limited to people with an annual income of at least £200 or owning property valued at £500 or more.

== Results ==
All four elected members were black.

Constituency	Elected member
Roseau	Cecil Rawle
St George, St Paul, St Luke and St Mark	Sydney Green
St Joseph, St Peter, St John and St Andrew	Howell Donald Shillingford
St Patrick and St David	Alexander Arthur Baron
Source: Pierre

The appointed members were J.R.H. Bridgewater and Laughlan Rose. Rose resigned on 27 March 1926 and was replaced by Henry Harry Vivian Whitchurch.
