= John Shillingford =

English politician

Member of Parliament for Exeter

Mayor of Exeter

Personal details
- Died: 1458
- Relations: Roger Shillingford
- Children: William Shillingford
- Occupation: politician; merchant; landowner

John Shillingford (died 1458) of Exeter and Shillingford, Devon. Was an English politician, merchant and landowner, who served multiple terms as Mayor of Exeter. He played a significant role in the city's civic and legal affairs.

He was a Member of the Parliament of England (MP) for Exeter in December 1421, 1431 and 1433. He was mayor of Exeter 1428–30, 1444–5, 1446–8. In 1447, he was involved in fundraising efforts to repair the Old Exe Bridge in Exeter. He secured the promise of a contribution from John Kemp, the Archbishop of York, from the estate of the late Henry Beaufort but he died before the contribution was received.

== Career ==
Shillingford became a freeman of Exeter on 14 November 1418 and was active in civic affairs. He attended the 1417 shire elections at Exeter Castle and established himself as a merchant. In 1421, he served as the mainpernor for John Shapleigh II and his kinsman Roger Shillingford, who were elected to Parliament, though records indicate that he was the one reimbursed for attending the Commons. On 1 December 1421, he was formally appointed as a constable of the local Staple by the Crown.

Recognized for his administrative abilities, Shillingford was appointed a feoffee for the foundation of almshouses in Exeter and served as an executor of the will of William Wynard, the city recorder, alongside Chief Justice John Fortescue. He was also frequently sent on business to London.

Shillingford served as Mayor of Exeter multiple times, including in 1444, when he initially resisted the appointment but was compelled to accept the role by a writ under the privy seal, facing a fine of £1,000 if he refused. According to the historian John Hooker, he ultimately performed his duties well.

Shillingford’s tenure as mayor coincided with a significant legal dispute between Exeter’s civic authorities and the cathedral leadership, led by Bishop Edmund Lacy and the dean and chapter. His letters from this period provide insight into his leadership, negotiation skills, and personality. The bishop accused him of causing considerable disruption to both the church and the city. Shillingford traveled to London in 1447–48 to argue Exeter’s case before Chancellor John Stafford and Chief Justice John Fortescue.

The legal battle proved costly, and Shillingford often referenced his financial difficulties in letters, writing that he was "right merry and fare[d] right well, ever thanking God and [his] own purse," and noting that "money is like to be scarce with me, considering the business and cost that I have had." Despite the expenses, he reportedly made a favorable impression on Stafford and later sought financial assistance from Archbishop John Kemp for the reconstruction of Exe Bridge.

== Family ==
The family were lords of the Manor of Widecombe in Dartmoor from c. 1216 residing at North Hall Manor House whence they were known simply as the family of Ralph (or FitzRalph), later adopting the surname Shillingford toward the end of the century.

The Shillingford family, held the manor of Shillingford, located approximately three miles from Exeter, and had longstanding ties to the city's governance. Ralph Shillingford served as Recorder of Exeter in the 1350s and represented Devon in Parliament in 1343. Other notable members of the family included Baldwin Shillingford (d. 1417/18) and his brother John (d. 1406), both of whom were canons at Exeter Cathedral.

Shillingford was not part of the main line of the family but eventually inherited the Shillingford estates. In 1428, he had shared with his 'cosyn' William Shillingford a quarter of a knight’s fee in Widecombe-in-the-Moor, but it was William alone who then had possession of the family estates in Shillingford, ‘Stapilhull’ and Farringdon, along with the advowsons of Shillingford and St. Mary Steps, Exeter inheriting them in the 1430s from William and were later estimated it to be worth £26 13s.4d. or £33 6s.8d. (approximately equivalent to £29,535 in 2023) per annum. Before this inheritance, he resided in Exeter, leasing properties in Gandy Street and High Street and renting towers at the South Gate along with gardens near Southernhay Weir. In 1448, he was involved in a land conveyance in Duryard valued at £20 per year.

== Legacy ==
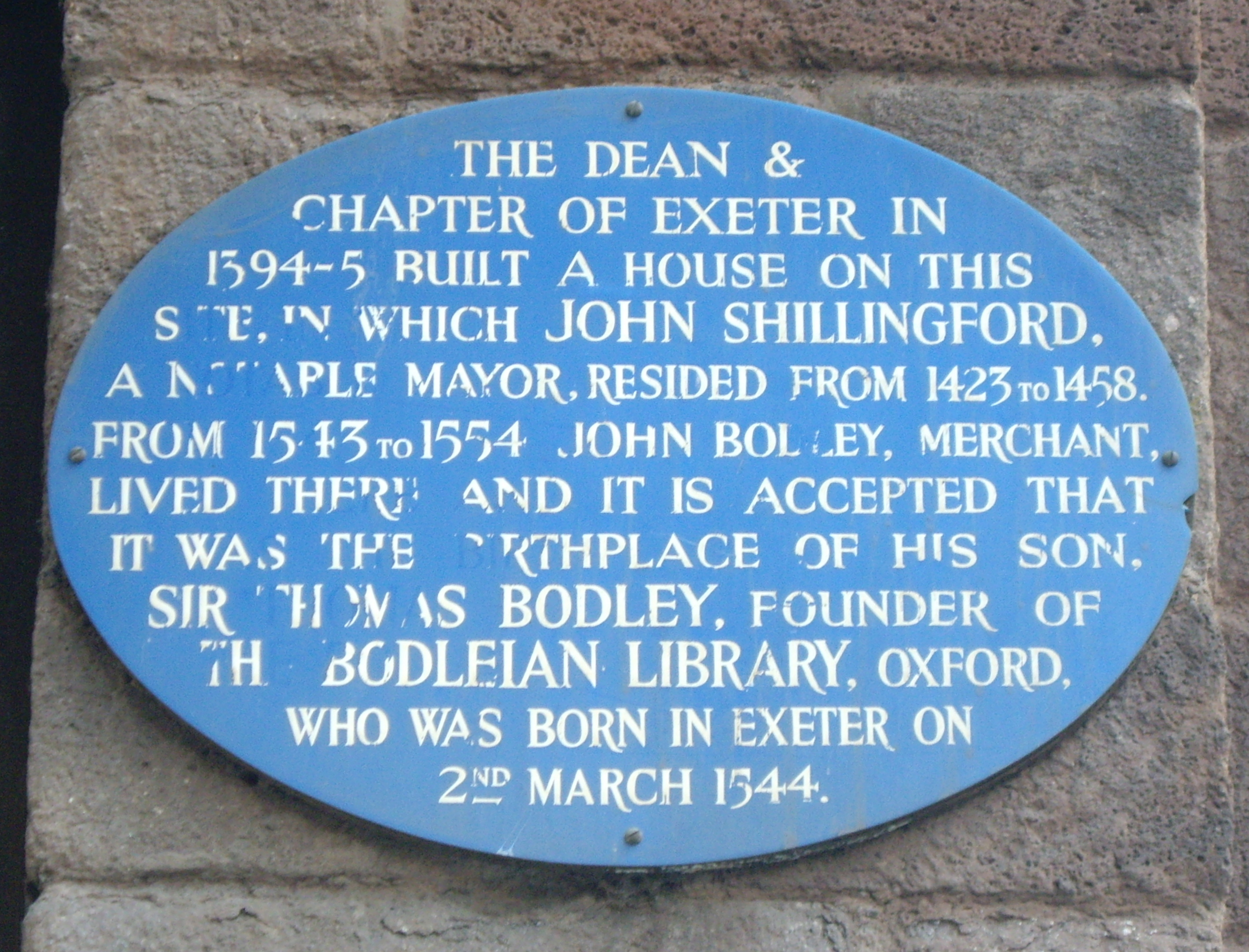
Original plaque in 2014

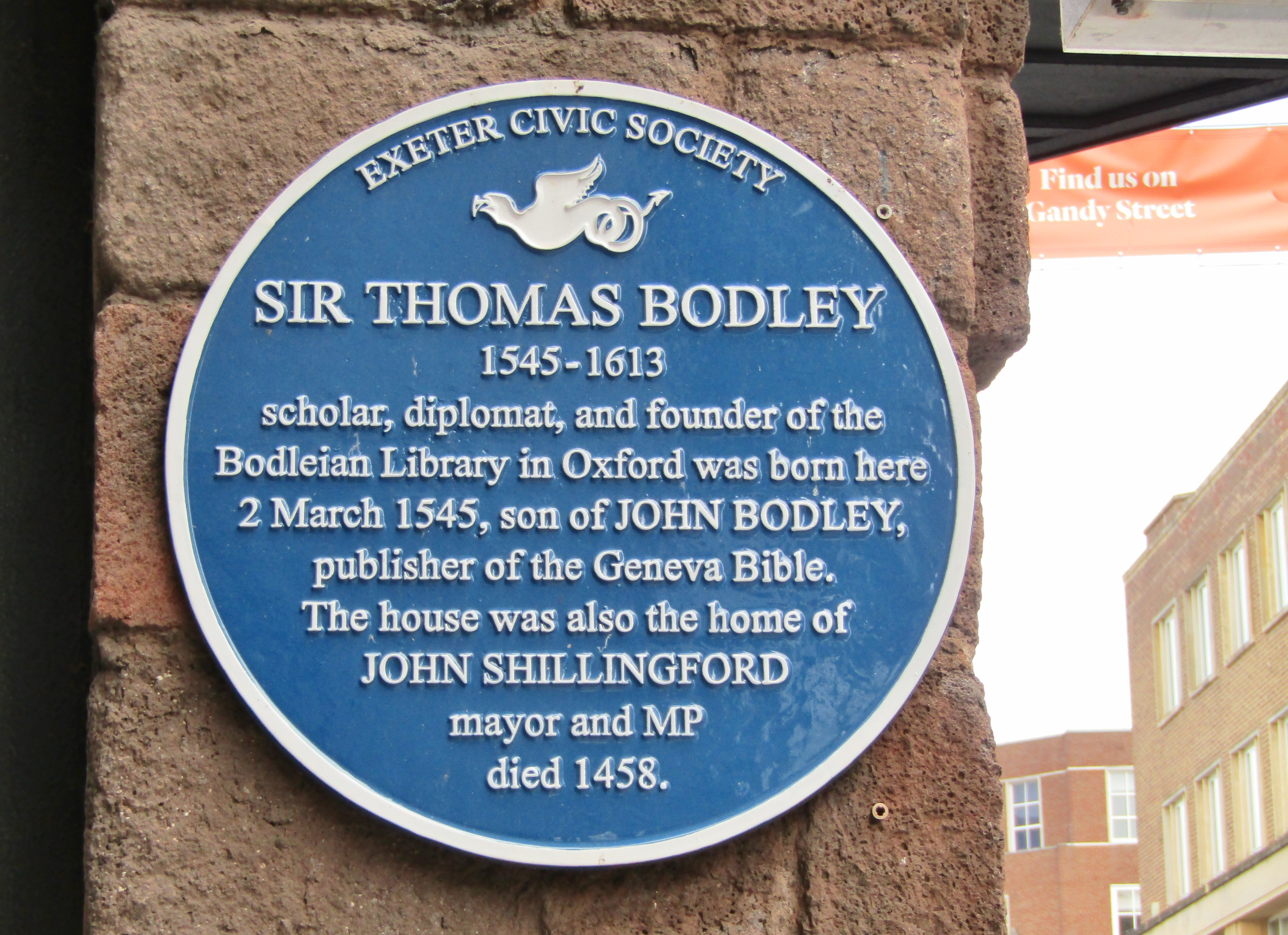
Blue plaque of Sir Thomas Bodley mentioning Shillingford, in 2019

Shillingford’s will has not survived, but legal records indicate that his son, William, later petitioned the Court of Chancery (c. 1460–1465) regarding his father’s intended bequest to the Hospital of St. John in Exeter. John Shillingford had planned to grant ten marks per year to fund a secular priest to pray for his soul, but he ultimately refrained from doing so, as it was deemed inappropriate given the terms of his inheritance. Shillingford has had 2 plaques mentioning his residence at the corner of Gandy Street and High Street, Exeter, on a property built on the site he lived at between 1423–1458.

== Notes ==
- 1.Exeter City RO, mayors’ ct. rolls 7 Hen. V-35 Hen. VI.
- 2.C67/24, 25; C267/6/52, 53, 58, 59.
- 3.M.E. Curtis, City v. Cathedral Authorities (Hist. Exeter Research Group Mono. v), 71-74; Trans. Devon Assoc. lxx. 421; Reg. Stafford ed. Hingeston-Randolph, 328, 387, 417 (John, the MP, is incorrectly described as ‘brother’ of Baldwin in the printed edition of the Register); Biog. Reg. Univ. Oxf. ed. Emden, iii. 1689-90.
- 4.Trans. Devon Assoc. xliv. 507; xcii. 148-9; G. Oliver, Monasticon Dioecesis Exoniensis, 143; mayor’s ct. roll 2-3 Hen. IV m. 1; Exeter City RO, ED/M/790; Feudal Aids, i. 444, 487; Reg. Lacy (Canterbury and York Soc. lxi), 11, 13; C1/11/120; C131/71/3, 73/3; CP25(1)46/90/298.
- 5.Mayor’s ct. roll 6-7 Hen. V m. 7d; C219/12/2; CIMisc. vii. 572.
- 6.C219/12/6; Exeter receivers’ accts. 9-10 Hen. V.
- 7.Notes and Gleanings, iv. 188; v. 18; PCC 14 Rous; C1/24/39; Add. Ch. 64173; Exeter receivers’ accts. 2-3, 10-12, 24-25 Hen. VI.
- 8.Letters and Pprs. Shillingford (Cam. Soc. n.s. ii), pp. xxiii-iv, 142; Curtis, 24-25.
- 9.Letters and Pprs. Shillingford, passim.
- 10.C1/27/241, 31/9. William died in 1480 in full possession of the estates: C140/76/70.
