= 1947 Dominican general election =

Election in Dominica

General elections were held in Dominica in May 1947.

== Electoral system ==
The Legislative Council had eleven members; the Administrator as president, two ex officio members, three appointed members and five elected members. The Administrator could vote only to break a tie.

== Results ==
Constituency	Elected member
Eastern	Elma Napier
Northern	Tyrell Michael Bertrand
Roseau	C.A.H. Dupigny
Southern	Arthur Pemberton
Western	George Austin Winston
Source: Pierre

The appointed members were James O. Aird, Clement Joseph Leonard Dupigny and H. D. Shillingford.
