= 1944 Dominican general election =

General elections were held in Dominica in April 1944.

== Electoral system ==
The Legislative Council had eleven members; the Administrator as president, two ex officio members, three appointed members and five elected members. The Administrator could vote only to break a tie.

== Results ==
Constituency	Elected member
Eastern	C.A.H. Dupigny
Northern	H. D. Shillingford
Southern	Arthur Pemberton
Town	Ralph Edgar Alford Nicholls
Western	Austin Winston
Source: Pierre

The appointed members were Arthur Seagar Burleigh, Clement Joseph Leonard Dupigny and James O. Aird.

== Aftermath ==
Nicholls died on 12 November 1945. In the subsequent by-election on 23 February 1946, Phillip Ivor Boyd was elected to replace him.
