= 1928 Dominican general election =

General elections were held in Dominica in March 1928.

== Electoral system ==
The Legislative Council had 13 members, with the Administrator as President, six 'official' members (civil servants), four elected members and two appointed members. Candidacy for the elected seats was limited to people with an annual income of at least £200 or owning property valued at £500 or more.

== Results ==
Constituency	Elected member
Roseau	Ralph Edgar Alford Nicholls
St George, St Paul, St Luke and St Mark	Laughlan Rose
St Joseph, St Peter, St John and St Andrew	H. D. Shillingford
St Patrick and St David	John Baptiste Charles
Source: Pierre

The appointed members were Henry Harry Vivian Whitchurch and Gerald Augustus Carlton Grell.
