= Dominica Grammar School =

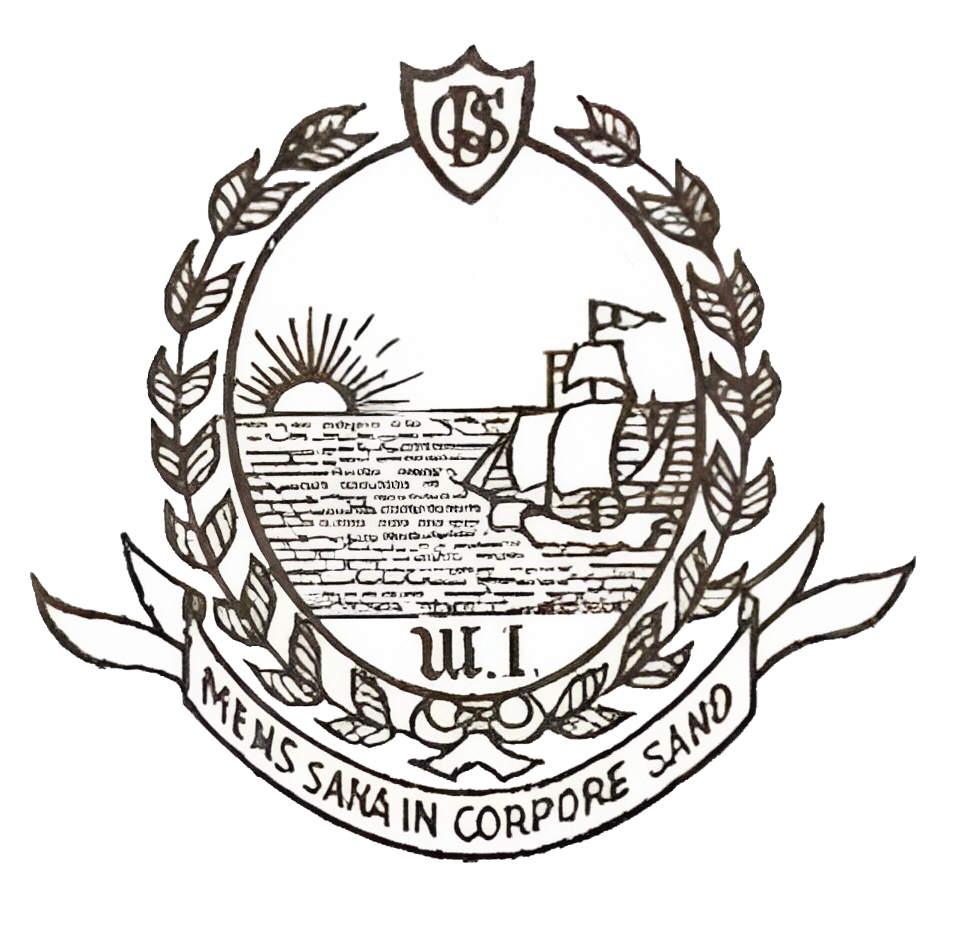
- Roseau; Dominica

Information
- Type: Public School Government School
- Motto: Mens Sana in Corpore Sano (A sound mind in a healthy body)
- Established: 1893; 133 years ago
- Principal: Mrs. Edina Darwton
- Staff: approximately 80
- Colors: Gold and Brown
- Website: http://dgs.sch.dm/

The Dominica Grammar School (DGS) is a public co-education secondary school in Roseau, Dominica, established in 1893, one of the oldest educational institutions on the island. Contrary to its name, the school no longer functions as a traditional grammar school, as it has expanded its curriculum beyond its historical scope.

== History ==
The birthplace of the Dominica Grammar School was in "Lagon", Roseau. It was in the building known as No. 66 Queen Mary Street, now occupied by Mr Ashton Piper, barrister-at-law and solicitor. Up to 1877, the plot of land measuring just over 5,000 square feet (460 m^{2}), at the corner of what was then Marlborough Street and Grandby Street, was vacant. It was purchased at public auction by a merchant named Henry Hamilton on behalf of his friend Alexander Robinson. The latter started to build on the plot of land in 1878.

The story goes that Prince Albert Victor, Duke of Clarence, and his younger brother, Prince George, who later became King George V, visited Dominica in 1879 as naval cadets on HMS Bacchante and were entertained at the Robinson house, which was afterwards named "Clarence Hall", in honour of its royal visitor. The name, however, appears to have fallen into disuse with the passage of time. Robinson probably occupied the building as a dwelling, but when the Government decided to open the Dominica Grammar School, the spacious stone building on Grandby Street was rented for that purpose and opened as a school on 16 January 1893. The property has been in the possession of the Piper family since 1924, when it was purchased by public auction by Augustus Piper. The building is said to have been extensively damaged by fire before it was acquired by Piper.

As of September 2021, the Principal of DGS is Edina Darwton, preceded by first-appointed female and longest serving principal Mrs. Alicia Jean-Jacques.

== Curriculum ==
The school offers a range of academic and technical subjects aimed at catering to the increasing demands of its in excess of 800 student population. These include but are not limited to agricultural science, auto mechanics, home economics and management in addition to its traditional natural and social science offerings.

== Houses ==
- Benedict Joseph - Red
- Dawbiney - Gold
- Dupigny - Green
- Skinner - Chocolate Brown

The two oldest Houses are Dawbiney and Skinner.

== The student council ==
The school currently has a system in which a student council, which includes prefects and form representatives, is led by the headboy and headgirl of the school.

== Notable alumni ==
- A. C. Shillingford – businessman
- Arden Shillingford – diplomat
- Alwin Bully – cultural administrator, playwright, and designer of the national flag of Dominica.
- Brian George Keith Alleyne – jurist, politician, judge
- Cecil E. A. Rawle – barrister and activist
- Clarence Seignoret - 3rd President of Dominica
- Crispin Sorhaindo - 4th President of Dominica
- Edison James - 4th Prime Minister of Dominica
- Edward Scobie - historian and journalist
- H. D. Shillingford – politician
- Irvine Shillingford – West Indies test cricketer
- Pierre Charles - 6th Prime Minister of Dominica, attended 1967–70, before transferring to Saint Mary's.
- Roosevelt Douglas - 5th Prime Minister of Dominica
- Philip Potter - leader in the Methodist Church
- Liam Sebastien - Windward Islands cricketer.
- Vernon Shaw - 5th President of Dominica
- Grayson Shillingford - West Indies test cricketer
- Roosevelt Skerrit - 7th Prime Minister of Dominica
