= Shillingford, Devon =

Village in Devon, England

Coordinates: 51.005250°N 3.454240°W

Shillingford
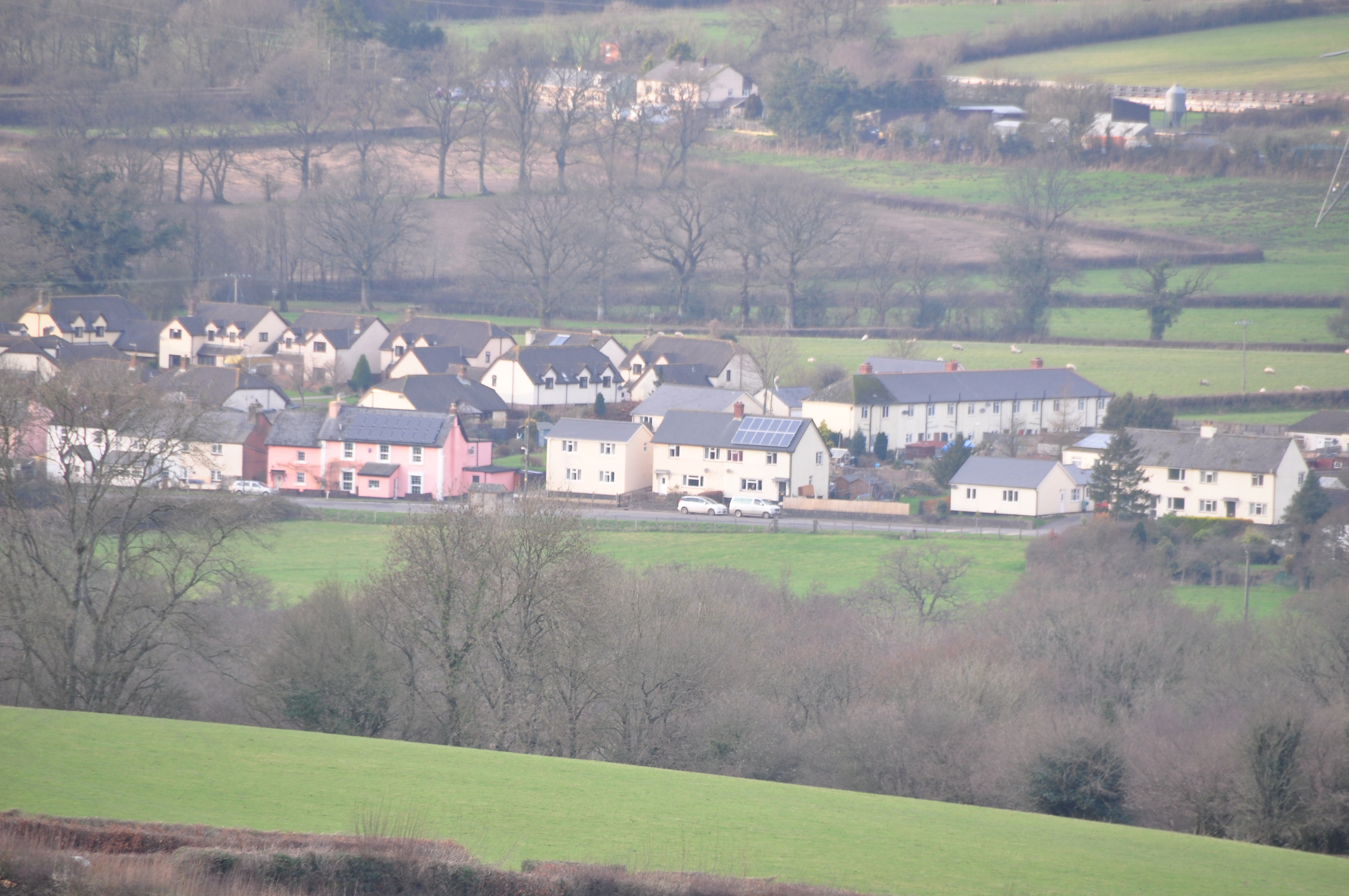
- Looking down towards the village of Shillingford from the hillside

- Location within Devon
- OS grid reference: SS9806423881
- Civil parish: Bampton
- District: Mid Devon
- Shire county: Devon
- Region: South West
- Country: England
- Sovereign state: United Kingdom
- Post town: TIVERTON
- Postcode district: EX16
- Dialling code: 01398
- Police: Devon and Cornwall
- Fire: Devon and Somerset
- Ambulance: South Western
- UK Parliament: Tiverton and Minehead

Shillingford is a village two miles (3 km) northeast of Bampton on the River Batherm in Mid Devon, England, close to the border with West Somerset. It is near the Exe Valley.

Between 1826 and 1830, a turnpike road was constructed from Taunton to Bampton. This road later became the A361 (now the B3227), and is referred to by locals as the Wiveliscombe Road. Traffic levels on this road fell when the North Devon Link Road to Tiverton, from Junction 27 of the M5, was extended to Barnstaple in 1987, and was designated as the A361, with the old A361 being reclassified as the B3227.

Historically, the village had a post office, garage, chapel, saw-mill, water-mill and pub. Today, all of these have been sold off to private owners, with the garage closing in 2011 and the site scheduled for development as four homes. The village pub, The Barleycorn, reopened under new owners as the Barleycorn House Bed and Breakfast in 2006 with five bedrooms.

The Devon & Somerset Railway ran behind the village until its closure in 1966, with a link to the Exe Valley Railway running towards Tiverton and Exeter, branching off just beyond Morebath Junction Halt. Today, much of the track bed, along with bridges and other railway infrastructure, can be seen behind the village, and along the course of these lines.

The village is sometimes confused with places of the same name, like Shillingford St George and Shillingford Abbot in South Devon and Shillingford, Oxfordshire.
