= Edward Scobie =

Dominican-born journalist and historian (1918–1996)

- Born: Vivian Edward George Dalrymple; 23 May 1918; Roseau, Dominica
- Died: 14 November 1996 (aged 78); New York City, U.S.
- Other name: Edward Vivian Scobie
- Education: Dominica Grammar School
- Occupations: Journalist, magazine publisher and historian
- Notable work: Black Britannia: A History of Blacks in Britain (1972)

Edward Vivian Scobie (23 May 1918 – 14 November 1996) was a Dominican-born Dominican-born Journalist, Magazine publisher, Politician and Historian. He is best known for his research into the history of black people in Western Europe and his 1972 seminal book Black Britannia: A History of Blacks in Britain.

== Early life and career ==
Scobie was born Vivian Edward George Dalrymple in Roseau, Dominica. He was educated at the Dominica Grammar School. At school, he displayed an aptitude for athletics, eventually representing the national teams in cricket and football. He first went to England during World War II to join the Royal Air Force (RAF), where he served as a pilot in Bomber Command, holding the rank of flight lieutenant. After the war, Scobie became a correspondent for the Chicago Defender and other Johnson Publishing Company titles with a largely African-American readership.

In 1948, Scobie published Checkers, calling itself "Britain's Premier Negro Magazine"; the magazine only lasted five issues, folding in January 1949. By 1960, Scobie joined with Charles I. Ross and Patrick Williams to produce monthly magazine Tropic. Published in London, the magazine announced that it intended to be "the voice of 250,000 coloured people in Britain", aligning itself with "coloured people everywhere in their struggle for Independence. In their fight to live with dignity and freedom". In addition to covering politics and current affairs in Britain, Africa and the Caribbean, the magazine published short stories by the likes of Samuel Selvon, Jan Carew and Winston Whyte, and included among its contributors George Lamming and Donald Hinds. Tropic ceased publication at the end of 1960.

In September 1961, Scobie launched Flamingo as editor; a monthly London-based magazine aimed at Black people in Britain and internationally, focusing on glamour, culture, sex advice and international politics, it was one of the first magazines to target Britain's African-Caribbean community. Flamingo was part-funded by the British Secret Intelligence Service (MI6), through founder Peter Hornsby and publisher Chalton Publishing, who along with the CIA wanted to support left-leaning writers and politicians who would oppose communism. It is unclear if Scobie was aware of this funding. The second issue claimed to have sold 20,000 copies in Britain and 15,000 in America. By 1964, Flamingo political articles had become more serious, and were similar to media releases from the British Foreign Office's semi-secret Information Research Department. Flamingo closed in May 1965. In 1968, he was one of the founders of Dominica Freedom Party.

Scobie's first book, Black Britannia: The History of Blacks in Britain published in 1972, brought him "international acclaim". Black Britannia is the first book-length history of African presence in Britain. He was also the author of Global African Presence (1994), and wrote many articles and essays, including for the Journal of African Civilizations. / At the time of his death in 1996, Scobie was Professor Emeritus of History in the Black Studies Department at City College of New York.

== Legacy ==
In 1998, Scobie was honoured on a commemorative postage stamp, which featured portraits of five notable Dominicans who served in the Royal Air Force (RAF) during World War II, to mark the 80th anniversary of the RAF.

== Selected bibliography ==
- Black Britannia: The History of Blacks in Britain (1972), Johnson Press, ISBN 978-0874850567.
- Global African Presence (1994), A & B Books, ISBN 9781881316725.
