= Colihaut =

Coastal village in Dominica

Coordinates: 15°29′07″N 61°27′42″W

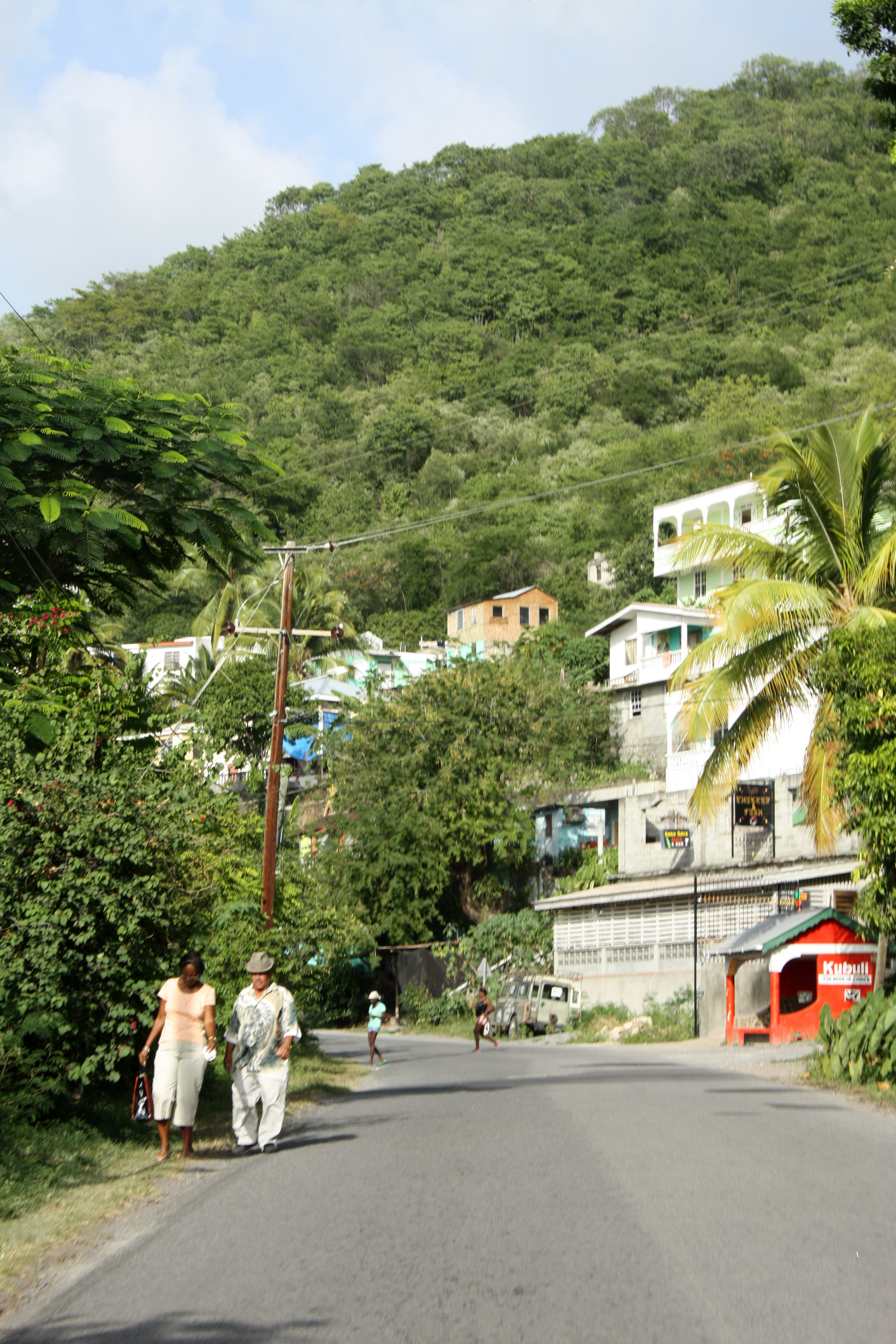
Main road through W.Colihaut, Dominica

Colihaut is a coastal village in northern Dominica within Saint Peter Parish midway between the towns of Roseau and Portsmouth. It has a population of 773 people.

Colihaut Beach is primarily gray sand with smooth waters runs along the coastal edge of the town flanked by mountain ranges.

The conservation of Colihaut natural resources is essential for ecological value and economic prosperity.

Majority of Colihaut inhabitants are earning their living in quarrying operations alongside or fishing activities. Quarries in Colihaut are managed by West Indies Aggregate Ltd (WIA), operated by Jacques Gaddarkhan.

A primary school, sports field, day nursery, post office, credit union, Village Council, health center and four Christian churches provide services to villagers. Residents earn a living mainly through agriculture and fishing. Secondary school graduates work for government and the private sector in Roseau. The young people who do not proceed to secondary school either emigrate, are unemployed or underemployed. A large percentage of the village's income however comes from remittances from family abroad.

In August 2015, Tropical Storm Erika battered Dominica. Heavy rains led to massive flooding, causing many homes on the river bank to leave their foundations. The buildings that remained in place became conduits for the river that breached its banks. Mud, silt and rubble filled the roads to a depth of many feet making travel by car or truck impossible. First responders had to use boats to assess the situation and offer aid.

Due to the storm Colihaut Primary School remained closed due to damage and lack of water well into the school year. Students were forced to commute to another school (Dublanc Primary School) and participate in a shift system where they were schooled for only a half day.

== History ==
=== The Colihaut Uprising ===
Colihaut started as a strategic French Settlement, evolved into a significant sugar-producing center, and was later a center for resistance. The area gained historical significance during the 1795 Colihaut Uprising when enslaved people and maroons, with tactical support from French republican forces, revolted against British colonial authority.

The invasion began on June 4, 1795, when Victor Hugues, who had seized Guadeloupe and declared the abolition of slavery a year earlier, sent fifty men in five boats to land at Woodford Hill. Local militiamen successfully drove them back. Four boats retreated westward, briefly touching shore at Anse de Mai before returning to Marie-Galante. Two days later, the French returned with 200 men landing at Hampstead who marched unopposed towards Pagua, where they commandeered Hatton Garden house and sugar works, establishing their primary encampment. By June 12, they had reached Entwhistle near Pagua, while a second French force of 400 men simultaneously landed at Batibou in schooners and smaller vessels, advancing toward Woodford Hill. For five days, skirmishes erupted along roadways and through forested hills. Notably absent from these encounters was the St. Peter' s Militia, a hundred men stationed at Colihaut who ignored Governor Hamilton' s call for volunteers.

For years, Colihaut had served as a conduit for French arms and ammunition to the Maroons, making it perpetually suspect in British eyes. By June 14, Republican agents had begun spreading strategic misinformation: British forces retreating at Pagua, vessels hastily departing Roseau harbor, and French residents of Couliaboun (Giraudel), Pointe Michel, and Grand Bay allegedly seizing the town in the Republic's name. This propaganda achieved its aim, galvanizing local support for the Republican cause. Several Colihaut rebels united with the brigands who had established a position at Pagua Bay on the island's opposite coast. The French strategists offered enslaved individuals a choice: freedom for allegiance, death for resistance. Though the combined rebel- French forces engaged British troops in several skirmishes, they ultimately found themselves encircled and forced to surrender on June 17. Within a week, all fugitives were either killed or captured.
