= FitzRalph =

FitzRalph is a medieval Anglo-Norman patronymic surname meaning "son of Ralph". Notable people with the surname include:

- Robert FitzRalph (died 1193), 12th-century Bishop of Worcester
- Richard FitzRalph (c.1300–1360), scholastic philosopher, theologian, and Norman Irish Archbishop of Armagh administrator
- William FitzRalph (1140–1200), High Sheriff of Nottinghamshire, Derbyshire and the Royal Forests
