= A. C. Shillingford =

West Indian businessman (1882–1938)

Albert Cavendish Shillingford
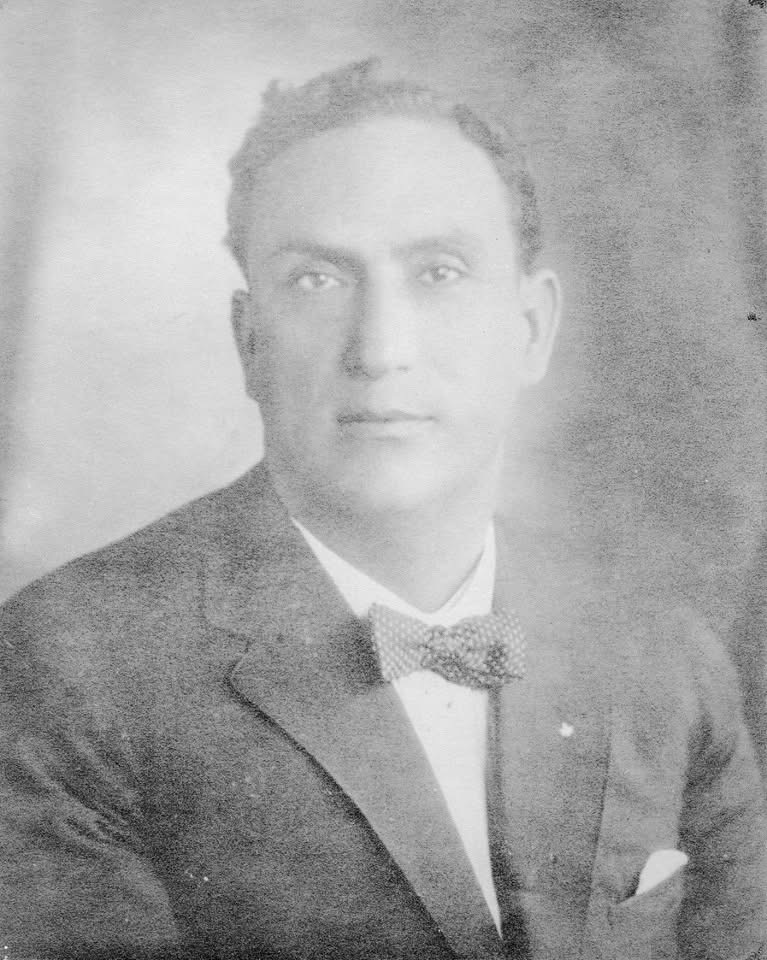
- Born: 11 May 1882; Saint Joseph, Dominica
- Died: 7 March 1938 (aged 56); Marigot, Dominica
- Occupation: Businessman
- Father: Albert Charles Shillingford
- Relatives: H. D. Shillingford (cousin); Cecil Rawle (brother-in-law)

Albert Cavendish Shillingford (11 May 1882 — 7 March 1938), also known as "ACS", was a West Indian businessman of Dominica.

== Early life ==
Albert Cavendish Shillingford was born on 11 May 1882 in Saint Joseph, Dominica, to Albert Charles Shillingford and Anne Marie Pinard. Charles, a liberal, was a respected estate owner and Justice of the peace who owned and resided at the 198 acre Snug Corner Estate in Saint George Parish. Shillingford's mother died in 1898. Charles then married Ella Serrant and had another 6 children with her. Shillingford attended the Dominica Grammar School in Roseau, which he later served as a trustee.

== Career ==
=== Early career ===
After receiving his druggist license upon completing training at the Roseau Hospital, Shillingford partnered with fellow student Sidney Green to establish Shillingford & Green, Druggists in 1905. After five years, the partnership was dissolved, leading to the creation of their respective businesses, Shillingford's being a pharmacy and grocery named The Phoenix.

=== Import and retail ===
Shillingford later expanded his business ventures, drawing inspiration from his uncle, Thomas Howard Shillingford, who had successfully opened shops in villages along the west coast. He implemented a similar strategy in Roseau, the capital, founding A. C. Shillingford & Co. Over time, the company grew into a diversified enterprise encompassing the pharmacy, a grocery store, 3 dry goods stores, an insurance company, a hardware retail and wholesale business, apparel stores, and an auto dealership.

=== Agro-industry and export ===
With the support of relatives including his cousin Howell Donald Shillingford, he expanded into agriculture, acquiring estates that produced limes, oranges, bananas, sugarcane, and other crops. In 1924, he established a lime processing factory in Newtown, followed by another in Soufrière. His operations later expanded to neighbouring islands, where he constructed additional lime processing plants in Trinidad and Grenada. This expansion broke the monopoly held by the British-owned L. Rose & Co., allowing local yellow lime growers to secure better prices for their produce. He also processed, manufactured, then exported Dominica Bay Rum. He was a board member of the Dominica Banana Association.

=== Later career ===
Lennox Honeychurch wrote that by the 1930s, the extended Shillingford family headed by A.C.S. and H. D. "had virtually controlled every aspect of Dominican society". They held significant influence as they owned many of the island's estates and controlled most of the commercial interests in Roseau; which while wandering around, Patrick Leigh Fermor noted that "every shop appeared to be called Shillingford". This combined with the family’s membership of the legislature made them both directly and indirectly politically powerful.

== Politics ==
Shillingford opposed British political dominance by supporting the Dominica Taxpayers Reform Association. He was a financial backer of the 1932 Dominica Conference, which was attended by regional political figures, including Arthur Cipriani of Trinidad and Theophilus Marryshow of Grenada. The conference advocated for a federation of the British West Indian Territories. He was an early ally of Dominican barrister and activist Cecil E. A. Rawle, who married Shillingford's sister Eva in 1919. And planter, legislator, and banker J. B. Charles (the father of Eugenia Charles). He was also allied with poet & editor J. R. Ralph Casimir, a Pan-Africanist and Marcus Garvey's UNIA organizer.

Shillingford was noted by the British colonial administration for his criticism of the treatment of West Indian soldiers who served in World War I. He protested their assignment to labour battalions under poor conditions, arguing that they had been unfairly treated despite their service to their "mother country" Britain. He was known as the best friend to the poor.

== Death & legacy ==
On Monday morning 7th March 1938, at the age of 56, Shillingford died in a drowning incident off the coast of the Hatton Garden Estate bay, in Marigot, whilst sea bathing with his cousin Howell and the estate overseer, a "Mr L. Riviere". It was reported as an accident. His funeral garnered a large number of people from all walks of life. The procession began by leaving his home at New Street, in Roseau, where all the shops closed and the banks flew their flags at half-mast.

Following Shillingford's death his cousin Newton Shillingford, another one of Dominica's wealthiest and most prominent businessmen, who had been the firm's attorney and manager for several years and owned 25% of the companies shares was made trustee of A. C. Shillingford & Co.The family's influence began to wane in the 1960s.
