= Saint Mary's Academy, Dominica =

Catholic boys' secondary school in Roseau, Dominica

Saint Mary's Academy
- Roseau; Dominica

Information
- Type: Private Catholic School
- Motto: Ora Et Labora (Pray and Work)
- Established: 1932
- Principal: Mrs.JnoBaptise
- Staff: approximately 30 (2008)
- Website: https://www.sonsofsma.org

Saint Mary's Academy - Dominica (abbreviated as SMA) is an all-boy Catholic secondary school in Roseau, Dominica. SMA offers First Form through Fifth Form, which is generally followed by two years of non-compulsory further education – often at a Sixth Form College.

== History ==
The founder of the school is Edmund Ignatius Rice.

== Mission statement ==
(For the St. Mary's Academy and all other Catholic Schools in Dominica).

1.To give priority to education in a living faith whereby students grow to appreciate the life and mission of Jesus Christ with a view to being committed to the world as he was.

2.To have special concern for the poor and the under-privileged.

3.To develop a curriculum which promotes the harmonious development of the whole person.

The Catholic School, S.M.A, works at forming a community composed of students, teachers, parents, management and other staff. This community:

- seeks to live by the Gospel values.
- recognizes the dignity of each individual.
- contributes to the building up of the local community.
- works for peace and justice in society.

== Uniform ==
The Academy's uniform consists of a white shirt jack with the school's crest pinned to the breast pocket however the student desires. Brown khaki pants are worn, except for special occasions, like church masses, where black pants are worn. The sports uniforms are based on the different houses the students belong to. They are :

Saint Francis - Blue Shirt with school crest and respective house name printed in white on the back as ST. FRANCIS

Saint Georges - Yellow Shirt with school crest and respective house name printed in white on the back as ST. GEORGES

Saint Micheals - Red Shirt with school crest and respective house name printed in white on the back as ST. MICHEALS

Saint Ignatius - Green Shirt with school crest and respective house name printed in white on the back as ST. IGNATIUS

== Student Council ==
At the beginning of every school year that commences in September, student councils are chosen by the pupils. The party normally consists of a President, a Vice-President, a public relations officer (chief communications officer), treasurer, and a secretary.

== Buildings ==
The S.M.A. compound consists of two main buildings, the Old Wing, and the New Wing (Brother Germain Wing). The Principal's office is located on the bottom floor of the Old Wing, and there are two staff rooms, one on the Old Wing, and another on the New Wing.

The Old Wing has only two floors. It is the main building of the school. On the bottom floor is the principal's office, the room's 101 to 105 and an old lab which is used for building technology. On the top floor is the staff room, then rooms 201 to 206. (All rooms respective from right to left.)

The New Wing is the latest addition to the compound. It was built in 1998, and was named after a past principal, Bro. Germain. The New Wing has three floors. The bottom floor has a library, the councilor's office, and a science lab. On the second floor is the lowest level class-room, WA5. Next, the New Staff-Room, then the computer lab. On the third floor is WA1, WA2, WA3, WA4 and WA5. (All rooms are respective from left to right.)
