= Cissie Caudeiron =

Folklorist from Roseau, Dominica (1909–1968)

- Born: 20 December 1909
- Died: 1968 (aged 58–59)
- Occupation: Folklorist

Mabel Alice "Cissie" Caudeiron (née Boyd; 20 December 1909 – 1968) was a folklorist from Roseau, Dominica. Caudeiron became famous as a Creole nationalist, and is credited with leading or inspiring a roots revival in Dominican music. She founded the Kairi Artistic Troop, and helped to organize the first National Day celebrations of 1965.

== Biography ==
Born Mabel Boyd into what was considered one of Dominica's elite families, she was known as "Cissie" from childhood. She attended the Convent High School, where she was "involved in plays and concerts and later composed many Creole songs highly influenced by the beguines of Martinique."

In 1938, she married French engineer Jean-Albert Caudeiron, and they moved to Venezuela, where she raised her family. In 1957, she returned to Dominica, "with renewed energy and determination to continue her earlier work for the greater recognition of Dominican folk heritage and traditional culture", as Lennox Honychurch notes: "She opened a small school of her own and was a teacher at the Wesley High School. Supported by the Chief Minister, Edward Le Blanc, she helped to organise the first National Day celebrations of 1965. She founded the Kairi Artistic Troupe, the first group of its kind to be formed in Dominica, which represented the island abroad at the Commonwealth Arts festival in Britain in the summer of 1965. Locally she researched and wrote articles on the heritage of music, dances and traditional dress."

She had seven children including Jeanette Lucienne Winston nee Cauderion. She was also the mother of Daniel Caudeiron, teacher, artist, writer, and broadcaster.
