= J. R. Ralph Casimir =

Dominica poet, editor, pan-Africanist (1898–1996)

- Born: Joseph Raphael Casimir; 28 September 1898; St. Joseph, Dominica
- Died: 8 March 1996 (aged 97)
- Other name: Civis Africanus
- Occupations: Poet, editor, journalist and bookseller
- Known for: Founding member of Marcus Garvey's Universal Negro Improvement Association

J. R. Ralph Casimir (28 September 1898 – 8 March 1996) was a Dominican poet, editor, journalist and bookseller. A pioneering Caribbean pan-Africanist, he was a founding member of Marcus Garvey's Universal Negro Improvement Association (UNIA), organising its Dominica branch. Casimir also compiled Dominica's first poetry anthologies.

== Biography ==
Born into a lower-middle-class black family in St. Joseph, Dominica, in 1898, Joseph Raphael (Ralph) Casimir was educated at the St. Joseph Government School, serving as a pupil teacher in 1915–1916, before he and his family moved to Roseau, where he became a solicitor's clerk to Cecil Rawle.

Keenly interested in politics and the historic and contemporary experiences of African people, Casimir contacted Marcus Garvey after reading an article in the Negro World, and became a founding member as well as the organiser and General Secretary (from 1919 to 1922) of the Dominica branch of Garvey's Universal Negro Improvement Association (UNIA). Casimir's essay "What Ails Dominica", published in the Negro World in 1920, resonated with readers in dealing with dissatisfaction to colonial rule in the Caribbean. He acted as the Dominican agent for Negro World and for other black periodicals such as The Crisis (edited by W. E. B. Du Bois). Under the pseudonym "Civis Africanus", he contributed "dozens of Pan-Africanist-oriented poems" to the Negro World, and after the publication was officially banned in West Africa, sent copies to the editor of the Gold Coast Leader, J. E. Casely Hayford. Casimir was also an agent for Garvey's Black Star Line.

Casimir was the secretary to the 1932 Dominica Conference – a forerunner of the West Indies Federation in advocating for democratization of the English-speaking colonies as a first step towards self-government – which was attended by representatives from Trinidad, Barbados, Dominica, Montserrat, St. Lucia, St. Vincent, Antigua, St. Kitts and Grenada, including such key figures as Captain Arthur Cipriani of Trinidad and T. Albert Marryshow of Grenada.

Alongside being the leading figure in the Dominica UNIA, Casimir was active at a local community level, elected to serve as a Roseau town councillor, and his working life additionally encompassed being a bookseller and bookbinder. In his literary career he contributed militant poetry to The Dominica Star, the newspaper edited by Phyllis Shand Allfrey, as well as writing articles for local, regional and US publications, including the Pittsburgh Courier, for which he was a correspondent from 1950 to 1952.

He published six collections of poetry: Pater Noster and Other Poems (1967), Africa Arise and Other Poems (1967), A Little Kiss and Other Poems (1968), Farewell and Other Poems (1971), Dominica and Other Poems (1968), and The Negro Speaks (1969), featuring in his last book a series of poems about African civilization and the historical contributions of black pioneers.

Casimir was also an editor and anthologist, notably compiling four volumes of Dominican verse: Poesy, Book I (1943), Poesy, Book II (1944), Poesy, Book III (1946), and Poesy Book IV (1947).

Casimir died aged 97 in 1996.

== Legacy ==
Casimir is the subject of a biography, Black Man Listen, by his granddaughter Kathy Casimir MacLean, published by Papillote Press in 2022. According to Lennox Honychurch, "In Black Man Listen, Kathy MacLean has not only done her grandfather proud, but she has provided Caribbean people with a new window onto Marcus Garvey's work in the region and among the African diaspora around the world." In another review of the book, Gabriel Christian wrote: "MacLean masterfully juxtaposes historical accounts with present-day reflections, reinforcing the timelessness of Casimir's mission for dignity and unity. ... Overall, 'Listen Black Man' is a powerful tribute and an essential read for anyone interested in Caribbean history, Pan-Africanism, and the relentless pursuit of cultural and political identity. It's a compelling reminder of the remarkable impact one individual can have in shaping the course of history."
