= Shillingford St George =

Village in Devon, England

Coordinates: 50°41′N 3°33′W

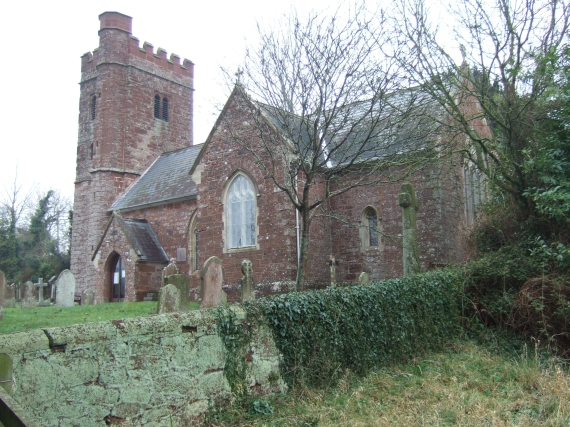
Shillingford St George church

Shillingford St. George is a village on the outskirts of Exeter, Teignbridge, England. It is about 3 miles south of the City of Exeter. At the 2021 census, the village had a population of 395.

== The church ==
The church is thought to have originated as the domestic chapel of the Shillingford family, one of whose members served as Rector of the parish and is recorded in the vestry list. The family retained ownership of the surrounding lands until they were sold by William Shillingford to Sir William Huddesfield, a prominent lawyer and Recorder of the City of Exeter. Huddesfield served as Attorney General to Edward IV of England and was later a member of the council of Henry VII of England.

During his tenure, Sir William significantly enlarged the church and was responsible for the construction of its tower. Architecturally, the building is cruciform in plan, comprising a nave, chancel, and transepts. Notably, when viewed from the east end, the tower is offset slightly to the left. This asymmetry has been interpreted symbolically, representing the inclination of Christ’s head to the left at the Crucifixion—a feature more commonly associated with the alignment of the chancel in medieval church design.
