= Arden Shillingford =

Dominican diplomat

Romeo Arden Coleridge Shillingford MBE (11 February 1936 – 4 January 2019), was a Dominican diplomat. He was appointed as Dominica's first High Commissioner to the Court of St James's post-independence in 1978, serving until 1985. He was accredited Ambassador to France, Spain, Belgium, European Economic Community and UNESCO.

== Early life ==
Arden Shillingford was born in Roseau, Dominica, on 11 February 1936. He was educated at the Dominica Grammar School, where he studied alongside his friend, future politician Charles Maynard.

== Career ==
Shillingford began his career in the Dominican Civil Service in 1957 as a Junior Clerk. He later served as Clerk of the Court and became Chief Clerk in the Magistrates’ Office by 1961. He was a founding member and Vice Chairman of the Dominica Jaycees.

In the early 1960s, Shillingford moved to the United Kingdom, where he studied law at the School of Law, London.

In 1965, Shillingford joined the Eastern Caribbean Commission in London on secondment from the Dominican Civil Service. He held several posts there, including: Migrants Welfare Officer, Students’ Officer, Assistant Trade Secretary, Personal Assistant to the Commissioner (1968–1971) and Administrative Assistant, Consular and Protocol Affairs (1973–1978). He also acted as Commissioner on multiple occasions.

Shillingford served on the Board of Governors of the West Indian Students' Centre, becoming Deputy Chairman (1970–1975), Chairman (1976–1979), and later President.

In 1977, he was appointed a Member of the Order of the British Empire (MBE) for his service to the West Indian community in the United Kingdom.

Following Dominica's independence in 1978, Shillingford was appointed the country's first High Commissioner to the Court of St James's in the United Kingdom. He held the position from 1978 to 1985. He was also accredited as Ambassador to: France, Spain, Belgium, European Economic Community (EEC), and UNESCO.

Shillingford was one of the three final surviving members of the Dominica Constitutional Conference (1977–1978), which laid the foundation for the country's independence.

In the aftermath of Hurricane David in 1979, Shillingford coordinated major relief and fundraising efforts in the UK. He worked with Dominican community organizations to launch the Dominica National Appeal, which raised thousands of pounds and procured emergency supplies for Dominica. These efforts were conducted under the patronage of Princess Margaret.

In 1985, Shillingford was recalled to Dominica and appointed Permanent Secretary in the Ministry of Community Development and Social Affairs. He remained active in public service and community affairs until his retirement.
