= John Parsons Shillingford =

British cardiologist

John Parsons Shillingford CBE FRCP
- Born: John Parsons Shillingford; 15 April 1914; London, England
- Died: 16 September 1999 (aged 85); Richmond, London, England
- Other name: Jack Parsons Shillingford
- Education: Bishop's Stortford College; London Hospital Medical School; Harvard Medical School
- Occupation: Cardiologist
- Known for: Lumleian Lectures (1972)
- Spouse: Doris Margaret Franklin (m. 1947)
- Children: 3

John "Jack" Parsons Shillingford CBE FRCP (April 15, 1914 – September 16, 1999), was a British physician and cardiologist, known as a pioneer of the introduction of coronary care units in the United Kingdom in the 1960s.

== Early life ==
Shillingford was born in London, England on April 15, 1914. He attended Bishop's Stortford College. He then studied at the London Hospital Medical School.

At the beginning of World War II, he won a Rockefeller Foundation scholarship to Harvard Medical School and graduated with an MD in 1943. He held medical residency appointments at Baltimore's Johns Hopkins Hospital in Baltimore, Maryland and at Presbyterian Hospital in Manhattan, New York.

Shillingford qualified for Membership of the Royal Colleges of Surgeons and the Royal College of Physicians in 1945. He graduated with a MB BS from the London Hospital Medical School.in 1945 and an MD in 1948.

== Career ==
After the war, Shillingford worked at the London Hospital until 1950. In 1950, John McMichael recruited Shillingford to the Royal Postgraduate Medical School in Hammersmith. Shillingford's research team studied the narrowing of the arteries that occurs with aging. He promoted engineering and biophysics in cardiovascular research.

He headed the Medical Research Council's cardiovascular unit, and his engineering interests and skills led to several diagnostic innovations. His major contributions were in the study and care of patients in the acute stages of heart attack, at a time when little was offered beyond pain relief. In the 1960s, he realized that research into heart disease was underfunded and, together with McMichael, supported the recently formed British Heart Foundation. He became the chair of angiocardiography at the University of London in 1969.

He published over 400 articles that form the basis of much of the current understanding of heart disease.

== Personal life ==
He married Doris Margaret "Jill" Franklin in 1947 in Brentford, Middlesex. They had two sons and a daughter. He died in 1999.

== Awards and honours ==
- 1960 – Fellow of the Royal College of Physicians
- 1966 – Fellow of the American College of Cardiology
- 1968 – President of the Section of Experimental Medicine, Annual Meeting of the Royal Society of Medicine
- 1972 – Lumleian Lecturer on Management of Acute Myocardial Infarction over the Last Ten Years
- 1974 – Honorary Fellow of the American College of Physicians
- 1988 – Commander of the Order of the British Empire

== Selected publications ==
- Shillingford, J. P. (1950). "The Red Bone Marrow in Heart Failure". Journal of Clinical Pathology. 3 (1): 24–39. doi:10.1136/jcp.3.1.24. PMC 1023339. PMID 15404597.
- McMichael, J.; Shillingford, J. P. (1957). "The Role of Valvular Incompetence in Heart Failure". British Medical Journal. 1 (5018): 537–541. doi:10.1136/bmj.1.5018.537. PMC 1974699. PMID 13404228.
- Cobbs, B. W.; Shillingford, J. P.; Steiner, R. E. (1957). "The Size of the Left Atrium, in Conditions Other Than Mitral Valve Disease". British Heart Journal. 19 (4): 495–502. doi:10.1136/hrt.19.4.495. PMC 503959. PMID 13471815.
- Murray, J. F.; Shillingford, J. P. (1958). "A Comparison of Direct and Extraction Methods for the Determination of T-1824 (Evans Blue) in Plasma and Serum". Journal of Clinical Pathology. 11 (2): 170–172. doi:10.1136/jcp.11.2.170. PMC 1024164. PMID 13513794.
- Taylor, S. H.; Shillingford, J. P. (1959). "Clinical Applications of Coomassie Blue". British Heart Journal. 21 (4): 497–504. doi:10.1136/hrt.21.4.497. PMC 1017608. PMID 18610134.
- Harrison, R. J.; Shillingford, J. P.; Allen, G. T.; Teare, D. (1961). "Perforation of Interventricular Septum After Myocardial Infarction". British Medical Journal. 1 (5232): 1066–1071. doi:10.1136/bmj.1.5232.1066. PMC 1953688. PMID 13711842.
- Shillingford, J. P.; Somers, K. (1961). "Clinical and Hæmodynamic Patterns in Endomyocardial Fibrosis". British Heart Journal. 23 (4): 433–446. doi:10.1136/hrt.23.4.433. PMC 1017789. PMID 18610159.
- Bruce, T. A.; Shillingford, J. P. (1962). "The Normal Resting Cardiac Output: Serial Determinations by a Dye Dilution Method". British Heart Journal. 24 (1): 69–75. doi:10.1136/hrt.24.1.69. PMC 1017845. PMID 13873822.
- Calnan, J. S.; Kountz, S.; Pentecost, B. L.; Shillingford, J. P.; Steiner, R. E. (1964). "Venous Obstruction in the Aetiology of Lymphoedema Praecox". British Medical Journal. 2 (5403): 214.2–226. doi:10.1136/bmj.2.5403.214-b. PMC 1817897. PMID 14150911.
- Shillingford, J. P. (1965). "The place of measurement in the management of acutely ill patients. Measurement in the intensive care of heart disease". Proceedings of the Royal Society of Medicine. 58 (10): 773–775. doi:10.1177/003591576505801006. PMC 1898962. PMID 5836729.
- Shillingford, J. P. (1965). "The Intensive Care of the Coronary Crisis". Proceedings of the Royal Society of Medicine. 58 (2): 101–103. doi:10.1177/003591576505800208. PMC 1898347. PMID 14262009.
- Shillingford, J. P. (1967). "Significance of the systolic murmur". British Medical Journal. 4 (5578): 539. doi:10.1136/bmj.4.5578.539. PMC 1749144.
- Thomas, M.; Jewitt, D. E.; Shillingford, J. P. (1968). "Analysis of 150 patients with acute myocardial infarction admitted to an intensive care and study unit". British Medical Journal. 1 (5595): 787–790. doi:10.1136/bmj.1.5595.787. PMC 1985716. PMID 5641483.
- Shillingford, J. P. (1968). "Considerations of Chest Disease". British Medical Journal. 1 (5583): 42–43. doi:10.1136/bmj.1.5583.42-b. PMC 1984930.
- Gabe, I. T.; Mason, D. T.; Gault, J. H.; Ross Jr, J.; Zelis, R.; Mills, C. J.; Braunwald, E.; Shillingford, J. P. (1970). "Effect of respiration on venous return and stroke volume in cardiac tamponade". British Heart Journal. 32 (5): 592–596. doi:10.1136/hrt.32.5.592. PMC 487377. PMID 5470038.
- Reid, D. S.; Pelides, L. J.; Shillingford, J. P. (1971). "Surface mapping of RS-T segment in acute myocardial infarction". British Heart Journal. 33 (3): 370–374. doi:10.1136/hrt.33.3.370. PMC 458420. PMID 5579153.
- Shillingford, J. P. (1971). "Panel discussion". Postgraduate Medical Journal. 47 (543): 27–29. doi:10.1136/pgmj.47.543.27. PMC 2467139.
- Millar, R. N.; Maurer, B. J.; Reid, D. S.; Wray, R.; Birkhead, J. S.; Shillingford, J. P. (1973). "Studies of intra-atrial conduction with bipolar atrial and His electrograms". British Heart Journal. 35 (6): 604–609. doi:10.1136/hrt.35.6.604. PMC 458665. PMID 4712464.
- Zacharoulis, A. A.; Evans, T. R.; Ziady, G. M.; Coltart, D. J.; Shillingford, J. P. (1975). "Measurement of stroke volume from pulmonary artery pressure record in man". British Heart Journal. 37 (1): 20–25. doi:10.1136/hrt.37.1.20. PMC 484150. PMID 803378.
- Selwyn, A. P.; Ogunro, E.; Shillingford, J. P. (1977). "Loss of electrically active myocardium during anterior infarction in man". British Heart Journal. 39 (11): 1186–1191. doi:10.1136/hrt.39.11.1186. PMC 483394. PMID 588374.
- Selwyn, A. P.; Ogunro, E. A.; Shillingford, J. P. (1977). "Natural history and evaluation of ST segment changes and MB CK release in acute myocardial infarction". British Heart Journal. 39 (9): 988–994. doi:10.1136/hrt.39.9.988. PMC 483358. PMID 907778.
- Selwyn, A. P.; Fox, K.; Welman, E.; Shillingford, J. P. (1978). "Natural history and evaluation of Q waves during acute myocardial infarction". British Heart Journal. 40 (4): 383–387. doi:10.1136/hrt.40.4.383. PMC 482808. PMID 646905.
- Selwyn, A. P.; Fox, K.; Welman, E.; Jonathan, A.; Shillingford, J. P. (1978). "Loss of electrically active myocardium during inferior infarction in man". British Heart Journal. 40 (9): 1019–1024. doi:10.1136/hrt.40.9.1019. PMC 483527. PMID 708527.
- Fox, K. M.; Selwyn, A. P.; Shillingford, J. P. (1978). "A method for precordial surface mapping of the exercise electrocardiogram". British Heart Journal. 40 (12): 1339–1343. doi:10.1136/hrt.40.12.1339. PMC 483576. PMID 737091.
- Fox, K. M.; Selwyn, A. P.; Shillingford, J. P. (1979). "Projection of electrocardiographic signs in precordial maps after exercise in patients with ischaemic heart disease". British Heart Journal. 42 (4): 416–421. doi:10.1136/hrt.42.4.416. PMC 482176. PMID 508472.
