= Cara Shillingford =

Dominican lawyer

- Education: University of the West Indies
- Occupation: Lawyer
- Known for: Human Rights Activism

Cara Shillingford is a Dominican lawyer. She has brought several civil cases against the governments of various Caribbean countries, including the government of the Commonwealth of Dominica. In April 2024, she represented the Claimant in a High Court civil case contesting laws criminalizing "buggery" in Dominica and was successful.

== Life ==
Shillingford was raised in Salisbury, Dominica. She is the daughter of Hillary Shillingford a farmer and Electoral Commissioner, and Sylvia Vidal, who live in Salisbury. She attended the University of the West Indies where she graduated with a First Class Honours Degree in law and she was accepted to the Bar in Dominica in October 2013. She operates her own chambers in Dominica, employing other lawyers.

In 2014, she represented the Claimants in a civil case brought against fifteen politicians of the Dominica Labour Party who were elected that year. The Claimants alleged that the politicians were involved in treating prior to the election.

In 2018, she went to court to challenge the use of the Riot Act against over 50 citizens.

In 2020, she was a founding member of the Committee of Concerned Lawyers (CCL), which is a group established by Dominican lawyers to "educate its members, to encourage collegiality and to maintain cooperation between its members and the judiciary, to promote the honour and dignity of the legal profession, to foster the highest professional standards of integrity, honour and courtesy in the legal profession, to assist the public in accessing legal services..." among other objectives. The CCL has stated that they have no common political or religious loyalties. They also stated that they intend to improve education in legal matters so that members of the public were aware of their rights.

In 2023, she represented the Claimants in a High Court civil case brought against the government of St. Vincent and the Grenadines for wrongful termination of nine employees whose employment was terminated due to their refusal to take the COVID-19 vaccine. Anthony Astaphan represented the government of St. Vincent and the Grenadines. Shillingford argued that the termination of the Claimants' employment was unconstitutional and the Court ruled in her favour.

Also in 2023, Shillingford advocated for the creation of a constituency solely for the Dominican diaspora.

In April 2024, Shillingford persuaded the High Court of Justice to overturn laws banning same-sex activity because they violated the constitutional rights of LGBT individuals.
