= Roger Shillingford =

English politician

Roger Shillingford (fl. 1421) of Exeter, Devon, was an English politician.

He was a member (MP) of the parliament of England for Exeter in May 1421.
