= Cecil E. A. Rawle =

Dominican barrister and activist

The Honourable Cecil E. A. Rawle
- Born: Cecil Edgar Alan Rawle; 27 March 1891; Roseau, Dominica
- Died: 9 June 1938 (aged 47); Antigua and Barbuda
- Education: Dominica Grammar School; Codrington College
- Occupation: Barrister
- Spouse: Eva Shillingford (m. 1919)
- Relatives: A. C. Shillingford (brother-in-law)

Cecil E. A. Rawle (27 March 1891 – 9 June 1938), was a Dominican barrister and activist.

== Early life and education ==
Cecil Edgar Alan Rawle was born in Roseau, Dominica, where his Trinidadian parents, William Alexander Romilly Rawle and Elizabeth Sophia Garrett, had moved. His father was head of the local branch of the West India and Panama Telegraph Company, the precursor of Cable and Wireless. Rawle attended Dominica Grammar School and Codrington College in Barbados. He subsequently moved to London, where he went on to graduate as a barrister at the Inner Temple in 1913.

== Career ==
He practised law in Grenada and Trinidad, before he returned to Dominica and went on to found the Dominica Representative Government Association. In 1924 a new constitution was granted and Rawle was elected to represent Roseau in the elections the following year. He was an avid campaigner and activist in the political arena in Dominica. In addition to practising law, Rawle owned the Dominica Tribune Newspaper, which in 1924 he incorporated with the Dominica Guardian.

In 1932 he chaired the Dominica Conference, which became known as The West Indies Conference, at which there were representatives from Trinidad, Barbados, Dominica, Montserrat, St. Lucia, St. Vincent, Antigua, St. Kitts and Grenada. The first regional meeting to be initiated by Caribbean leaders to discuss the future of the region, it led the way for the West Indies Federation. In his final address, Rawle stated:

"We suggest that there should be a Governor General of the whole of the West Indies who in the exercise of the powers and authorities entrusted to him must act upon the advice of the Federal Executive Council....the Federal Assembly will from its own membership select for the Governor his advisers. The most radical change of all perhaps, is the proposal that the Governor General and in similar manner the Officers administering the Island Governments shall not have the power to disregard the advice of their Executive Councils. In Canada, Newfoundland, New Zealand, and even little Malta, the officers administering the Government act upon the advice of their Executive Councils. Why should the peoples of the West Indies continue to be burdened with executives irresponsible to the Legislature?"

In 1937, Rawle was appointed Attorney General of the Leeward Islands and moved to Antigua.

== Personal life ==
Rawle married Eva Shillingford in 1919 at her family estate, Snug Corner. Eva was the sister of A. C. Shillingford.

== Death & legacy ==
After moving to Antigua, Rawle died suddenly the following year, on 9 June 1938, at the age of 47.

In the early 1950s, his daughter Sonia married Cecil Kelsick, with whom she had 5 children.

In 2007, a bust monument was erected of Rawle in Roseau.
