= H. D. Shillingford =

Dominican politician, planter & businessman

The Honourable Howell Donald Shillingford CBE

Personal details
- Born: 10 July 1888 Colihaut, Dominica
- Died: 11 October 1975 (aged 87) Roseau, Dominica
- Relations: A. C. Shillingford (cousin)
- Parent: Howard Shillingford
- Occupation: politician

Howell Donald Shillingford CBE (10 July 1888 – 11 October 1975) was a West Indian politician and agriculturist of Dominica.

Shillingford played a significant role in Dominica’s political devolution from British colonial rule to a representative government. He was a key advocate for devolution and participated actively in the early political development of the island.

== Early life ==
Howell Donald Shillingford was born on 10 July 1888 in Colihaut, Dominica. His father Thomas Howard Shillingford of Colihaut was a merchant and a member of the Legislative Council of Dominica, who owned a wide swath of land from St. Joseph to Portsmouth and had invested in shops in each village along the west coast from Layou to Dublanc, being the first to establish stores in the isolated west coast communities. In 1907 Howard had a “pretty large house” built in Colihaut. Shillingford’s first cousin was businessman A. C. Shillingford. He attended Dominica Grammar School and Morne Bruce Agricultural School, both located in Roseau.

== Career ==
Political career
Date(s)	Role(s)
1925–1928:	Elected member for the electoral district of Saint Joseph, Saint Peter, Saint John, and Saint Andrew, Legislative Council
1928–1931:	Elected member, Legislative Council
1931–1934	Elected member, Legislative Council
1932:	Delegate and co-organizer of the Dominica Conference
1934–1937:	Elected member, Legislative Council
c. 1944–1947:	Elected member for the northern electoral district, Legislative Council
1947–1951:	Nominated member, Legislative Council
1951–1954:	Elected member for the north-western district, Legislative Council 1953: Re-elected deputy president of the legislative council for the duration of its second session.
1954–1957:	Elected member, Legislative Council
1957–1961:	Elected member, Legislative Council
1960:	Appointed Minister of Trade and Production, Legislative Council
1961–1965:	Elected member, Legislative Council; served as a member of the Opposition
1966:	Retired from politics

In 1927, he co-founded the Dominica Taxpayers Reform Association to advocate for greater economic equity and political accountability. In 1932, he helped organise the West Indies Conference in Dominica; Together with J. B. Charles, G. F. Ashpitel, R. H. Lockhart and Chairman Cecil E. A. Rawle, he was one of Dominica's delegated to the conference. The conference concluded that internal self governance must be the main priority. He was a founding member of the Union Club and one of the signatories of Dominica’s first political manifesto with Ralph Nichols, Lennox Napier, and Phillip Rolle in 1936.

In addition to his political contributions, he helped spearhead the development of Dominica’s lime juice and banana industries, which became important sectors of the island’s economy. Eugenia Charles wrote he helped "build the Industry to a stage where assets had accumulated to benefit of the grower".

== Philanthropy ==
His philanthropic work included donating land for the construction of the Colihaut Primary School and its playground, and funding annual scholarships for underprivileged children to attend secondary school. He was recognised for his public service and contributions to Dominica with the award of Commander of the British Empire (CBE) by the British Government in 1949.
